= Hanna's town resolves =

Hanna's Town Resolves
- Part of Events leading up to the American Revolutionary War
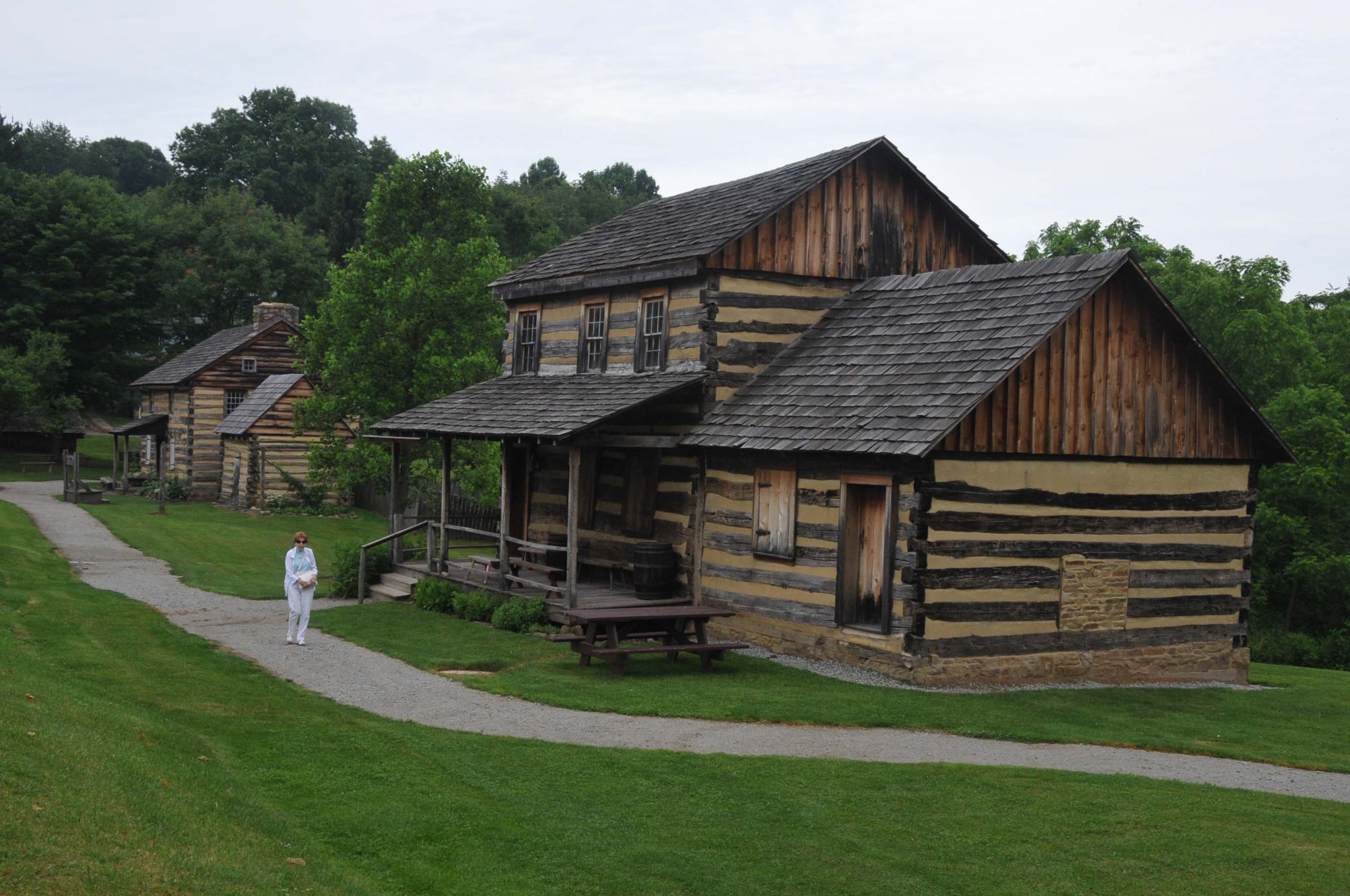
- Reconstruction of Hanna's Town
- Date: 16 May 1775
- Location: Hanna's Town, Westmoreland County, Pennsylvania, British America; 40.3445°N 79.5072°W
- Cause: Battles of Lexington and Concord, Grievances with Parliament, Loyalism to King George III
- Organized by: Local leaders including Arthur St. Clair
- Outcome: Raising of local militia, declaration of independence from British Parliament

The Hanna's Town Resolves were a list of statements adopted at Hanna's Town, the contemporary seat of Westmoreland County, Pennsylvania, on May 16, 1775, at the onset of the American Revolutionary War. Written in response to the Battles of Lexington and Concord, the Hanna's Town Resolves were one of the most direct challenges to British authority in the Thirteen Colonies preceding the Declaration of Independence.

== History ==
Hanna's Town, named for its founder Robert Hanna, acted as the first seat of Westmoreland County, Pennsylvania, from 1773 to 1786, and was the first English court west of the Allegheny Mountains.

In early May 1775, word of the Battles of Lexington and Concord reached western Pennsylvania, sparking concern that similar violence would spread throughout the colonies. In response, citizens of Westmoreland County gathered at Hanna's Town and drafted the Hanna's Town Resolves on May 16, 1775. Among those in attendance was Arthur St. Clair. Robert Hanna was absent, having been jailed for refusing to support a rival Virginia-backed court. The exact author or signers of the Hanna's Town Resolves are unknown. A copy of the text was published in The Pennsylvania Gazette in August 1775.

In the Hanna's Town Resolves, the citizens of Westmoreland County proclaimed a willingness to take unprecedented measures to maintain and defend their rights from the British Crown. Notably, the resolves pledged to use military action to resist further "tyrannical" acts from Parliament. This seemingly drastic action was due largely to the composition of the local population of the Pennsylvania frontier. Some sources describe the Hanna's Town Resolves as a "little Declaration of Independence," while others note how the text expresses loyalty to King George III and interest in restoring relations with Britain.

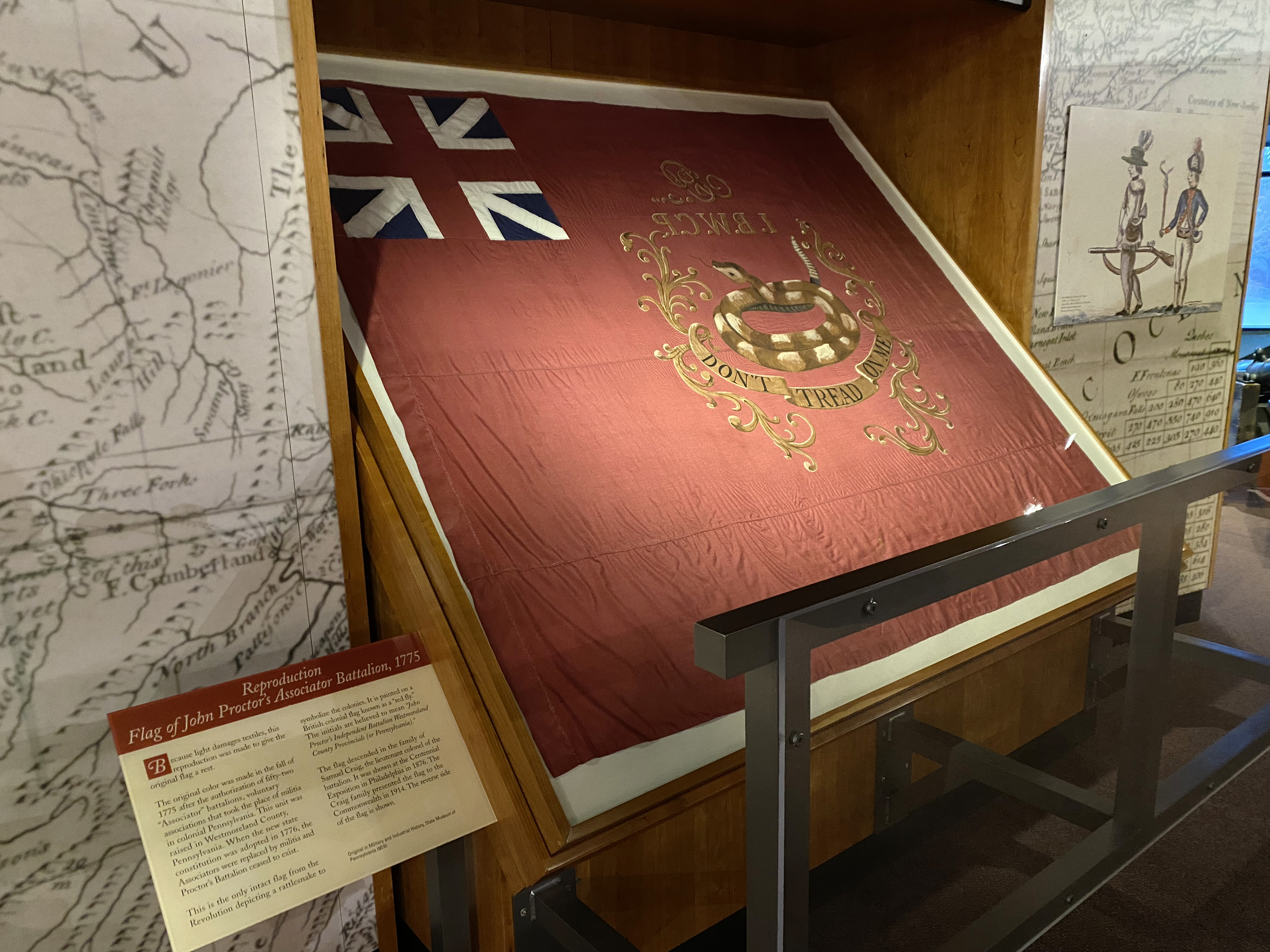
Reproduction flag of the Westmoreland County militia on display at the Fort Pitt Museum

As a direct result of the Hanna's Town Resolves, a county militia was formed at Hanna's Town to defend the region. The flag of the Westmoreland County militia's first battalion survives and is in the collections of the Fort Pitt Museum. The original flag is displayed in the Fort Pitt Museum on a limited basis and replaced by a reproduction for most of the year. The flag was made using a Red Ensign with imagery and text painted on the field. The flag shows a coiled rattlesnake, a symbol of the American colonies, poised to strike at the British Union, along with the warning "Don't Tread On Me."

The Hanna's Town Resolves occurred a few weeks before the Mecklenburg Resolves in North Carolina. More than a year later, the Declaration of Independence was signed in Philadelphia, Pennsylvania.

In 1782, seven years after the signing of the Resolves, British troops and their Native American allies burned Hanna's Town to the ground in one of the last actions of the American Revolutionary War. The town was never to recover. Its site was listed on the National Register of Historic Places as the Site of Old Hannastown in 1972.

== Text ==
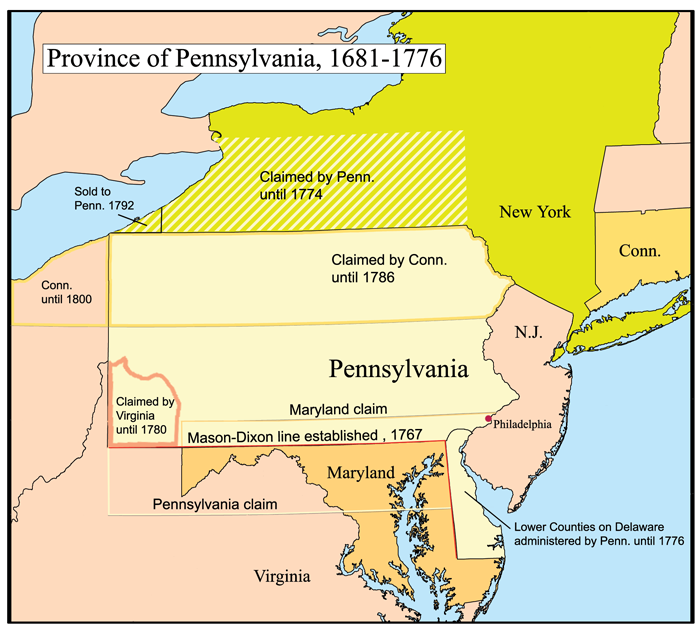
Map of Provincial Pennsylvania

Resolved unanimously, That the Parliament of Great Britain, by several late acts, have declared the inhabitants of Massachusetts Bay to be in Rebellion, and the ministry, by endeavoring to enforce those acts, have attempted to reduce the said inhabitants to a more wretched state of slavery than ever before existed in any state or country. Not content with violating their constitutional and chartered privileges, they would strip them of the rights of humanity, exposing lives to the wanton and unpunishable sport of licentious soldiery, and depriving them of the very means of subsistence."

"Resolved unanimously, That there is no reason to doubt that the same system of tyranny and oppression will (should it meet with success in Massachusetts Bay) be extended to every other part of America: It is therefore become the indispensable duty of every American, of every man who has any public virtue or love for his country, or any bowels for posterity, by every means which God has put in his power, to resist and oppose the execution of it; that for us we will be ready to oppose it with our lives and fortunes. And the better to enable us to accomplish it, we will immediately form ourselves into a military body, to consist of companies to be made up out of the several townships under the following association, which is declared to be the Association of Westmoreland County." "Possessed with the most unshaken loyalty and fidelity to His Majesty, King George the Third, whom we acknowledge to be our lawful and rightful King, and who we wish may long be the beloved sovereign of a free and happy people throughout the whole British Empire; we declare to the world, that we do not mean by this Association to deviate from that loyalty which we hold in our bounded duty to observe, but, animated with the love of liberty, it is no less our duty to maintain and defend our just rights (which, with sorrow, we have seen of late wantonly violated in many instances by a wicked Ministry and a corrupted Parliament) and transmit them to our posterity, for purpose which we do agree and associate together:"

"1st. To arm and form ourselves into a regiment or regiments, and choose officers to command us in such proportions as shall be thought necessary."

"2nd. We will, with alacrity, endeavor to make ourselves masters of the manual exercise, and such evolutions as may be necessary to enable us to act in a body with concert; and to that end we will meet at such times and places as shall be appointed either for the companies or the regiment, by the officers commanding each when chosen."

"3rd. That should our country be invaded by a foreign enemy, or should troops be sent from Great Britain to enforce the late arbitrary acts of its Parliament, we will cheerfully submit to military discipline, and to the utmost of our power resist and oppose them, or either of them, and will coincide with any plan that may be formed for the defense of America in general, or Pennsylvania in particular."

"4th. That we do not wish or desire any innovations, but only that things may be restored to, and go on in the same way as before the era of the Stamp Act, when Boston grew great, and America was happy. As a proof of this disposition, we will quietly submit to the laws by which we have been accustomed to be governed before that period, and will, in our general or associate capacities, be ready when called on to assist the civil magistrate in carrying the same in execution."

"5th. That when the British Parliament shall have repealed their late obnoxious statutes, and shall recede from their claim to tax us, and make laws for us in every instance; or when some general plan of union and reconciliation has been formed and accepted by America, this our Association shall be dissolved; but till then it shall remain in full force; and to the observation of it, we bind ourselves by everything dear and sacred amongst men." "No licensed murder: no famine introduced by law"

"Resolved that on Wednesday, the twenty-fourth instant, the township meets to accede to the said Association and choose their officer."

Adopted at a general meeting of the inhabitants of the County of Westmoreland, held at Hanna's Town the 16th day of May, 1775 for taking into consideration the very alarming situation of the country, occasioned by the dispute with Great Britain.

== See also ==
- Site of Old Hannastown
