= IBM Building =

IBM Building can refer to:

- 590 Madison Avenue, also known as the IBM Building, New York City (former worldwide headquarters)
- 1200 Fifth, also known as the IBM Building, Seattle
- IBM Building, Honolulu
- IBM Building (Pittsburgh)
- United Steelworkers Building in Pittsburgh, originally known as the IBM Building
- 330 North Wabash in Chicago, formerly known as IBM Plaza
- IBM branch office in Cranford, New Jersey, by architect Victor Lundy

== See also ==
- 1250 René-Lévesque, formerly IBM-Marathon Tower, a skyscraper in Montreal
- IBM Tower, now One Atlantic Center, a skyscraper in Atlanta
- IBM Towers, now Fuji Xerox Towers, a skyscraper in Singapore
