= Gateway Center (Pittsburgh) =

Redevelopment site in Pittsburgh, Pennsylvania

- Neighborhood of Pittsburgh
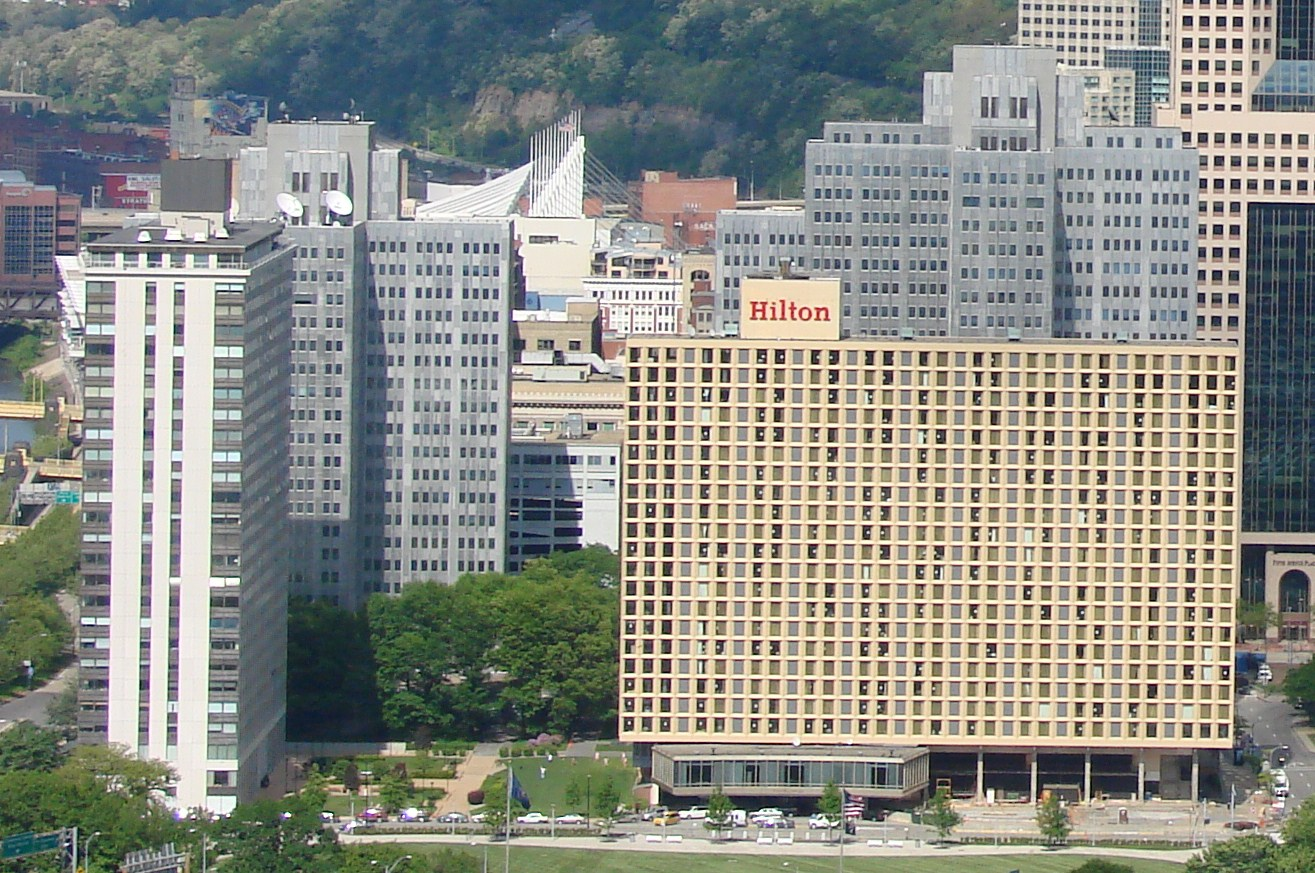
- Gateway Towers, 1–3 Gateway Center, and Pittsburgh Hilton

- Country: United States
- State: Pennsylvania
- County: Allegheny County
- City: Pittsburgh

Gateway Center is a complex of office, residential, and hotel buildings covering 25 acres (10 ha) in Downtown Pittsburgh, Pennsylvania. It lies between Commonwealth Place and Stanwix Street at the western edge of the central business district, immediately to the east of Point State Park. Construction of the Gateway Center was one of the earliest urban renewal projects in the United States and part of Pittsburgh's Renaissance I programs which reshaped large sections of the city. The project was developed by the Equitable Life Assurance Society and built between 1950 and 1969.

In May 2013, the National Park Service designated a historic district named the "Pittsburgh Renaissance Historic District" which encompasses both the Gateway Center and neighboring Point State Park. All of the Gateway Center buildings were designated as contributing properties in the district except for one, the former State Office Building, which was considered to have lost its architectural integrity due to a 1980s remodeling.

== History ==
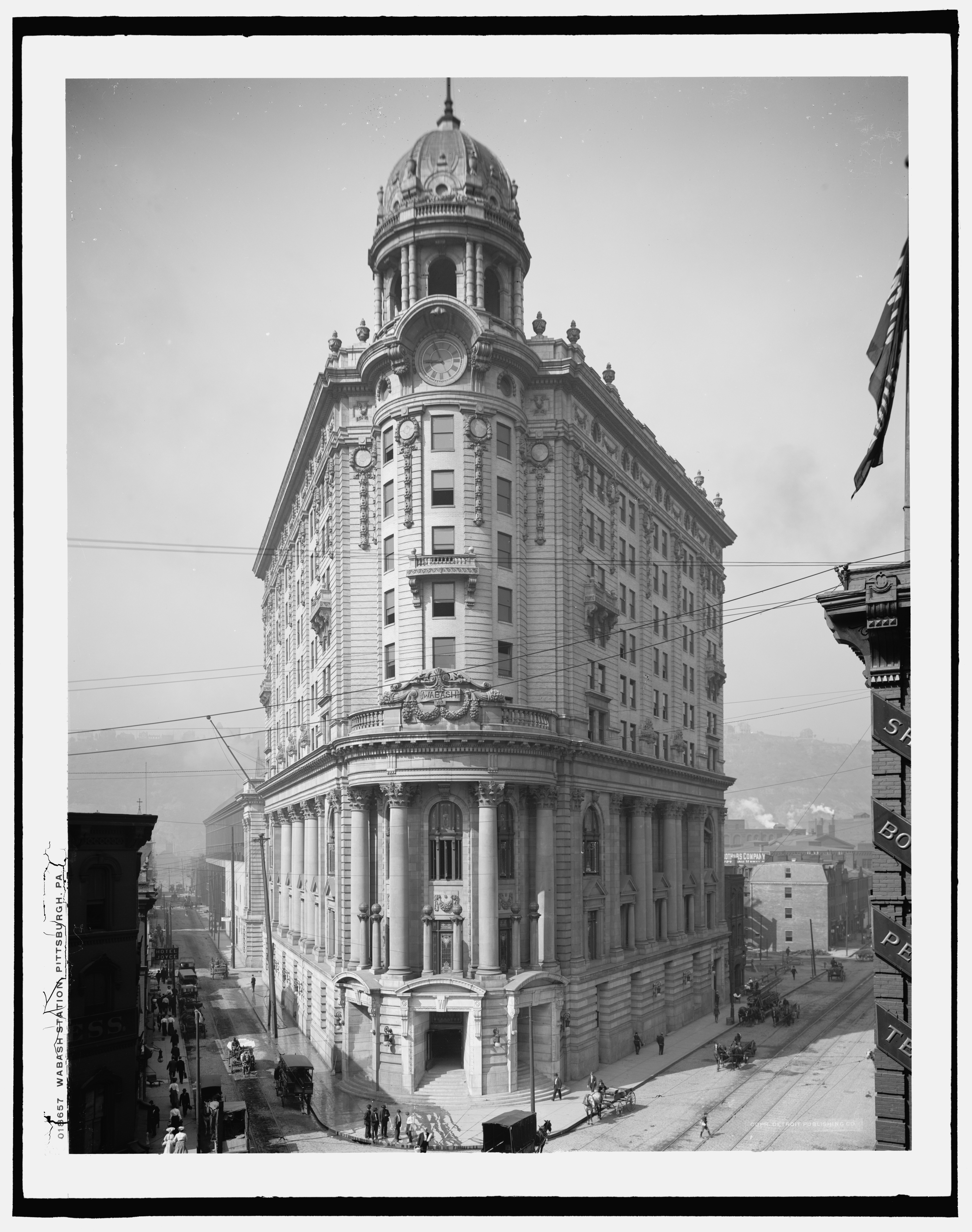
The Wabash Pittsburgh Terminal was demolished to make way for Gateway Center

Plans were developed during World War II to redevelop the dense and "blighted" forks of the Ohio River into both Point State Park and a "Gateway" of offices. It was announced as fully financed on September 21, 1949, when the Equitable Life Assurance Society agreed to underwrite the project after securing lease agreements from Westinghouse, Mellon Financial and other major corporations. On May 8, 1950, work began to clear the Gateway Center site for the new development. Although mainly a run down warehouse district the Center did require the demolition of the 1904 Beaux Arts 11 floor Wabash Pittsburgh Terminal.

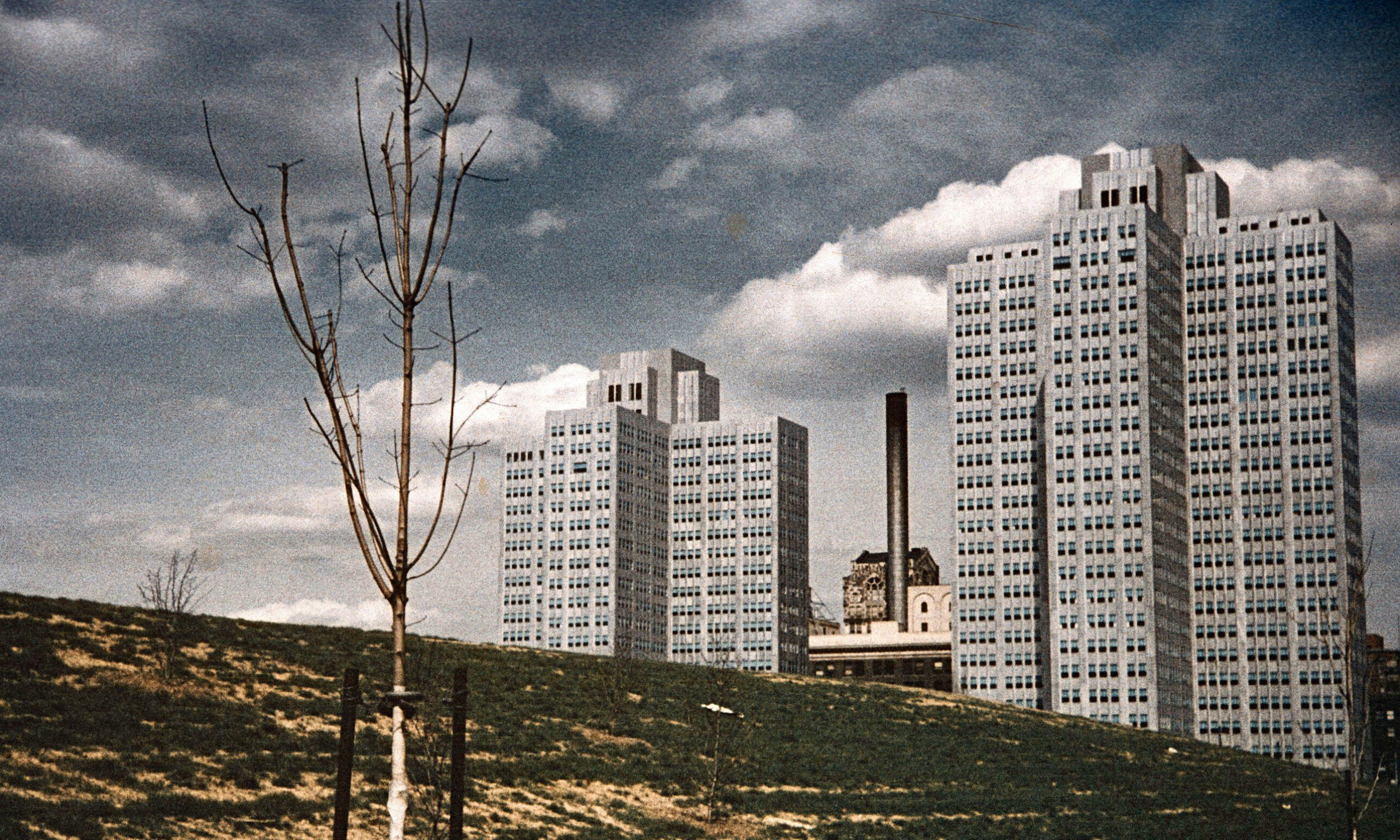
View of 1–3 Gateway Center looking east from Fort Duquesne shortly after construction in 1952.

Most of the existing streets and buildings were wiped away, giving the developers a clean slate to re-imagine the area as a "towers in a park" concept based on the urban planning ideas of Le Corbusier. The first three office buildings, One, Two, and Three Gateway Center, were completed in 1952. Eggers & Higgins, architects on the Jefferson Memorial, were the architects for the first three buildings. The Wyndham Grand Hotel was added in 1959, and Four Gateway Center was completed in 1960. The final building in the Gateway Center, the Westinghouse Building, was completed in 1969. In 2004, One, Two, Three, and Four Gateway Center were purchased by Hertz Investment Group, a Los Angeles, California, based real estate investment company, for US$55 million.

== Buildings ==
The original Gateway Center development included a total of ten buildings: eight office buildings, one residential building, and one hotel. One of the office buildings, the State Office Building, was later converted to residential use. As of 2021, Gateway Center consists of four buildings.

Name	Image	Location	Year built	Notes
One Gateway Center		420 Fort Duquesne Blvd.	1952	
Two Gateway Center		603 Stanwix St.	1952	
Three Gateway Center		401 Liberty Ave.	1952	
Four Gateway Center		444 Liberty Ave.	1960	
Gateway Towers		320 Fort Duquesne Blvd.	1964	No longer part of Gateway Center
Bell Telephone Company of Pennsylvania Western Headquarters Building		201 Stanwix St.	1957	No longer part of Gateway Center
River Vue (State Office Building)		300 Liberty Ave.	1957	No longer part of Gateway Center
Wyndham Grand Pittsburgh Downtown (Pittsburgh Hilton)		600 Commonwealth Pl.	1959	Not part of Gateway Center, but adjacent to the Gateway Center parklike plaza area
United Steelworkers Building (IBM Building)		60 Boulevard of the Allies	1964	No longer part of Gateway Center, but sometimes referred to as Five Gateway Center.
11 Stanwix Street (Westinghouse Building)		11 Stanwix St.	1969	No longer part of Gateway Center, but sometimes referred to as Six Gateway Center.

The 625 Stanwix Towers building is within the Gateway Center boundaries but was not an official part of the development. One other building on the site, the Pittsburgh Press Building, predates the Gateway Center project.

== Major tenants ==
- KDKA-TV studios in One Gateway Center (CBS Broadcast Center Pittsburgh).
- Gateway Health Plan in Four Gateway Center.
- Industrial Appraisal Company, corporate headquarters in Two Gateway Center

== See also ==
- Wabash Pittsburgh Terminal, former train terminal that previously occupied the site
- Gateway Center (PAT station)
