= Site of Old Hannastown =

Archaeological site in Hempfield Township, Pennsylvania

- U.S. National Register of Historic Places
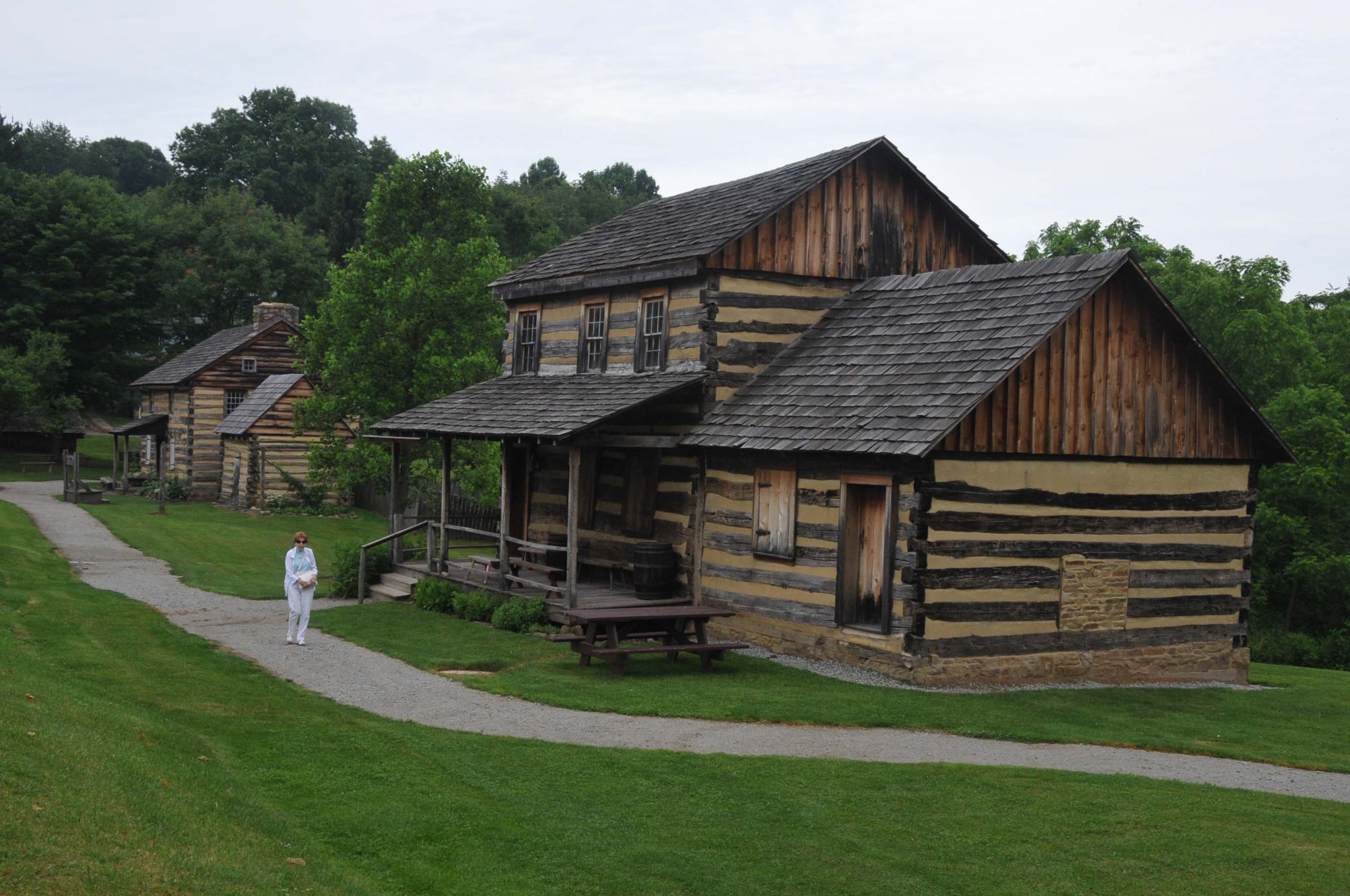

- Location within Pennsylvania Location within the United States
- Location: 4 miles (6.4 km) northeast of Greensburg, Hempfield Township, Pennsylvania
- Coordinates: 40°20′37″N 79°30′19″W
- Area: 182 acres (74 ha)
- Built: 1768
- NRHP reference No.: 72001180
- Added to NRHP: January 26, 1972

The site of Old Hannastown, also known as Historic Hanna's Town, is an American archaeological site and historic site located in Hempfield Township, Westmoreland County, Pennsylvania.

Hanna's Town was the site of the first English courts west of the Allegheny Mountains and served as the first seat of Westmoreland County between 1773 and 1787. It consisted of about thirty log houses, three taverns, a stockade fort, and other outbuildings. On May 16, 1775, residents of Westmoreland County wrote the Hanna's Town Resolves, proclaiming a willingness to take up arms against British rule. On July 13, 1782, Hanna's Town was destroyed by Seneca and British forces as part of one of the last engagements of the American Revolutionary War.

Hanna's Town was added to the National Register of Historic Places in 1972. Portions of the village that have been reconstructed are open as a museum. 180 acres of the original property are owned by Westmoreland County Parks and Recreation Department and interpreted by the Westmoreland Historical Society.

== History ==
=== Settlement ===
Following the Treaty of Fort Stanwix in 1768, the Pennsylvania Land Office began distributing land warrants west of the Allegheny Mountains. Around 1769, Robert Hanna acquired 337 acres that were then part of Bedford County, Pennsylvania, and established Hanna's Town.

Robert Hanna was born in Ulster, Ireland, in 1738, and later immigrated to Cumberland County, Pennsylvania. He moved to Hanna's Town with his wife, Elizabeth Hanna (née Kelly) and daughter Jane. Robert and Elizabeth welcomed three more daughters at Hanna's Town named Elizabeth, Susanna, and Margaret.

Hanna's Town was located along the Forbes Road, an important transportation route through Pennsylvania in the late 18th century. The Hannas opened a tavern where they hosted travelers. Robert Hanna sold lots to settlers moving west over the Allegheny Mountains. Log houses were required to be a minimum of 18-foot square.

Robert Hanna was politically active, serving on the first court of Bedford County in April 1771.

=== Seat of Westmoreland County ===
On February 26, 1773, Westmoreland County was formed out of Bedford County. At the time, Westmoreland County encompassed most of southwestern Pennsylvania, covering about 4,700 square miles. Robert Hanna was among the trustees appointed to choose a county seat and advocated for Hanna's Town. Hanna's Town was centrally located and the most important point between Pittsburgh and Ligonier. Other officials, including Arthur St. Clair, preferred Pittsburgh.

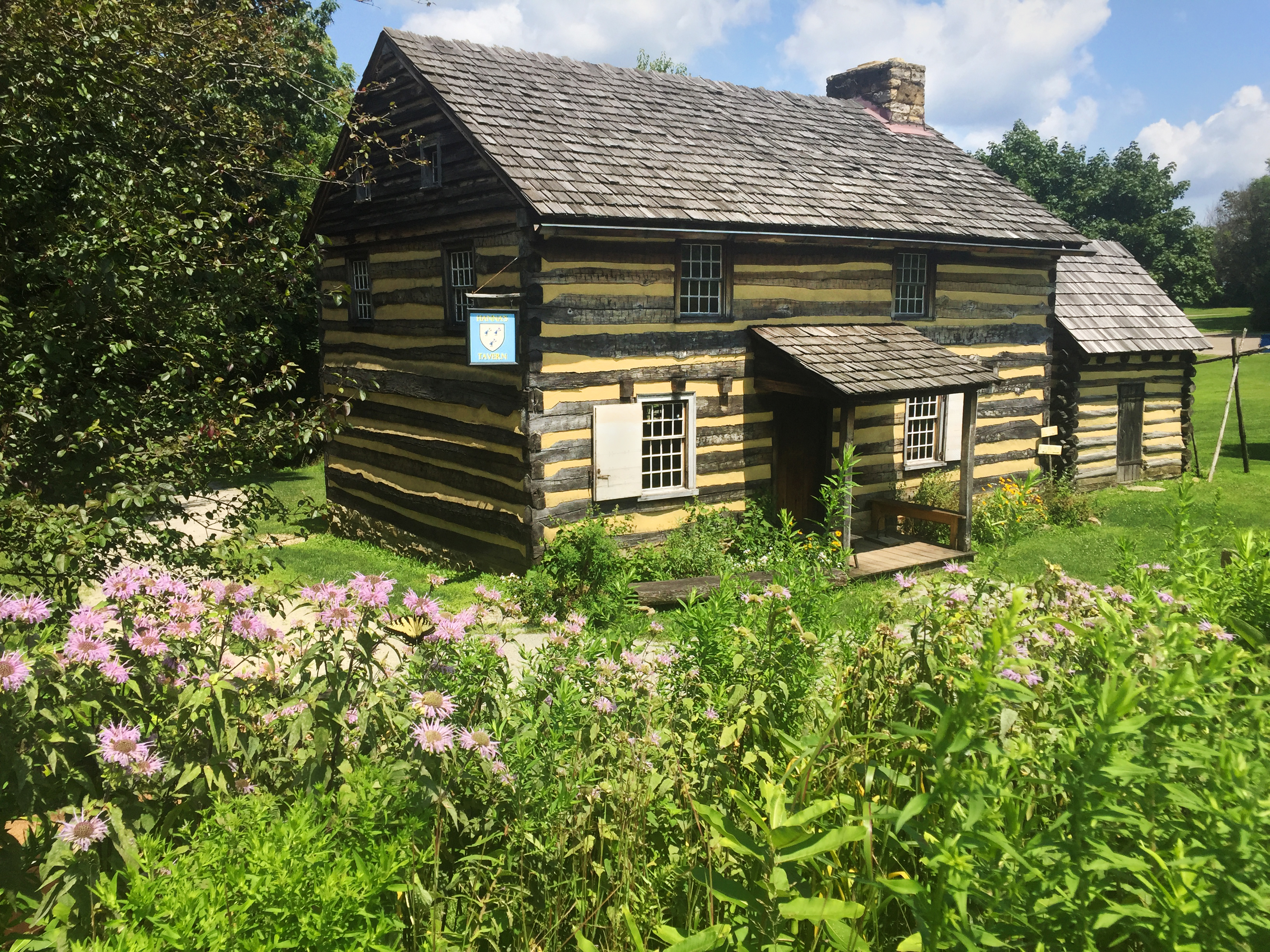
The reconstructed Hanna's Tavern, where court was held at Hanna's Town

According to the Westmoreland County charter, the “house of Robert Hanna” would be the location of the first elections and court proceedings until a formal courthouse and jail were erected. This made Hanna's Town the first seat of Westmoreland County and the site of the first English courts west of the Allegheny Mountains. The first Westmoreland County quarter session was held at "the house of Robert Hanna" on April 6, 1773. Robert Hanna served as one of the first court justices. Arthur St. Clair served as Westmoreland County's first prothonotary. By 1774, the county government erected a jail, whipping post, and pillory as part of the court justice system in Colonial America. Court continued to be held at Robert Hanna's house, and no formal courthouse was ever constructed.

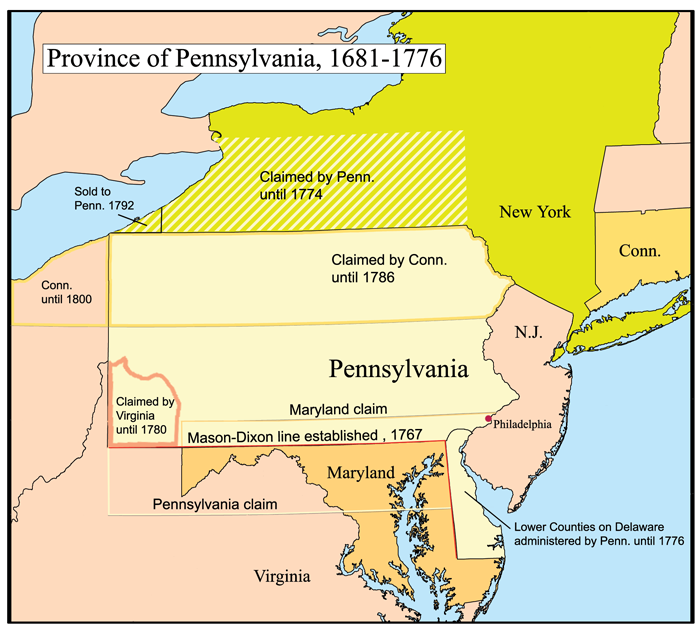
Map showing disputed territory in southwestern Pennsylvania

As the seat of Westmoreland County, Hanna's Town was caught in border disputes between Pennsylvania and Virginia. Both colonies laid claim to what is now southwestern Pennsylvania, citing their ambiguous founding documents. In 1773, Virginia's Lord Dunmore visited Pittsburgh and began planning to annex the region, which would later become the District of West Augusta. In January 1774, Lord Dunmore authorized Virginia representative John Connolly to form a militia and overtake the Pennsylvania courts. When word of Connolly recruiting for the Virginia militia reached Hanna's Town, Arthur St. Clair had Connolly arrested on January 24, 1774, and taken into custody at Hanna's Town. After he was released, Connolly led a force of 150 militiamen back to Hanna's Town and arrested several Westmoreland County justices. With increasing conflict, the first fort was built at Hanna's Town in 1774. On February 22, 1775, Westmoreland County justices Robert Hanna and James Cavet were arrested and jailed for three months for refusing to back the Virginia courts. This back-and-forth between those loyal to Pennsylvania and Virginia continued, with Hanna's Town often caught in the middle. It wasn't until 1779 that the new state of Virginia agreed to return most of the disputed lands to Pennsylvania.

In the 1770s and early 1780s, Hanna's Town rivaled Pittsburgh in terms of size, population, and political influence. According to archaeological and historical research, Hanna's Town at its height consisted of over 30 log homes, three taverns, a jail, a stockade fort and blockhouse, and numerous barns, stables, and outbuildings. Many families were of Scots-Irish descent. Enslaved people of African descent also lived at Hanna's Town, including 17-year-old Amynta, who was registered as being held in bondage by tavernkeepers Charles and Sarah Foreman in 1782.

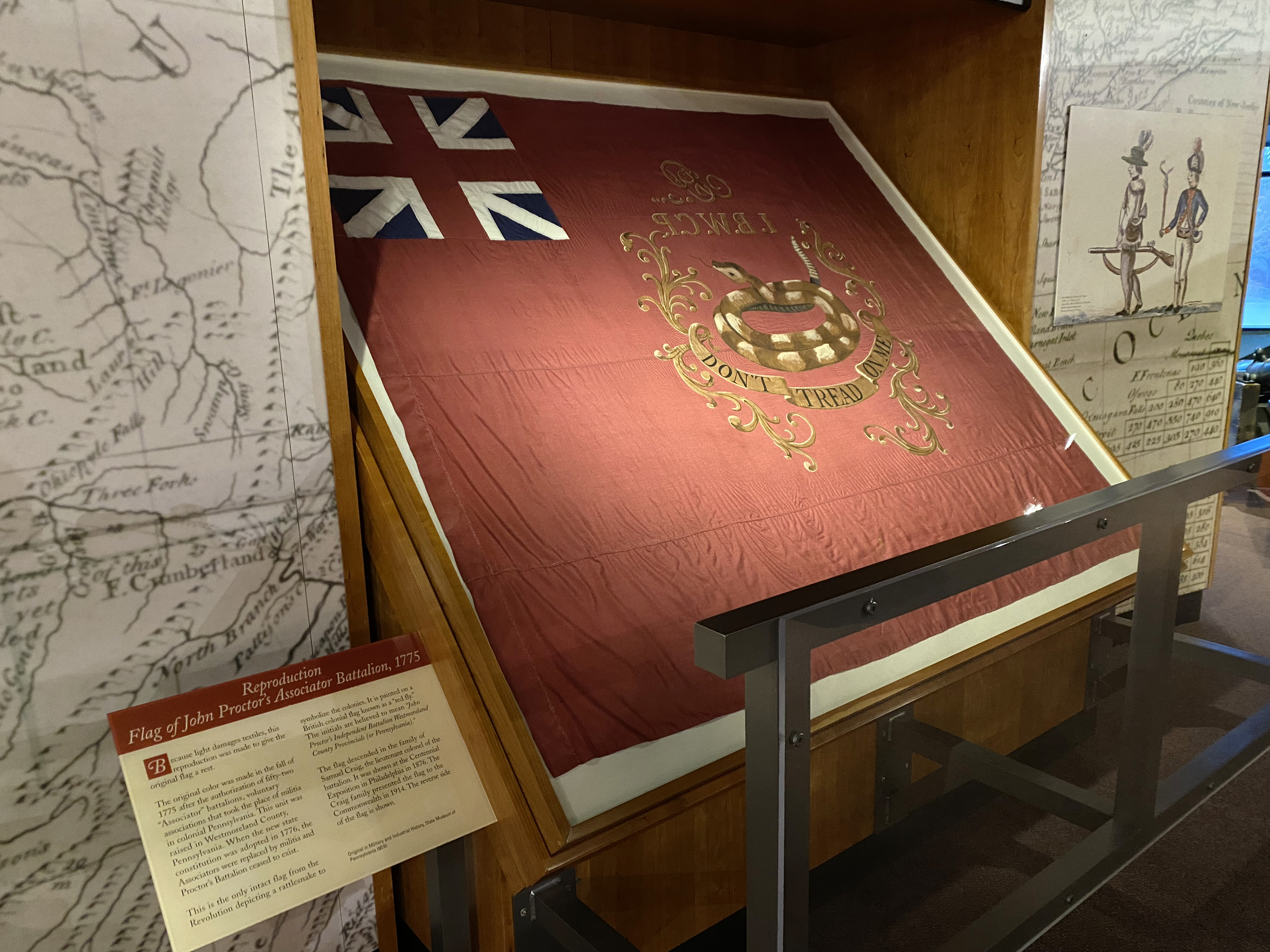
Reproduction flag of the Westmoreland County militia on display at the Fort Pitt Museum

=== Hanna's Town Resolves ===
Hanna's Town became a center of civic and military activity in western Pennsylvania following the Battles of Lexington and Concord in April 1775, which led to the outbreak of the American Revolutionary War. On May 16, 1775, Westmoreland County colonists gathered at Hanna's Town and drafted the Hanna's town resolves, a set of statements proclaiming a willingness to take up arms against British rule. In response, a county militia was established and based at Hanna's Town to defend the region. Robert Hanna was not present for the drafting of the Hanna's Town Resolves, as he was jailed amid the Pennsylvania-Virginia border dispute.

=== Destruction ===
Hanna's Town played an important role in the western theater of the American Revolutionary War. Militias were formed and trained at Hanna's Town, and sent to join larger forces combating British and their Native American allies. This military activity, along with the county courts, made Hanna's Town a potential target.

In 1777, the Continental Army regained control of Fort Pitt and established it as the Western Department headquarters. The British Army, meanwhile, had a station at Fort Niagara, sending forces to conduct raids in the Ohio Valley and draw the Continental Army from the east. Violence in the western theater continued to rise between the Continental Army, American militias, British Army, and Native Americans of varying allegiances and involvement. 1781 and 1782 were particularly violent years in the west, with events including Brodhead's Coshocton expedition, Lochry's Defeat, the Gnadenhutten massacre, and the Crawford expedition.

On July 13, 1782, at 2 p.m., Hanna's Town was attacked and destroyed by a force of Seneca warriors accompanied by a small contingent of British soldiers, totaling between 100 and 300 people. Historians theorize that the Seneca warrior and diplomat Sayenqueraghta planned the attack, accompanied by Seneca chief Guyasuta and the British Indian Department captains John Powell and Robert Lottridge Jr. The attack was possibly in response to Daniel Brodhead's invasion of Haudenosaunee (Iroquois) territory, which was supported by the Westmoreland County militia.

Residents of Hanna's Town took refuge in the stockade fort. Two residents died in the attack, one being 13-year-old Peggy Shaw, who was shot while rescuing a young boy. Several Seneca warriors were killed or wounded. Raiding parties also attacked Miller's Station, about 2.5 miles away, where a wedding was taking place. Among those in attendance were Robert Hanna's wife, Elizabeth, and their daughter, Jane, who were taken to Fort Niagara and later released.

=== Relocation of the county seat ===
Following the attack on July 13, 1782, Robert Hanna fought to keep the county seat permanently at Hanna's Town. Court continued to be held at Hanna's Town over the next few years, but efforts to rebuild the town were slow. Additionally, because no formal courthouse had been built since the county was established in 1773, the permanent location of the county seat was more up for debate.

The issue of the Westmoreland County seat made its way to the Pennsylvania legislature. In November 1784, a commission was formed to agree on a permanent location; a second and third commission were later needed for a final decision. The main contenders for the county seat were Hanna's Town, Pittsburgh, and Newtown (present-day Greensburg), all with representatives advocating to the commissions for their respective towns.

On December 10, 1785, Newtown was selected as the Westmoreland County seat. A new courthouse and jail were ready by July 1, 1786. Newtown was renamed Greensburg in 1786, and the first court session held there on January 7, 1787.The location of the county seat remained contentious among officials who sought to raise Pittsburgh's status, eventually leading to the formation of Allegheny County in 1788.

Hanna's Town never fully recovered from the 1782 attack.

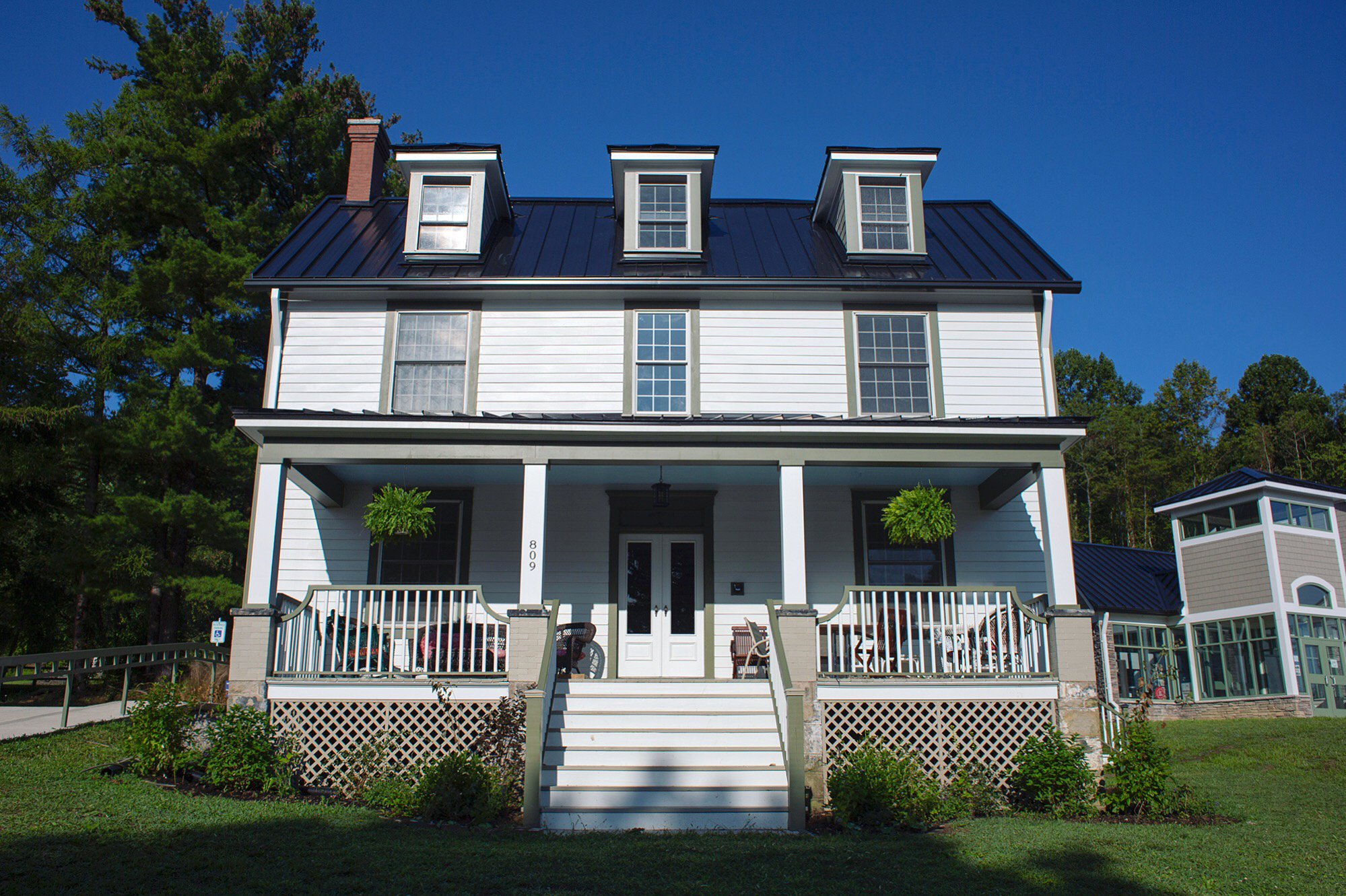
The 1910 Steel Farmhouse at Historic Hanna's Town, today housing the offices of the Westmoreland Historical Society

=== Steel family farm ===
In 1826, the Hanna's Town property was purchased by John Steel. His son, William Steel, divided the property into the Hannastown Courthouse Farm (the site of the historic village) and the Hannastown Farm. These properties were farmed for over a century. Today, the Hannastown Farm property is privately owned and is also listed on the National Register of Historic Places. At the Hannastown Courthouse Farm, the Steel family raised beef cattle. Around 1910, Judge John Steel constructed a farmhouse.

=== Archaeological excavations and reconstruction ===
In the 1960s, the Westmoreland Historical Society began working with Westmoreland County to purchase a portion of the Hanna's Town property from the Steel family and develop it as an historic site. In 1969, Westmoreland County acquired 183 acres of property where the village was located. The Westmoreland Historical Society oversaw plans to conduct archaeological excavations and reconstruct historic structures.

The first archaeological excavations began under the leadership of Jacob L. Grimm, who had led excavations of Fort Ligonier. Grimm and his team of professional and volunteer archaeologists identified the location of Hanna's Tavern. In 1970, a field school led by James Richardson III of the University of Pittsburgh identified the location of Foreman's Tavern. In more than 50 years of archaeological investigations, an estimated 1 million artifacts have been recovered and the foundations of several structures have been identified.

Hanna's Tavern was reconstructed using historic techniques in 1973, in celebration of Westmoreland County's bicentennial.

== Historic site and museum ==
Historic Hanna's Town preserves 180 acres of the original 337 acres of Robert Hanna's property. The site includes the reconstructed Hanna's Tavern, several relocated 18th-century log houses, a reconstructed stockade fort and blockhouse, a blacksmith shop, and a wagon shed housing an authentic late 18th century Conestoga wagon. The Westmoreland History Education Center, completed in 2019, houses an exhibit gallery, research library, and museum collections.

The site is maintained and opened to the public by the nonprofit Westmoreland Historical Society and the Westmoreland County Parks and Recreation. The county historical society moved its headquarters to Historic Hanna's Town in 2019, and oversees historical interpretation and programs.

== See also ==
- Hanna's Town Resolves
- Western theater of the American Revolutionary War
- District of West Augusta
- Fort Pitt
