= State Office Building =

State Office Building may refer to:

- State Office Building (Denver, Colorado), in Civic Center Historic District (Denver, Colorado) (or Denver Civic Center)
- State Office Building (Lansing, Michigan), listed on the National Register of Historic Places in Ingham County, Michigan
- Alfred E. Smith Building (formerly the State Office Building), in Albany, New York
- State Office Building (Binghamton, New York), infamous for a 1981 fire where a transformer explosion contaminated the building with PCBs, leading to a 13-year cleanup effort
- Pittsburgh State Office Building, in Pittsburgh, Pennsylvania
- State Office Building (Madison, Wisconsin), listed on the National Register of Historic Places in Dane County, Wisconsin
- State Office Block, Sydney, former Government Offices in New South Wales

== See also ==
- State Tower Building, a 1928 high-rise building located in Syracuse, New York
