= Verizon Building (disambiguation) =

Verizon Building usually refers to the Verizon Building in Lower Manhattan, New York City.

It may also refer to:

- Verizon Building (1095 Avenue of the Americas) in Midtown Manhattan, New York City, which serves as Verizon's corporate headquarters
- One Verizon Way in Basking Ridge, New Jersey, which serves as Verizon's operational headquarters
- Verizon Building (Pearl Street) or 375 Pearl Street or One Brooklyn Bridge Plaza in Lower Manhattan, New York City
- Verizon Building (Pittsburgh) or Bell Telephone Company of Pennsylvania Western Headquarters Building
