= Gateway Towers =

Mixed-use high-rise in Pittsburgh, Pennsylvania

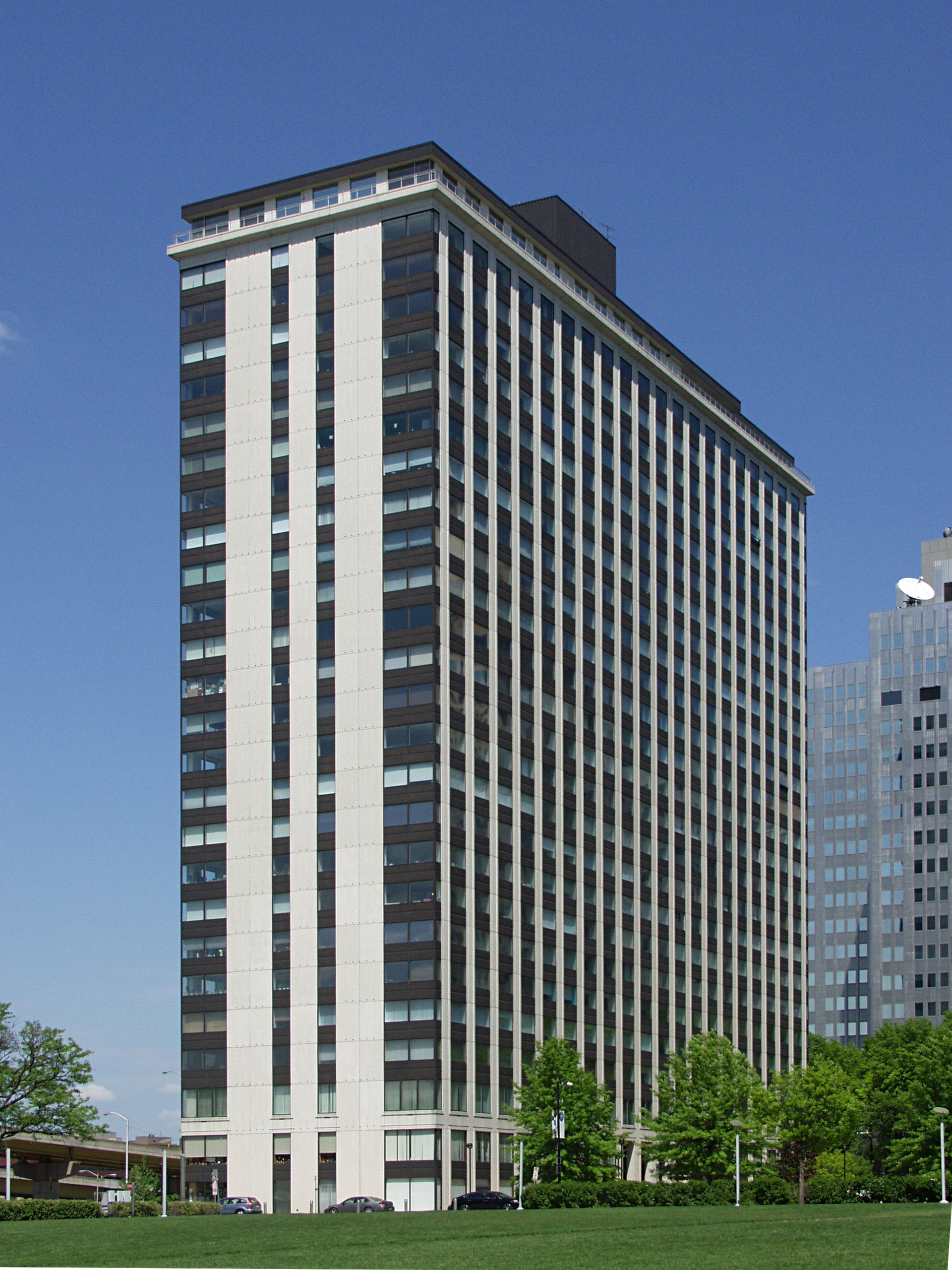
- A view of the Gateway Towers from Point State Park

- Location within Pittsburgh

General information
- Type: Mixed-use high-rise
- Location: Downtown Pittsburgh; Allegheny County; Pennsylvania; United States, 320 Fort Duquesne Boulevard; Pittsburgh, PA 15222-1121
- Coordinates: 40°26′33.5″N 80°0′24.3″W
- Completed: 1964
- Cost: $10 million
- Owner: Gateway Towers Condominium Association, Inc. (Residential HOA); Gateway Towers Executive Office Condominium (Commercial COA)
- Operator: FirstService Residential (Residential HOA); Acri Community Realty (Commercial COA)

Technical details
- Floor count: 27

Design and construction
- Architect: Emery Roth & Sons
- Developer: Equitable Life Assurance Society of the United States
- Gateway Towers
- U.S. Historic district – Contributing property
- Part of: Pittsburgh Renaissance Historic District (ID13000252)
- Added to NRHP: May 2, 2013

Gateway Towers is a 26-story mixed-use high-rise located beside Point State Park, Gateway Center, Wyndham Grand Hotel, and Allegheny Riverfront Park in Downtown Pittsburgh, Pennsylvania. Constructed between late 1962 and mid-1964, it was built as a luxury apartment and executive office building by the Equitable Life Assurance Society of the United States.

During 1979–1980, it was converted to luxury condominiums by Commonwealth Fort. By 1987, the 94 remaining units were sold by auction. The building underwent a $3 million capital improvement in 2006. Overall, it has 560,000 square feet (52,000 m^{2}) in 308 residential units.
