= Cecil Township, Pennsylvania =

Township in Pennsylvania, US

Coordinates: 40°19′N 80°12′W

- Township
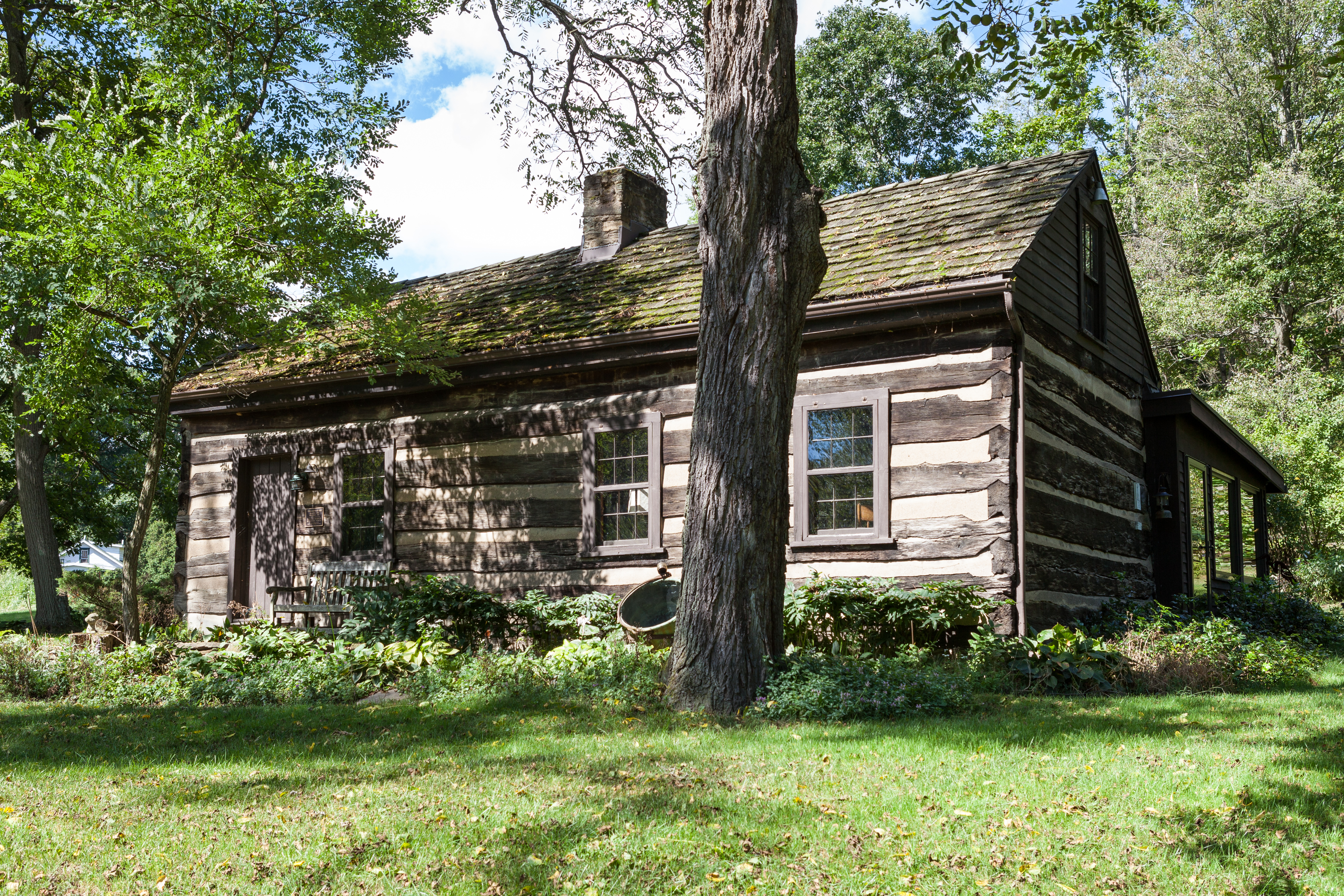
- The Stephenson-Campbell House, a historic site in the township

- Seal

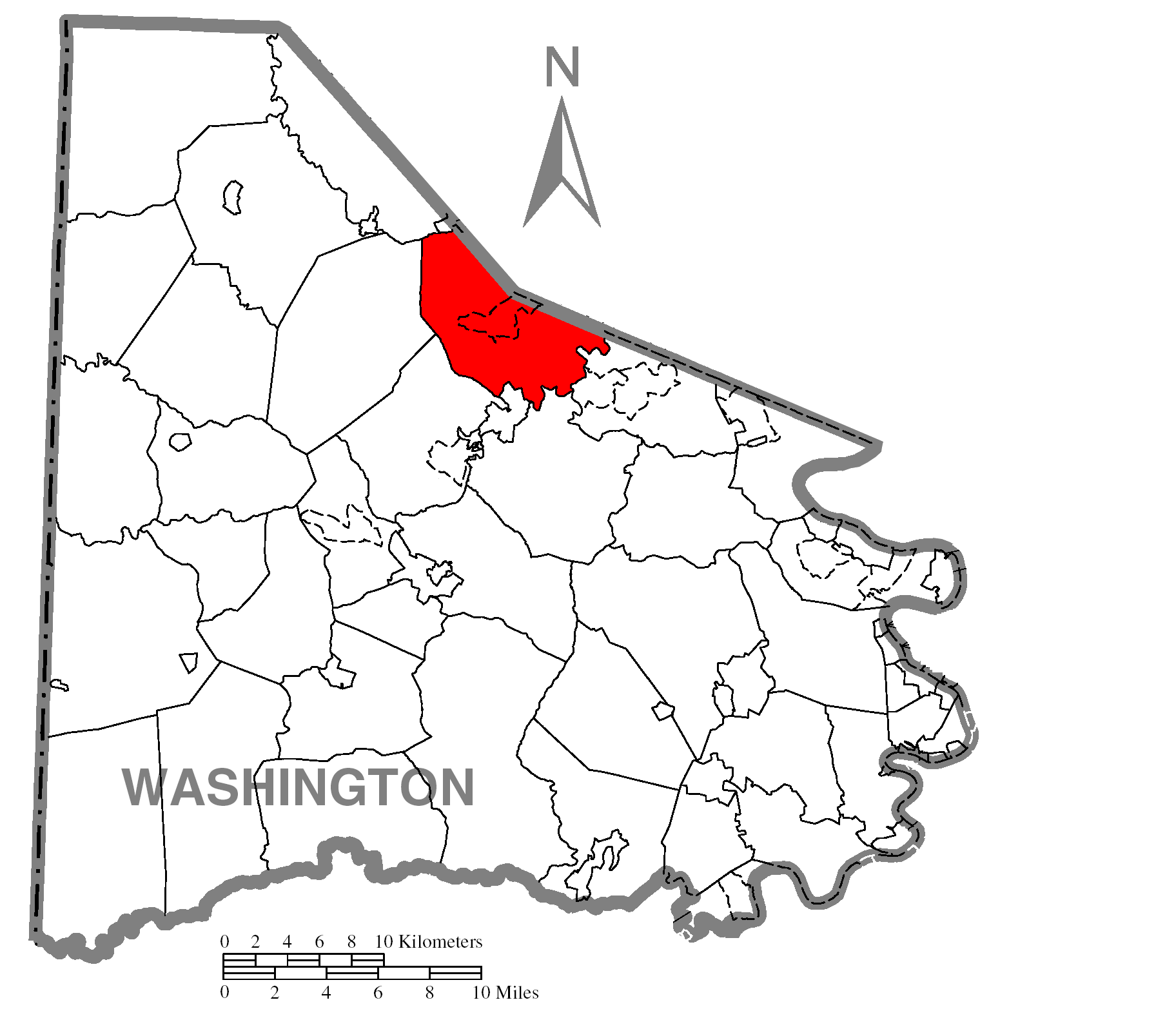
- Map of Washington County, Pennsylvania highlighting Cecil Township

- Map of Washington County, Pennsylvania
- Country: United States
- State: Pennsylvania
- County: Washington
- Established: July 15, 1781

Government
  - Type: Council
  - Chairman: Andrew Schrader

Area
  - Total: 26.38 sq mi (68.32 km^{2})
  - Land: 26.30 sq mi (68.11 km^{2})
  - Water: 0.081 sq mi (0.21 km^{2})

Population (2020)
  - Total: 14,609 ▲
  - Estimate (2023): 15,065
  - Density: 472.0/sq mi (182.23/km^{2})
- Time zone: UTC-5 (Eastern (EST))
  - Summer (DST): UTC-4 (EDT)
- ZIP code: 15057, 15317, 15321, 15350, 15361
- Area code: 724
- FIPS code: 42-125-11800
- Website: Cecil Township

Historical population
Census	Pop.	Note	%±
2000	9,756		—
2010	11,271		15.5%
2020	14,609		29.6%
2025 (est.)	15,190		4.0%
U.S. Decennial Census

Cecil Township is a township in Washington County, Pennsylvania, United States. It is a suburb in the Pittsburgh metropolitan area. The population was 14,609 at the 2020 census. The township contains the Southpointe suburban business park; companies based there include Ansys, Consol Energy, Millcraft Industries and Mylan. Cecil Township is served by the Canon-McMillan School District.

== History ==
The Stephenson-Campbell House was listed on the National Register of Historic Places in 2002.

== Geography ==
According to the United States Census Bureau, the township has a total area of 26.4 square miles (68 km^{2}) of which 26.3 square miles (68 km^{2}) is land and 0.1 square miles (0.26 km^{2}) or 0.27% is water.

=== Villages within Cecil Township ===
Bishop, Cowden, Gladden Heights, Hendersonville, Lawrence, Laurel Hill, Murray Hill, Muse, Southview, Van Emman, Venice

=== Surrounding neighborhoods ===
Cecil Township has eight borders, including McDonald to the north-northwest, Robinson Township to the northwest, Mount Pleasant Township to the west and west-southwest, Chartiers Township to the southwest, Canonsburg to the south, North Strabane Township to the south-southeast, Peters Township to the east, and South Fayette Township (Allegheny County) to the north.

== Demographics ==
As of the census of 2000, there were 9,756 people, 3,794 households, and 2,879 families residing in the township. The population density was 370.3 inhabitants per square mile (143.0/km^{2}). There were 4,005 housing units at an average density of 152.0 per square mile (58.7/km^{2}). The racial makeup of the township was 81.42% White, 15.58% African American, 0.08% Native American, 2.25% Asian, 0.04% Pacific Islander, 0.13% from other races, and 0.50% from two or more races. Hispanic or Latino of any race were 0.53% of the population.

There were 3,794 households, out of which 32.2% had children under the age of 18 living with them, 64.0% were married couples living together, 8.7% had a female householder with no husband present, and 24.1% were non-families. 20.6% of all households were made up of individuals, and 7.9% had someone living alone who was 65 years of age or older. The average household size was 2.57 and the average family size was 2.98.

In the township the population was spread out, with 23.3% under the age of 18, 6.2% from 18 to 24, 31.4% from 25 to 44, 25.8% from 45 to 64, and 13.3% who were 65 years of age or older. The median age was 39 years. For every 100 females there were 94.8 males. For every 100 females age 18 and over, there were 92.4 males.

The median income for a household in the township was $50,616, and the median income for a family was $54,562. Males had a median income of $42,232 versus $27,857 for females. The per capita income for the township was $22,340. About 4.4% of families and 5.2% of the population were below the poverty line, including 5.3% of those under age 18 and 6.3% of those age 65 or over.

== Notable people ==
- Ray Kemp, professional football player
- Archie Strimel, soccer goalkeeper
