= Pittsburgh Renaissance Historic District =

Historic district in Pennsylvania, United States

- U.S. National Register of Historic Places
- U.S. Historic district
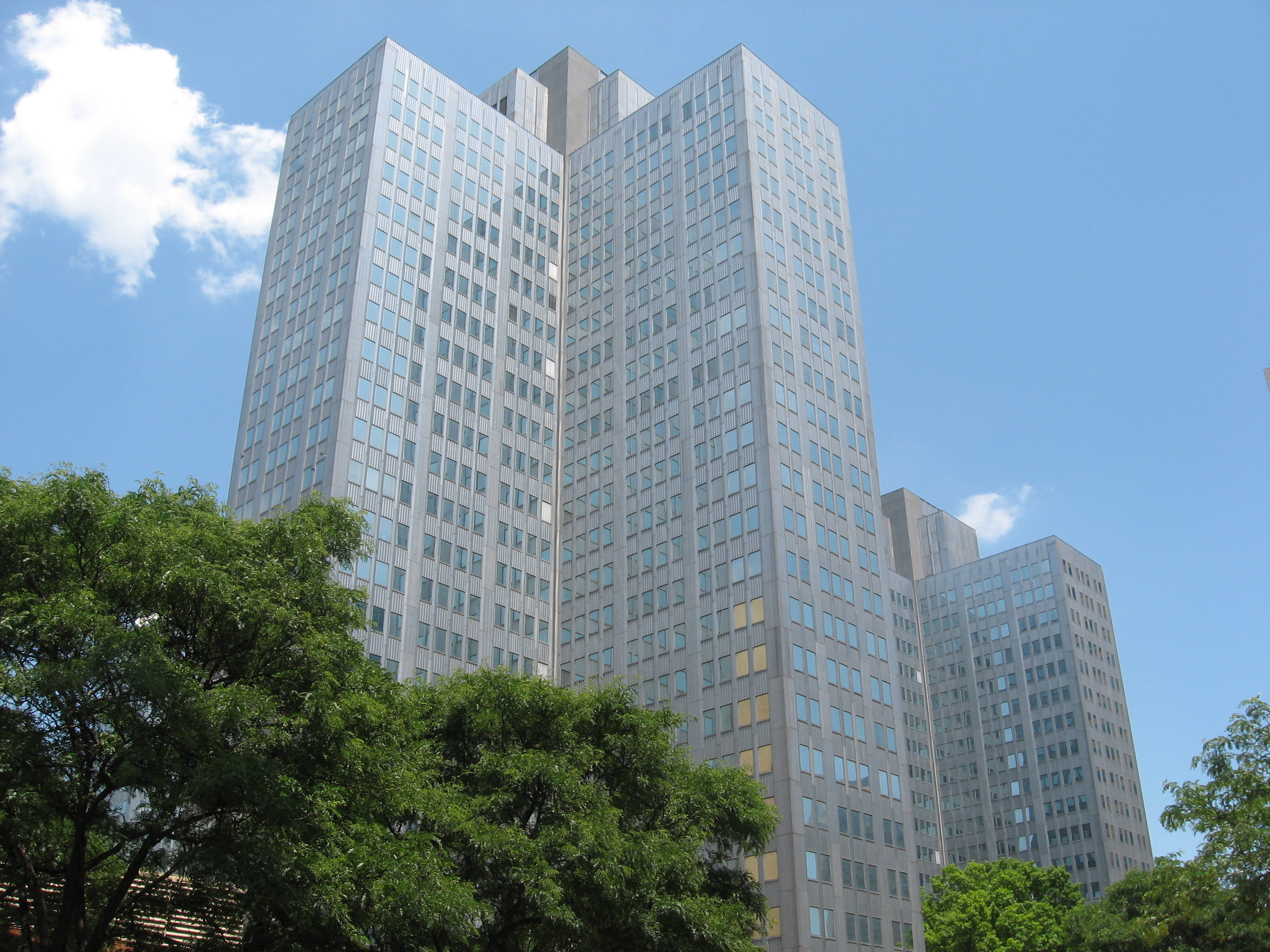
- Three Gateway Center, Gateway Plaza complex

- Location within Pennsylvania
- Location: Roughly bounded by Stanwix Street, Allegheny, Monongahela and Ohio Rivers, Pittsburgh, Pennsylvania
- Coordinates: 40°26′28.54″N 80°0′24.87″W
- Architect: Multiple
- NRHP reference No.: 13000252
- Added to NRHP: May 2, 2013

The Pittsburgh Renaissance Historic District is a historic district in the Central Business District of Pittsburgh, Pennsylvania, United States. It was listed on the National Register of Historic Places on May 2, 2013.

== History ==
Bounded by Stanwix Street and the Allegheny, Monongahela and Ohio Rivers, the Pittsburgh Renaissance Historic District was listed on the National Register of Historic Places on May 2, 2013. It includes within its boundary the Forks of the Ohio, as well as Gateway Center, the Bell Telephone Company Building, and the Pittsburgh Post-Gazette Building which was constructed in 1927.

== Contributing properties ==
The historic district contains fifteen contributing resources including the following:

- Nine of the ten Gateway Center buildings:
  - One and Two Gateway Center (1952)
  - Three Gateway Center (1952)
  - Bell Telephone Company of Pennsylvania Western Headquarters Building (1957)
  - Hilton Pittsburgh (1959)
  - Four Gateway Center (1960)
  - Gateway Towers (1964)
  - IBM Building (1964)
  - Westinghouse Electric Corporation Headquarters (1969)
- Point State Park (1974), including the following structures:
  - Fort Pitt Block House (1764)
  - Fort Pitt Museum (1969)
- Two buildings within the district boundaries which were not part of the Gateway Center or Point State Park projects, but within the period of significance:
  - Pittsburgh Press Building (1927; remodeled in 1962)
  - Allegheny Towers (1967)

The only non-contributing properties within the district boundaries are the former State Office Building (1957), which was considered to have lost its architectural integrity due to a 1980s remodeling, and the Gateway light rail station, which was built in 2012.

== See also ==
- National Register of Historic Places listings in Pittsburgh, Pennsylvania
