= IBM Building (Pittsburgh) =

- U.S. National Register of Historic Places
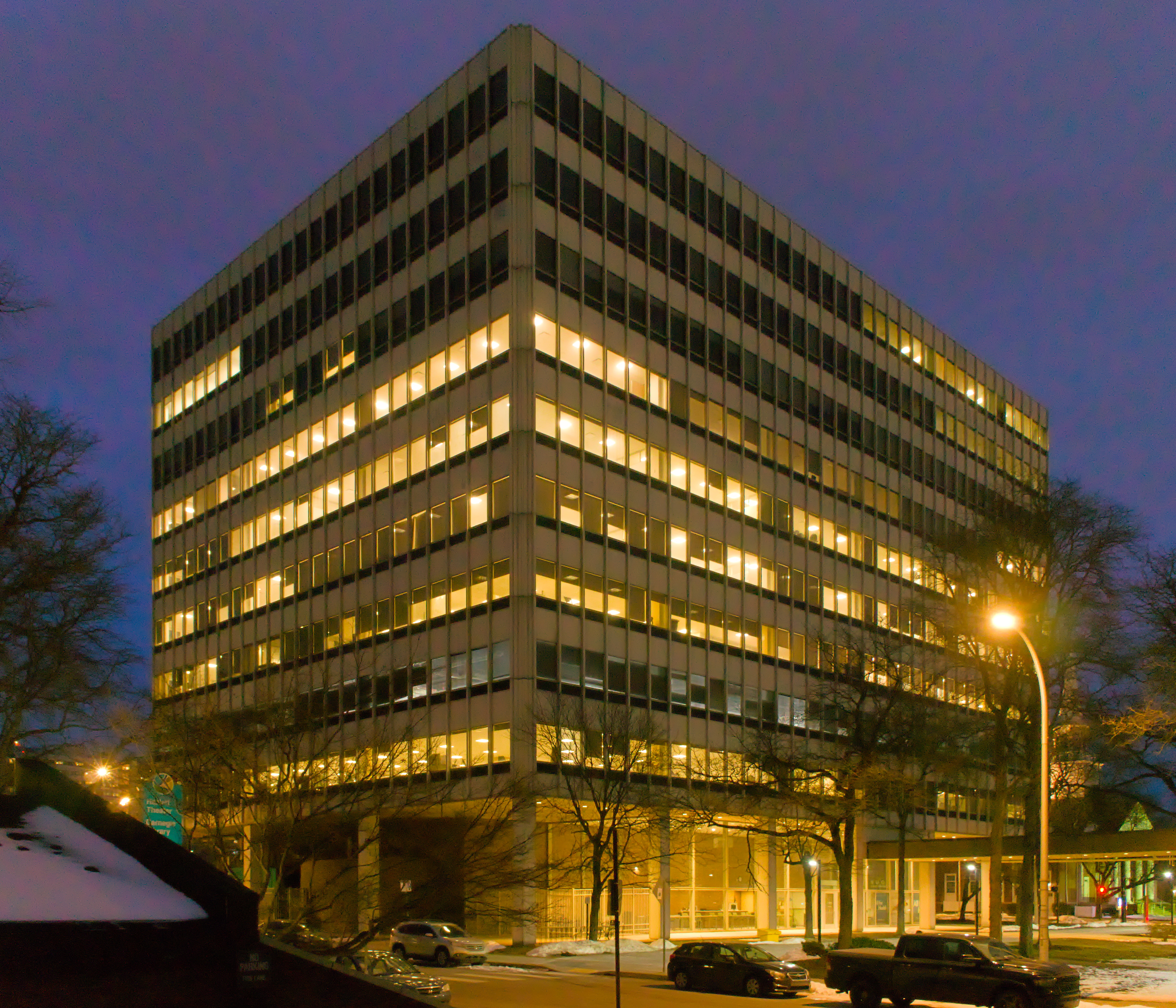
- The building in 2026

- Location within Pittsburgh Location within Pennsylvania Location within the United States
- Location: 4 Allegheny Center, Pittsburgh, Pennsylvania
- Coordinates: 40°27′12″N 80°0′14″W
- Built: 1976
- Architect: Bruno Conterato
- Architectural style: International Style
- NRHP reference No.: 100012666
- Added to NRHP: January 30, 2026

The IBM Building, also known as the East Commons Professional Building, is an office building in the Allegheny Center neighborhood of Pittsburgh, Pennsylvania. It was built in 1975–6 as part of the Allegheny Center urban renewal project, which razed over 500 buildings to build a modernist shopping, residential, and office complex. It originally housed offices for IBM, replacing the old IBM Building in Gateway Center, which had been sold to the United Steelworkers. The building was listed on the National Register of Historic Places in 2026.

The IBM Building consists of a nine-story rectangular block, clad in glass and aluminum curtain walls and raised on pilotis above a recessed ground floor. According to the National Register nomination, the building is a notable example of International Style architecture. It was designed by the firm of noted modernist Ludwig Mies van der Rohe, though Mies himself had died in 1969. Bruno Conterato (1920–1995), one of three students of Mies who continued the firm after his death, was the architect of record.
