= Millcraft Investments =

American real estate company

Millcraft Industries, Inc.
- Type: Commercial real estate
- Headquarters: Cecil Township, Pennsylvania, U.S.
- Key people: Jack B. Piatt (chairman)
- Website: millcraftideas.com

Millcraft Investments previous logo

Former logo prior to re-branding effort

Millcraft Industries, Inc. is a real estate and development company based in the Pittsburgh suburb of Cecil Township, Pennsylvania.

== History ==
Millcraft began as a steel production company before expanding into real estate. In 2005, following a deal with Hilton Hotels and an expanding commercial real estate business, Millcraft formally exited the steel industry.

In 2012, The Wall Street Journal praised Millcraft's River Vue apartment building as being part of a renewed push for livability in Downtown Pittsburgh.

In 2008, Millcraft CFO Brian Walker, won the Pittsburgh Business Times CFO of the Year award in the "Large private company" category. The award was largely the result of Walker's ability to use the New Markets Tax Credit Program to finance previously impossible projects in Downtown Pittsburgh.

In March 2009, Millcraft purchased the Pittsburgh State Office Building. The sale was criticized by Pennsylvania State Auditor General Jack Wagner, who noted that the $4.6 million sale price was half its appraised value. He said that the plan would cost the taxpayers nearly $55 million in leases to move state workers to other buildings.

The company owns and developed the Southpointe complex and "The Crossroads Project," a $100 Million renovation of the streets of Downtown Washington, Pennsylvania.

In 2018, the company began developing a $700 million mixed-use project called the Esplanade. The project is to be located on the Ohio River in the North Side neighborhood of Pittsburgh, Pennsylvania, with development plans including a Ferris Wheel, marina, ice skating rink, splash park, man-made lake, and four towers that will include a hotel, condominiums and apartments. The company received $10 million in state funding toward the project in 2022, after purchasing 5.5 acres of property from the city's Urban Redevelopment Authority. The official ground breaking ceremony took place in December 2025, and the project anticipated to open in 2028.

In 2022, the company rebranded to Piatt Companies as part of its 65th anniversary and in honor of its founder, Jack Piatt.
