= Southpointe, Pennsylvania =

Census designated place near Canonsburg, Pennsylvania

- Unincorporated community Census designated place
- Location within Pennsylvania Location within the United States
- Coordinates: 40°16′22.8″N 80°9′46.8″W
- Country: United States
- State: Pennsylvania
- County: Washington
- Township: Cecil

Area
  - Total: 2.5681 sq mi (6.651 km^{2})
  - Land: 2.2571 sq mi (5.846 km^{2})
  - Water: 0.0110 sq mi (0.028 km^{2})
- Elevation: 981 ft (299 m)
- Time zone: UTC-5 (Eastern (EST))
  - Summer (DST): UTC-4 (EDT)
- FIPS code: 42-72424
- GNIS feature ID: 2830907

Southpointe is an unincorporated community and census designated place (CDP) in Cecil Township, Washington County, Pennsylvania.

== History ==
The foundation of the community began with the development of a 589-acre (238 ha) suburban business park located in Cecil Township near Canonsburg, Pennsylvania, south of Pittsburgh and is a familiar landmark along Interstate 79. It is home to many corporations, including Fortune 500 members CONSOL Energy and Viatris as well as Ansys.

Planning for what would become Southpointe began in the 1980s, as the Washington County Redevelopment Authority in partnership with the RIDC began to pursue a tract of land in Cecil Township that had been the site of the Western Center, a reform school and a state mental hospital. The property for the first phase, Southpointe I, was acquired in 1986, with construction beginning in 1993. The location was chosen because of its access to Interstate 79, its proximity to Pittsburgh and low tax rates. By 2013, Southpointe had become filled and the second phase, Southpointe II neared completion, with 800 acres (320 ha) across both. A third phase is planned for the other side of Interstate 79, to be called Cool Valley Industrial Park.

It was developed by Millcraft Industries

Since the development of the Marcellus Shale in the Appalachian region, Southpointe has also become home to many natural gas producers, including Range Resources, Noble Energy, EQT Corporation and other service companies related to the industry.

Southpointe is also home to the PrintScape Arena at Southpointe, which was the main practice and training facility for the Pittsburgh Penguins from May 20, 1995, until 2015. From 2010 to 2014 its golf course (Southpointe Golf Club) hosted the Mylan Classic, a PGA TOUR sanctioned event on the Web.com Tour (now Korn Ferry Tour).

== Demographics ==
Historical population
Census	Pop.	Note	%±
U.S. Decennial Census

The United States Census Bureau first defined Southpointe as a census designated place in 2023.
