= District of West Augusta =

Historical American geographic region

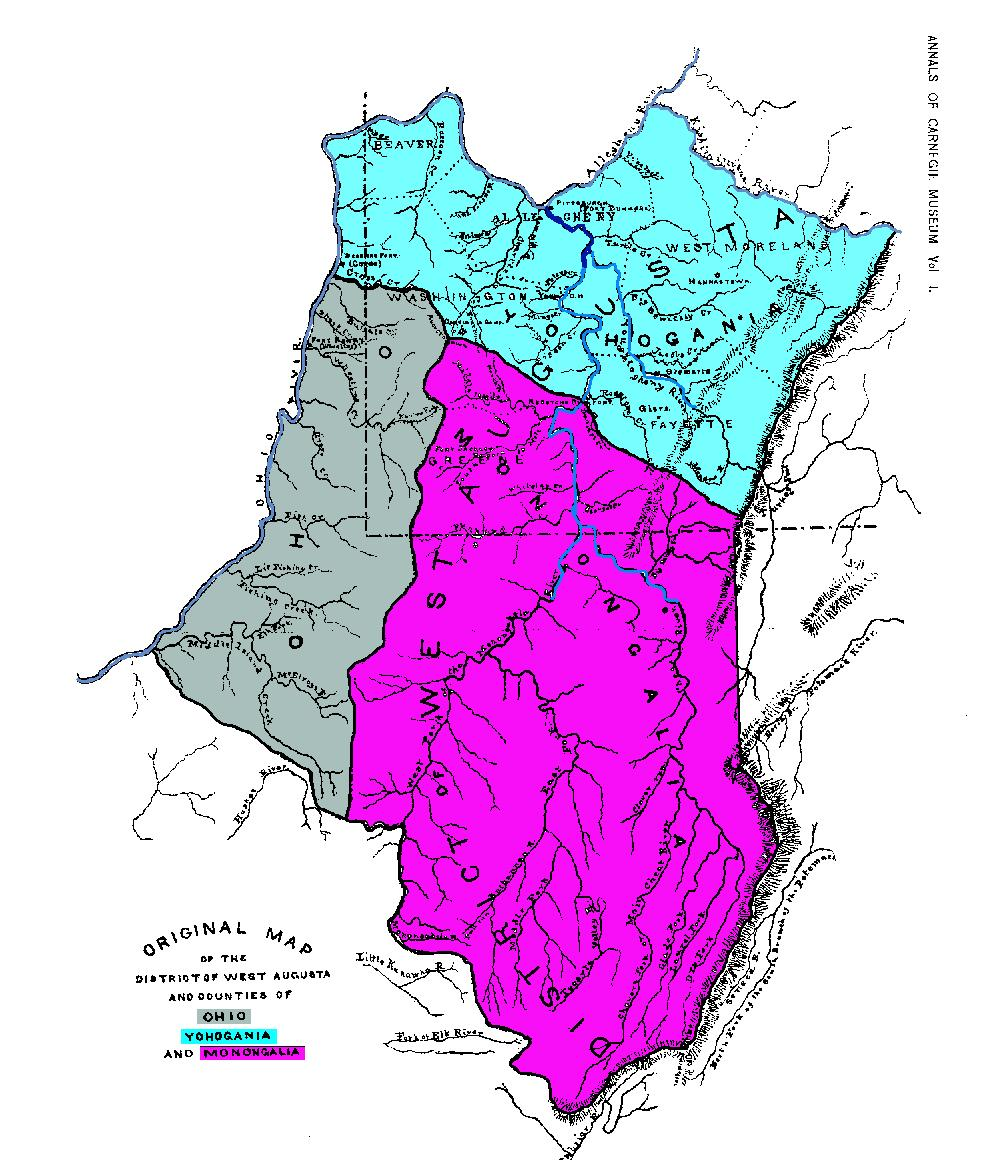
Map of the District of West Augusta and the three counties formed from it in 1776.

The District of West Augusta was a short-lived (1774–76) historical region of Colonial Virginia that encompassed much of what is now northern West Virginia and southwestern Pennsylvania.

== History ==
Augusta Town
- Location within Pennsylvania
- 40.15099°N 80.31753°W
- Location: U.S. 40, 3 miles SW of Washington, Pennsylvania

Before the Colony of Virginia and the Province of Pennsylvania agreed to extend the Mason–Dixon line westward from the western boundary line of the Province of Maryland, both claimed a large area of what is now southwestern Pennsylvania.

The area was sparsely populated in the years following the French and Indian War (1754–63), and neither colony made any serious attempts at forming a local government until the early 1770s. Virginia administered the region as a part of Augusta County, Virginia. Pennsylvania later established Westmoreland County with its seat at Hanna's Town, overlapping Virginia's claims.

Virginia's governor, Lord Dunmore, traveled to Pittsburgh, which Virginia claimed as part of its territory, to appoint government officials under the Virginia charter. In 1774, the Virginia assembly separated the western portion of Augusta County's territory and formed the District of West Augusta.

The preamble to a later act defined the boundaries of West Augusta as follows:

Whereas, it is expedient to ascertain the boundary between the county of Augusta and the district of West Augusta-Be it therefore enacted by the General Assembly of the Commonwealth of Virginia, that the boundary between the said district and county shall be as follows:

Beginning on the Alleghany Mountains, between the heads of the Potomac, Cheat and Green Briar Rivers (Haystack Knob, or north end of Pocahontas County);

thence along the ridge of mountains which divides the waters of Cheat River from those of Green Briar, and that branch of the Monongahela River called Tyger's Valley River, to the Monongahela River;

thence up the said river, and the west fork thereof, to Bingerman's Creek, on the northwest side of the said west fork;

thence up the said creek to the head thereof,

thence in a direct course to the head of Middle Island Creek, a branch of the Ohio,

and thence to the Ohio, including all the waters of said creek in the aforesaid District of West Augusta, all that territory lying to the northward of the aforesaid boundary, and to the westward of the States of Pennsylvania and Maryland, shall be deemed, and is hereby declared to be, within the District of West Augusta.

The following several years were contentious. Local officials from Virginia arrested their counterparts from Pennsylvania and vice versa. Each state made movements to stem the flow of settlers from the other state.

The government of West Augusta was administered from Fort Dunmore in what is now Pittsburgh. The seat of government was later moved to Augusta Town in what is now Washington County, Pennsylvania. In August 1776, Augusta Town became the site of the first court west of the Monongahela River.

In 1776, the District of West Augusta was divided into three counties: Ohio County, Monongalia County, and Yohogania County. Ohio County encompassed most of the western region of the district bordering the Ohio River, including parts of what are now Washington and Greene Counties in Pennsylvania. Monongalia County encompassed much of what is now north-central West Virginia, and parts of what are now Washington, Greene and Fayette Counties in Pennsylvania. Yohogania County consisted of much of what is now southwestern Pennsylvania, including all of what is now Westmoreland County, Pennsylvania, parts of the present counties of Washington, Fayette, Allegheny, and Beaver, and the counties of Hancock County, West Virginia and the northern part of Brooke County, West Virginia.

In 1780, the boundary dispute between Virginia and Pennsylvania was finally settled when both sides agreed to extend the Mason-Dixon line westward from Maryland to 80° 31′ west, the current western border of Pennsylvania.

Most of Yohogania County became part of Pennsylvania; that section of its lands was divided between Westmoreland County and the newly formed Washington County in Pennsylvania; Beaver and Allegheny were later created from those counties. The relatively small part of Yohogania that remained in Virginia was subsumed into Ohio County. That area is now divided between Brooke County and Hancock County, Virginia (now West Virginia), which were later formed from Ohio County, at the northernmost tip of West Virginia's Northern Panhandle.

== See also ==
- Yohogania County, Virginia
- Site of Old Hannastown
- Westsylvania
