= Stephenson–Campbell House =

Historic house in Pennsylvania, United States

- U.S. National Register of Historic Places
- Washington County History & Landmarks Foundation Landmark
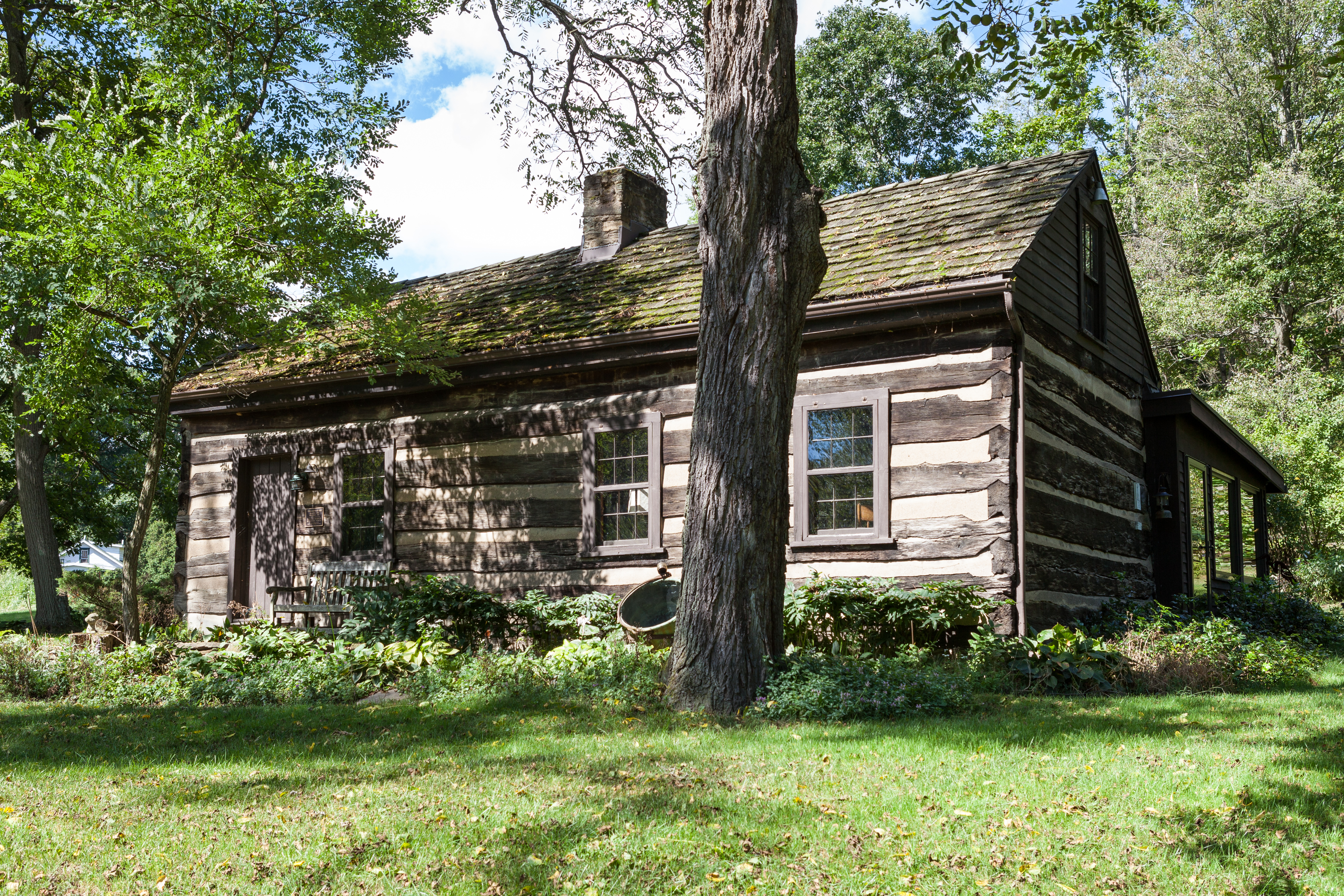
- The log house in September 2014

- Location within Pennsylvania Location within the United States
- Location: At the end of Tomahawk Claim Lne. off of Reissing Rd., Cecil, Pennsylvania
- Coordinates: 40°20′31″N 80°11′43″W
- Area: 22.9 acres (9.3 ha)
- Built: 1928
- NRHP reference No.: 02000891
- Added to NRHP: August 22, 2002

Stephenson–Campbell House, also known as the Stephenson–Campbell Property and the Stephenson Log House, is a historic site in Cecil, Pennsylvania containing four contributing buildings. Included are a 1778 log house, a 1929 Sears and Roebuck Company mail order bungalow style house, a 1929 spring house, and a 1928 garage. The log house is 16 feet by 34 feet, with several additions totaling about 1360 square feet. The log house is one of the few pre-1780 log houses still standing in Western Pennsylvania, and the only known example of a single story private home still extant in the area.

The property is also significant as one of the few examples of the conservation movement in Washington County, Pennsylvania. The restoration of the old log house starting in 1928, and a carefully planned garden design in 1929, are the only known example of a "back to nature" single family log house retreat established in the area in the 1920s.

The property on which the log house was built was owned by David Stephenson, who held Tomahawk rights until his claim was legitimized in 1786. The property passed through several owners until a portion, including the log house, was purchased by J. Sherman Campbell in 1928. The log cabin, which had fallen into disuse by the last quarter of the 19th century was restored and is still in use by the Campbell family.

The site is designated as a historic residential landmark/farmstead by the Washington County History & Landmarks Foundation, and is listed on the National Register of Historic Places.
