= Wyndham Grand Pittsburgh Downtown =

Hotel in Pittsburgh, Pennsylvania

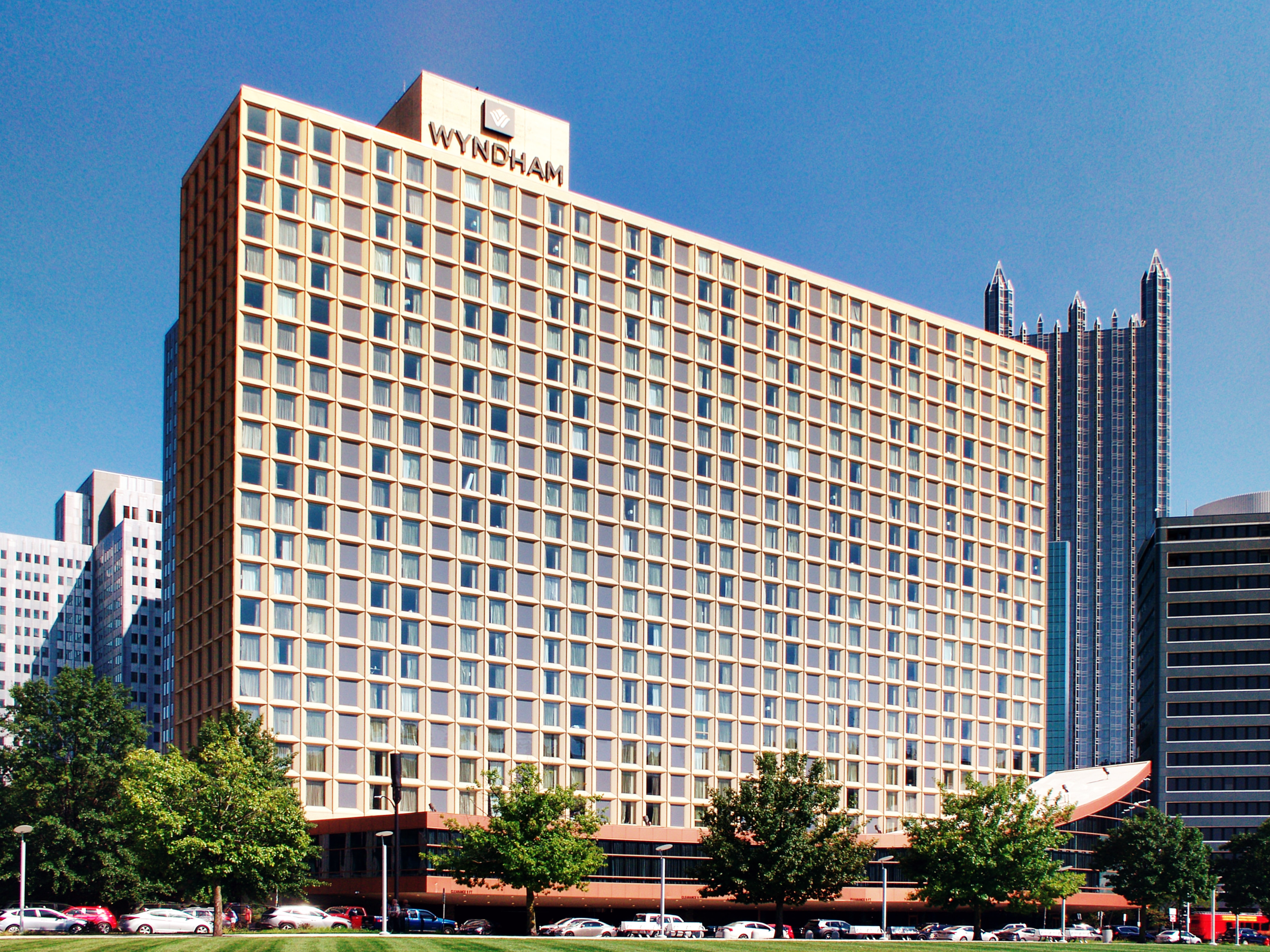
- Hotel chain: Wyndham Hotels & Resorts

General information
- Location: 600 Commonwealth Place, Pittsburgh, Pennsylvania 15222
- Opening: December 3, 1959
- Owner: Kiran Patel

Height
- Height: 333 feet (101 m)

Technical details
- Floor count: 25

Design and construction
- Architect: William B. Tabler
- Developer: Conrad Hilton

Other information
- Number of rooms: 712
- Number of restaurants: 1
- Hilton Pittsburgh
- U.S. Historic district – Contributing property
- Part of: Pittsburgh Renaissance Historic District (ID13000252)
- Added to NRHP: May 2, 2013

Wyndham Grand Pittsburgh Downtown (formerly the Hilton Pittsburgh) is a hotel in Downtown Pittsburgh, with a prominent position in the Golden Triangle area adjacent to Point State Park, the Fort Pitt Museum and the Cultural District. Hilton announced plans for the skyscraper hotel on June 11, 1956 and ground was broken for it on September 20, 1957 with Conrad Hilton himself in attendance. It was opened for business with a special gala on December 3, 1959 again attended by Mr. Hilton as well as Governor Lawrence. The hotel is the city's largest with 712 rooms and over 40,000 square feet (3,700 square metres) of conference facilities.

== History ==
The hotel was built on the site of Pittsburgh's original "King's Garden"—a vegetable garden for soldiers at nearby Fort Pitt. For over 50 years the hotel, along with the Mellon Arena and the William Penn Hotel, was one of the key destinations for any distinguished visitor to the region. Among the significant events that the hotel hosted have been:

- May 6–7, 1960: Presidential candidate Lyndon B. Johnson stays at the hotel and gives a major speech with mayor Joseph Barr in the ballroom, while on a two-day campaign tour of the region.
- November 4, 1960: President Dwight D. Eisenhower gives a major speech at the hotel.
- January 19, 1964: The Pro Football Hall of Fame meeting with Art Rooney, Pete Rozelle, Dick McCann, Gov. Lawrence, Justice White, George Halas and Vince Lombardi all visiting.
- April 24, 1964: President Lyndon B. Johnson attends a campaign rally to over 2,000 in the hotel's ballroom and speaks at a League of Women Voters conference at the hotel.
- June 8–12, 1969:
- October 6–7, 1970: Vice President Spiro Agnew gives a speech at the hotel and stays the night, amid 200 protestors clashing with police, 37 being arrested and a girl burning an American flag.
- October 26, 1976: President Gerald Ford addresses the Economic Club Conference at the hotel.
- April 1980: State AFL-CIO convention.
- September 4–5, 1980: George H. W. Bush gives several campaign speeches and stays the night, completing his address to the "World Affairs Council".
- July 16–18, 1981: The 58th annual International Brotherhood of Magicians Convention is held at the hotel.
- April 6, 1983: President Ronald Reagan delivers a major address at the "Conference of Dislocated Workers" in the ballroom.
- March 27, 1984: Vice President Walter Mondale speaks at the AFL-CIO state convention.
- June 29-July 6, 1986:
- April 18, 1996: Former President George H. W. Bush visits.
- August 5, 1996: The Democratic Party National Platform Convention is hosted by the hotel.
- August 5, 2002: President George W. Bush stays at the hotel as he meets with survivors of the Quecreek Mine Rescue, he also hosts a news conference as he signs the Born-Alive Infants Protection Act of 2002 into law in the ballroom.
- June 22–28, 2008: Airports Council International Annual Marketing Communications Conference.
- 1961-2006: The annual host of the region's Dapper Dan Sports Awards Banquet.

Hilton Hotels sold the hotel on May 22, 2006 to Shubh Hotels Pittsburgh LLC for $28 million.

== Bankruptcy and Changes ==
In the 2000s the hotel faced increasing competition and subsequent financial problems. A troubled $25 million expansion plan announced in 2007 later saw the construction workers walk off the job site before completion of the project. In 2010, Shubh Hotels fired the hotel management company, Crescent Hotels & Resorts, after a legal battle. Prism Hotels & Resorts replaced Crescent. In September 2010, Hilton Hotels & Resorts announced that they were terminating their franchise agreement with Shubh Hotels Pittsburgh LLC due to failed inspection grades. The hotel filed for Chapter 11 bankruptcy after the holder of its mortgage foreclosed. On November 23, 2010 the hotel officially became part of Wyndham Hotels, taking the name Wyndham Grand Pittsburgh Downtown. Kiran Patel took over ownership on April 7, 2011 after a series of lawsuits were resolved. Renovations were 'completed' in January 2014 at a cost of $15 million. The additional 20,000 square feet (1,900 square metres) added during the renovation includes three additional floors in the front of the hotel, a swimming pool, and increased conference facilities.

Preceded by Frick Building	Pittsburgh Skyscrapers by Height; 333 feet (101 m); 23 floors	Succeeded by Bell Telephone Building
Preceded by Regional Enterprise Tower	Pittsburgh Skyscrapers by Year of Completion; 1959	Succeeded by Four Gateway Center
