= United Steelworkers Building =

Office in Pittsburgh, Pennsylvania, US

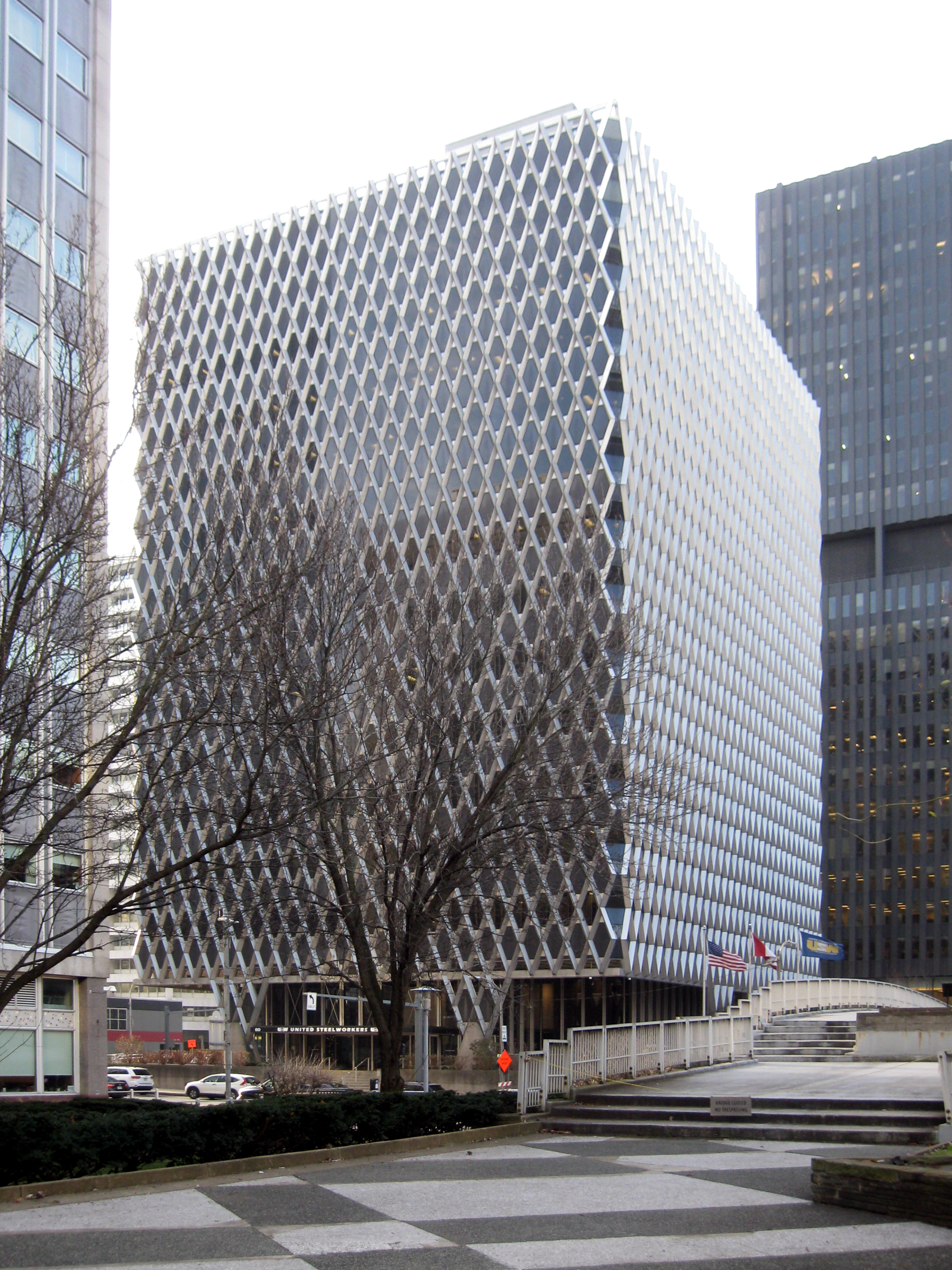
- The building in 2019
- Interactive map of the United Steelworkers Building area
- Former names: IBM Building
- Alternative names: I.W. Abel Building, Five Gateway Center

General information
- Type: Office
- Location: 60 Boulevard of the Allies, Pittsburgh, Pennsylvania, United States of America
- Coordinates: 40°26′22″N 80°00′20″W
- Groundbreaking: December 5, 1961
- Topped-out: November 8, 1962
- Opening: March 19, 1964
- Cost: $5 million
- Owner: United Steelworkers

Height
- Height: 172 feet (52 m) (estimated)

Technical details
- Floor count: 13

Design and construction
- Architect: Curtis and Davis
- Developer: Equitable Life Assurance Society
- Structural engineer: Worthington, Skilling, Helle & Jackson
- Main contractor: George A. Fuller Co.
- IBM Building
- U.S. Historic district – Contributing property
- Pittsburgh Landmark – PHLF
- Part of: Pittsburgh Renaissance Historic District (ID13000252)

Significant dates
- Designated CP: May 2, 2013
- Designated PHLF: 2014

The United Steelworkers Building, originally named the IBM Building and also known as the I.W. Abel Building or Five Gateway Center, is a highrise office building in Downtown Pittsburgh, Pennsylvania. It was built by the Equitable Life Assurance Society in 1961–64 as part of the Gateway Center project which redeveloped a large portion of the area known as the Point. The building is listed on the National Register of Historic Places as a contributing property in the Pittsburgh Renaissance Historic District and has been designated as a Pittsburgh landmark by the Pittsburgh History and Landmarks Foundation.

The building was designed by Curtis and Davis, a New Orleans–based architecture firm, with structural engineers Worthington, Skilling, Helle & Jackson. The design of the building, featuring a load-bearing steel diagrid exoskeleton, was highly unusual at the time and helped pioneer the use of diagrids and framed tube construction.

== History ==
The building was developed by the Equitable Life Assurance Society as part of the Gateway Center project, which transformed an area consisting primarily of old warehouses into a modernist office park. The IBM Building was built on the site of the former Wabash Terminal train shed, which had been demolished in 1953. Workers had to remove 104 large concrete piers from the former station during construction. Ground was broken on December 5, 1961 and the completed building was dedicated on March 19, 1964.

The building's original tenants were IBM, occupying floors 1–4, and U.S. Steel on floors 5–13. The building was purchased in 1973 by the United Steelworkers labor union, which has continued to own and occupy it since. In 1989 it was officially renamed for former USW president I.W. Abel.

== Architecture ==
The design of the IBM Building was highly unusual at the time of construction in that the exterior of the building is load-bearing, unlike conventional high-rise architecture which used post-and-beam type steel or concrete framing with exterior curtain walls. The IBM building is supported by a steel exoskeleton resting on eight piers, two on each side of the building, along with a central core containing elevators and other utilities. The remainder of the interior is free from structural supports, allowing a completely open floorplan. This was one of the earliest examples of "framed tube" construction, which was later used extensively to build supertall structures like the John Hancock Center and World Trade Center. In fact, the structural engineers for the IBM Building, John Skilling and Leslie E. Robertson, were also responsible for the World Trade Center. The Pittsburgh Post-Gazette called the IBM Building "one of the first real changes from conventional design in half a century of multi-story building."

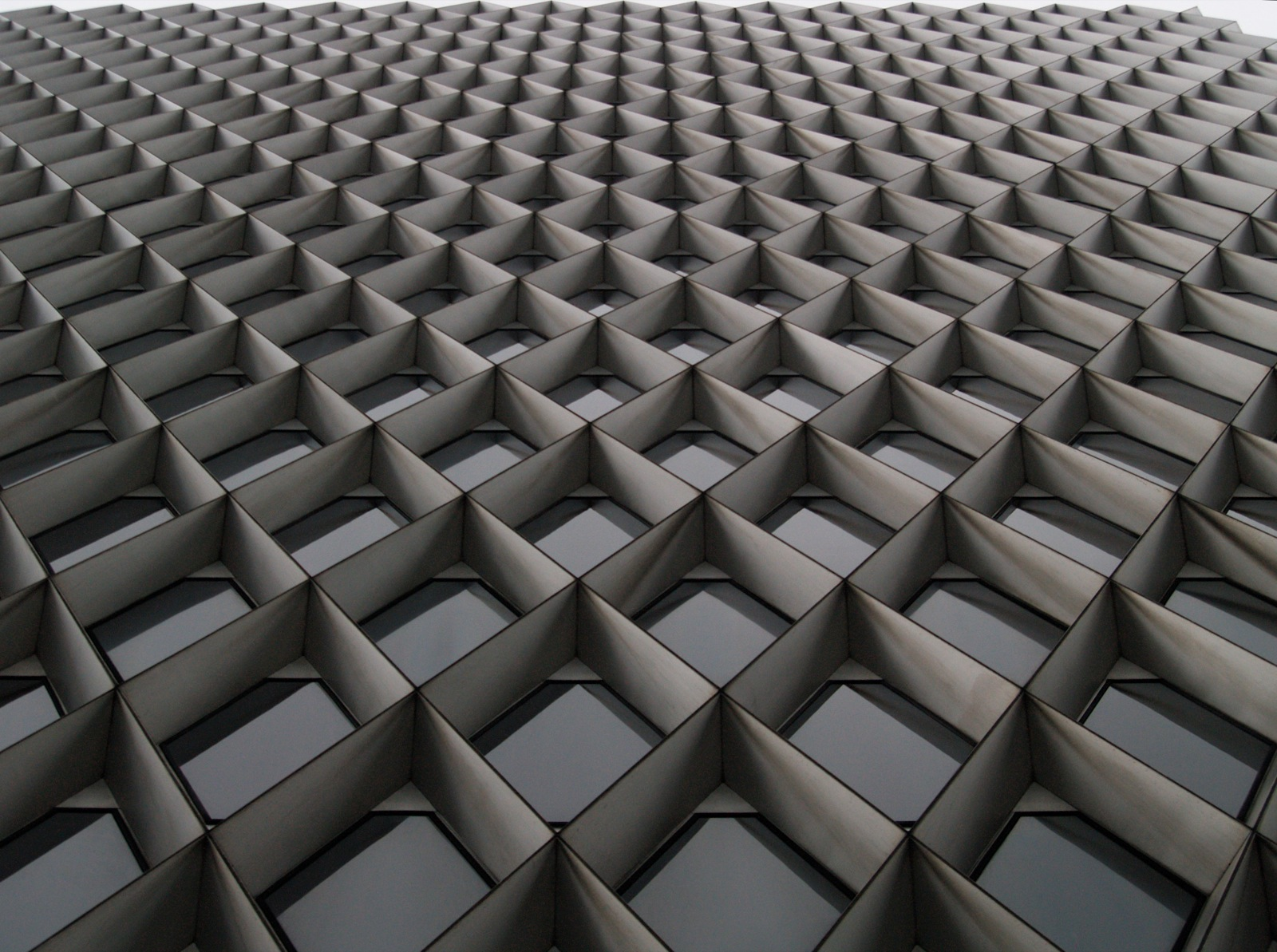
Detail of the building exterior

The building was also one of the first to utilize a diagrid (diagonal grid) structure, which requires less steel than a conventional frame. The building frame does not contain any vertical members except for the six columns that support the utility core. This type of structure was difficult to build at the time, though construction advances have since made it possible to build much larger diagrid buildings like 30 St Mary Axe. The IBM Building diagrid structure is constructed from 252 prefabricated sections which were hoisted into place and welded together. The exterior of the building is covered with a skin of stainless steel and glass panels in alternating rows.

Another unusual feature of the building is that the frame is constructed from different grades of steel depending on the strength requirements of each structural member. This was a departure from conventional structural engineering, where the material would typically be chosen at the outset. Instead, the engineers devised the frame geometry first and then calculated the required yield strength for each member, refining the design iteratively. The steel used in the building was supplied by U.S. Steel and varied from plain carbon steel with a yield strength of 36 ksi (250 MPa) to high-strength alloy with a yield strength of 100 ksi (690 MPa). The steel beams were color-coded during construction to ensure the frame was assembled correctly.
