= Bell Telephone Company of Pennsylvania Western Headquarters Building =

- U.S. National Register of Historic Places
- U.S. Historic district – Contributing property
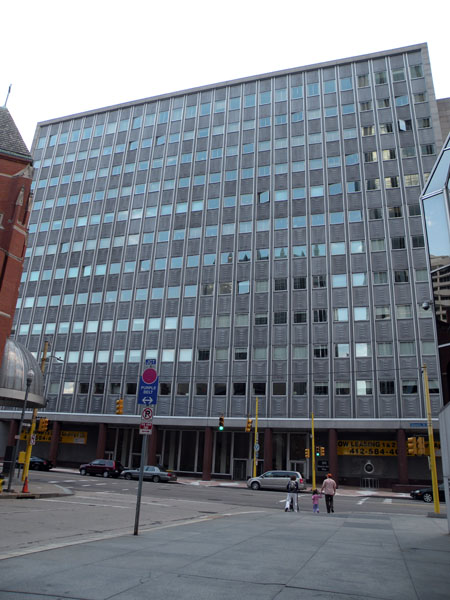

- Location within Pittsburgh Location within Pennsylvania Location within the United States
- Location: 201 Stanwix Street, Pittsburgh, Pennsylvania
- Coordinates: 40°26′24.62″N 80°0′18.35″W
- Area: 1.4 acres (0.57 ha)
- Built: 1956 and 1957
- Architect: Press C. Dowler
- Architectural style: Modern
- Part of: Pittsburgh Renaissance Historic District (ID13000252)
- NRHP reference No.: 11000921

Significant dates
- Added to NRHP: December 15, 2011
- Designated CP: May 2, 2013

The Bell Telephone Company of Pennsylvania Western Headquarters Building (also known as the Verizon Building) is a structure at 201 Stanwix Street in downtown Pittsburgh, Pennsylvania. The 12-story building, which was built between 1956 and 1957. In 1985 it was utilized for office space, corporate television & fiber optic teleconferencing facilities for intra-organization, face-to-face meetings. An historic #5ESS cutover in 1986 was covered by the news crew here marking the entrance into the digital age of telecommunications for an antiquated landline infrastructure in the United States. Converted to luxury rental apartments in 2012. It was listed on the National Register of Historic Places on December 15, 2011.
