= River Vue =

Apartments at River View
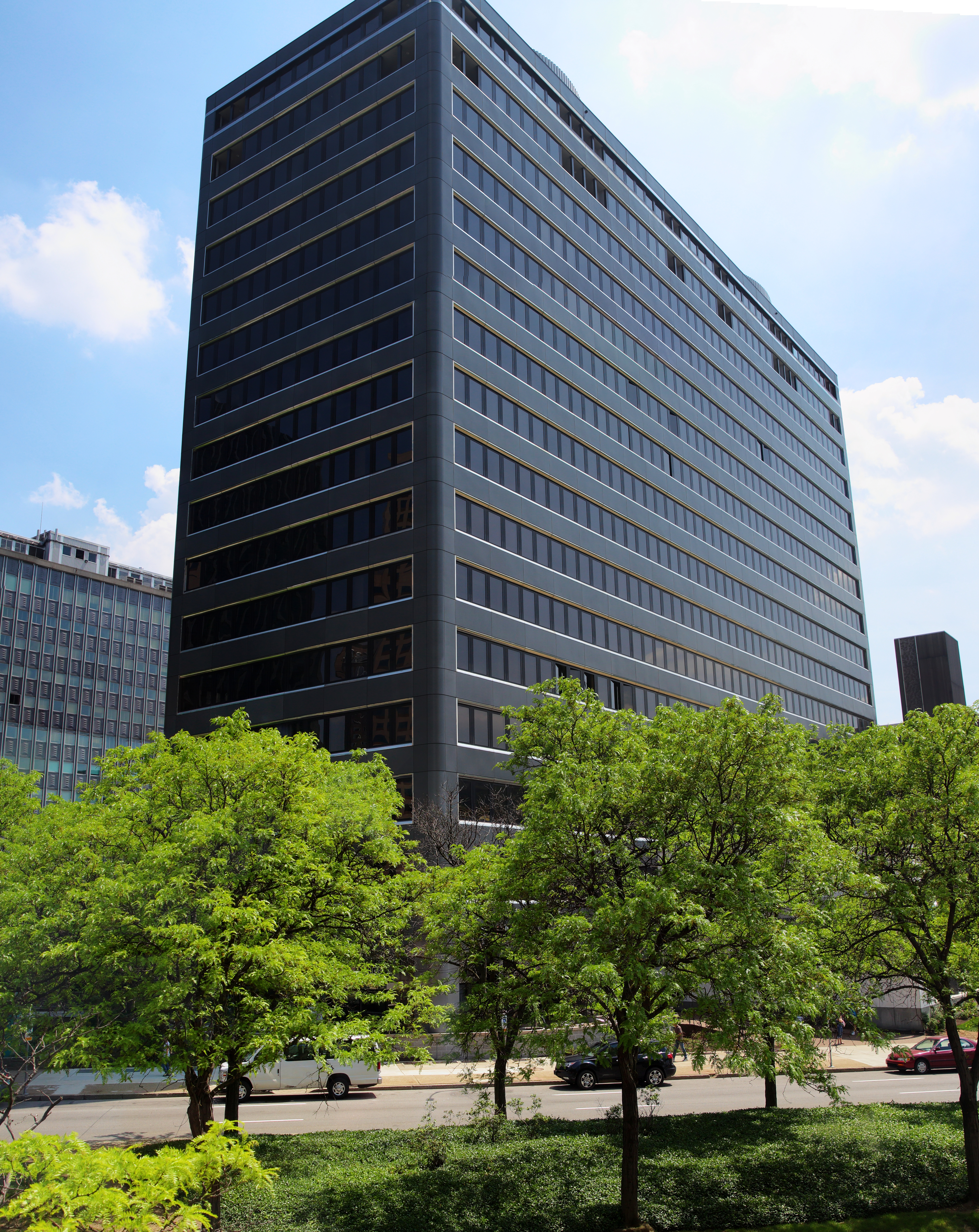
- River View building, viewed from the North, May 2013.

- Location within Pittsburgh
- Former names: Pittsburgh State Office Building (1957-2010)

General information
- Type: Residential building
- Location: Downtown Pittsburgh, 300 Liberty Avenue; Pittsburgh, Pennsylvania
- Coordinates: 40°26′26.4″N 80°0′22.1″W
- Completed: April 26, 1957
- Renovated: 2010
- Renovation cost: $45 million (2010-2012)
- Owner: Commonwealth of Pennsylvania (1957-2010); Millcraft Industries, Inc. (2010-2022); Berger Communities(2022-Present)

Technical details
- Floor count: 16-story

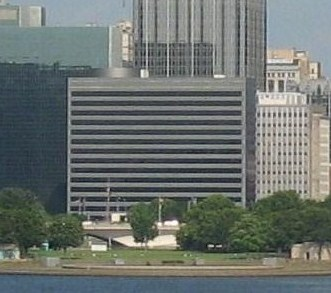
The former Pittsburgh State Office Building, as viewed in 2010 from the West End Bridge

Apartments at River View is a 16-story apartment building in Downtown Pittsburgh, featuring panoramic views of Point State Park and the confluence of the city's three rivers. The facility has 218 luxury apartments, with 2012 monthly rent reaching $5,500 in the top floors. The newly remodeled building, rechristened Apartments at River View, opened for residents in May 2012. The building was cited by the Wall Street Journal as an example of the renewed livability of Pittsburgh.

The building was originally the Pittsburgh State Office Building, a state-owned office building housing governmental offices. In March 2009, the Commonwealth of Pennsylvania sold the office building to Millcraft Industries of Washington, Pennsylvania. The sale was criticized by Pennsylvania State Auditor General Jack Wagner, who noted that the $4.6 million sale price was half its appraised value. He said that the plan would cost the taxpayers nearly $55 million in leases to move state workers to other buildings. The replacement located include 11 Stanwix Street, 411 Seventh Avenue (the Chamber of Commerce Building), 301 Fifth Avenue (Piatt Place). James Creedon, the secretary of the Pennsylvania Department of General Services, who managed the sale, said that the state saved $14 million by selling the building rather than renovating it.
