= Fort Pitt Museum =

American museum

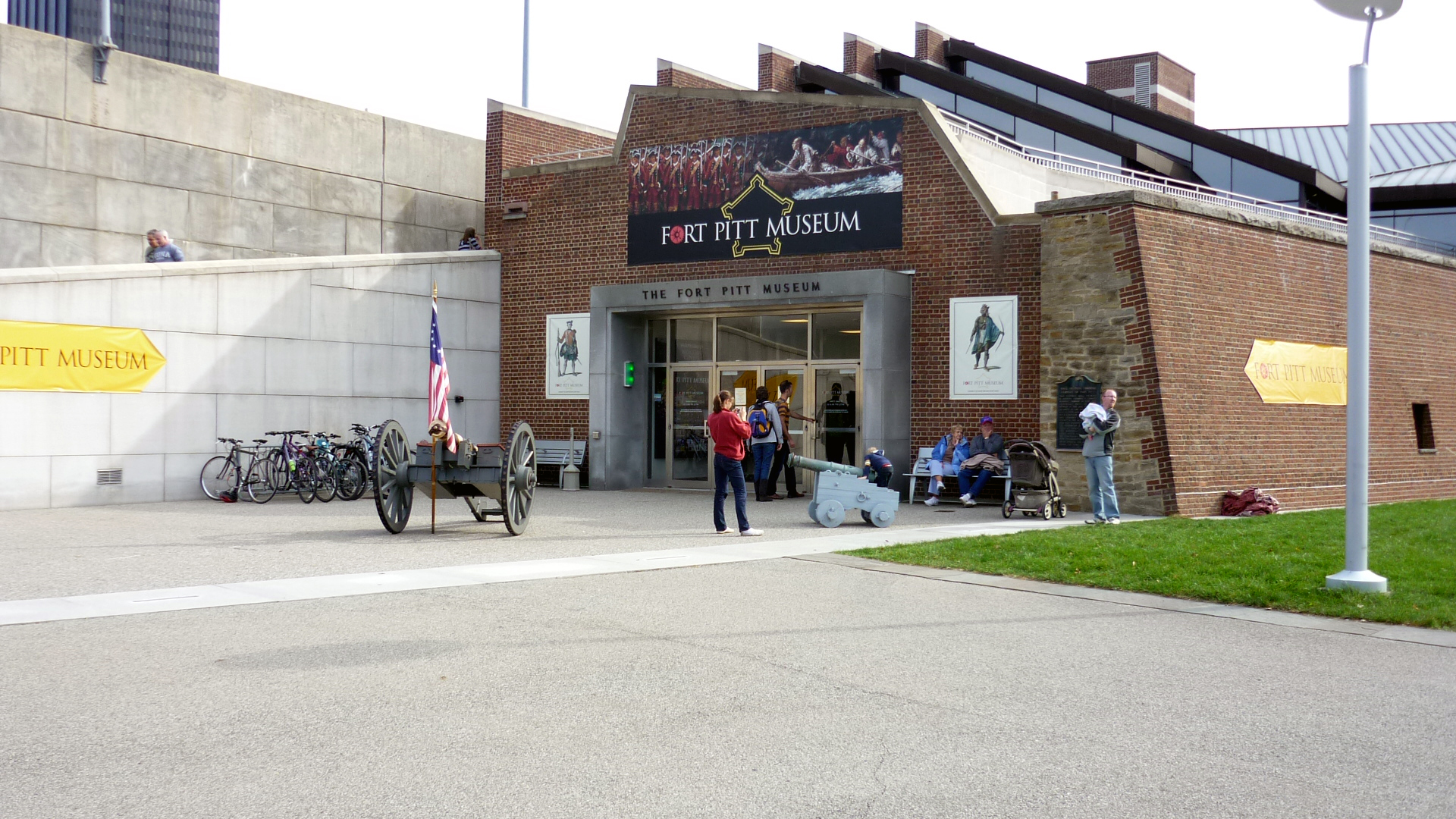
- Museum exterior in 2014

- Location within Pennsylvania
- Established: 1969
- Location: Pittsburgh, Allegheny County, Pennsylvania, United States
- Coordinates: 40.44064°N 80.00957°W
- Curator: Heinz History Center / Pennsylvania Historical and Museum Commission
- Fort Pitt Museum
- U.S. Historic district – Contributing property
- Part of: Pittsburgh Renaissance Historic District (ID13000252)
- Designated CP: May 2, 2013

Fort Pitt Museum is an indoor/outdoor museum that is administered by the Senator John Heinz History Center in downtown Pittsburgh, Allegheny County, Pennsylvania in the United States. It is at the confluence of the Monongahela and Allegheny Rivers, where the Ohio River is formed. Fort Pitt Museum is surrounded by Point State Park, a Pennsylvania state park named for the geographically and historically significant point that is between the rivers. This piece of land was key to controlling the upper reaches of the Ohio River Valley and western Pennsylvania, before, during and after the French and Indian War as well as the American Revolution.

The museum is in a recreated bastion of Fort Pitt, which was originally built in 1758 by the British. An outline of Fort Duquesne is nearby. The historical focus of the museum is the role that Fort Pitt played during the French and Indian War. The museum also features detailed information on Fort Pitt's role during the American Revolution, the Whiskey Rebellion and the founding of Pittsburgh. The museum was established and operated by the Pennsylvania Historical and Museum Commission until its closure in August 2009 from state budget cuts. The Heinz Center took over the operation of the museum and reopened it in April 2010.

== History ==
Fort Pitt was a fort in what is now the city of Pittsburgh, Allegheny County, Pennsylvania. The fort was built in 1758 during the French and Indian War, next to the site of Fort Duquesne. The French built Fort Duquesne at the beginning of that war, and it became a focal point due to its strategic river location. The Braddock expedition, a 1755 attempt to take Fort Duquesne, met with a bloody repulse at the Monongahela River. The French garrison viciously mauled an attacking British regiment in September 1758, but abandoned and destroyed the fort at the approach of General John Forbes's expedition in November.

The Forbes expedition was successful where the Braddock expedition had failed because of the Treaty of Easton, in which area American Indians agreed to abandon their alliance with the French. American Indians— primarily Delawares and Shawnees— made this agreement with the understanding that the British military would leave the area after the war. The Indians wanted a trading post on the spot, but they did not want a British army garrison. The British, however, built a new fort on the site and named it Fort Pitt, after William Pitt the Elder.

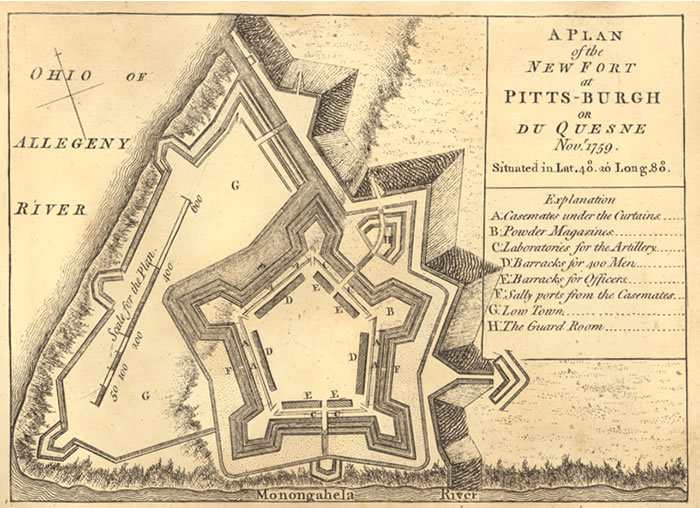
"A Plan of the New Fort at Pitts-Burgh", drawn by cartographer John Rocque and published in 1765.

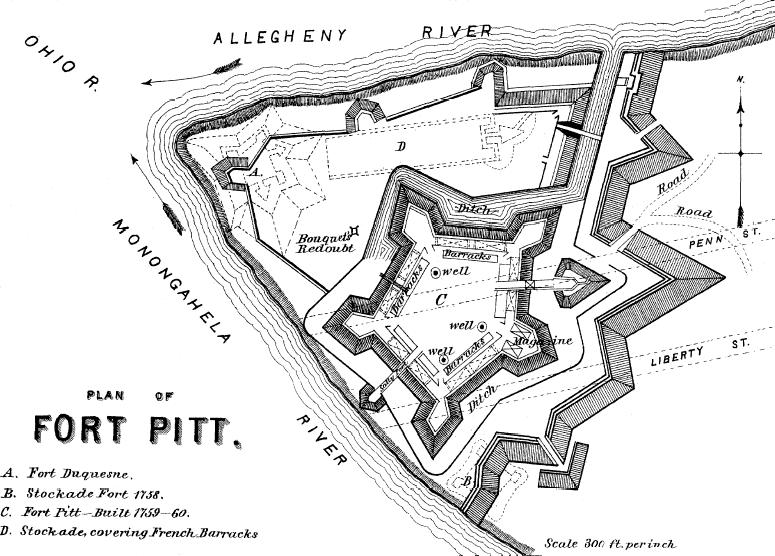
"Fort Pitt in 1795", from Durant's 1876 "History of Allegheny County"

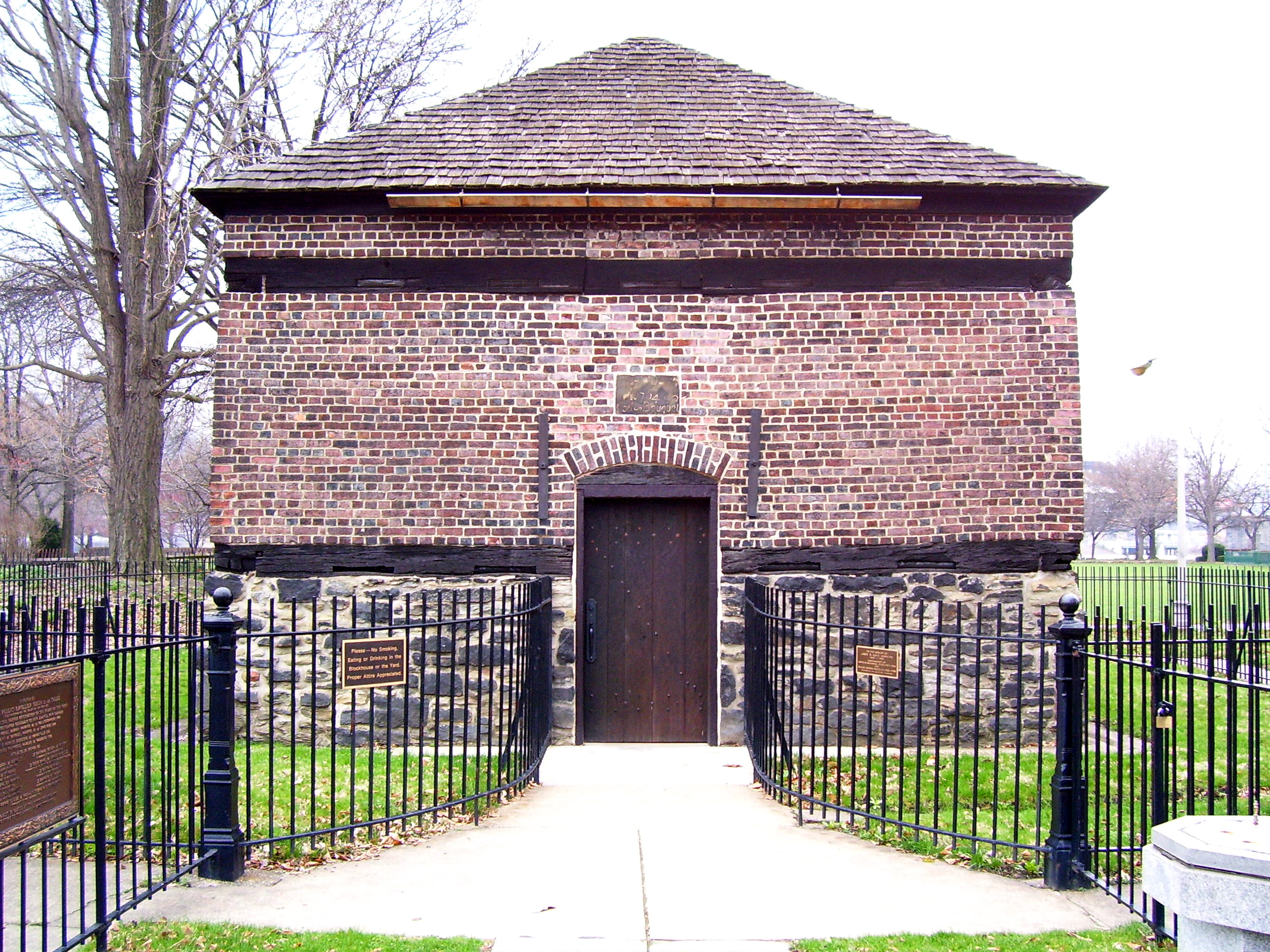
The Blockhouse.

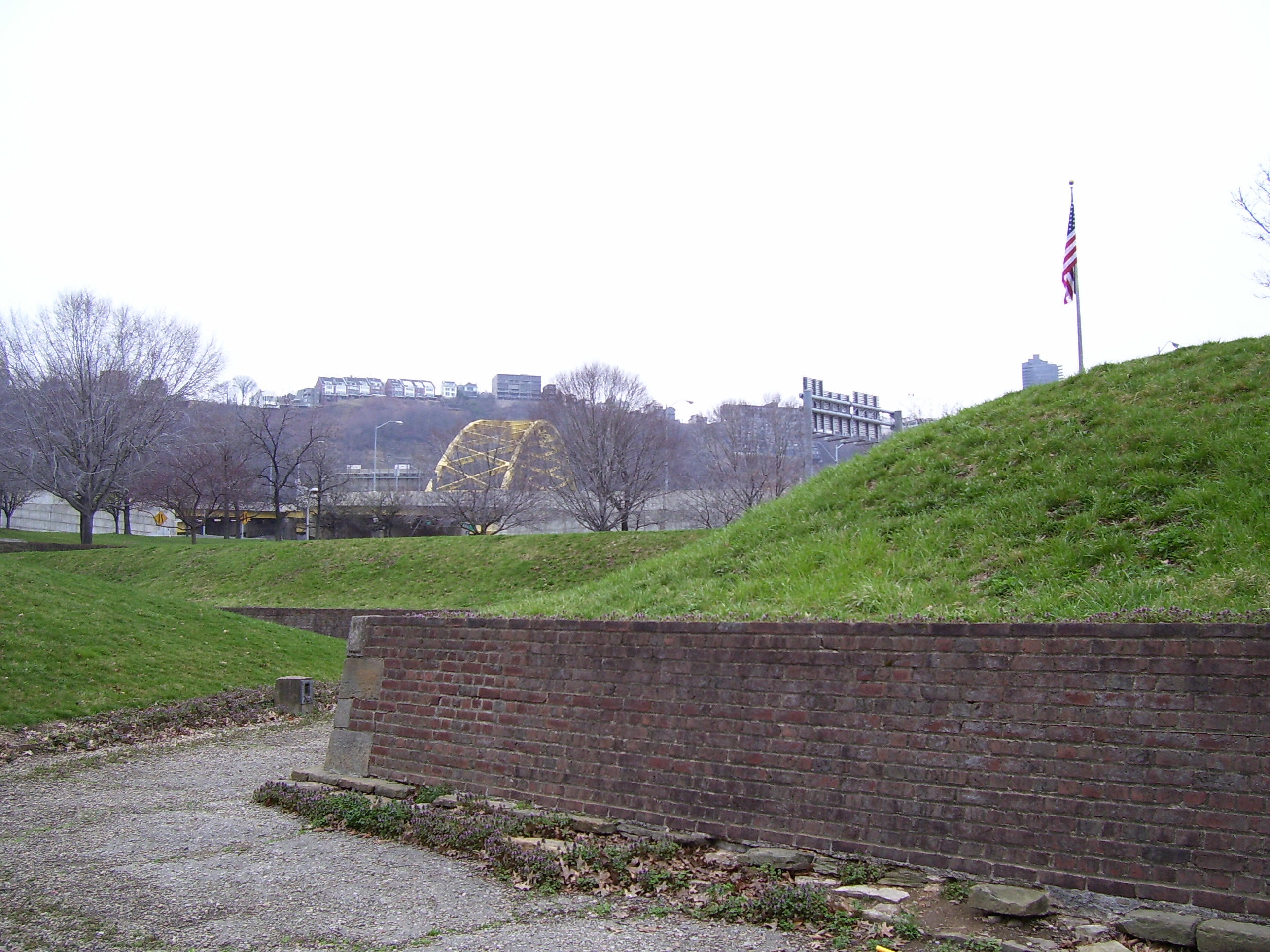
Part of the excavated fort.

As a result, in 1763 local Delawares and Shawnees took part in Pontiac's Rebellion, an effort to drive the British out of their territory. The Indians' siege of Fort Pitt began on June 22, 1763, but the fort was too strong to be taken by force. In negotiations during the siege, the commander of Fort Pitt gave two Delaware emissaries blankets that had been exposed to smallpox, in hopes of infecting the surrounding Indians and ending the siege. The effectiveness of this attempt is unclear. Outbreaks of smallpox had plagued Native Americans for years before, during and after the Fort Pitt attempt, killing much of the Native American population. On August 1, 1763, most of the Indians broke off the siege in order to intercept an approaching force under Colonel Henry Bouquet, resulting in the Battle of Bushy Run. Bouquet fought off the attack and relieved Fort Pitt on August 10.

After Pontiac's War, Fort Pitt was no longer necessary to the British Crown and was abandoned to the locals in 1772. At that time, the Pittsburgh area was claimed by both Virginia and Pennsylvania, and a power struggle for the region commenced. Virginians took control of Fort Pitt, and for a brief while in the 1770s it was called Fort Dunmore, in honour of Virginia's Governor Lord Dunmore. The fort served as a staging ground in Dunmore's War of 1774.

During the American Revolutionary War, Fort Pitt served as a headquarters for the western theatre of the war. Fort Pitt fell into disrepair once again in the years following the Revolution. It was abandoned in 1792 when Fort Fayette was built to replace it. Residents of the growing Pittsburgh used the remnants of the fort to build permanent housing for themselves.

A small brick building called the Blockhouse—actually a type of outbuilding known as a redoubt—remains in Point State Park, the only intact remnant of Fort Pitt. It was erected in 1764 and is believed to be the oldest building, not only in Pittsburgh but in western Pennsylvania. Used for many years as a home, the blockhouse was purchased and has been preserved for many years by the Daughters of the American Revolution, who make it open to the public. Part of the foundations of Fort Pitt have been excavated and some of the fort has been rebuilt, though, giving visitors to Point State Park a sense of the size of the fort. In this rebuilt section the Monongahela Bastion houses the Fort Pitt Museum.

Fort Pitt Foundry was an important armaments manufacturing centre for the Federal government during the Civil War, under the charge of William Metcalf.

== Museum ==
Michael DeBerardinis, Secretary of the Pennsylvania Department of Conservation and Natural Resources, announced a $25 million plan to renovate Point State Park and parts of the Fort Pitt Museum on October 11, 2006. The plans call for improving the green spaces within the park, expanding recreational opportunities, preserving historical installations and updating outdated amenities. The project was originally scheduled to be complete within four years, with the majority of the work to be completed in time for Pittsburgh's 250th-anniversary celebration in 2008.

Sections of the park have fallen into disuse since it was established in 1974. The homeless have used the trenches surrounding the foundations of the remains of Fort Pitt as a temporary shelter for years. Graffiti on the structures of the park has become a major problem. Sections of the park are littered with fence posts, cut logs, plastic drums, and rolled up snow drift fencing. The walkways have become cracked and are beginning to fall apart. The goal of the restoration project is to re-establish the park as a recreational destination.

Plans for improving the park are well underway. They include installing new pumps and pipes in the fountain, establishing a seating area around the fountain and a wading area for children, restoring the river walk with steps that lead into the river, building kiosks for information and concessions, renovating the restrooms, renovating the water taxi landings and surrounding docks, and installing wireless internet access hubs. Currently (April 2011) the waterfront area is closed to pedestrians as the stone walkways and wharf area are being resurfaced. They are to be reopened during the summer, 2011.

These plans were not put into place without some controversy. On January 25, 2007, thirteen members of two different locals labour unions were arrested for blocking access by contractors to the work sites at the remnants of Fort Pitt. The labour union protested the use of four non-labour workers by the contractor responsible for completing the work at Point State Park.

On August 14, 2009, the state closed the museum and three other PHMC museums indefinitely due to a lack of funding as part of an ongoing budget crisis. Management of the museum is supposed to be taken over by Senator John Heinz Regional History Center once the state budget is passed. The Senator John Heinz History Center reopened the Fort Pitt Museum on Saturday, April 17, 2010. The History Center's museum system also includes a Smithsonian-affiliated, seven-story museum in Pittsburgh's Strip District; Meadowcroft Rockshelter and Historic Village, the oldest site of human habitation in North America located in Avella, Pa.; and the Western Pennsylvania Sports Museum, a two-floor museum-within-a-museum at the History Center.

Currently, the Fort Pitt Museum is open to visitation seven days a week from 10 a.m. – 5 p.m. The museum is closed only on major holidays (Christmas, New Years, Thanksgiving and Easter)
