= Washington County History & Landmarks Foundation =

US non-profit educational institution

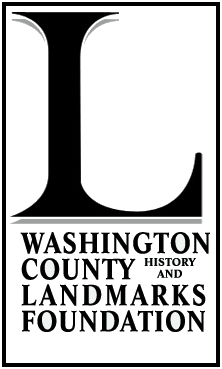
- Formation: 1973
- Type: Non-profit
- Purpose: Encourage the preservation of buildings, landmarks and structures in Washington County, Pennsylvania
- Location: Washington, Pennsylvania, U.S.
- Region served: Washington County, Pennsylvania

Washington County History & Landmarks Foundation is a non-profit educational institution in Washington, Pennsylvania, United States. Its purpose is to encourage and assist the preservation of historic structures in Washington County, Pennsylvania. The foundation operates its own landmark certification process, as well as working with the National Park Service to document and place landmarks on the National Register of Historic Places. It also offers advice and assistance for historic building owners who wish to preserve their facilities. Since its inception, the foundation has been successful in helping many historic building owners in the preservation of their structures.

For a number of years, the foundation has been in conflict with Washington & Jefferson College. In 1968, the college's campus master plan called for the expansion of the campus eastward towards Wade Avenue in East Washington Borough, a plan that placed them in conflict with the residents of that area. For the next 30 years, the college maintained a policy of purchasing any homes in that area as they became available. In response, the Washington County History and Landmarks Foundation was able to get the East Washington Historic District, a collection of 120 Victorian homes in that area, added to the National Register of Historic Places in 1984. The college opposed the designation but did not object in time to prevent it. According to College President Howard J. Burnett, the district "was structured to prevent expansion of the college."

In the 1990s, the hard feelings between some residents and the college came to a head, with residents trying to have the Borough enact anti-demolition laws to block expansion and a meeting of the Washington County History and Landmarks Foundation deteriorated into a shouting match between residents and college officials. Burnett maintained that the expansion was beneficial to the community and that the opposition came from a small and non-representative group on Wade Avenue. He also questioned the historic value of many of the designated homes, pointing out that many of them were in very poor shape and others were vacant. As of 1995, the college owned about 30 properties listed in the historic district. In the end, efforts to block the demolition of these buildings, including several which were part of the historic district, were unsuccessful. Notably, one 140-year-old farm house at 137 South Wade Street, which the college had acquired in 1977 after being vacant for several years, was moved to a new location outside of town.

In 2009, the foundation sponsored an architectural survey of buildings in the African American areas of Washington.

== Bridges ==
| Landmark name | Image | Architect/builder/ engineer/decorator | Address | Location | Status |
| Bailey Covered Bridge | | | Spans Ten Mile Creek | Amity | Destroyed by fire in 1994; reconstructed |
| Scott Brownlee Covered Bridge | | | TR 414 over Templeton Fork of Wheeling Creek | East Finley Township | |
| Brownsville Bridge | | | LR 268 Over Monongahela River, between West Brownsville in Washington County and Brownsville in Fayette County | West Brownsville | |
| Charleroi-Monessen Bridge | | | LR 247 over Monongahela River, between Charleroi in Washington County and Monessen in Westmoreland County | Charleroi | |
| Crawford Covered Bridge | | | TR 307, spanning Robinson Fork of Wheeling Creek | West Finley Township | |
| Danley Covered Bridge | | | On TR 379, spanning Robinson Fork of Wheeling Creek | West Finley Township | |
| Horn Davis Overholtzer Bridge | | | TR 838 over Ten Mile Creek | West Bethlehem Township | Collapsed on March 20, 1994 |
| Day Covered Bridge | | | On TR 339 over Short Creek, Prosperity | Morris Township | |
| Ebenezer Covered Bridge | | | In Mingo Creek Park, spanning Mingo Creek | Nottingham Township | |
| Erskine Covered Bridge | | | TR 314 over Middle Wheeling Creek | West Finley Township | |
| Henry Covered Bridge | | | Spans Mingo Creek in Mingo Creek County Park | Nottingham Township | |
| Jackson's Mill Covered Bridge | | | Northwest of Burgettstown on TR 853 crossing King's Creek | Hanover Township | |
| Krepps Covered Bridge | | | Southeast of Cherry Valley on TR 799 over Raccoon Creek | Mount Pleasant Township | |
| Letherman Covered Bridge | | | On TR 449 spanning the South Branch of Pigeon Creek | North Bethlehem Township | |
| Longdon L. Miller Covered Bridge | | | TR 414 over Templeton Fork of Wheeling Creek | West Finley Township | |
| Lyle Covered Bridge | | | North of Raccoon on TR 861 crossing Raccoon Creek | Hanover Township | |
| Martin's Mill Covered Bridge | | | West of Marianna, crossing Ten Mile Creek | West Bethlehem Township | Disappeared |
| Blaney Mays Covered Bridge | | | TR 423, spanning Middle Wheeling Creek | Donegal Township | |
| Devil's Den, McClurg Covered Bridge | | | Hanover Park | Hanover Township | |
| Pine Bank Covered Bridge | | | Near SR 4018 at Meadowcroft Village, Avella | Cross Creek Township | |
| Plant's Covered Bridge | | | TR 408 over Templeton Fork of Wheeling Creek | East Finley Township | |
| Ralston Freeman Covered Bridge | | | on private property, TR 352 over Aunt Clara's Fork of Kings Creek | Hanover Township | |
| Claysville S Bridge | | | 6 miles west of Washington on Old National Road (US 40), over Buffalo Creek | Buffalo Township | |
| Sawhill Covered Bridge | | | TR 426 over Buffalo Creek, SR 221 Taylorstown | Blaine Township | |
| Sprowl's Covered Bridge | | | TR 450 over Rocky Run | West Finley Township | |
| Webster-Donora Bridge | | | SR 143 over the Monongahela River | Donora | |
| Wilson's Mill Covered Bridge | | | Cross Creek County Park | Cross Creek Township | |
| Cerl Wright Covered Bridge | | | TR 802 over the North Branch of Pigeon Creek | Somerset Township | |
| Wyit Sprowls Covered Bridge | | | TR 360 over Robinson Fork of Wheeling Creek | West Finley Township | |

== Historic districts ==
| District name | Image | Location | Municipality |
| Beallsville Historic District | | National Road, from Oak Alley to West Alley and Sunset Drive to Sargent Alley | Beallsville Borough |
| Cement City Historic District | | Chestnut and Walnut Streets from Modisette to Bertha Avenue and along Ida and Bertha Streets | Donora Borough |
| Centerville Historic District | | Old National Pike spur, roughly from Linton Road to the junction of US 40 and PA 481 | Centerville |
| East Washington Historic District | | Intersected by Beau Street and Wade Avenue, includes North Avenue, Wheeling and Chestnut Streets | East Washington, Pennsylvania |
| Marianna Historic District | | Roughly bounded by Ten Mile Creek, Beeson Avenue Hill, 6th and 7th Streets | Marianna, Pennsylvania |
| Scenery Hill Historic District | | National Road East (US 40), between Scenery Hill Cemetery and Kinder Road | North Bethlehem Township |
| Taylorstown Historic District | | Main Street, Taylorstown | Blaine Township |
| West Alexander Historic District | | Main Street, North Liberty to Mechanic Streets | West Alexander |
| West Middletown Historic District | | Main Street (Route 844) running east–west | West Middleton |

== Public landmarks ==
| Landmark name | Image | Location | Municipality | Status |
| McMillan Hall | | Campus of Washington and Jefferson College | Washington | |
| Bethel African American Episcopal Church of Monongahela City | | 7th and West Main Streets | Monongahela | |
| David Bradford House | | 175 South Main Street | Washington | |
| Canonsburg Armory | | West College Street and North Central Avenue | Canonsburg | |
| Hawthorne School | | Hawthorne and Bluff Streets | Canonsburg | |
| Hill's Tavern | | US 40, Scenery Hill | North Bethlehem Township | |
| LeMoyne Crematory | | South Main Street at Hillsview Sanitarium | North Franklin Township | |
| F. Julius LeMoyne House | | 49 East Maiden Street | Washington | |
| Meadowcroft Rock Shelter | | 401 Meadowcroft Road, west of Avella | Cross Creek Township | |
| Mingo Creek Presbyterian Church and Churchyard | | Junction of SR 88 and Mingo Church Road | Union Township | |
| Old Main, California State College | | Campus of California University of Pennsylvania | California | |
| Pennsylvania Railroad Freight Station | | 111 Washington Street | Washington | |
| Pennsylvania Railroad Passenger Station | | Water and Wood Streets | California | |
| Trinity Hall | | On SR 18,1 mile south of Washington | Washington | |
| United States Post Office-Charleroi | | 638 Fallowfield Avenue | Charleroi | |
| Washington Armory | | 76 West Maiden Street | Washington | |
| Washington County Courthouse | | South Main Street between Beau Street and Cherry Street | Washington | |
| Washington County Jail | | Cherry Street, west of courthouse | Washington | |

== Residential landmarks and farmsteads ==
| Property name | Image | Location | Municipality |
| Edward G. Acheson House | | 908 Main Street, Monongahela | Monongahela |
| Samuel Brownlee House | | SR 519 in village of Wylandville | South Strabane Township |
| Caldwell Tavern | | Junction of US 40 and TR 474 east of Claysville | Buffalo Township |
| Dager-Wonsettler Farmstead | | On Old National Road (now SR 40) near Glyde | Amwell Township |
| Margaret Derrow House | | West Main Street, Claysville | Donegal Township |
| Doak-Little House | | US 40 | South Strabane Township |
| Joseph Dorsey House | | 113 Cherry Avenue, Denbeau Heights (Denbo Heights) | Centerville Borough |
| Dusmal House | | East of Gastonville off Gilmore Road | Union Township |
| Molly Fleming House | | 616 Wood Street | California |
| Philip Friend House | | 105 Little Daniels Run Road | North Bethlehem Township |
| Harrison House | | Old National Pike, US 40, one mile east of Centerville | Centerville Borough |
| Huffman Distillery and Chopping Mill | | LR 62155, 2 miles North of Junction with PA 917 | Somerset Township |
| Jennings-Gallagher House | | Wood Street, California | California |
| Kinder's Mill | | LR 62194 at Piper Road, Deemston | Deemston |
| Moses Little Tavern | | National Pike (US 40), 3/4 miles east of I-79 interchange | Amwell Township |
| David Longwell House | | West Main Street, Monongahela City | Monongahela |
| Malden Inn | | Off US 40 East, on Malden Place, spur of Old National Road | Centerville Borough |
| Isaac Manchester House | | 2 miles south of Avella on SR 231 | Independence Township |
| Martin Farmstead | | SR 136, 2 miles west of Eighty Four | South Strabane Township |
| Dr. Joseph Maurer House | | 97 West Wheeling Street | Washington |
| Montgomery House | | West Main Street, Claysville | Donegal Township |
| Thomas Munce House | | SR 136, 3 miles east of Washington | South Strabane Township |
| John H. Nelson House | | 104 Colvin Road | Fallowfield Township |
| Robert Parkinson Farm | | SR 18, .4 miles north of Old Concord Village | Morris Township |
| Regester Log House | | | Deemston |
| Ringland Tavern | | On US 40 (Old National Road), Scenery Hill | North Bethlehem Township |
| Roberts House | | 225 North Central Avenue | Canonsburg |
| Frank L. Ross Farm | | SR 519, .3 miles north of US 40 | North Bethlehem Township |
| Sackville House | | 309 East Wheeling Street | Washington |
| Stephenson-Campbell House | | On Tomahawk Claim Lane, off Reissing Road | Cecil Township |
| James Thome Farm | | 213 Linnwood Road | North Strabane Township |
| Ulery Mill | | LR 62078, in Zollarsville | West Bethlehem Township |
| Welsh-Emery House | | 114 Emery Road, a spur of the Old National Road | Centerville Borough |
| John White House | | 2151 North Main Street Ext. | Chartiers Township |
| Levi Wilson Tavern | | On National Road (US 40), 1.5 miles east of S-Bridge | Buffalo Township |

== See also ==
- National Register of Historic Places listings in Washington County, Pennsylvania
- List of Pennsylvania state historical markers in Washington County
