= East Finley Township, Washington County, Pennsylvania =

Township in Pennsylvania, US

Coordinates: 39°59′54″N 80°21′59″W

East Finley Township
- Township
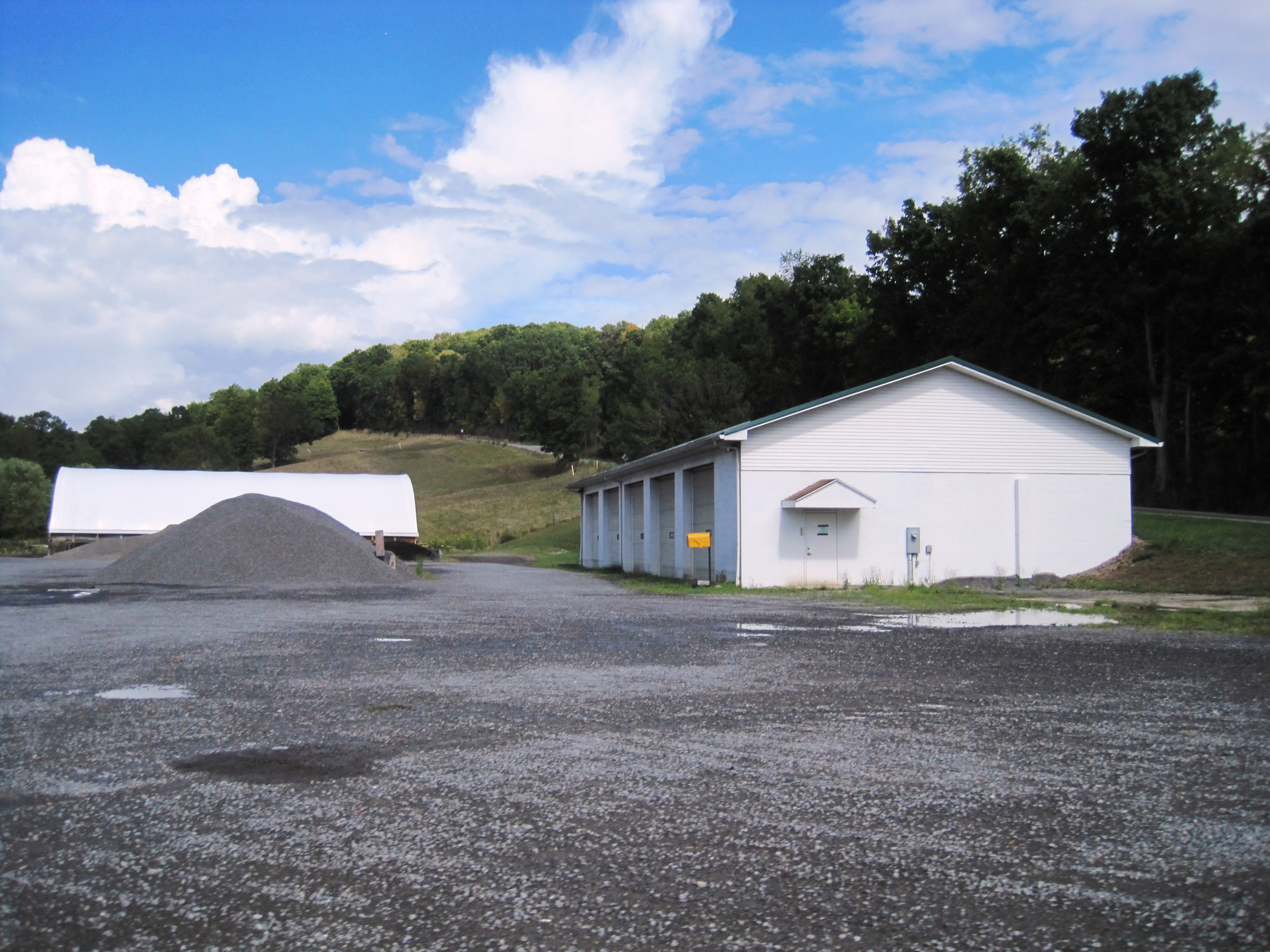
- Municipal building

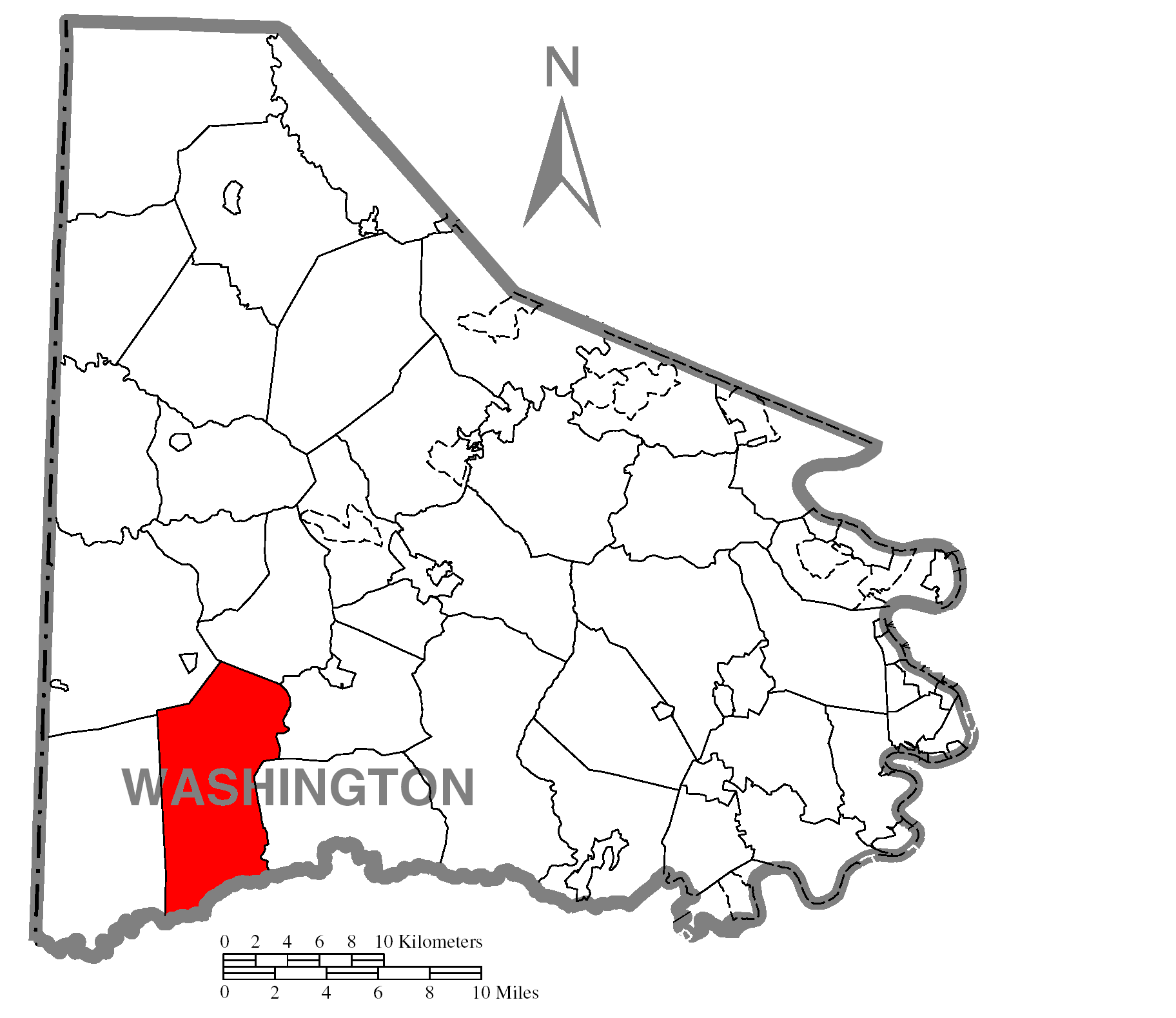
- Location of East Finley Township in Washington County

- Location of Washington County in Pennsylvania
- Country: United States
- State: Pennsylvania
- County: Washington County

Area
  - Total: 35.12 sq mi (90.95 km^{2})
  - Land: 35.12 sq mi (90.95 km^{2})
  - Water: 0 sq mi (0.00 km^{2})

Population (2020)
  - Total: 1,289 ▼
  - Estimate (2023): 1,276
  - Density: 38.5/sq mi (14.87/km^{2})
- Time zone: UTC-4 (EST)
  - Summer (DST): UTC-5 (EDT)
- Area code: 724
- FIPS code: 42-125-21144

East Finley Township is a township in Washington County, Pennsylvania, United States. The population was 1,289 at the 2020 census.

== History ==
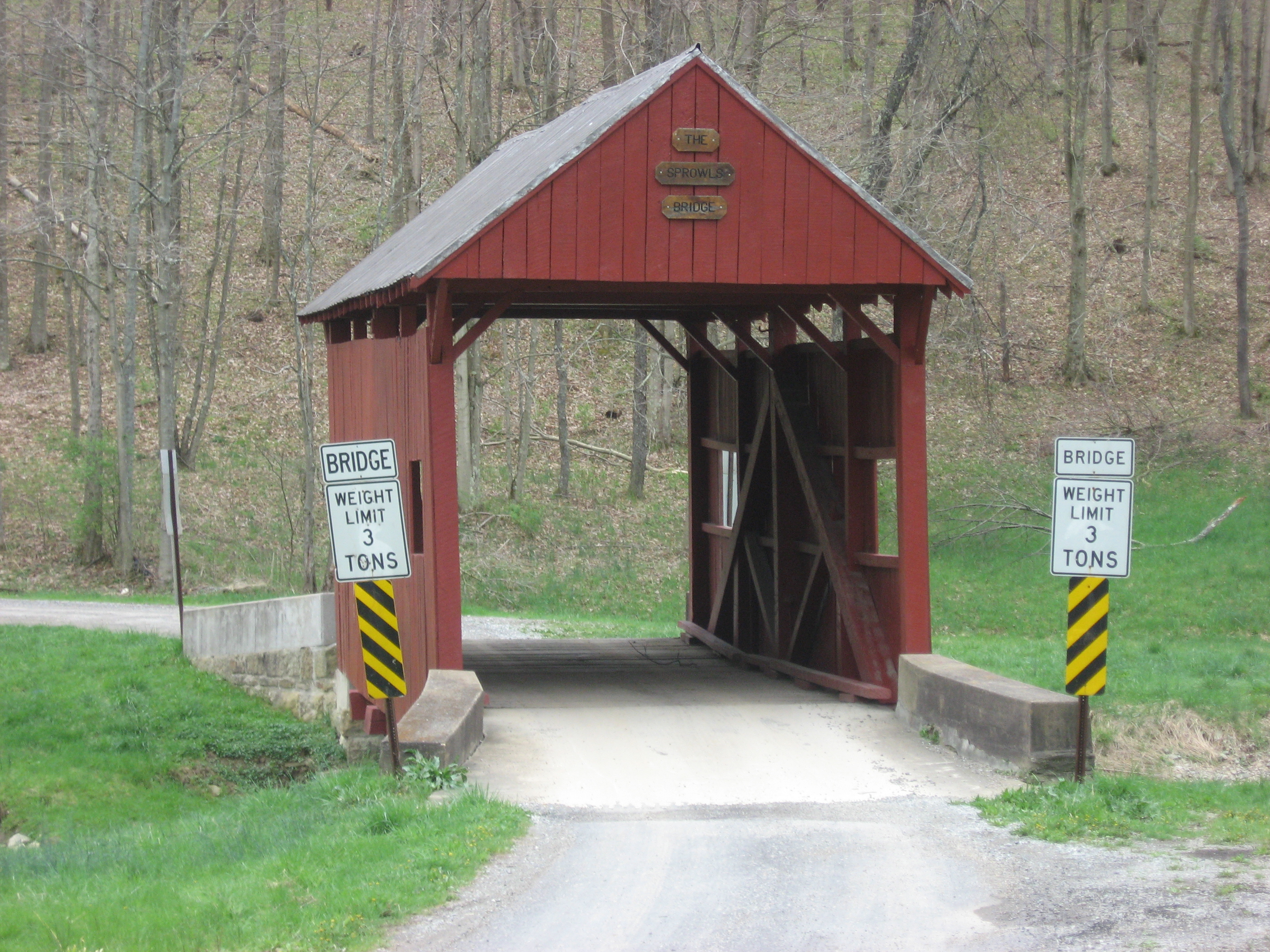
Sprowl's Covered Bridge (1875) National Register of Historic Places

The Scott Brownlee Covered Bridge, Plant's Covered Bridge, Sprowl's Covered Bridge and Wyit Sprowls Covered Bridge are listed on the National Register of Historic Places.

== Geography ==
According to the United States Census Bureau, the township has a total area of 35.1 square miles (91 km^{2}), all land.

== Demographics ==
Historical population
Census	Pop.	Note	%±
2000	1,489		—
2010	1,392		−6.5%
2020	1,289		−7.4%
2025 (est.)	1,286		−0.2%
U.S. Decennial Census

At the 2000 census there were 1,489 people, 516 households, and 423 families living in the township. The population density was 42.4 people per square mile (16.4 people/km^{2}). There were 550 housing units at an average density of 15.7 per square mile (6.1/km^{2}). The racial makeup of the township was 99.73% White, 0.13% African American, 0.07% Native American, and 0.07% from two or more races. Of the 516 households 36.6% had children under the age of 18 living with them, 71.7% were married couples living together, 6.2% had a female householder with no husband present, and 18.0% were non-families. 15.7% of households were one person and 7.4% were one person aged 65 or older. The average household size was 2.84 and the average family size was 3.17.

The age distribution was 27.0% under the age of 18, 6.9% from 18 to 24, 28.2% from 25 to 44, 26.1% from 45 to 64, and 11.9% 65 or older. The median age was 38 years. For every 100 females, there were 109.1 males. For every 100 females age 18 and over, there were 103.2 males.

The median household income was $39,063 and the median family income was $43,516. Males had a median income of $31,250 versus $20,078 for females. The per capita income for the township was $14,675. About 9.9% of families and 12.1% of the population were below the poverty line, including 18.6% of those under age 18 and 4.4% of those age 65 or over.
