= Donegal Township, Washington County, Pennsylvania =

Township in Pennsylvania, US

Donegal
- Township
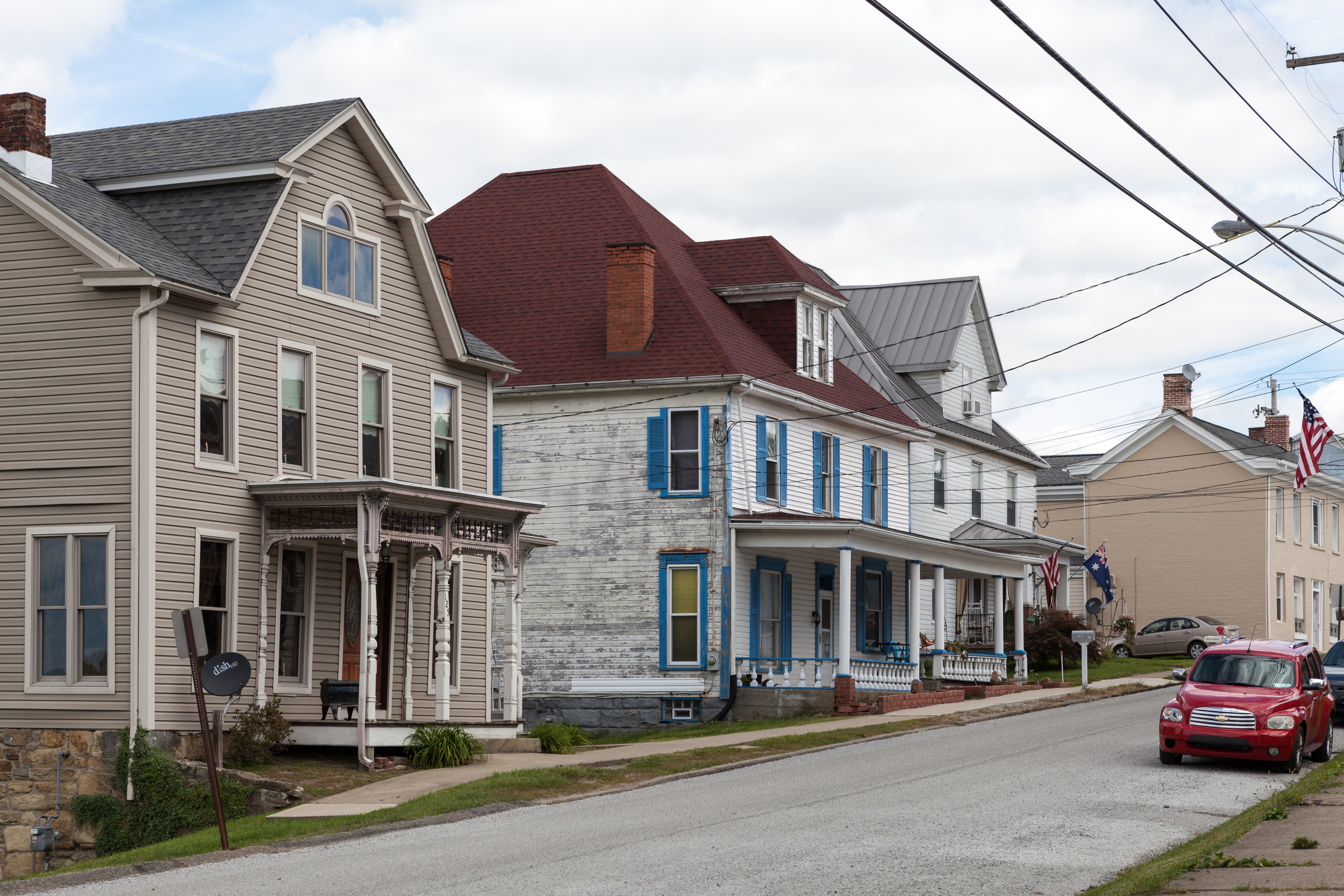
- Main Street in West Alexander

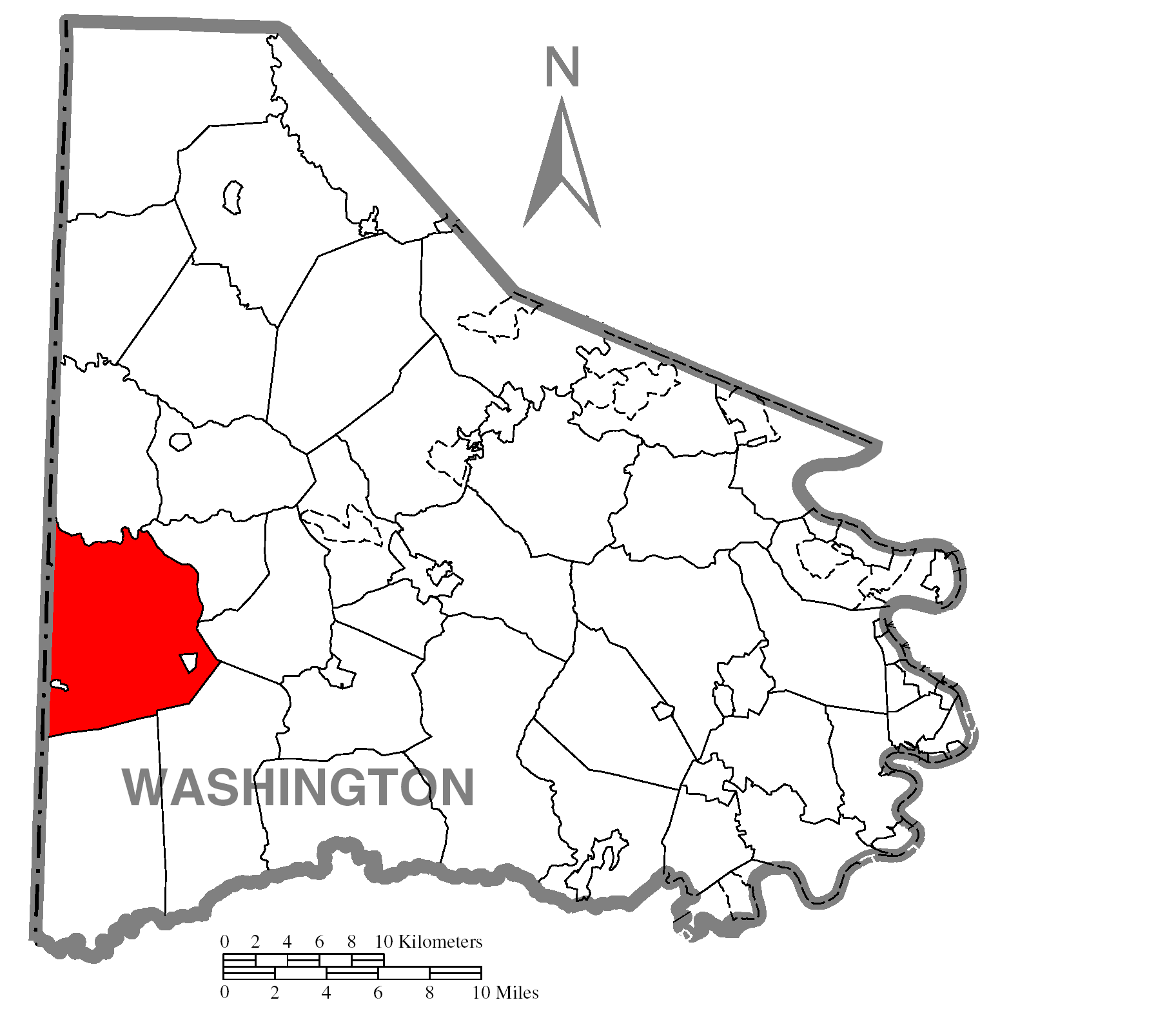
- Location of Donegal Township in Washington County

- Location of Washington County in Pennsylvania
- Country: United States
- State: Pennsylvania
- County: Washington County

Area
  - Total: 41.66 sq mi (107.89 km^{2})
  - Land: 41.48 sq mi (107.44 km^{2})
  - Water: 0.17 sq mi (0.45 km^{2})

Population (2020)
  - Total: 2,397
  - Estimate (2023): 2,376
  - Density: 58.4/sq mi (22.56/km^{2})
- Time zone: UTC-4 (EST)
  - Summer (DST): UTC-5 (EDT)
- Area code: 724
- FIPS code: 42-125-19464
- Website: www.donegaltownshippa.com

Historical population
Census	Pop.	Note	%±
2000	2,428		—
2010	2,465		1.5%
2020	2,397		−2.8%
2025 (est.)	2,379		−0.8%
U.S. Decennial Census

Donegal Township is a township in Washington County, Pennsylvania, United States. The population was 2,397 at the 2020 census.

It was named after the town and county of Donegal in Ireland. At the 2000 census, 13.7% of the population were reported to be Scotch-Irish (Ulster Scots), the highest number in the United States.

== History ==
The Margaret Derrow House, Blaney Mays Covered Bridge and West Alexander Historic District are listed on the National Register of Historic Places.

== Geography ==
According to the United States Census Bureau, the township has a total area of 41.5 square miles (107 km^{2}), of which 41.4 square miles (107 km^{2}) is land and 0.1 square miles (0.26 km^{2}) (0.31%) is water. It contains the census-designated place of West Alexander.

== Demographics ==
Largest ancestries (2000)	Percent
German (Germany)	27.0%
Irish (Republic of Ireland)	16.1%
Scotch-Irish (Ulster)	15.2%
English (England)	11.2%
Italian (Italy)	7.0%
American (United States)	6.7%
Polish (Poland)	6.0%

As of the census of 2000, there were 2,428 people, 945 households, and 721 families living in the township. The population density was 58.7 inhabitants per square mile (22.7/km^{2}). There were 996 housing units at an average density of 24.1/sq mi (9.3/km^{2}). The racial makeup of the township was 99.22% White, 0.08% African American, 0.08% Native American, 0.08% Asian, 0.08% Pacific Islander, and 0.45% from two or more races. Hispanic or Latino people of any race were 0.12% of the population.

There were 945 households, out of which 32.5% had children under the age of 18 living with them, 63.3% were married couples living together, 9.5% had a female householder with no husband present, and 23.7% were non-families. 21.8% of all households were made up of individuals, and 10.4% had someone living alone who was 65 years of age or older. The average household size was 2.55 and the average family size was 2.97.

In the township the population was spread out, with 24.2% under the age of 18, 6.3% from 18 to 24, 27.8% from 25 to 44, 27.3% from 45 to 64, and 14.3% who were 65 years of age or older. The median age was 40 years. For every 100 females there were 101.2 males. For every 100 females age 18 and over, there were 93.8 males.

The median income for a household in the township was $38,203, and the median income for a family was $43,839. Males had a median income of $33,750 versus $20,288 for females. The per capita income for the township was $17,288. About 7.5% of families and 9.0% of the population were below the poverty line, including 13.0% of those under age 18 and 8.1% of those age 65 or over.
