= Erskine Covered Bridge =

- U.S. National Register of Historic Places
- Washington County History & Landmarks Foundation Landmark
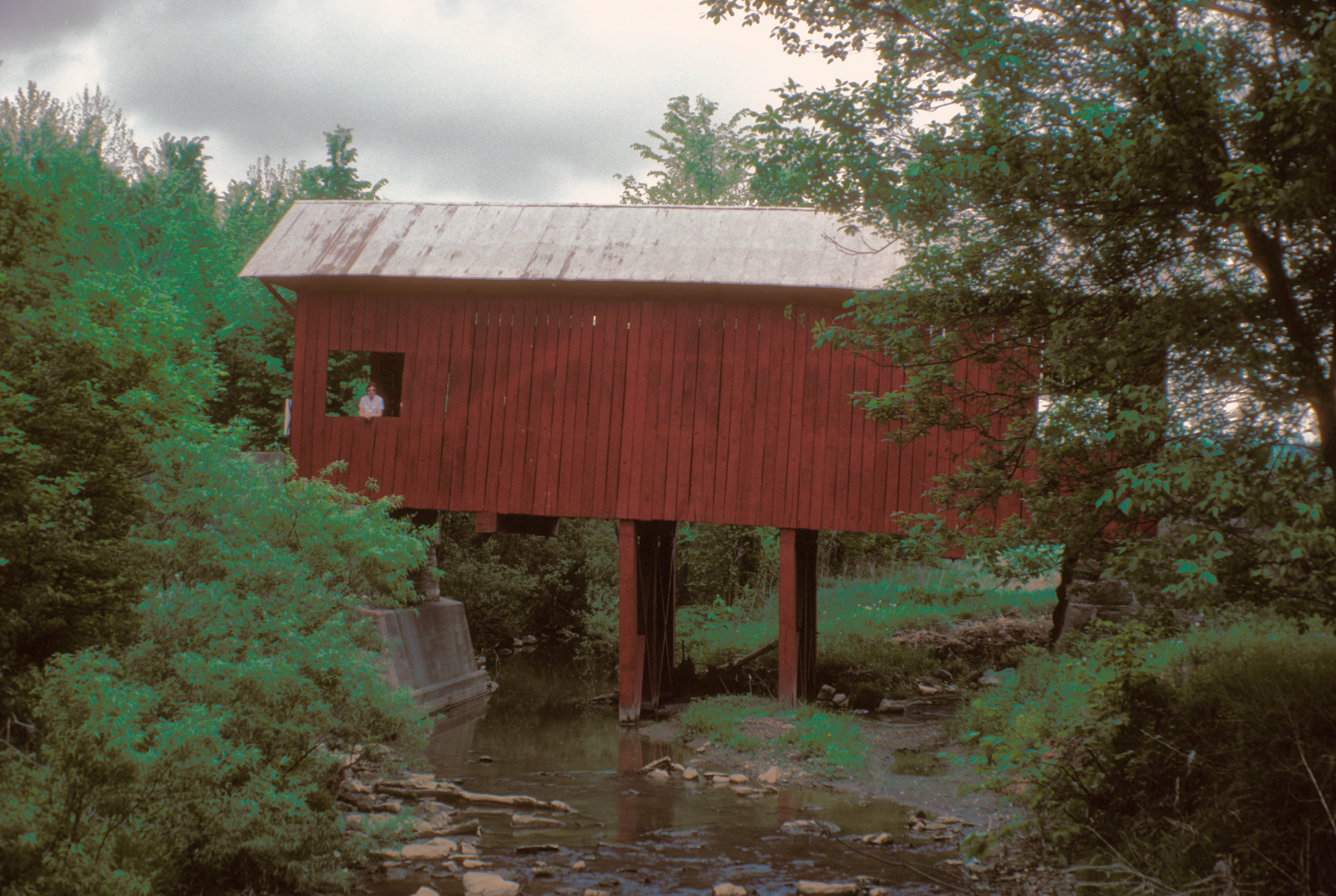

- Location within Pennsylvania Location within the United States
- Nearest city: West Alexander, Pennsylvania
- Coordinates: 40°3′59″N 80°30′59″W
- Area: 0.1 acres (0.040 ha)
- Built: 1845
- Architect: Gordon, William
- Architectural style: Queenpost truss
- MPS: Covered Bridges of Washington and Greene Counties TR
- NRHP reference No.: 79002359
- Added to NRHP: June 22, 1979

The Erskine Covered Bridge is a historic covered bridge in West Alexander, Pennsylvania.

It is designated as a historic bridge by the Washington County History & Landmarks Foundation.
