= Dusmal House =

Historic house in Pennsylvania, United States

- U.S. National Register of Historic Places
- Washington County History & Landmarks Foundation Landmark
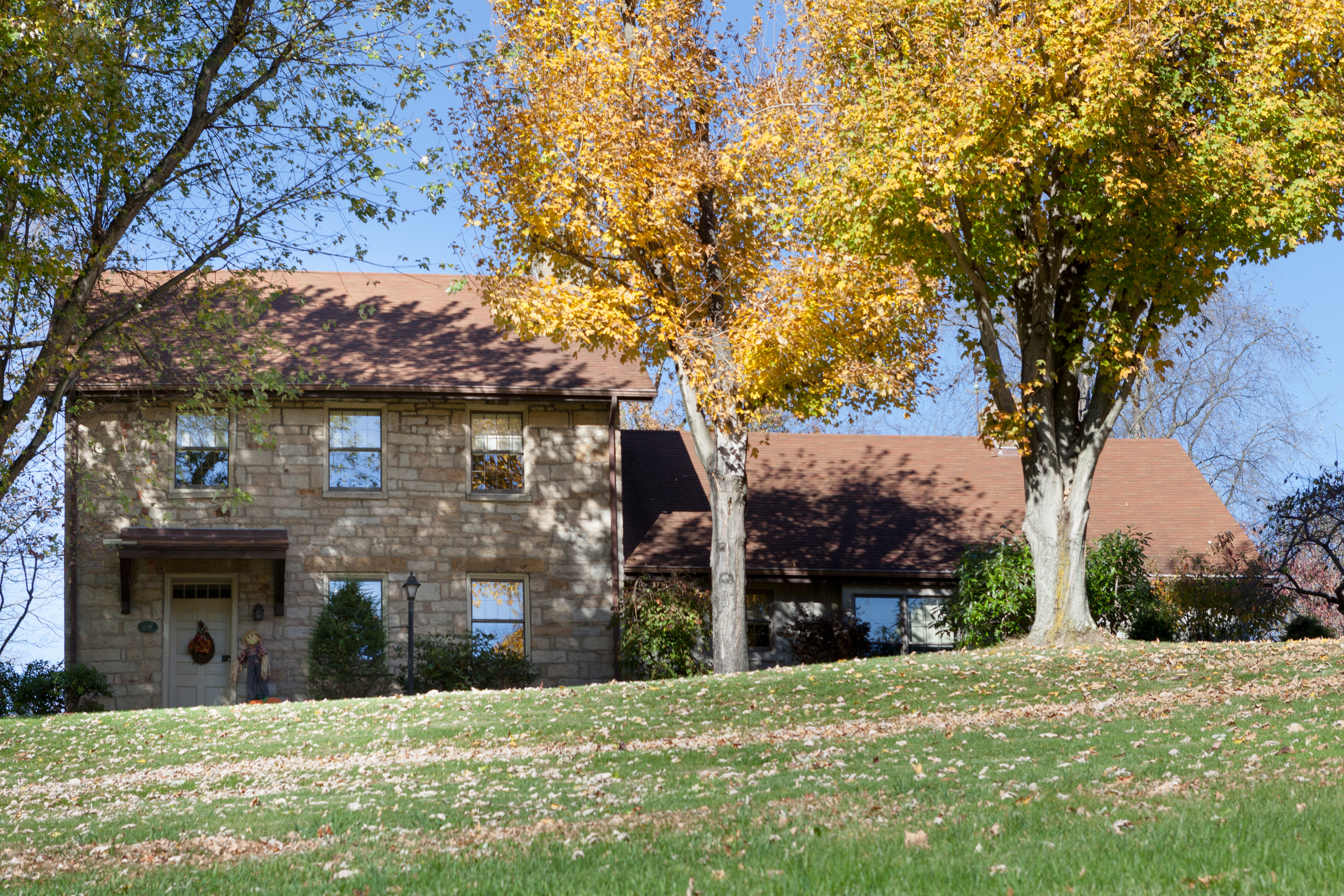
- East side of the house, October 2014

- Location within Pennsylvania Location within the United States
- Nearest city: Gastonville, Pennsylvania
- Coordinates: 40°15′10″N 79°57′55″W
- Area: 1 acre (0.40 ha)
- Built: 1832
- Architectural style: Post Colonial Vernacular
- NRHP reference No.: 75001675
- Added to NRHP: February 24, 1975

Dusmal House is a historic building in Gastonville, Pennsylvania. It is a three-bay, 2 1/2-story house built in 1839. A one-story addition was added later in the nineteenth century. The historic significance of the house is as an example of the Post Colonial style of architecture found in Western Pennsylvania. Vernacular builders mixed elements of Georgian, Roman Classical, Adamesque, and European Renaissance styles as they saw fit, differing from traditions in other parts of the country.

In addition to its National Register of Historic Places listing, it is also designated as a historic residential landmark/farmstead by the Washington County History & Landmarks Foundation.
