= Ralston Freeman Covered Bridge =

- U.S. National Register of Historic Places
- Washington County History & Landmarks Foundation Landmark
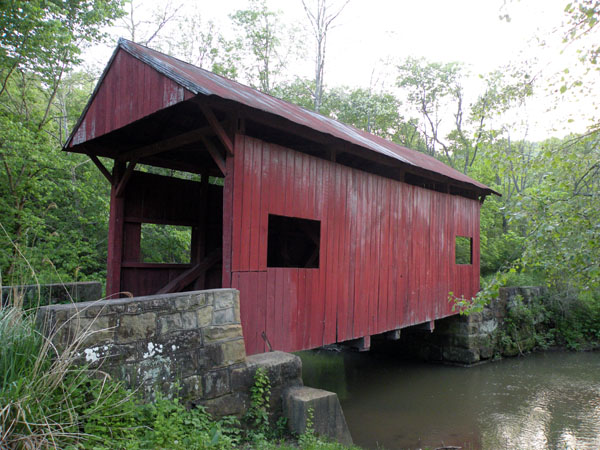
- Ralston Freeman Covered Bridge in 2010

- Location within Pennsylvania Location within the United States
- Nearest city: Paris, Pennsylvania
- Coordinates: 40°26′49″N 80°30′26″W
- Area: 0.1 acres (0.040 ha)
- Architectural style: Kingpost truss
- MPS: Covered Bridges of Washington and Greene Counties TR
- NRHP reference No.: 79003827
- Added to NRHP: June 22, 1979

The Ralston Freeman Covered Bridge is a historic covered bridge in Paris, Pennsylvania.

It is designated as a historic bridge by the Washington County History & Landmarks Foundation.
