= Devil's Den, McClurg Covered Bridge =

- U.S. National Register of Historic Places
- Washington County History & Landmarks Foundation Landmark
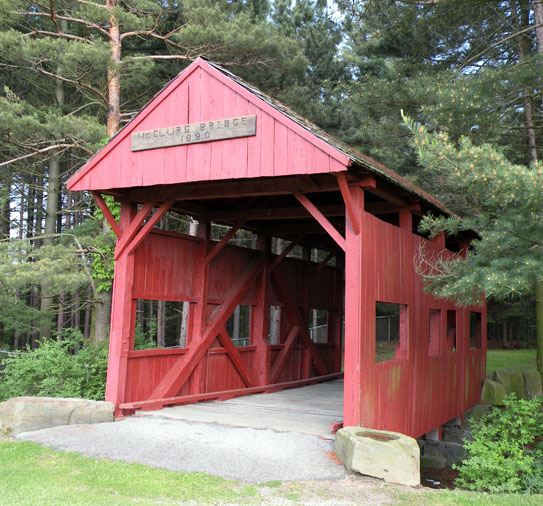
- Devil's Den, McClurg Covered Bridge in 2010

- Location within Pennsylvania Location within the United States
- Nearest city: Paris, Pennsylvania
- Coordinates: 40°25′29″N 80°30′24″W
- Area: 0.1 acres (0.040 ha)
- Architectural style: Kingpost truss
- MPS: Covered Bridges of Washington and Greene Counties TR
- NRHP reference No.: 79003828
- Added to NRHP: June 22, 1979

The Devil's Den, McClurg Covered Bridge is a historic King post truss covered bridge in Paris, Pennsylvania. Built in 1880, the bridge originally was part of Devil's Den Road and crossed Kings Creek in Paris, PA. The bridge was relocated to its present location in 1987. It crosses a small ravine in Hanover Township Park along Old Steubenville Pike. It is only open to foot traffic. It is 12'3" wide and 24' long, with red vertical plank siding, three rectangular windows on each side, and a cedar shake roof. The bridge is part of an annual Covered Bridge Festival.

It is designated as a historic bridge by the Washington County History & Landmarks Foundation.
