= Joseph Dorsey House =

Historic house in Pennsylvania, United States

- U.S. National Register of Historic Places
- Washington County History & Landmarks Foundation Landmark
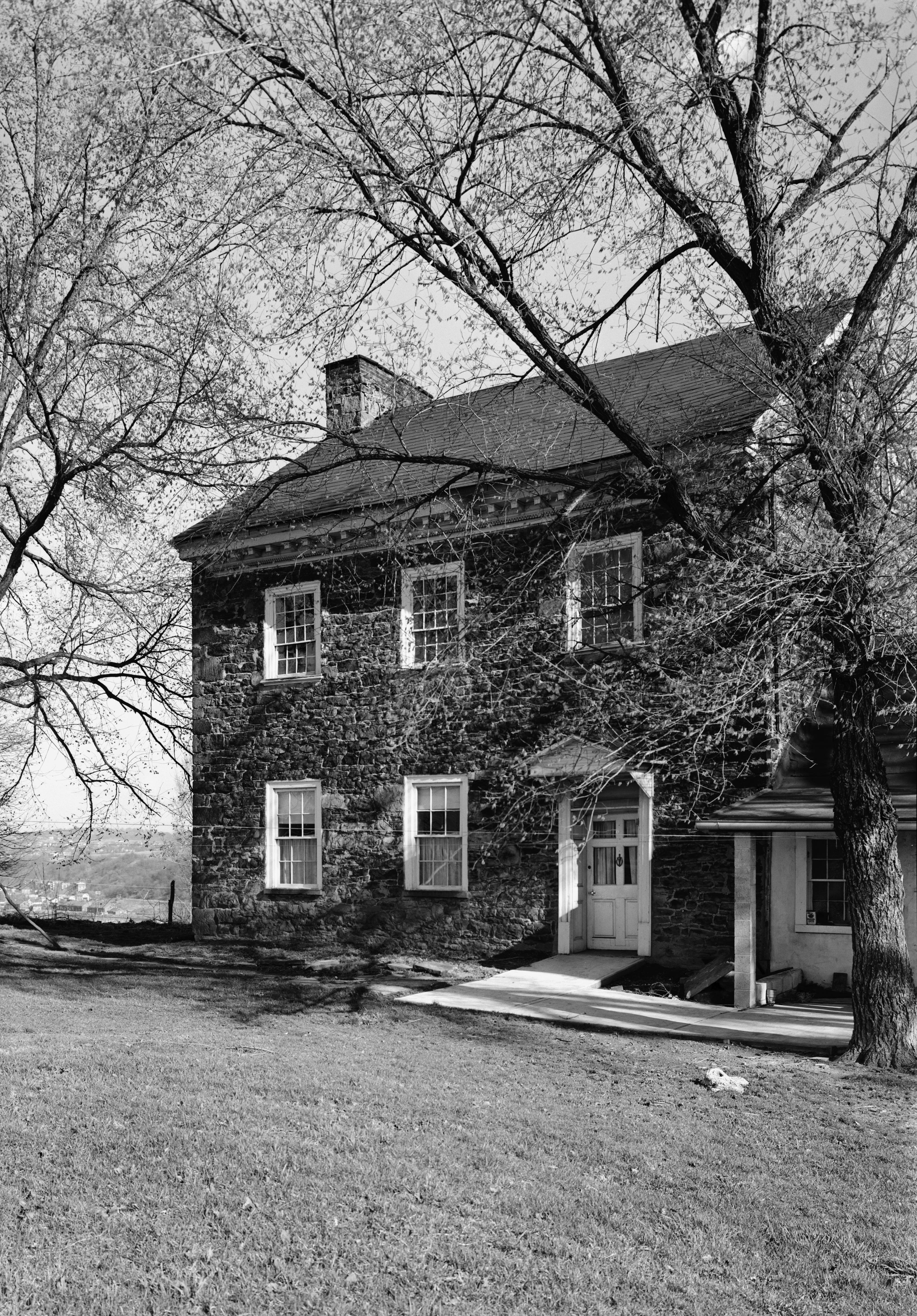
- Joseph Dorsey House in April 1963

- Location within Pennsylvania Location within the United States
- Location: 113 Cherry Ave., West Brownsville, Pennsylvania
- Coordinates: 40°1′14″N 79°55′24″W
- Area: 1 acre (0.40 ha)
- Built: 1787
- Architect: Dorsey, Joseph
- Architectural style: Georgian
- NRHP reference No.: 74001814
- Added to NRHP: November 19, 1974

Joseph Dorsey House was a historic building in West Brownsville, Pennsylvania. It is designated as a historic residential landmark/farmstead by the Washington County History & Landmarks Foundation.

The namesake Joseph Dorsey, a Maryland native, built the stone house c. 1787 on a large estate of 1,280 acres (5.2 km^{2}).

The house no longer stands, having been destroyed by a 1993 fire.

== Significance ==
The Historic American Buildings Survey marked its significance as "a good example of a well preserved 18th century house."
