= Caldwell Tavern =

Historic building in Claysville, Pennsylvania, United States

- U.S. National Register of Historic Places
- Washington County History & Landmarks Foundation Landmark
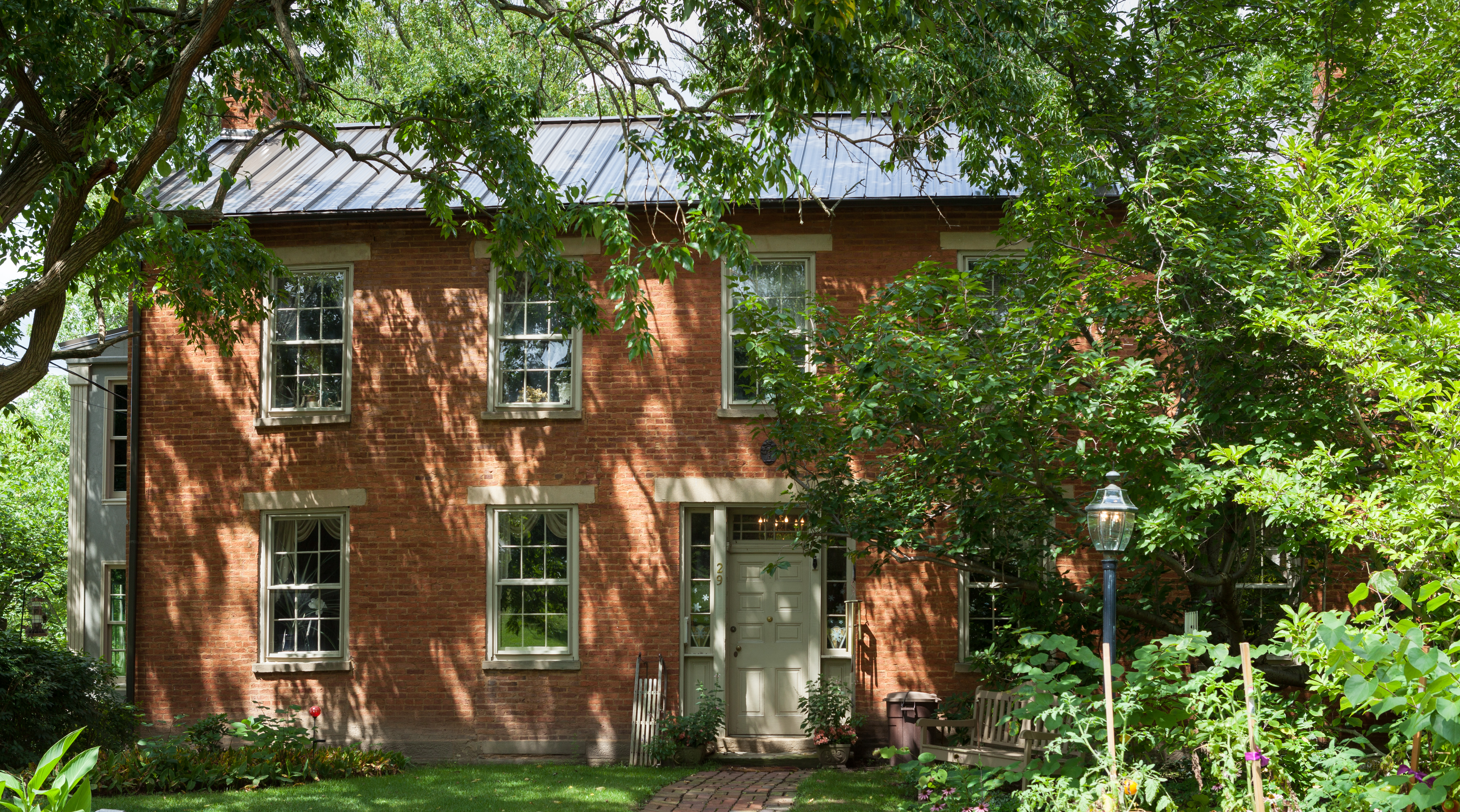
- The tavern in August, 2014

- Location within Pennsylvania Location within the United States
- Location: Jct. of US 40 and TR 474, Buffalo Township, Claysville, Pennsylvania
- Coordinates: 40°8′23″N 80°28′39″W
- Area: Less than one acre
- Built: 1840
- Architectural style: Greek Revival
- MPS: National Road in Pennsylvania MPS
- NRHP reference No.: 96000087
- Added to NRHP: February 16, 1996

Caldwell Tavern is a historic building in Claysville, Pennsylvania. It is designated as a historic residential landmark/farmstead by the Washington County History & Landmarks Foundation.
