= Ulery Mill =

- U.S. National Register of Historic Places
- Washington County History & Landmarks Foundation Landmark
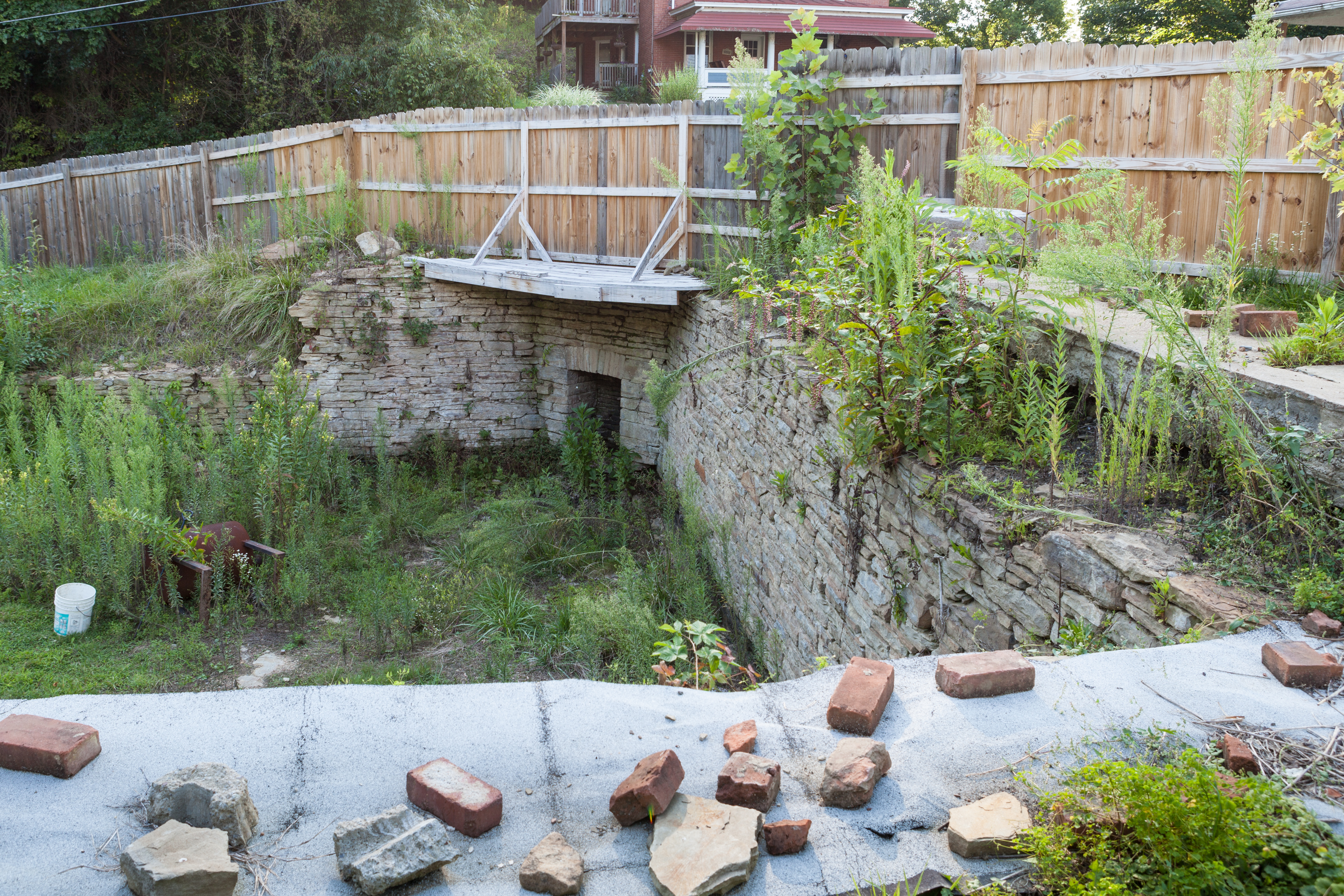
- Remaining portion of Ulery Mill in August 2014

- Location within Pennsylvania Location within the United States
- Nearest city: Marianna, Pennsylvania
- Coordinates: 40°0′40″N 80°4′32″W
- Area: 0.5 acres (0.20 ha)
- Built: 1835
- Architect: Ulerv, Jacob
- NRHP reference No.: 78002481
- Added to NRHP: April 20, 1978

Ulery Mill was a historic building in Marianna, Pennsylvania, United States. It has been demolished.

It is designated as a historic residential landmark/farmstead by the Washington County History & Landmarks Foundation.
