= Henry Covered Bridge (Pennsylvania) =

- U.S. National Register of Historic Places
- Washington County History & Landmarks Foundation Landmark
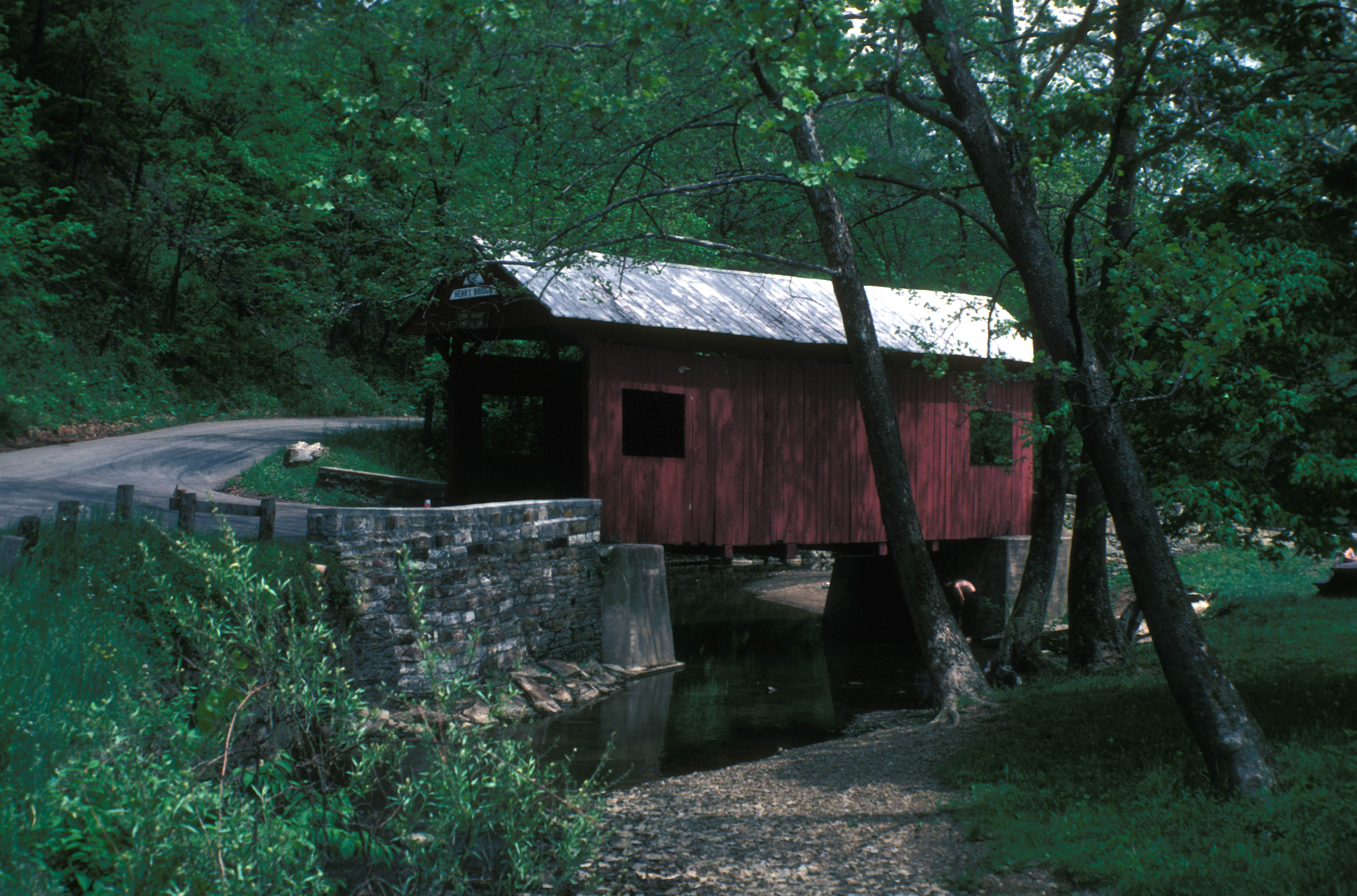

- Location within Pennsylvania Location within the United States
- Nearest city: Monongahela, Pennsylvania
- Coordinates: 40°12′8″N 80°1′1″W
- Area: 0.1 acres (0.040 ha)
- Built: 1881
- Architectural style: Queenpost truss
- MPS: Covered Bridges of Washington and Greene Counties TR
- NRHP reference No.: 79002353
- Added to NRHP: June 22, 1979

The Henry Covered Bridge is a historic covered bridge in Monongahela, Pennsylvania, built in 1881. The bridge is located in Mingo Creek County Park.

It is designated as a historic bridge by the Washington County History & Landmarks Foundation.
