= Sackville House =

Historic house in Pennsylvania, United States

- Formerly listed on the U.S. National Register of Historic Places
- Washington County History & Landmarks Foundation Landmark
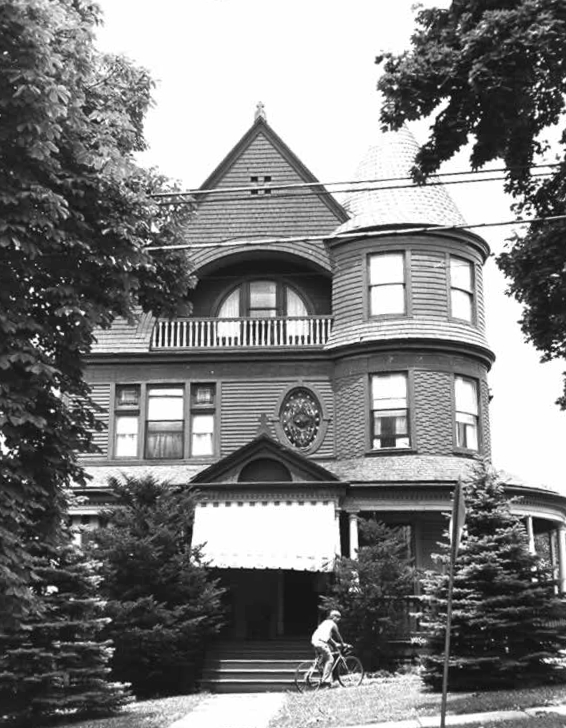
- The Sackville House circa 1980, prior to its demolition

- Location within Pennsylvania Location within the United States
- Location: 309 E. Wheeling St., East Washington, Pennsylvania
- Coordinates: 40°10′14″N 80°14′17″W
- Area: 1 acre (0.40 ha)
- Built: 1890
- Architectural style: Queen Anne, Shingle Style, Romanesque
- NRHP reference No.: 76001680

Significant dates
- Added to NRHP: November 21, 1976
- Removed from NRHP: August 24, 2010

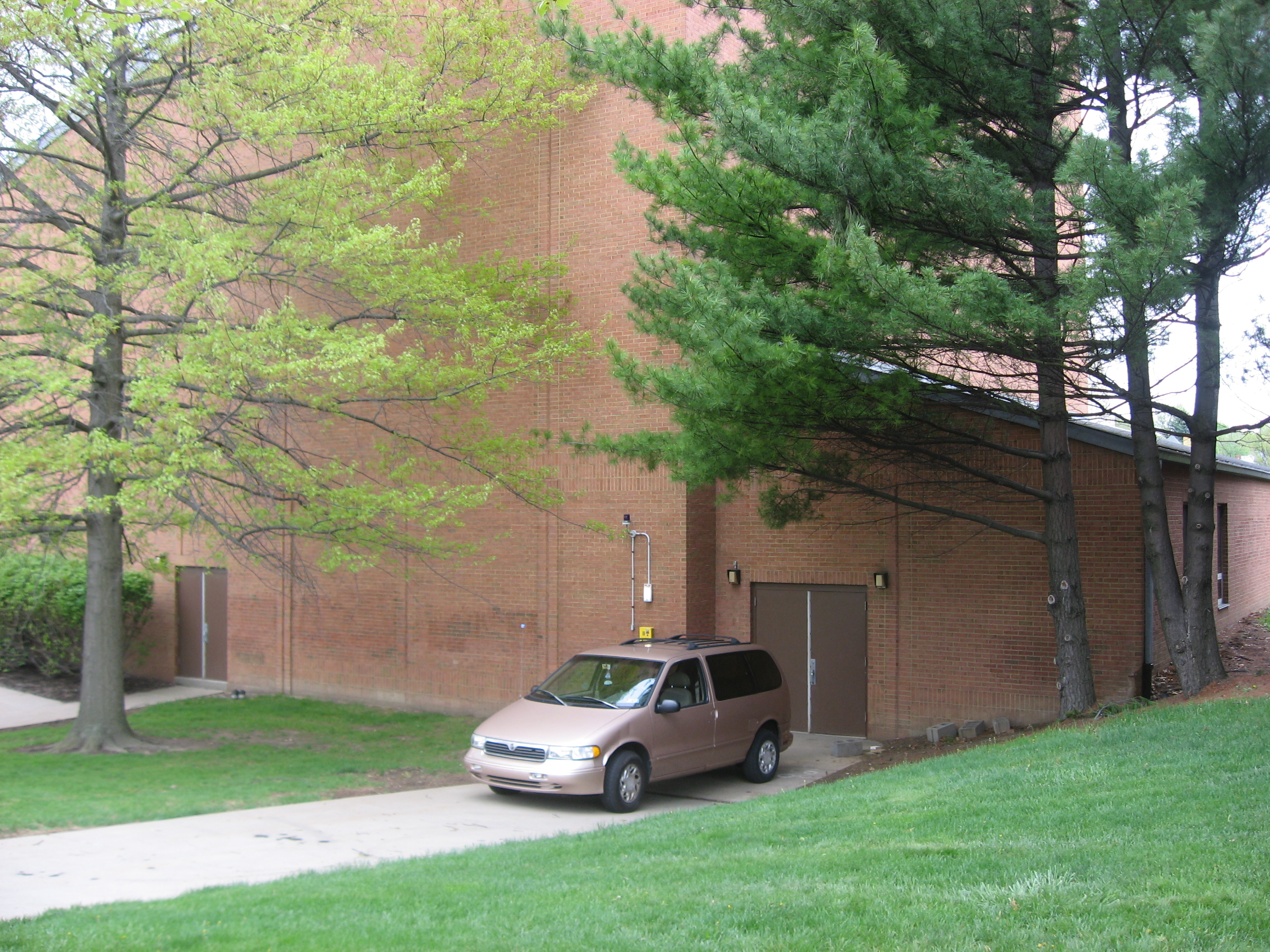
Location of the former Sackville House, currently occupied by the Olin Fine Arts Center.

The Sackville House was a historic building in East Washington, Pennsylvania, US, demolished in 1980.

== History and architectural features ==
The seventeen-room building was constructed in 1884 by John Vester. Ownership of the building passed to Vester's nephew Leo Sackville in 1943.

It was added to the National Register of Historic Places on November 21, 1976. By the late 1970s, the building had been converted to three apartments. Sackville's widow later sold the building to the Washington & Jefferson College.

As the college's plans for the building's demolition progressed, the Washington County History & Landmarks Foundation and the college discussed the possibility of preserving the building; however, zoning issues with East Washington, the projected $40,000 costs of moving, and the additional cost to restore the building after being converted to apartments halted that effort. By 1982, the Olin Fine Arts Center was completed.

The Pennsylvania Historical and Museum Commission's Bureau for Historic Preservation was notified of the building's demolition on June 1, 2010. It was formally de-listed from the National Register of Historic Places on August 24, 2010, roughly 20 years after its demolition.

It continues to be designated as a historic residential landmark/farmstead by the Washington County History & Landmarks Foundation.
