= Bethel African Methodist Episcopal Church of Monongahela City =

Historic church in Pennsylvania, United States

- U.S. National Register of Historic Places
- Washington County History & Landmarks Foundation Landmark
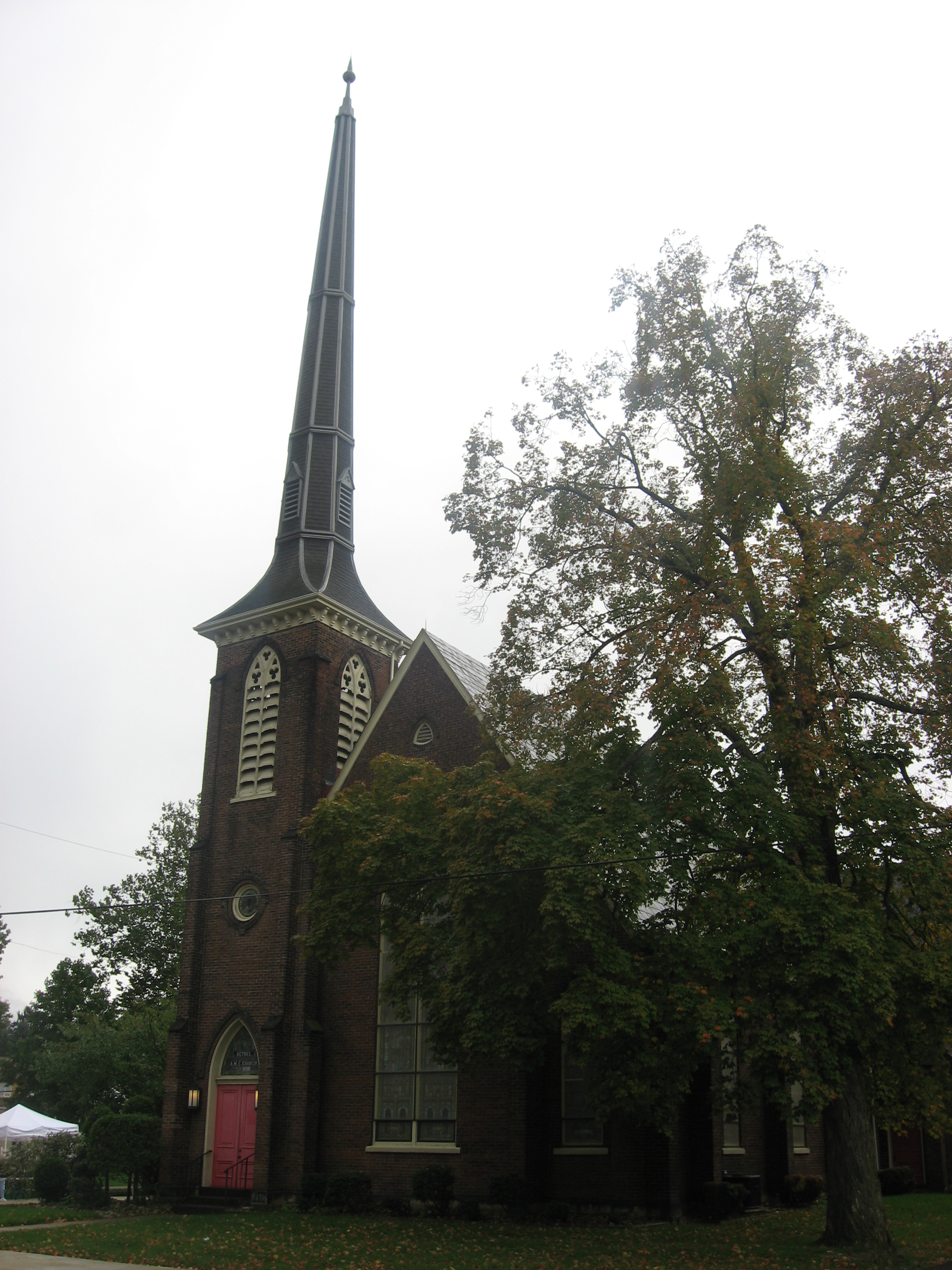
- Front of the church, seen from the west

- Location within Pennsylvania Location within the United States
- Location: Jct. 7th and Main Sts., Monongahela, Pennsylvania
- Coordinates: 40°12′26″N 79°55′55″W
- Area: less than one acre
- Built: 1871
- Architect: Blythe, John
- Architectural style: Gothic Revival
- NRHP reference No.: 02001298
- Added to NRHP: November 7, 2002

Bethel African Methodist Episcopal Church of Monongahela City is a historic church at the junction of 7th and Main Streets in Monongahela City, Pennsylvania.

It was built in 1871 and added to the National Register in 2002.

It is a brick Gothic Revival style building, one of about five Gothic Revival buildings in the city.

It is designated as a historic public landmark by the Washington County History & Landmarks Foundation.
