= Martin Farmstead =

Historic house in Pennsylvania, United States

- U.S. National Register of Historic Places
- Washington County History & Landmarks Foundation Landmark
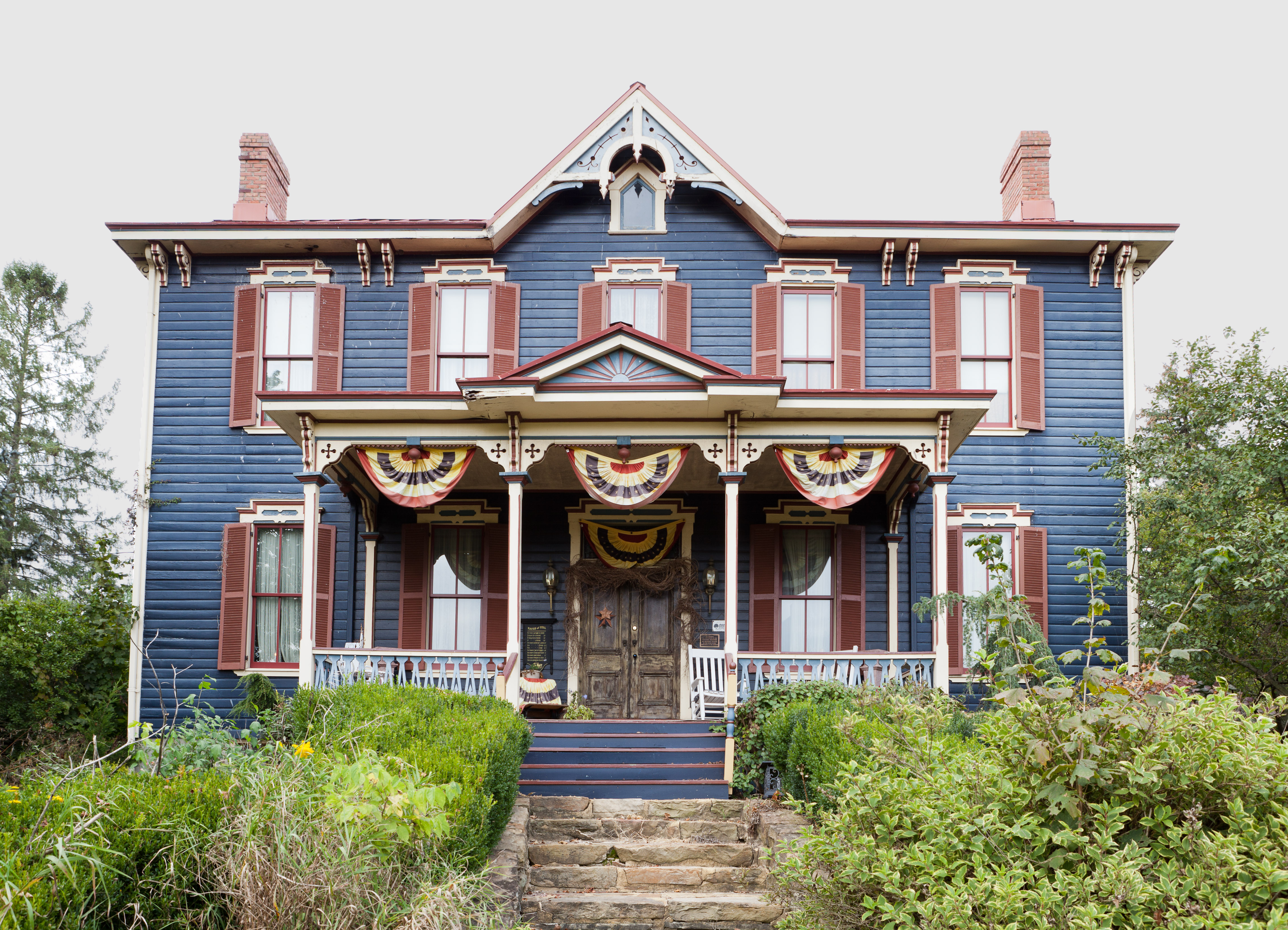

- Location within Pennsylvania Location within the United States
- Nearest city: Washington, Pennsylvania
- Coordinates: 40°11′1″N 80°10′6″W
- Area: 26.4 acres (10.7 ha)
- Built: 1860
- Architectural style: Italianate, Queen Anne
- NRHP reference No.: 95000886
- Added to NRHP: July 21, 1995

The Martin Farmstead is a historic building in Washington, Pennsylvania.

It is designated as a historic residential landmark/farmstead by the Washington County History & Landmarks Foundation.
