= Beallsville Historic District =

Historic district in Pennsylvania, United States

- U.S. National Register of Historic Places
- U.S. Historic district
- Washington County History & Landmarks Foundation Landmark
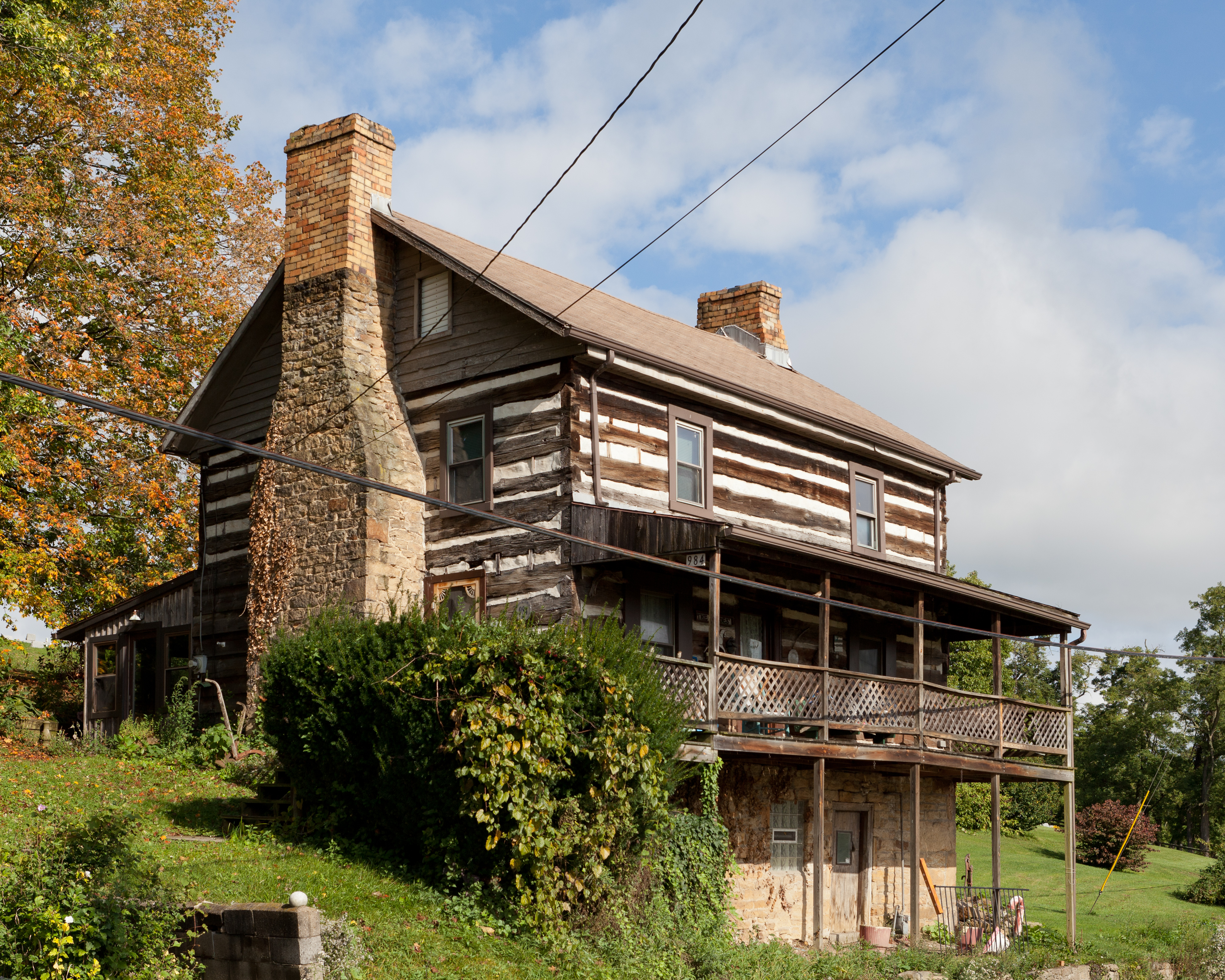

- Location within Pennsylvania Location within the United States
- Nearest city: Beallsville, Pennsylvania
- Coordinates: 40°3′54″N 80°1′23″W
- Area: 40 acres (16 ha)
- Built: 1818
- Architectural style: Italianate, Greek Revival, Federal
- MPS: National Road in Pennsylvania MPS
- NRHP reference No.: 96001205
- Added to NRHP: October 24, 1996

Beallsville Historic District is a 40-acre (16 ha) district in Beallsville, Pennsylvania. It is designated as a historic district by the Washington County History & Landmarks Foundation.

The district covers a "typical pike town" of the National Road through this area, meeting criteria laid out in a Multiple Property Submission study. It was listed on the National Register of Historic Places in 1996. In 1996, there were 91 contributing buildings, 1 other contributing site (the Beallsville Cemetery), 1 other contributing object (a c.1835 National Road iron milestone marker), and 29 non-contributing buildings, in the district.

In the western part of the district the buildings are largely vernacular with Greek Revival or Federal architectural influences showing in many, from the National Road era of 1818–1852. The eastern part of the district includes larger Italianate and Queen Anne style houses from later in the 19th century.

Significant properties in the district include:

- 984 Maiden Street, the oldest building in the district, a log building from 1788 that was home of town founder Zephaniah Beall
- the 1821 Greenfield Stand, a.k.a. Greenfield Tavern, at 2848 Maiden Street
- the John Hough House, at 2852 Main Street, an "unassuming" house of a tollkeeper on the road
- Beallsville Methodist Church, from 1874
