= Pine Bank Covered Bridge =

- U.S. National Register of Historic Places
- Washington County History & Landmarks Foundation Landmark
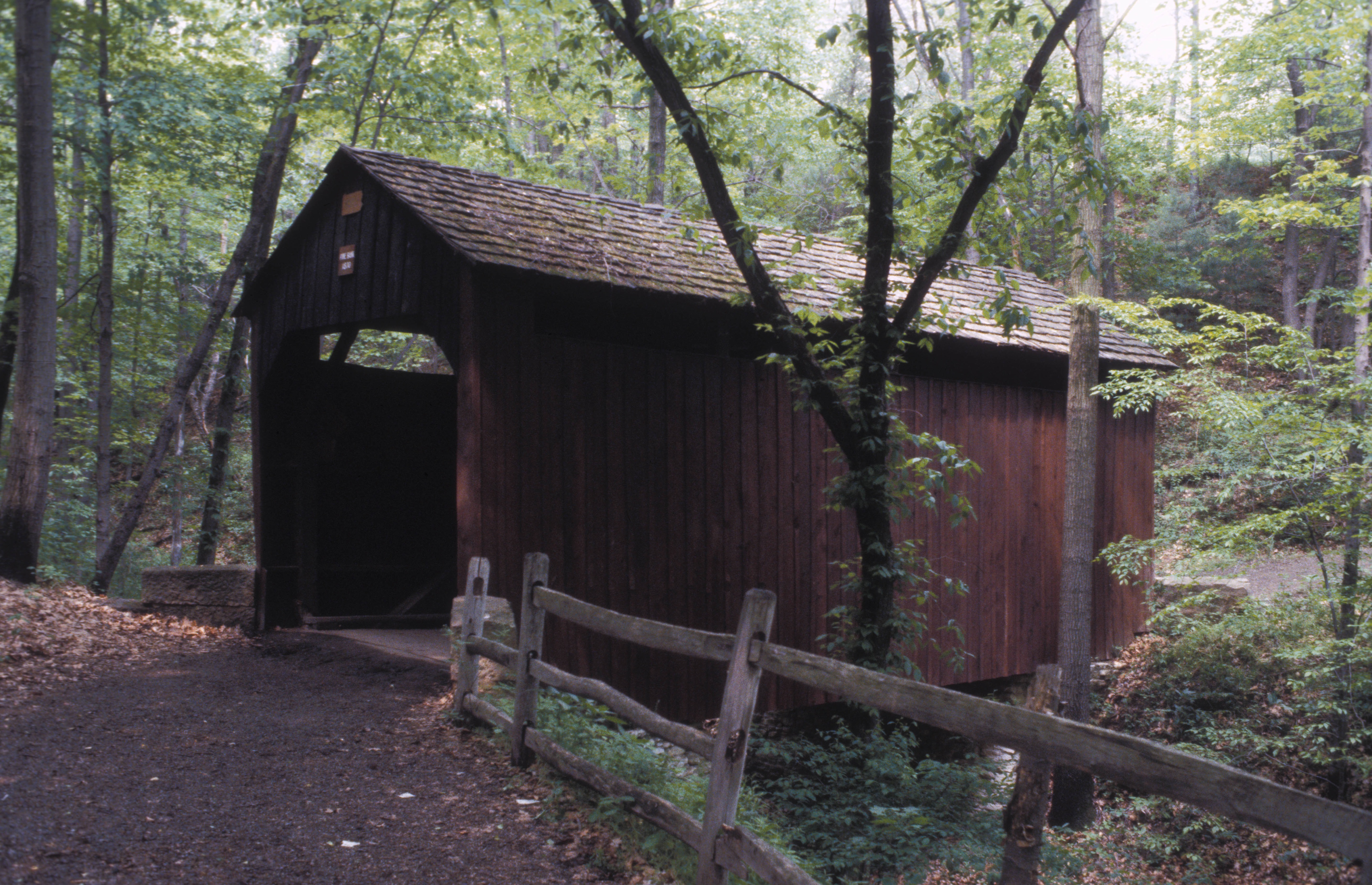

- Location within Pennsylvania Location within the United States
- Nearest city: Studa, Pennsylvania
- Coordinates: 40°17′20″N 80°29′27″W
- Area: 0.1 acres (0.040 ha)
- Built: 1871
- Architectural style: Kingpost truss
- MPS: Covered Bridges of Washington and Greene Counties TR
- NRHP reference No.: 79003824
- Added to NRHP: June 22, 1979

The Pine Bank Covered Bridge is a historic covered bridge located at the Meadowcroft Museum of Rural Life in Avella, Pennsylvania. The bridge was built in 1871 and moved to its current location in 1962.

It is designated as a historic bridge by the Washington County History & Landmarks Foundation.
