= Dr. Joseph Maurer House =

Historic house in Pennsylvania, United States

- U.S. National Register of Historic Places
- Washington County History & Landmarks Foundation Landmark
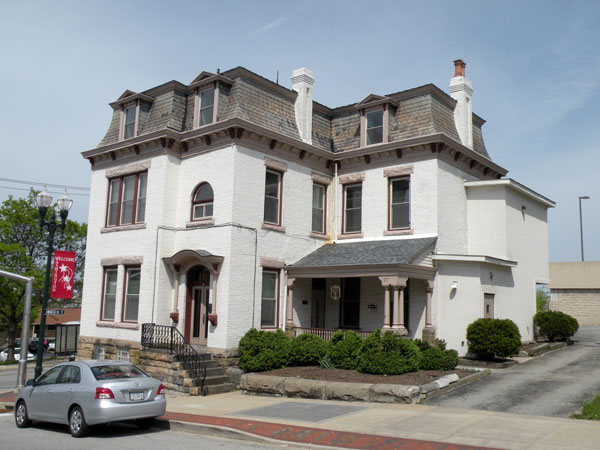

- Location within Pennsylvania Location within the United States
- Location: 97 W. Wheeling St., Washington, Pennsylvania
- Coordinates: 40°10′8″N 80°14′52″W
- Area: less than one acre
- Built: 1896
- Architectural style: Second Empire
- NRHP reference No.: 93001470
- Added to NRHP: December 30, 1993

The Dr. Joseph Maurer House is a historic house in Washington, Pennsylvania.

It is designated as a historic residential landmark/farmstead by the Washington County History & Landmarks Foundation.
