= Scott Brownlee Covered Bridge =

- U.S. National Register of Historic Places
- Washington County History & Landmarks Foundation Landmark
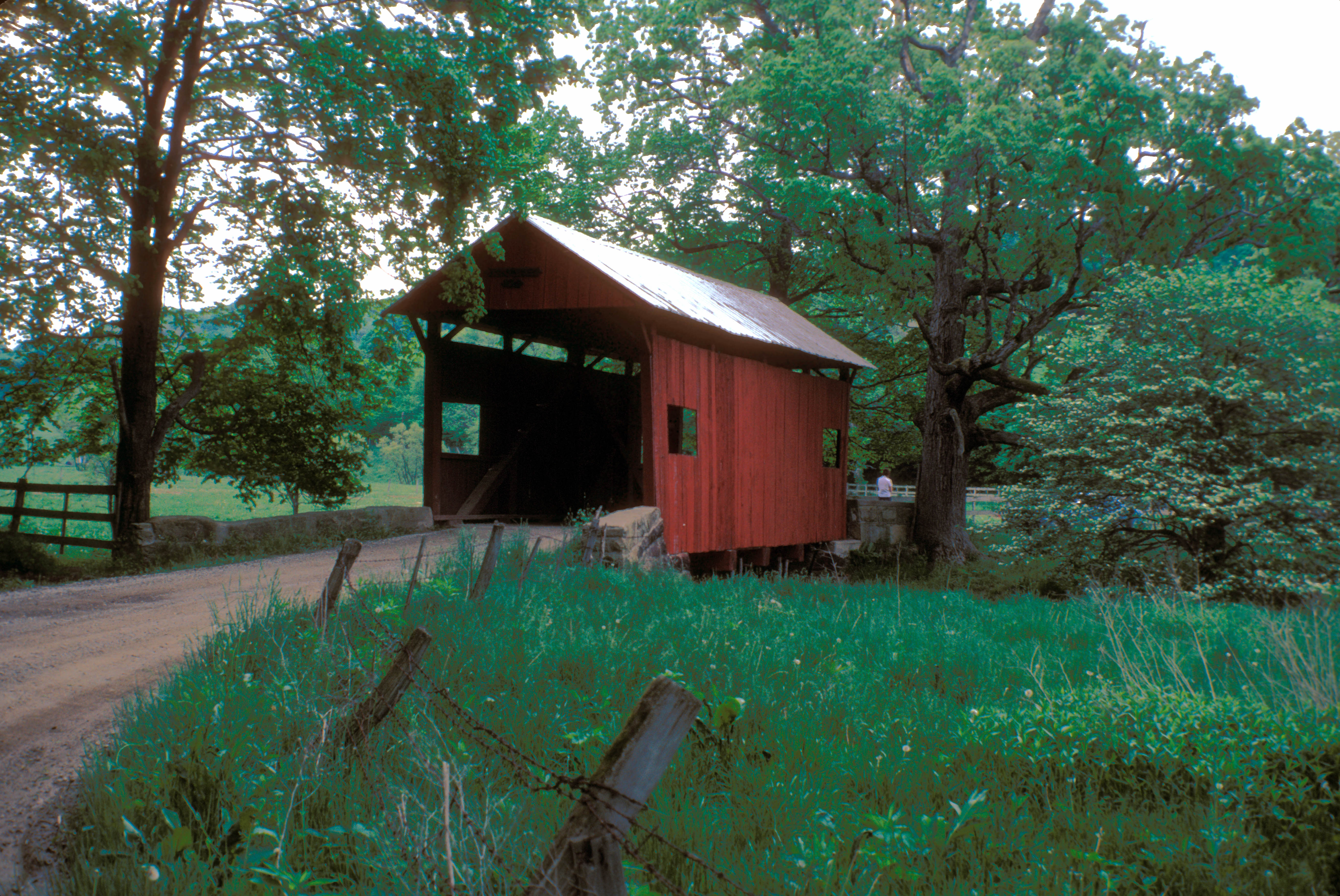
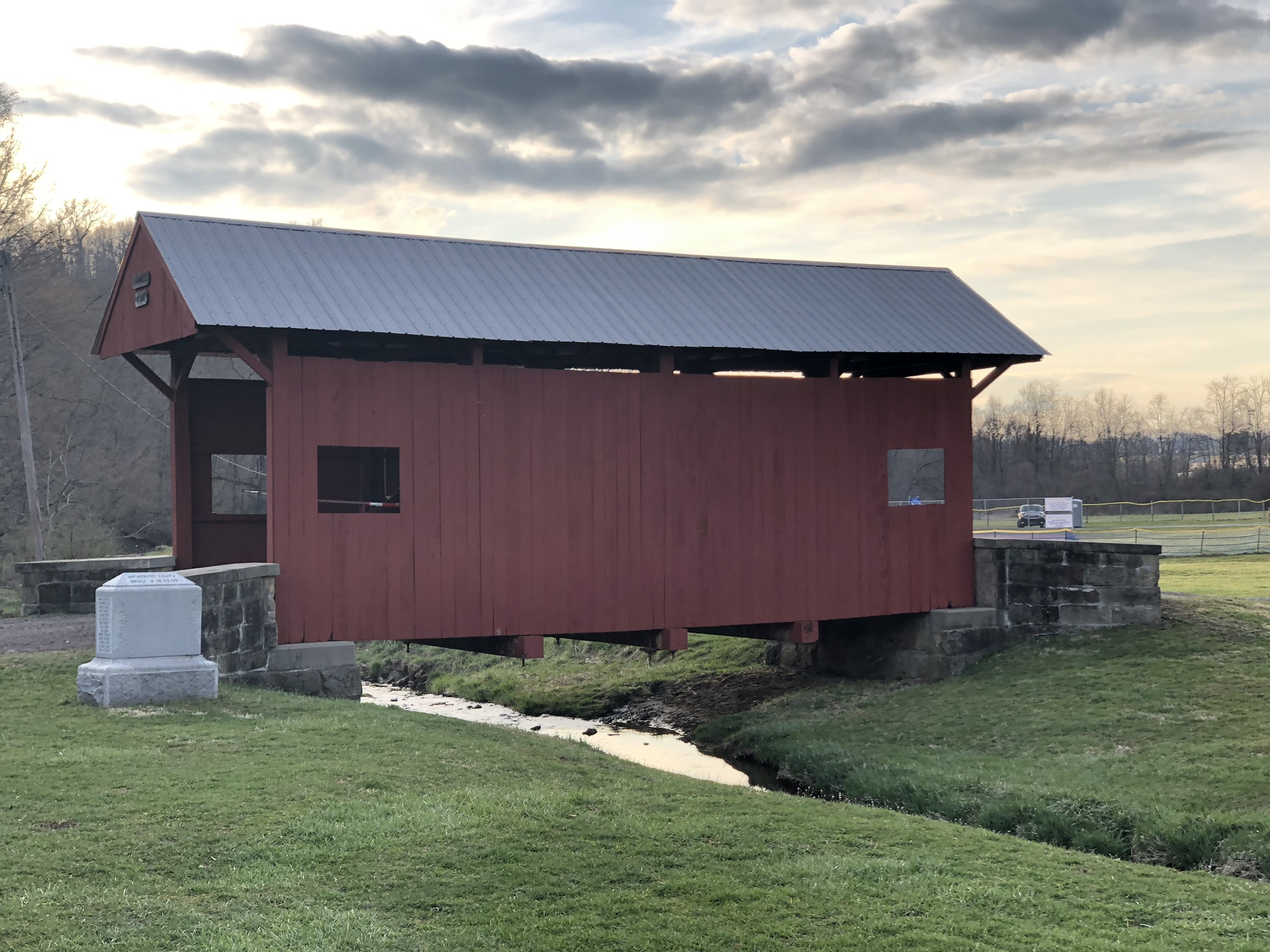
- The bridge in its original location Brownie Covered Bridge in its new Location at McGuffey Community Park. This is where the bridge was moved to in 2008 and remains today.

- Location within Pennsylvania Location within the United States
- Nearest city: West Finley, Pennsylvania
- Coordinates: 40°2′38″N 80°23′53″W
- Area: 0.1 acres (0.040 ha)
- Architectural style: Kingpost truss
- MPS: Covered Bridges of Washington and Greene Counties TR
- NRHP reference No.: 79002360
- Added to NRHP: June 22, 1979

The Scott Brownlee Covered Bridge is a historic covered bridge in West Finley, Pennsylvania. It is designated as a historic bridge by the Washington County History & Landmarks Foundation.
