= Gastonville, Pennsylvania =

Unincorporated community in Pennsylvania, US

Gastonville
- Census-designated place
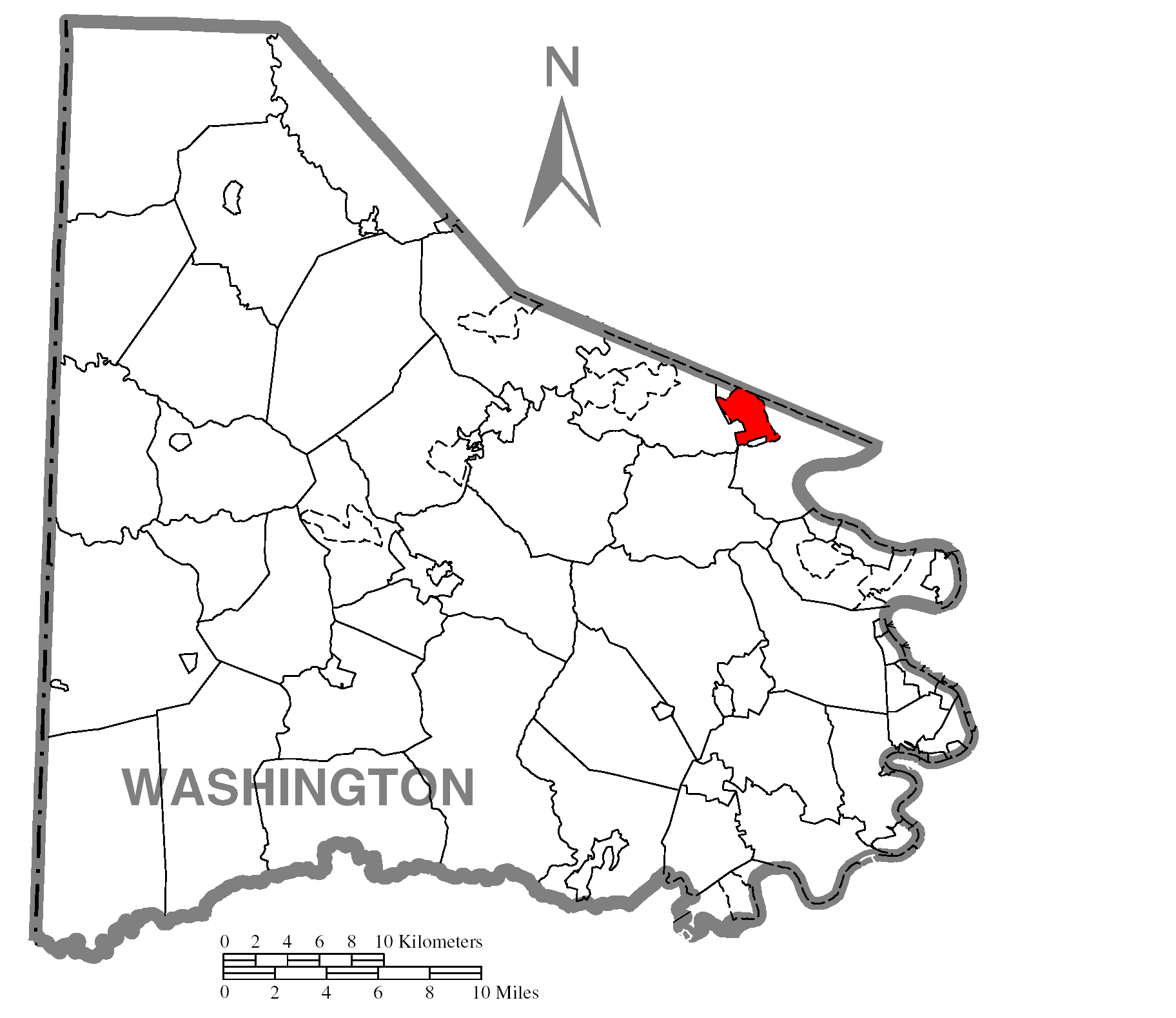
- Location of Gastonville in Washington County
- Coordinates: 40°15′37″N 80°0′9″W
- Country: United States
- State: Pennsylvania
- County: Washington

Area
  - Total: 2.73 sq mi (7.07 km^{2})
  - Land: 2.73 sq mi (7.07 km^{2})
  - Water: 0 sq mi (0.00 km^{2})

Population (2020)
  - Total: 2,554
  - Density: 936.2/sq mi (361.47/km^{2})
- Time zone: UTC-4 (EST)
  - Summer (DST): UTC-5 (EDT)
- ZIP code: 15332
- Area code: 724
- FIPS code: 42-28600

Gastonville is a census-designated place (CDP) in Union Township, Washington County, Pennsylvania, United States. The population was 2,818 at the 2010 census.

== Geography ==
Gastonville is located at 40°15′37″N 80°0′9″W (40.260329, -80.002477).

According to the United States Census Bureau, the CDP has a total area of 2.8 square miles (7.3 km^{2}), all of it land.

== Demographics ==
Historical population
| Census | Pop. | Note | %± |
|---|---|---|---|
| 2000 | 3,002 | | — |
| 2010 | 2,818 | | −6.1% |
| 2020 | 2,554 | | −9.4% |
U.S. Decennial Census

At the 2000 census there were 3,002 people, 1,246 households, and 899 families living in the CDP. The population density was 1,091.1 people per square mile (421.3 people/km^{2}). There were 1,269 housing units at an average density of 461.2 per square mile (178.1/km^{2}). The racial makeup of the CDP was 98.23% White, 0.77% African American, 0.03% Native American, 0.17% Asian, 0.33% from other races, and 0.47% from two or more races. Hispanic or Latino of any race were 0.97%.

Of the 1,246 households 27.4% had children under the age of 18 living with them, 57.1% were married couples living together, 12.2% had a female householder with no husband present, and 27.8% were non-families. 24.6% of households were one person and 12.5% were one person aged 65 or older. The average household size was 2.40 and the average family size was 2.84.

The age distribution was 20.5% under the age of 18, 5.8% from 18 to 24, 28.3% from 25 to 44, 26.6% from 45 to 64, and 18.7% 65 or older. The median age was 42 years. For every 100 females, there were 90.7 males. For every 100 females age 18 and over, there were 86.6 males.

The median household income was $42,270 and the median family income was $53,841. Males had a median income of $41,657 versus $23,148 for females. The per capita income for the CDP was $20,696. About 3.8% of families and 5.8% of the population were below the poverty line, including 8.3% of those under age 18 and 7.4% of those age 65 or over.

== Education ==
It is in the Ringgold School District.
