= West Alexander Historic District =

Historic district in Pennsylvania, United States

- U.S. National Register of Historic Places
- U.S. Historic district
- Washington County History & Landmarks Foundation Landmark
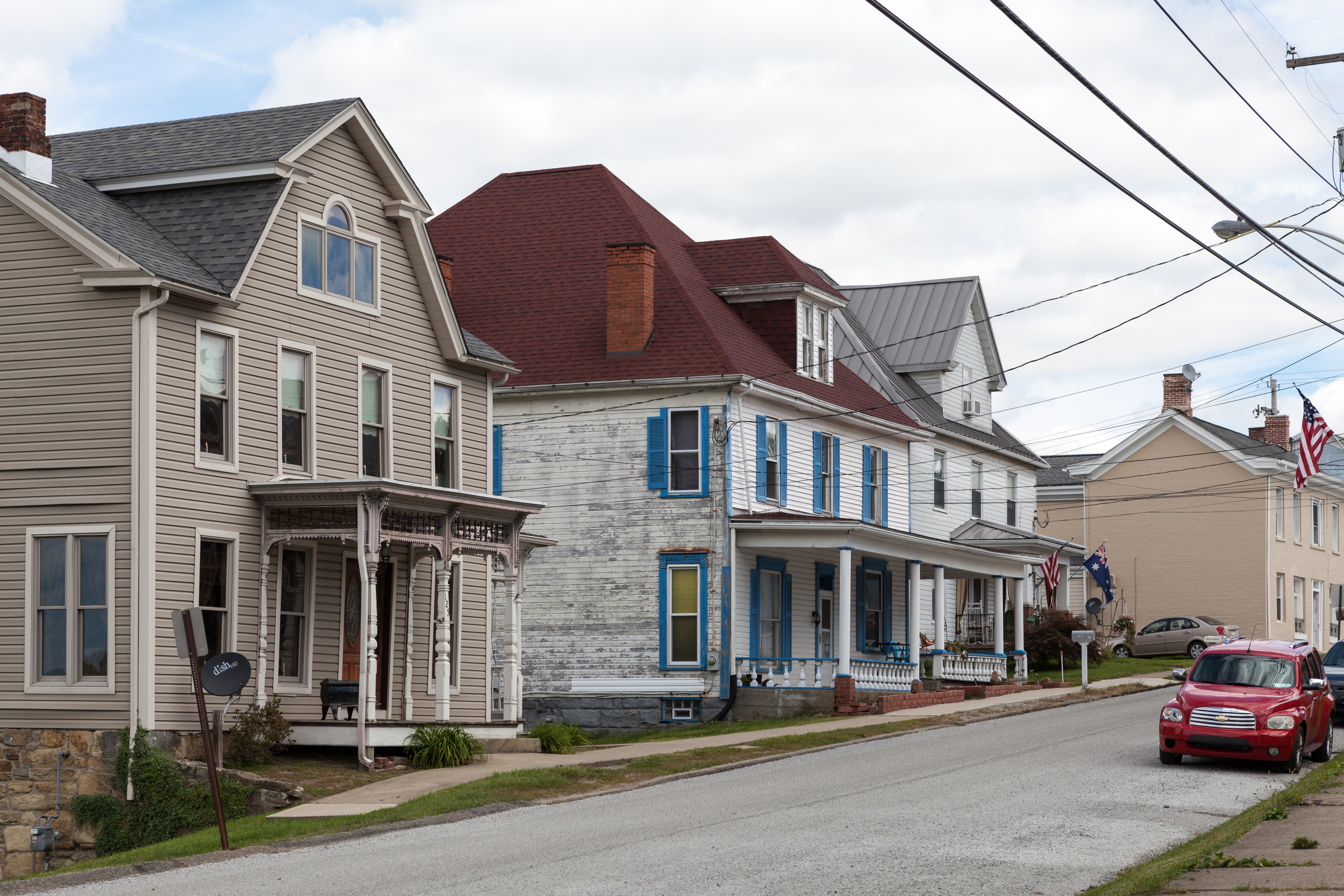
- Houses near 125 Main St, looking east

- Location within Pennsylvania Location within the United States
- Location: Roughly bounded by Main, N. Liberty and Mechanic Sts., West Alexander, Pennsylvania
- Coordinates: 40°6′15″N 80°30′37″W
- Area: 20 acres (8.1 ha)
- Architect: Multiple
- Architectural style: Greek Revival, Italianate
- NRHP reference No.: 85000471
- Added to NRHP: March 07, 1985

West Alexander Historic District is a historic district in West Alexander, Pennsylvania.

It is designated as a historic district by the Washington County History & Landmarks Foundation.
