= Margaret Derrow House =

Historic house in Pennsylvania, United States

- U.S. National Register of Historic Places
- Washington County History & Landmarks Foundation Landmark
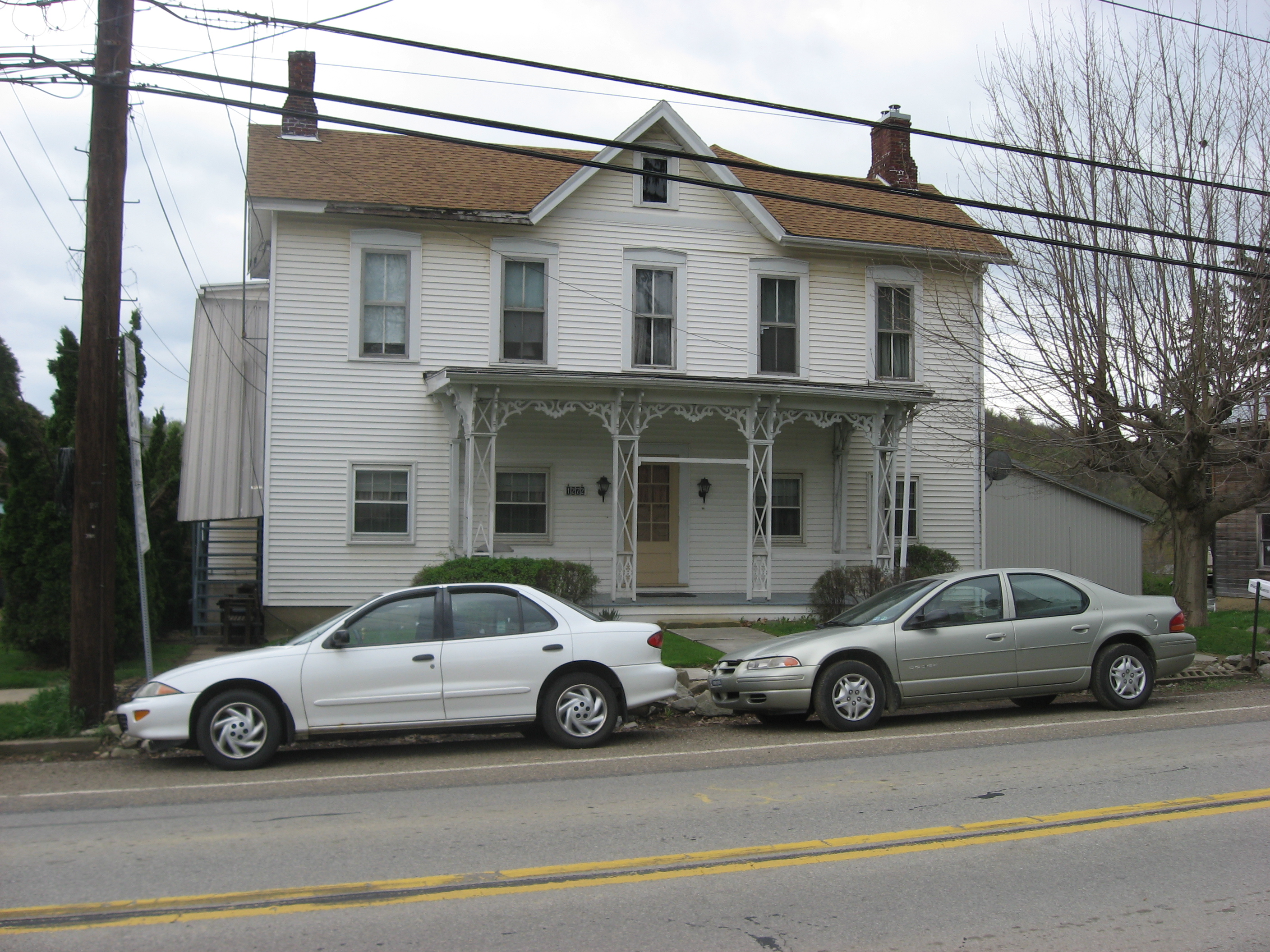
- Margaret Derrow in 2010

- Location within Pennsylvania Location within the United States
- Location: W. Main St., Claysville, Pennsylvania
- Coordinates: 40°6′56″N 80°24′59″W
- Area: 1 acre (0.40 ha)
- Built: 1855
- Architectural style: Gothic Revival
- NRHP reference No.: 74001808
- Added to NRHP: November 05, 1974

Margaret Derrow House is a historic building in Claysville, Pennsylvania.

It is designated as a historic residential landmark/farmstead by the Washington County History & Landmarks Foundation.
