= Sprowl's Covered Bridge =

- Sprowls Covered Bridge
- U.S. National Register of Historic Places
- Washington County History & Landmarks Foundation Landmark
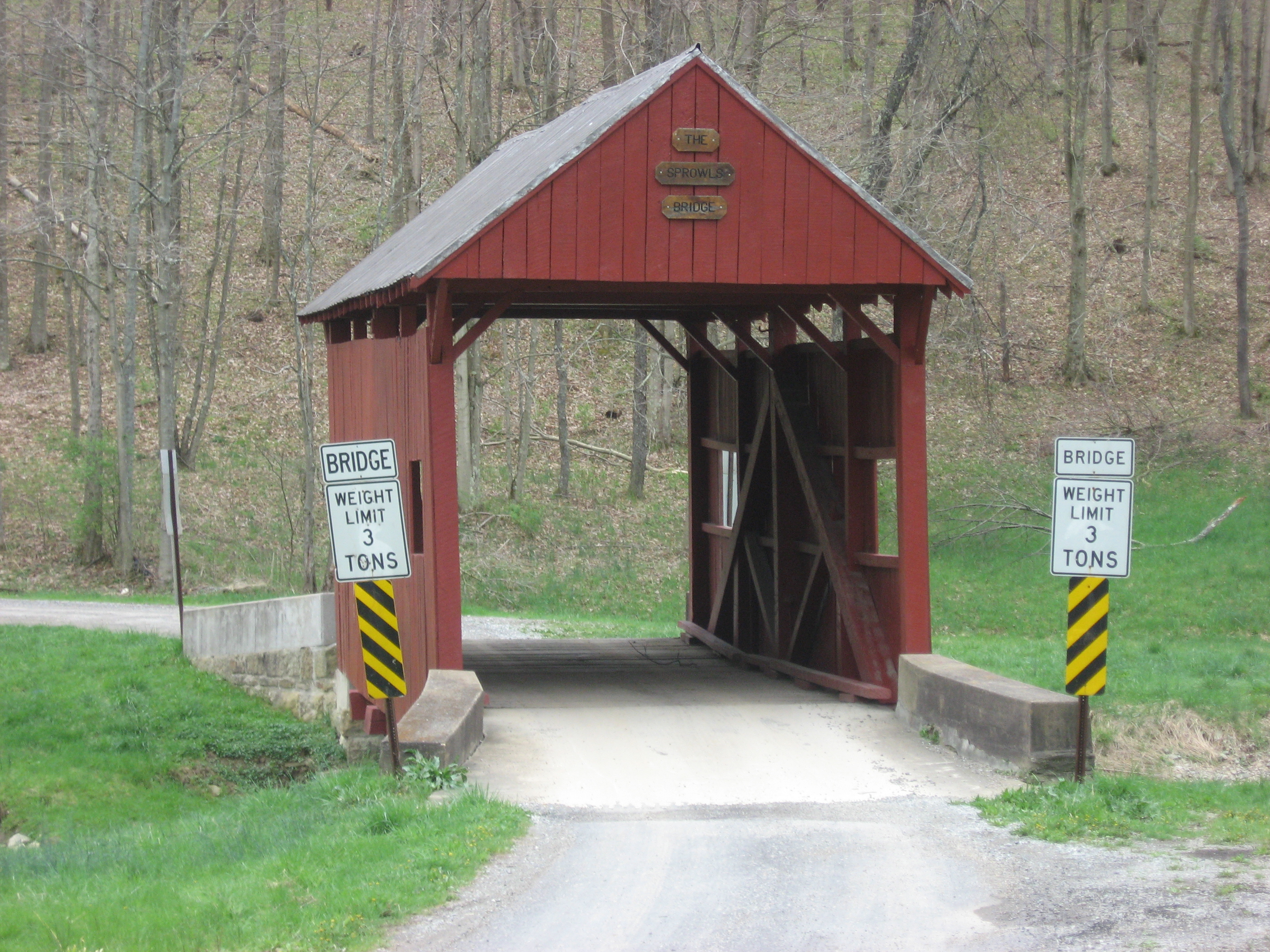
- Sprowls Covered Bridge in 2010

- Location within Pennsylvania Location within the United States
- Nearest city: West Finley, Pennsylvania
- Coordinates: 40°0′39″N 80°24′25″W
- Area: 0.1 acres (0.040 ha)
- Built: 1875
- Architectural style: Kingpost truss
- MPS: Covered Bridges of Washington and Greene Counties TR
- NRHP reference No.: 79002365
- Added to NRHP: June 22, 1979

The Sprowls Covered Bridge is a historic covered bridge in West Finley, Pennsylvania.

It is designated as a historic bridge by the Washington County History & Landmarks Foundation.
