= Paris, Pennsylvania =

Unincorporated community in Pennsylvania, US

- Census-designated place
- Location within the U.S. state of Pennsylvania Paris, Pennsylvania (the United States)
- Coordinates: 40°24′12″N 80°30′45″W
- Country: United States
- State: Pennsylvania
- County: Washington

Area
  - Total: 2.11 sq mi (5.47 km^{2})
  - Land: 2.11 sq mi (5.47 km^{2})
  - Water: 0 sq mi (0.00 km^{2})

Population (2020)
  - Total: 667
  - Density: 316.0/sq mi (121.99/km^{2})
- Time zone: UTC-5 (Eastern (EST))
  - Summer (DST): UTC-4 (EDT)
- ZIP codes: 15021
- FIPS code: 42-57928

Paris is a census-designated place in Hanover Township, Washington County, Pennsylvania, United States. Although it is not tracked by the United States Census Bureau, Paris has been assigned the ZIP code 15021. As of the 2020 census the population was 842 residents.

The community is located just north of U.S. Route 22 near the Pennsylvania/West Virginia border.

== Education ==
It is in the Burgettstown Area School District.
