= West Alexander, Pennsylvania =

Unincorporated community in Pennsylvania, US

West Alexander
- Census-designated place
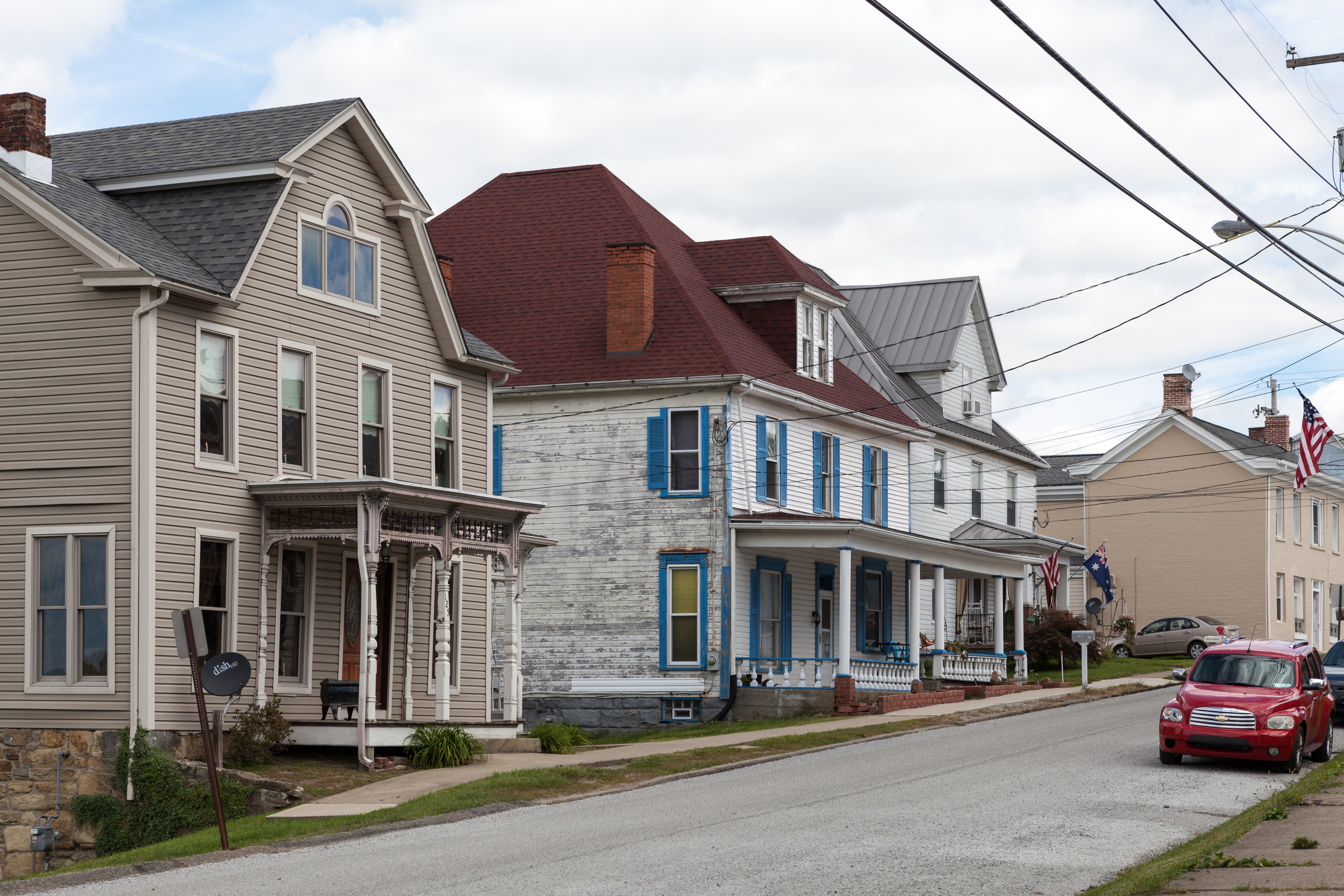
- Main Street

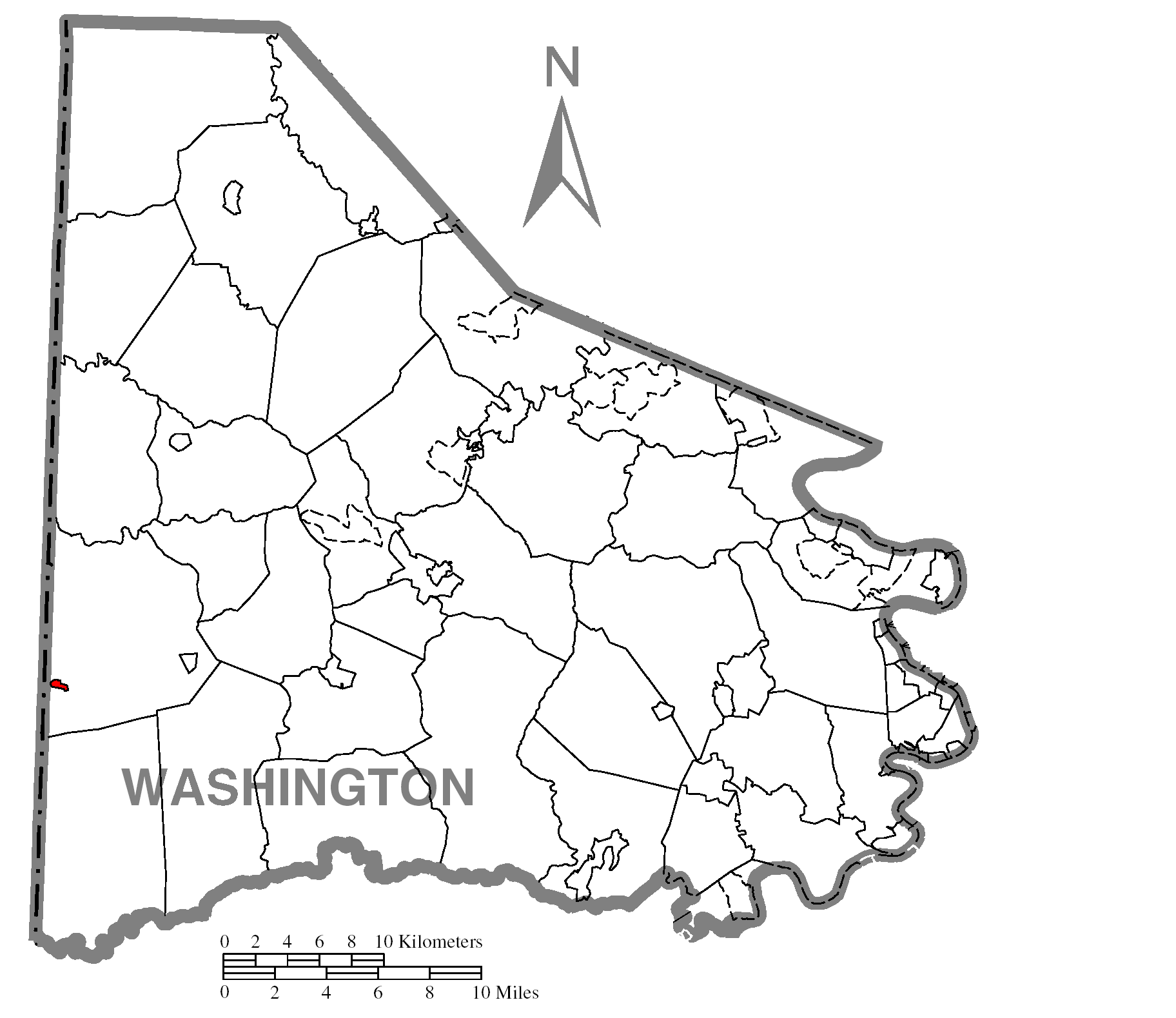
- Location of West Alexander in Washington County

- Location of West Alexander in Pennsylvania
- Coordinates: 40°6′15″N 80°30′28″W
- Country: United States
- State: Pennsylvania
- County: Washington
- Established: 1796

Area
  - Total: 0.2 sq mi (0.52 km^{2})

Population (2010)
  - Total: 604
  - Density: 3,000/sq mi (1,200/km^{2})
- Time zone: UTC-4 (EST)
  - Summer (DST): UTC-5 (EDT)
- Area code: 724

West Alexander is a census-designated place in Donegal Township, Washington County, Pennsylvania, and formerly a borough in Washington County. Located less than a mile east of the border with West Virginia, the population was 604 at the 2010 census, just short of double the population of 320 recorded in the 2000 Census. The borough was dissolved into surrounding Donegal Township, effective January 1, 2009.

== Geography ==
West Alexander is located right on the border of West Virginia.

According to the United States Census Bureau, the borough had a total area of 0.2 square miles (0.52 km^{2}), all of it land.

== Demographics ==
As of the census of 2000, there were 320 people, 116 households, and 83 families residing in the borough. The population density was 2,033.5 inhabitants per square mile (785.1/km^{2}). There were 125 housing units at an average density of 794.3 per square mile (306.7/km^{2}). The racial makeup of the borough was 97.81% White, 1.56% African American, and 0.62% from two or more races. Hispanic or Latino of any race were 0.94% of the population.

There were 116 households, out of which 34.5% had children under the age of 18 living with them, 56.9% were married couples living together, 12.9% had a female householder with no husband present, and 28.4% were non-families. 25.9% of all households were made up of individuals, and 15.5% had someone living alone who was 65 years of age or older. The average household size was 2.61 and the average family size was 3.16.

In the borough the population was spread out, with 29.7% under the age of 18, 4.4% from 18 to 24, 30.3% from 25 to 44, 19.4% from 45 to 64, and 16.3% who were 65 years of age or older. The median age was 35 years. For every 100 females, there were 81.8 males. For every 100 females age 18 and over, there were 78.6 males.

The median income for a household in the borough was $26,563, and the median income for a family was $30,625. Males had a median income of $29,271 versus $21,364 for females. The per capita income for the borough was $13,815. About 6.1% of families and 17.8% of the population were below the poverty line, including 21.8% of those under age 18 and 29.2% of those age 65 or over.

== Dissolution ==
Though the borough had a successful commerce center based on antique and gift shops in its National Register of Historic Places-listed historic district, a fire in 1990 destroyed several of those businesses and closed others. The town never completely recovered. The fire, combined with a $3.2 million debt for a sewage treatment plant, forced residents to consider a merger with Donegal Township, which was completed in 2009.

== Transportation and Infrastructure ==
West Alexander is located directly in between U.S. Route 40 (sometimes known as the National Road) and Interstate 70 between the Pittsburgh and Wheeling city centers. Within Interstate 70 in Pennsylvania, West Alexander is served by Exit 1.

In the centre of West Alexander is a US Post Office, a volunteer fire department, and an elementary school, all bearing the name of West Alexander. Liberty Street acts as the main north to south road within the center of West Alexander and connects to the National Road.

Air transport in West Alexander is sparse but accessible outside of the city. General aviation is primarily accessible through either Wheeling Ohio County Airport or Washington County Airport. The closest commercial service is located at Pittsburgh International Airport.

== Education ==
It is in the McGuffey School District.
