= National Register of Historic Places listings in Washington County, Pennsylvania =

Location of Washington County in Pennsylvania

This is a list of the National Register of Historic Places listings in Washington County, Pennsylvania.

This is intended to be a complete list of the properties and districts on the National Register of Historic Places in Washington County, Pennsylvania, United States. The locations of National Register properties and districts for which the latitude and longitude coordinates are included below, may be seen in a map.

There are 99 properties and districts listed on the National Register in the county. Four sites are further designated as National Historic Landmarks.

This National Park Service list is complete through NPS recent listings posted September 4, 2026.

== Current listings ==
	Name on the Register	Image	Date listed	Location	City or town	Description
1	Edward G. Acheson House	Edward G. Acheson House	May 11, 1976 (#76001679)	908 Main Street; 40°12′19″N 79°55′59″W	Monongahela	
2	Administration Building, Washington and Jefferson College	Administration Building, Washington and Jefferson College	August 16, 1977 (#77001199)	Washington & Jefferson College campus 40°10′13″N 80°14′28″W	Washington	
3	Bailey Covered Bridge	Bailey Covered Bridge	June 22, 1979 (#79002355)	Bailey Road spanning Ten Mile Creek, southeast of Prosperity; 40°01′14″N 80°11′45″W	Amwell Township	
4	Beallsville Historic District	Beallsville Historic District	October 24, 1996 (#96001205)	Roughly, Main Street, Chestnut Alley, and South Alley between West Alley and Oak Alley; 40°03′54″N 80°01′23″W	Beallsville	
5	Bethel African Methodist Episcopal Church of Monongahela City	Bethel African Methodist Episcopal Church of Monongahela City	November 7, 2002 (#02001298)	Junction of 7th and Main Streets; 40°12′19″N 79°55′52″W	Monongahela	
6	David Bradford House	David Bradford House	July 16, 1973 (#73001668)	175 South Main Street; 40°10′05″N 80°14′42″W	Washington	
7	Samuel Brownlee House	Samuel Brownlee House	November 7, 1976 (#76001678)	North of Eighty-Four on Pennsylvania Route 519; 40°12′24″N 80°07′41″W	North Strabane Township	
8	Scott Brownlee Covered Bridge	Scott Brownlee Covered Bridge	June 22, 1979 (#79002360)	Off Pennsylvania Route 231; 40°02′38″N 80°23′53″W	East Finley Township	
9	Brownsville Bridge	Brownsville Bridge	June 22, 1988 (#88000834)	State Route 4025 over the Monongahela River; 40°01′20″N 79°53′26″W	West Brownsville	Extends into Fayette County
10	Caldwell Tavern	Caldwell Tavern	February 16, 1996 (#96000087)	Junction of U.S. Route 40 and Township Route 474, northeast of Claysville; 40°08′21″N 80°21′36″W	Buffalo Township	
11	Canonsburg Armory	Canonsburg Armory	December 22, 1989 (#89002070)	West College Street and North Central Avenue; 40°15′37″N 80°11′14″W	Canonsburg	
12	Cement City Historic District	Cement City Historic District	February 16, 1996 (#96000023)	Roughly Chestnut and Walnut Streets from Modisette Avenue to Bertha Avenue and along Ida and Bertha Streets; 40°10′15″N 79°51′56″W	Donora	
13	Centerville Historic District	Centerville Historic District	October 24, 1996 (#96001208)	Roughly Old National Pike from Linton Road to its junction with Pennsylvania Route 481; 40°02′42″N 79°58′35″W	Centerville	
14	Charleroi Historic District	Charleroi Historic District	November 9, 2007 (#07001162)	Roughly bounded by 1st and 13th Streets, Oakland Avenue, and the former Pennsylvania Railroad tracks 40°08′N 79°54′W	Charleroi	
15	Charleroi-Monessen Bridge	Charleroi-Monessen Bridge	June 22, 1988 (#88000812)	State Route 2018 over the Monongahela River; 40°09′06″N 79°54′15″W	North Charleroi	Extends into Monessen in Westmoreland County
16	Crawford Covered Bridge	Crawford Covered Bridge	June 22, 1979 (#79002361)	Crawford Road spanning Robinson Fork Wheeling Creek; 39°59′56″N 80°28′21″W	West Finley Township	
17	Dager-Wonsettler Farmstead	Dager-Wonsettler Farmstead	November 21, 2003 (#03001192)	1044 National Park, 0.5 miles (0.80 km) northwest of the junction of Pennsylvania Route 519 and U.S. Route 40; 40°07′49″N 80°08′51″W	Amwell Township	
18	Danley Covered Bridge	Danley Covered Bridge	June 22, 1979 (#79002362)	Dogwood Hill Road spanning Robinson Fork Wheeling Creek; 40°03′18″N 80°26′22″W	West Finley Township	
19	Horn Davis Overholtzer Bridge	Horn Davis Overholtzer Bridge	June 22, 1979 (#79002354)	Spanning Ten Mile Creek southeast of Fairfield; 40°00′29″N 80°03′45″W	West Bethlehem Township	The bridge collapsed in 1994. It extended into Morgan Township in Greene County
20	Day Covered Bridge	Day Covered Bridge	June 22, 1979 (#79002356)	Covered Bridge Road spanning Short Creek, south of Prosperity; 40°01′46″N 80°17′35″W	Morris Township	
21	Margaret Derrow House	Margaret Derrow House	November 5, 1974 (#74001808)	West Main Street, west of the Claysville borough limits 40°06′56″N 80°24′59″W	Donegal Township	
22	Devil's Den, McClurg Covered Bridge	Devil's Den, McClurg Covered Bridge	June 22, 1979 (#79003828)	Hanover Township park 40°25′29″N 80°26′48″W	Hanover Township	Moved from original location along King's Creek to Hanover Township park in 1987
23	Doak-Little House	Doak-Little House	April 15, 1996 (#96001211)	U.S. Route 40 0.5 miles (0.80 km) west of South Strabane; 40°08′34″N 80°10′26″W	South Strabane Township	
24	Joseph Dorsey House	Joseph Dorsey House	November 19, 1974 (#74001814)	113 Cherry Avenue, west of West Brownsville; 40°01′14″N 79°55′24″W	Centerville	
25	Dusmal House	Dusmal House	February 24, 1975 (#75001675)	East of Gastonville off Gilmore Road; 40°15′10″N 79°57′55″W	Union Township	
26	East Washington Historic District	East Washington Historic District	November 15, 1984 (#84000547)	Roughly bounded by North, East, and Wade Avenues and Wheeling, Beau, and Chestnut Streets; 40°10′18″N 80°14′04″W	East Washington	
27	Ebenezer Covered Bridge	Ebenezer Covered Bridge	June 22, 1979 (#79003829)	Mingo Creek County Park spanning Mingo Creek; 40°11′28″N 80°02′28″W	Nottingham Township	Moved from original location spanning South Fork Maple Creek at Ginger Hill in 1977
28	Erskine Covered Bridge	Erskine Covered Bridge	June 22, 1979 (#79002359)	Erskine Road spanning Middle Wheeling Creek, south of West Alexander; 40°03′59″N 80°30′59″W	West Finley Township	
29	First National Bank of Charleroi	First National Bank of Charleroi	February 7, 2007 (#07000032)	210 Fifth Street; 40°08′25″N 79°53′52″W	Charleroi	
30	Molly Fleming House	Molly Fleming House	May 30, 1997 (#97000519)	616 Wood Street; 40°03′48″N 79°53′28″W	California	
31	Philip Friend House	Philip Friend House	November 12, 1998 (#98001371)	105 Little Daniels Run Road; 40°04′14″N 80°07′31″W	North Bethlehem Township	
32	Harrison House	Harrison House	December 30, 1974 (#74001807)	Old Route 40; 40°02′19″N 79°57′12″W	Centerville	The house no longer exists
33	Hawthorne School	Hawthorne School	May 8, 1986 (#86001028)	Hawthorne and Bluff Streets; 40°15′38″N 80°11′47″W	Canonsburg	
34	Henry Covered Bridge	Henry Covered Bridge	June 22, 1979 (#79002353)	Mansion Hill Road spanning Mingo Creek, west of Monongahela; 40°12′08″N 80°01′01″W	Nottingham Township	
35	Hill's Tavern	Hill's Tavern	November 19, 1974 (#74001811)	U.S. Route 40 in Scenery Hill; 40°05′08″N 80°04′11″W	North Bethlehem Township	Heavily damaged by fire on August 17–18, 2015, interior gutted.
36	Huffman Distillery and Chopping Mill	Huffman Distillery and Chopping Mill	November 12, 1992 (#92001499)	Caldwell Road, 2 miles (3.2 km) north of the junction with Pennsylvania Route 917, north of Cokeburg; 40°07′21″N 80°03′59″W	Somerset Township	
37	Hughes Covered Bridge	Hughes Covered Bridge	June 22, 1979 (#79002357)	Spans Ten Mile Creek, southeast of Prosperity; 40°01′59″N 80°09′37″W	Amwell Township	
38	Jackson's Mill Covered Bridge	Jackson's Mill Covered Bridge	June 22, 1979 (#79003830)	Kings Creek Road spanning Kings Creek, northwest of Burgettstown; 40°25′26″N 80°29′21″W	Hanover Township	
39	Jennings-Gallagher House	Jennings-Gallagher House	March 28, 1996 (#96000318)	429 Wood Street; 40°03′52″N 79°53′26″W	California	
40	Kinder's Mill	Kinder's Mill	October 16, 1986 (#86002888)	State Route 2011 at Piper Road; 40°01′51″N 80°03′18″W	Deemston	
41	Krepps Covered Bridge	Krepps Covered Bridge	June 22, 1979 (#79002352)	Covered Bridge Road, southeast of Cherry Valley and southwest of Midway; 40°20′26″N 80°19′53″W	Mount Pleasant Township	
42	Leatherman Covered Bridge	Leatherman Covered Bridge	June 22, 1979 (#79002351)	Leatherman Bridge Road, north of Cokeburg; 40°06′33″N 80°04′18″W	North Bethlehem Township	
43	LeMoyne Crematory	LeMoyne Crematory	February 16, 1996 (#96000078)	Northwestern corner of the junction of Redstone Road and Elm Street, southeast of Washington; 40°09′38″N 80°14′16″W	North Franklin Township	
44	F. Julius LeMoyne House	F. Julius LeMoyne House	September 25, 1997 (#97001271)	49 East Maiden Street; 40°10′05″N 80°14′36″W	Washington	
45	Moses Little Tavern	Moses Little Tavern	February 16, 1996 (#96000088)	438 East National Pike, southeast of Laboratory; 40°08′58″N 80°11′19″W	Amwell Township	
46	David Longwell House	David Longwell House	August 2, 1993 (#93000718)	711 West Main Street; 40°12′19″N 79°55′53″W	Monongahela	
47	Lyle Covered Bridge	Lyle Covered Bridge	June 22, 1979 (#79003831)	Kramer Road spanning Brush Run, north of Raccoon; 40°27′15″N 80°22′32″W	Hanover Township	
48	Malden Inn	Malden Inn	January 24, 1974 (#74001805)	West of Blainsburg on U.S. Route 40; 40°02′15″N 79°55′50″W	California	
49	Marianna Historic District	Marianna Historic District	November 15, 1984 (#84000560)	Roughly bounded by Ten Mile Creek, Beeson Avenue Hill, and 6th and 7th Streets; 40°01′21″N 80°05′53″W	Marianna	
50	Martin Farmstead	Martin Farmstead	July 21, 1995 (#95000886)	Pennsylvania Route 136, 2 miles (3.2 km) west of Eighty-Four; 40°11′01″N 80°10′06″W	South Strabane Township	
51	Martin's Mill Covered Bridge	Martin's Mill Covered Bridge	June 22, 1979 (#79003825)	West of Marianna crossing Ten Mile Creek; 40°00′49″N 80°07′54″W	Amwell and West Bethlehem Townships	The bridge no longer exists.
52	Dr. Joseph Maurer House	Dr. Joseph Maurer House	December 30, 1993 (#93001470)	97 West Wheeling Street; 40°10′09″N 80°14′51″W	Washington	
53	Blaney Mays Covered Bridge	Blaney Mays Covered Bridge	June 22, 1979 (#79002350)	Waynesburg Road spanning Middle Wheeling Creek, southwest of Claysville; 40°05′17″N 80°29′15″W	Donegal Township	
54	Meadowcroft Rockshelter	Meadowcroft Rockshelter	November 21, 1978 (#78002480)	West of Avella; 40°17′11″N 80°29′30″W	Jefferson Township	
55	Longdon L. Miller Covered Bridge	Longdon L. Miller Covered Bridge	June 22, 1979 (#79002363)	Miller Creek Road spanning Templeton Fork Wheeling Creek, west of Enon; 39°58′41″N 80°26′47″W	West Finley Township	
56	Mingo Creek Presbyterian Church and Churchyard	Mingo Creek Presbyterian Church and Churchyard	November 12, 1992 (#92001500)	Junction of Pennsylvania Route 88 and Mingo Church Road, northwest of Courtney; 40°13′44″N 79°59′50″W	Union Township	
57	Monongahela Cemetery	Monongahela Cemetery	October 14, 2001 (#01001116)	Cemetery Hill Road at Gregg Street; 40°11′39″N 79°55′20″W	Monongahela	
58	Montgomery House	Montgomery House	October 25, 1974 (#74001809)	West Main Street; 40°06′57″N 80°24′58″W	Claysville	
59	Thomas Munce House	Thomas Munce House	June 28, 1996 (#96000710)	Pennsylvania Route 136, 3 miles (4.8 km) east of Washington; 40°11′13″N 80°10′48″W	South Strabane Township	
60	John H. Nelson House	John H. Nelson House	May 5, 2000 (#00000452)	104 Colvin Road; 40°08′04″N 79°57′28″W	Fallowfield Township	
61	Nesbit-Walker Farm	Nesbit-Walker Farm	February 2, 2016 (#15001033)	173 Mulberry Hill; 40°14′26″N 80°18′08″W	Canton Township	
62	Old Main, California State College	Old Main, California State College	May 2, 1974 (#74001806)	California University of Pennsylvania campus 40°03′57″N 79°53′08″W	California	
63	Robert Parkinson Farm	Robert Parkinson Farm	July 15, 2002 (#01000603)	Pennsylvania Route 18, 0.4 miles (0.64 km) north of Old Concord; 40°00′44″N 80°20′00″W	Morris Township	
64	Pennsylvania Railroad Freight Station	Pennsylvania Railroad Freight Station	July 21, 1995 (#95000891)	111 Washington Street; 40°10′20″N 80°15′15″W	Washington	
65	Pennsylvania Railroad Passenger Station	Pennsylvania Railroad Passenger Station	June 19, 1979 (#79002349)	100 Wood Street; 40°04′05″N 79°53′21″W	California	
66	Pine Bank Covered Bridge	Pine Bank Covered Bridge	June 22, 1979 (#79003824)	Meadowcroft Rockshelter and Museum of Rural Life, southwest of Studa crossing a ravine 40°17′20″N 80°29′27″W	Jefferson Township	
67	Plant's Covered Bridge	Plant's Covered Bridge	June 22, 1979 (#79002364)	Skyview Road spanning Templeton Fork Wheeling Creek; 40°01′16″N 80°24′58″W	East Finley Township	
68	Plantation Plenty	Plantation Plenty	June 21, 1975 (#75001673)	2 miles (3.2 km) south of Avella on Pennsylvania Route 231; 40°15′17″N 80°27′40″W	Independence Township	Boundary increase and renaming, February 2, 2016.
69	Ralston Freeman Covered Bridge	Ralston Freeman Covered Bridge	June 22, 1979 (#79003827)	North of Paris crossing Aunt Clara's Fork of King's Creek; 40°26′49″N 80°30′26″W	Hanover Township	
70	Regester Log House	Regester Log House	October 16, 1974 (#74001810)	North of Fredericktown off Pennsylvania Route 88; 40°00′42″N 79°59′45″W	East Bethlehem Township	
71	Ringland Tavern	Ringland Tavern	February 16, 1996 (#96000091)	U.S. Route 40 in Scenery Hill; 40°05′03″N 80°04′06″W	North Bethlehem Township	
72	Roberts House	Roberts House	April 10, 1975 (#75001674)	225 North Central Avenue; 40°15′40″N 80°11′15″W	Canonsburg	
73	Frank L. Ross Farm	Frank L. Ross Farm	March 20, 2002 (#02000226)	Pennsylvania Route 519, 0.3 miles (0.48 km) north of U.S. Route 40; 40°07′56″N 80°08′01″W	North Bethlehem and South Strabane Townships	
74	"S" Bridge	"S" Bridge	April 4, 1975 (#75001676)	U.S. Route 40 at Pennsylvania Route 221, 6 miles (9.7 km) west of Washington; 40°08′22″N 80°21′00″W	Buffalo Township	
75	Sawhill Covered Bridge	Sawhill Covered Bridge	June 22, 1979 (#79002358)	Off Pennsylvania Route 221, northwest of Taylorstown; 40°10′48″N 80°24′59″W	Blaine Township	
76	Scenery Hill Historic District	Scenery Hill Historic District	October 24, 1996 (#96001198)	Roughly National Pike East/U.S. Route 40 between Scenery Hill Cemetery and Kinder Road in Scenery Hill; 40°05′08″N 80°04′17″W	North Bethlehem Township	
77	David Slusher Farm	David Slusher Farm	February 2, 2016 (#15001035)	546 Lone Pine Rd. 40°04′36″N 80°10′42″W	Amwell Township	
78	Sprowl's Covered Bridge	Sprowl's Covered Bridge	June 22, 1979 (#79002365)	Off Pennsylvania Route 231; 40°00′39″N 80°24′25″W	East Finley Township	
79	Stephenson-Campbell House	Stephenson-Campbell House	August 22, 2002 (#02000891)	At the end of Tomahawk Claim Lane, off Reissing Road; 40°20′31″N 80°11′43″W	Cecil Township	
80	Taylorstown Historic District	Taylorstown Historic District	September 5, 1985 (#85001958)	Main Street in Taylorstown; 40°09′35″N 80°22′45″W	Blaine Township	
81	James Thome Farm	James Thome Farm	April 11, 1997 (#97000292)	213 Linnwood Road, northwest of Eighty Four; 40°11′53″N 80°09′30″W	North Strabane Township	
82	Trinity Hall	Trinity Hall	September 27, 1976 (#76001681)	1 mile (1.6 km) south of Washington on Pennsylvania Route 18; 40°09′53″N 80°14′56″W	North Franklin Township	
83	Ulery Mill	Ulery Mill	April 20, 1978 (#78002481)	Southeast of Marianna; 40°00′40″N 80°04′32″W	West Bethlehem Township	Demolished
84	US Post Office-Charleroi	US Post Office-Charleroi	January 4, 1990 (#89002287)	638 Fallowfield Avenue; 40°08′24″N 79°54′02″W	Charleroi	
85	Washington Armory	Washington Armory	May 9, 1991 (#91000520)	76 West Maiden Street; 40°10′02″N 80°14′47″W	Washington	
86	Washington Commercial Historic District		May 6, 2021 (#100005206)	Roughly bounded by Spruce Ave., Park Ave., Shaffer Ave., Bownson Ave., and Franklin St. 40°10′17″N 80°14′44″W	Washington	
87	Washington County Courthouse	Washington County Courthouse	July 30, 1974 (#74001812)	South Main Street; 40°10′14″N 80°14′45″W	Washington	
88	Washington County Jail	Washington County Jail	July 30, 1974 (#74001813)	Cherry Street; 40°10′13″N 80°14′47″W	Washington	
89	Washington Trust Company Building	Washington Trust Company Building	January 7, 2015 (#14001133)	6 S. Main St. 40°10′15″N 80°14′43″W	Washington	
90	Webster Donora Bridge	Webster Donora Bridge	June 22, 1988 (#88000813)	State Route 1022 over the Monongahela River; 40°11′03″N 79°51′08″W	Donora	Extends into Rostraver Township in Westmoreland County
91	Welsh-Emery House	Welsh-Emery House	March 7, 1995 (#95000126)	114 Emery Road; 40°02′58″N 80°00′04″W	Centerville	
92	West Alexander Historic District	West Alexander Historic District	March 7, 1985 (#85000471)	Roughly bounded by Main, North Liberty, and Mechanic Streets in West Alexander; 40°06′15″N 80°30′37″W	Donegal Township	
93	West Middletown Historic District	West Middletown Historic District	August 8, 1985 (#85001740)	Main Street; 40°14′34″N 80°25′34″W	West Middletown	
94	John White House	John White House	November 12, 1998 (#98001370)	2151 North Main Street Extension; 40°12′28″N 80°15′25″W	Chartiers Township	
95	Wilson's Mill Covered Bridge	Wilson's Mill Covered Bridge	June 22, 1979 (#79003826)	Northeast of the junction of Pennsylvania Route 980 and Johns Avenue; 40°22′03″N 80°14′02″W	McDonald	Has been moved from its earlier location on Oakleaf Road over Cross Creek, southeast of Avella
96	Levi Wilson Tavern	Levi Wilson Tavern	April 15, 1996 (#96001210)	U.S. Route 40, 1.5 miles (2.4 km) east of the S Bridge; 40°09′00″N 80°19′44″W	Buffalo Township	
97	Cerl Wright Covered Bridge	Cerl Wright Covered Bridge	June 22, 1979 (#79003832)	Ridge Road, northwest of Bentleyville crossing North Fork of Pigeon Creek; 40°09′32″N 80°02′56″W	Somerset Township	
98	Enoch Wright House	Enoch Wright House	May 24, 2007 (#07000466)	815 Venetia Road; 40°14′59″N 80°01′44″W	Peters Township	
99	Wyit Sprowls Covered Bridge	Wyit Sprowls Covered Bridge	June 22, 1979 (#79002366)	East Finley Township park spanning Robinson Fork Wheeling Creek; 40°02′22″N 80°24′06″W	East Finley Township	Relocated to current location from West Finley Township approximately 1996

== Former listing ==
	Name on the Register	Image	Date listed	Date removed	Location	City or town	Description
1	Sackville House	Sackville House	November 21, 1976 (#76001680)	August 24, 2010	309 East Wheeling Street; 40°10′14″N 80°14′17″W	East Washington	Demolished circa 1980

== See also ==
- List of Pennsylvania state historical markers in Washington County
- Washington County History & Landmarks Foundation
