= North Bethlehem Township, Pennsylvania =

Township in Pennsylvania, US

Coordinates: 40°05′48″N 80°06′05″W

North Bethlehem Township
- Township
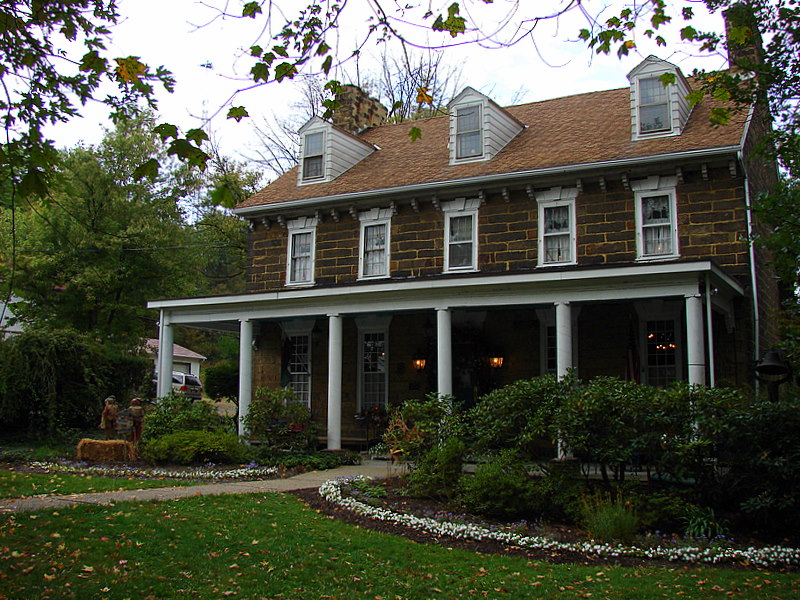
- Hill's Tavern (1794); National Register of Historic Places

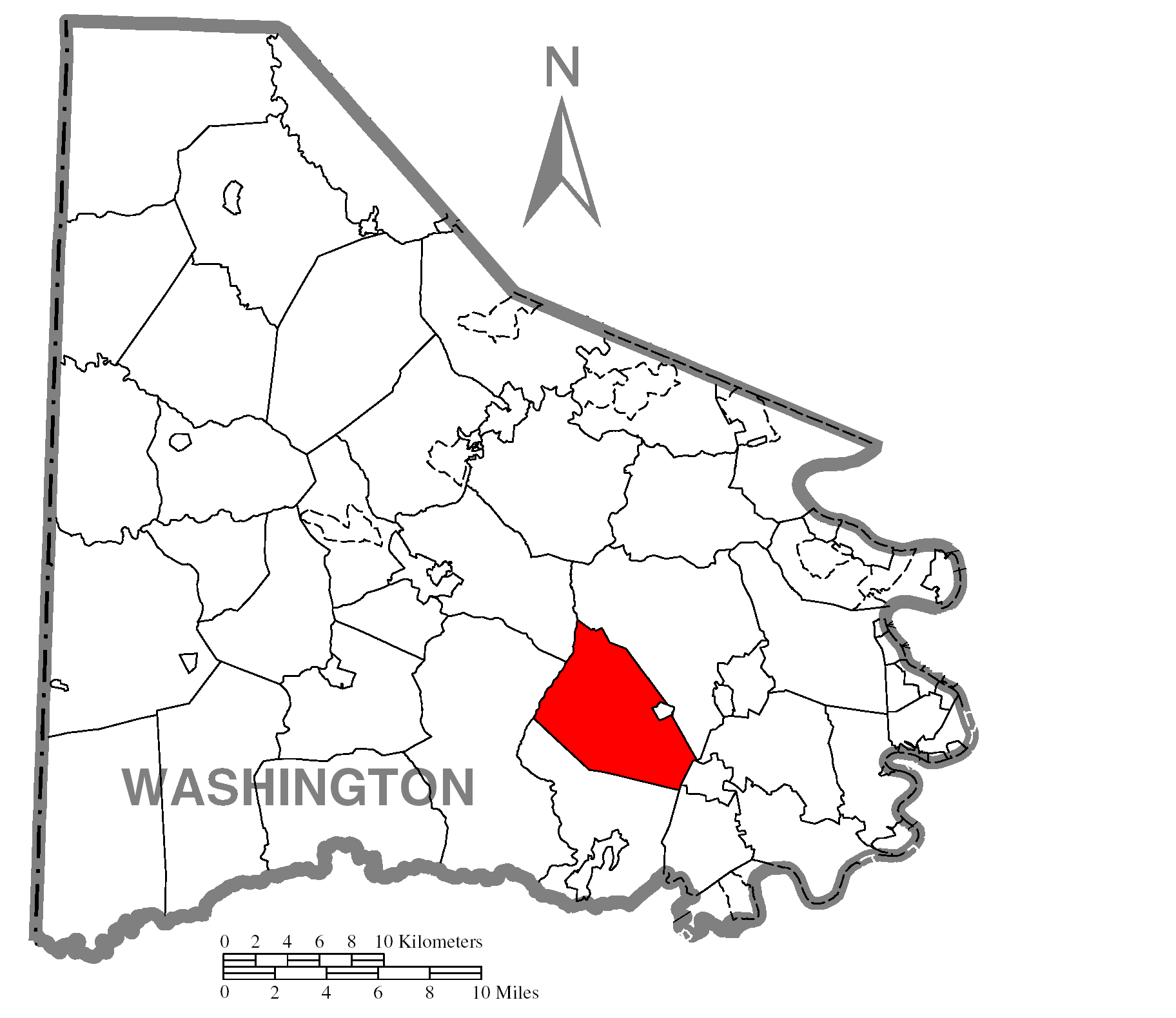
- Location of North Bethlehem Township in Washington County, Pennsylvania

- Location of Washington County in Pennsylvania
- Country: United States
- State: Pennsylvania
- County: Washington County

Area
  - Total: 22.08 sq mi (57.19 km^{2})
  - Land: 22.08 sq mi (57.19 km^{2})
  - Water: 0 sq mi (0.00 km^{2})

Population (2020)
  - Total: 1,548 ▼
  - Estimate (2021): 1,537
  - Density: 72.1/sq mi (27.82/km^{2})
- Time zone: UTC-4 (EST)
  - Summer (DST): UTC-5 (EDT)
- Area code: 724
- FIPS code: 42-125-54800

Historical population
| Census | Pop. | Note | %± |
|---|---|---|---|
| 2000 | 1,746 | | — |
| 2010 | 1,631 | | −6.6% |
| 2020 | 1,548 | | −5.1% |
| 2025 (est.) | 1,541 | | −0.5% |
U.S. Decennial Census

North Bethlehem Township is a township in Washington County, Pennsylvania, United States. The population was 1,548 at the 2020 census. The residents of the township are part of the Bentworth School District with schools located in nearby Bentleyville and Somerset Township.

== History ==
North Bethlehem Township was created from the northern portion of West Bethlehem Township in 1921.

The Frank L. Ross Farm, Philip Friend House, Hill's Tavern, now called The Century Inn, Leatherman Covered Bridge, Ringland Tavern, and Scenery Hill Historic District are listed on the National Register of Historic Places.

== Geography ==
According to the United States Census Bureau, the township has a total area of 22.2 square miles (57 km^{2}), all of it land.

== Surrounding neighborhoods ==
North Bethlehem Township has six borders, including Somerset Township from the northeast to the east-southeast with Cokeburg falling between in the mideast, Beallsville to the southeast, West Bethlehem Township to the south, Amwell Township to the west, and South Strabane Township to the northwest.

== Places ==
The most prominent place within the township is the area known as Scenery Hill.

The main route through the township and village is U.S. Route 40, also known as the National Road or "National Pike". This was the first east–west highway in the country. Every year, "Pike Days" (also called the "National Road Festival") are celebrated during a weekend in May. Scenery Hill is a major attraction along the pike during this celebration.

Other nearby places are Eighty Four (unincorporated) and Washington (city and county seat) as well as a number of other townships.

== Demographics ==
As of the census of 2000, there were 1,746 people, 661 households, and 506 families residing in the township. The population density was 78.6 people per square mile (30.3 people/km^{2}). There were 699 housing units at an average density of 31.5 per square mile (12.2/km^{2}). The racial makeup of the township was 99.37% White, 0.11% African American, 0.23% Asian, 0.11% from other races, and 0.17% from two or more races. Hispanic or Latino of any race were 0.11% of the population.

There were 661 households, out of which 31.5% had children under the age of 18 living with them, 62.8% were married couples living together, 8.8% had a female householder with no husband present, and 23.4% were non-families. 19.8% of all households were made up of individuals, and 8.8% had someone living alone who was 65 years of age or older. The average household size was 2.64 and the average family size was 3.05.

In the township the population was spread out, with 23.3% under the age of 18, 8.2% from 18 to 24, 29.1% from 25 to 44, 25.3% from 45 to 64, and 14.1% who were 65 years of age or older. The median age was 39 years. For every 100 females, there were 99.1 males. For every 100 females age 18 and over, there were 95.6 males.

The median income for a household in the township was $41,250, and the median income for a family was $46,250. Males had a median income of $37,250 versus $23,214 for females. The per capita income for the township was $20,399. About 6.5% of families and 8.0% of the population were below the poverty line, including 7.9% of those under age 18 and 5.5% of those age 65 or over.
