= Hawthorne School =

Hawthorne School may refer to:

- Hawthorne School (Brunswick, Maine), former school building in Brunswick, Maine
- Hawthorne School (Canonsburg, Pennsylvania)
