= Amity, Washington County, Pennsylvania =

Unincorporated community in Pennsylvania, US

Amity, Pennsylvania
- Unincorporated community
- Location within Pennsylvania Location within the United States
- Coordinates: 40°02′22″N 80°12′18″W
- Country: United States
- State: Pennsylvania
- County: Washington
- Time zone: UTC-5 (Eastern (EST))
  - Summer (DST): UTC-4 (EDT)
- ZIP code: 15311
- Area code: 724

Amity is an unincorporated community in Amwell Township, Pennsylvania, United States. It is home to the Bailey Covered Bridge and Hughes Covered Bridge.

== History ==
Amity was laid out in 1797, and named after the local Amity Presbyterian Church.

== Notable residents ==
- Abel McFarland, State Senator (1811–1818)
