= Laboratory, Pennsylvania =

Unincorporated community in Pennsylvania, US

- Unincorporated community
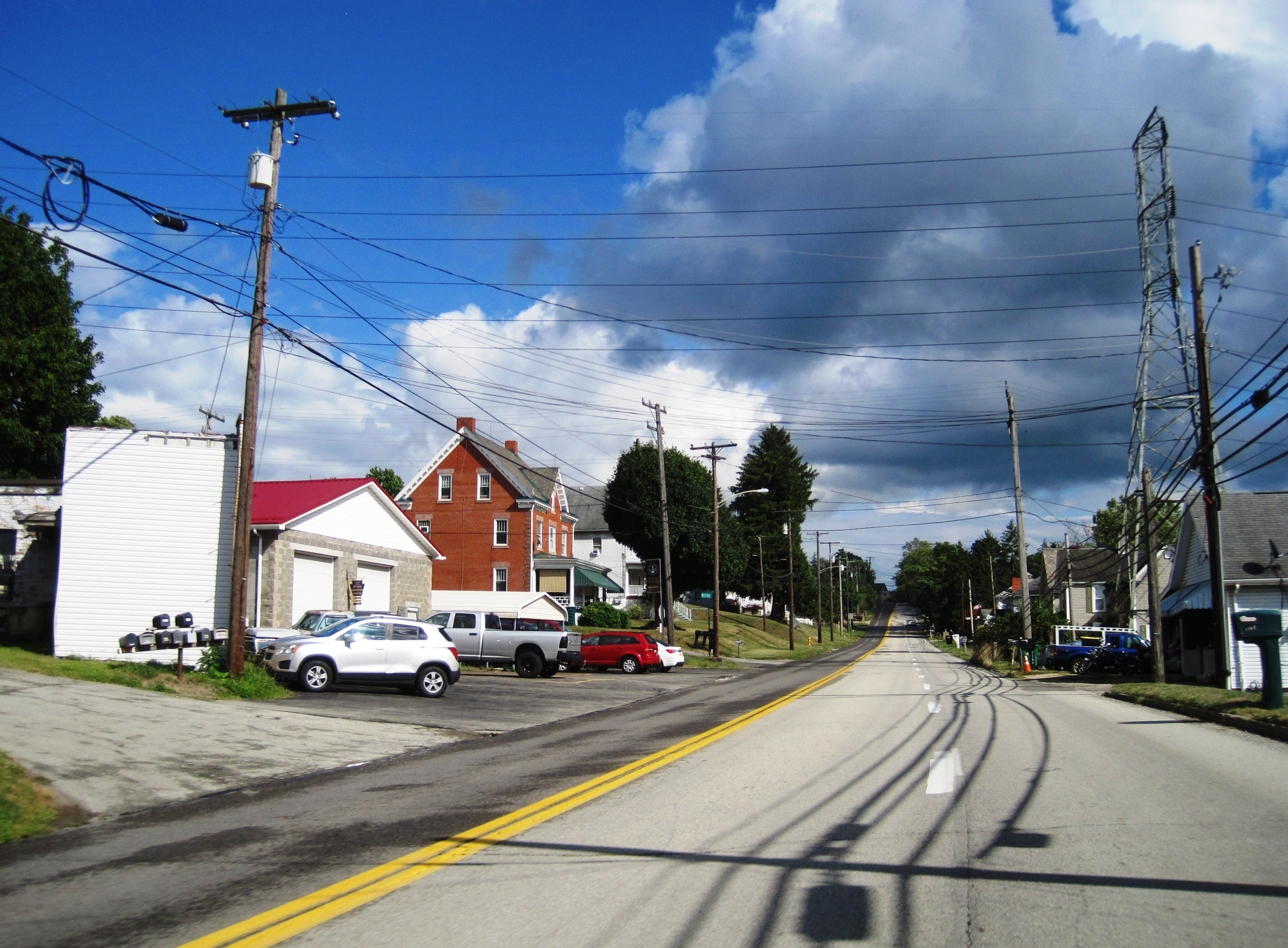
- US 19 southbound / US 40 eastbound in Laboratory

- Location within Pennsylvania Location within the United States
- Coordinates: 40°09′18″N 80°12′48″W
- Country: United States
- State: Pennsylvania
- County: Washington
- Elevation: 1,348 ft (411 m)
- Time zone: UTC-5 (Eastern (EST))
  - Summer (DST): UTC-4 (EDT)
- Area code: 724
- GNIS feature ID: 1213977

Laboratory is an unincorporated community in Washington County, Pennsylvania, United States. It is home to the Moses Little Tavern.

An early variant name was "Pancake", after George Pancake, a pioneer citizen. Laboratory has been noted for its unusual place name.

== Demographics ==
Historical population
Census	Pop.	Note	%±

The United States Census Bureau defined Laboratory as a census designated place (CDP) in 2023.
