= Glyde, Pennsylvania =

Unincorporated community in Pennsylvania, US

- Unincorporated community
- Location within Pennsylvania
- Coordinates: 40°07′32″N 80°08′12″W
- Country: United States
- State: Pennsylvania
- County: Washington
- Time zone: UTC-5 (Eastern (EST))
  - Summer (DST): UTC-4 (EDT)

Glyde is an unincorporated community in Washington County, Pennsylvania, United States. It is home to the Dager-Wonsettler Farmstead.
