= Hill's Tavern =

- U.S. National Register of Historic Places
- U.S. Historic district – Contributing property
- Pennsylvania state historical marker
- Washington County History & Landmarks Foundation Landmark
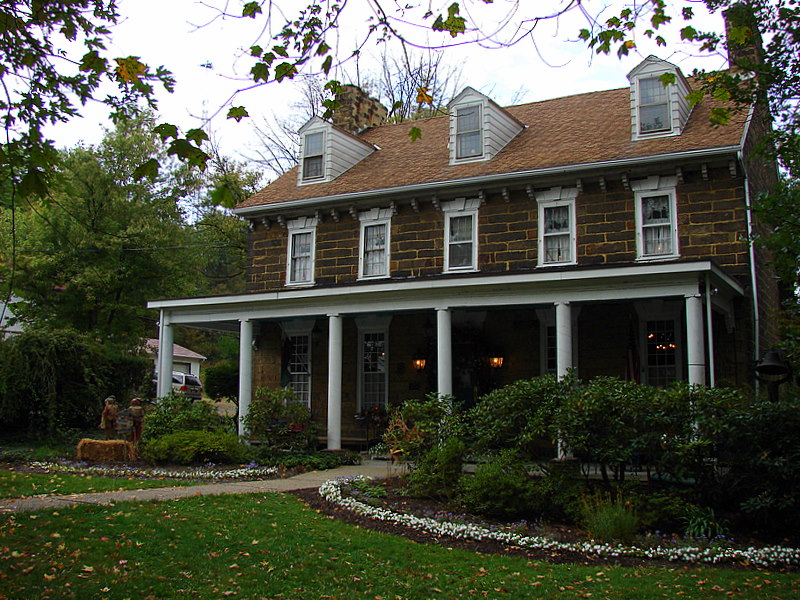

- Location within Pennsylvania Location within the United States
- Location: U.S. 40, Scenery Hill, Pennsylvania
- Coordinates: 40°5′8″N 80°4′11″W
- Area: 1 acre (0.40 ha)
- Built: 1794
- Architectural style: Greek Revival, Italianate, Georgian
- Part of: Scenery Hill Historic District (ID96001198)
- NRHP reference No.: 74001811

Significant dates
- Added to NRHP: November 19, 1974
- Designated CP: October 24, 1996
- Designated PHMC: June 1952

Logo for the Century Inn, the modern incarnation of Hill's Tavern.

Hill's Tavern is a historic building in Scenery Hill, Pennsylvania. For a period in the early 1900s, the inn was known as Central Hotel. Now called the Century Inn, it was claimed to have been the oldest tavern in continuous use on the National Road until a fire brought an end to its 221 years of continuous operation in 2015. However, the building was restored and continues operating as an inn and restaurant today.

== History ==
The tavern is located in an unincorporated community now called Scenery Hill, in the township of North Bethlehem. North Bethlehem was split from West Bethlehem in 1921, which had been split into East and West Bethlehem in 1790. The town was originally in an area called Springtown, surveyed in 1785 for Isaac Bush, who sold the land to George Hill in 1796. That land was conveyed to Hill's son Stephen in 1800. Stephen Hill and Thomas McGiffin, who had acquired an interest in the land, announced that lots would be sold for a new town called Hillsborough, "on the National road, adjoining Hill's Stone tavern" in an advertisement in the July 26th 1819 Washington Reporter.

A public house was in existence as early as 1794 at the future Hillsborough site. The first proprietor was Stephen Hill, son of George Hill. Later proprietors include Thomas Hill, a relative of Stephen Hill but not a son; then Samuel Youman, John Hampson, John Gibson, William Dawson and Oliver Lacock. They were followed by John Lacock, Mrs. P. M. Tombaugh and Jacob Gherlin through 1910. The Direct Tax of 1798 records for West Bethlehem, listing all dwelling places, shows one 24 by 22 foot log dwelling with a 20 by 18 log kitchen outbuilding for Stephen Hill. There is no stone structure listed for the property, and only one, unrelated, stone dwelling in the township.

== Architecture ==
The two and a half-story stone tavern was built with dressed stone in the Post Colonial vernacular with Georgian influences. Later modifications added Greek Revival and Italianate components. The full five-bay covered porch uses rounded columns. There is a long stone rear wing that houses the original kitchen, completed with a large craned cooking fireplace. Prior to the fire, the building was well preserved and had been in continuous operation as a tavern since it was built.

In 1952, the Pennsylvania Historical and Museum Commission installed a historical marker noting the historic importance of the tavern. It is designated as a historic public landmark by the Washington County History & Landmarks Foundation. The tavern was added to the National Register of Historic Places in 1974 and is also part of the Scenery Hill Historic District.

== Fire ==
An accidental fire on August 17, 2015, started in a wood-frame addition to the Inn. The interior was destroyed, along with antiques, and artwork. A Whiskey Rebellion flag, some think the only one associated with the rebellion, in existence, was saved.

After the August 2015 fire
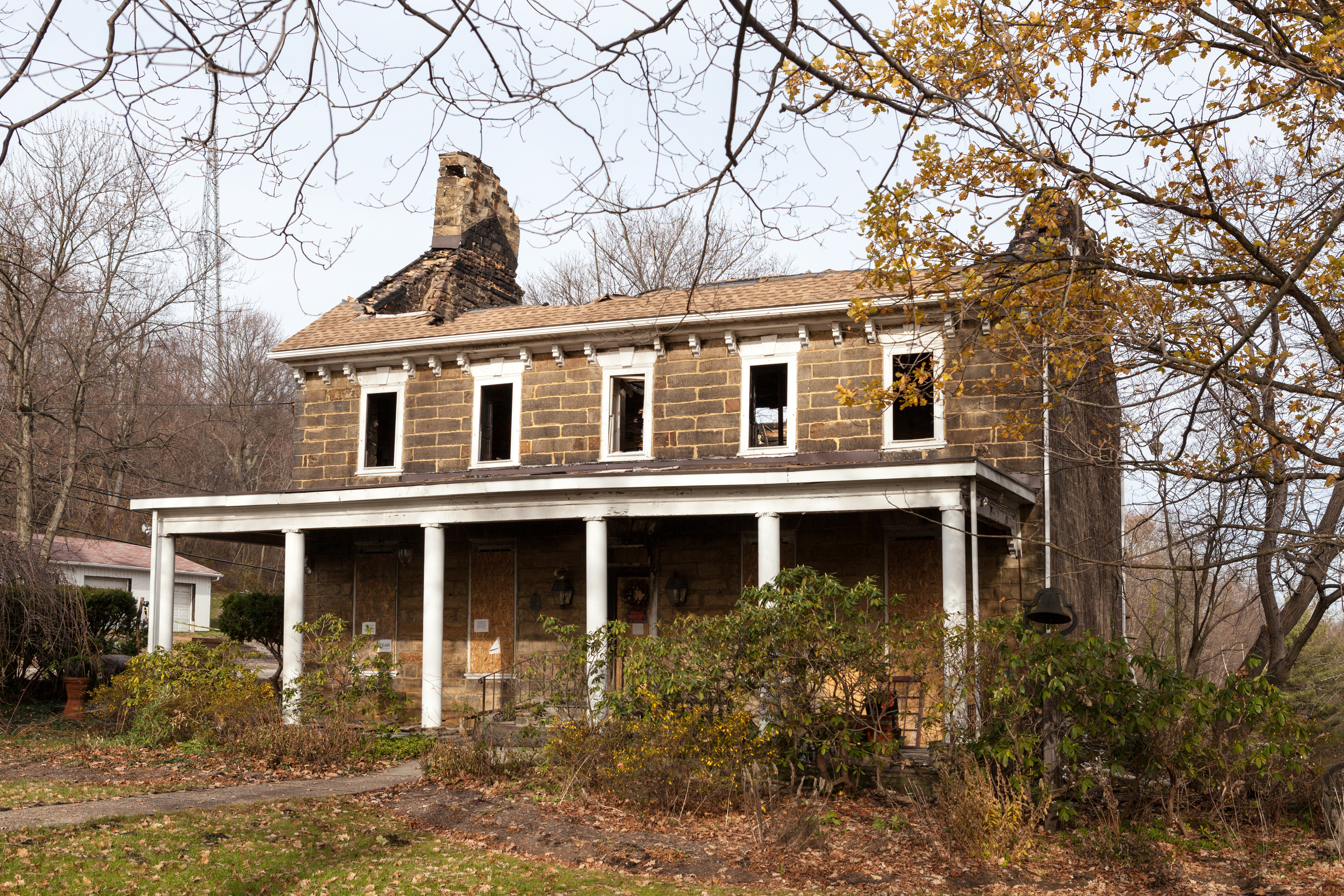
Front

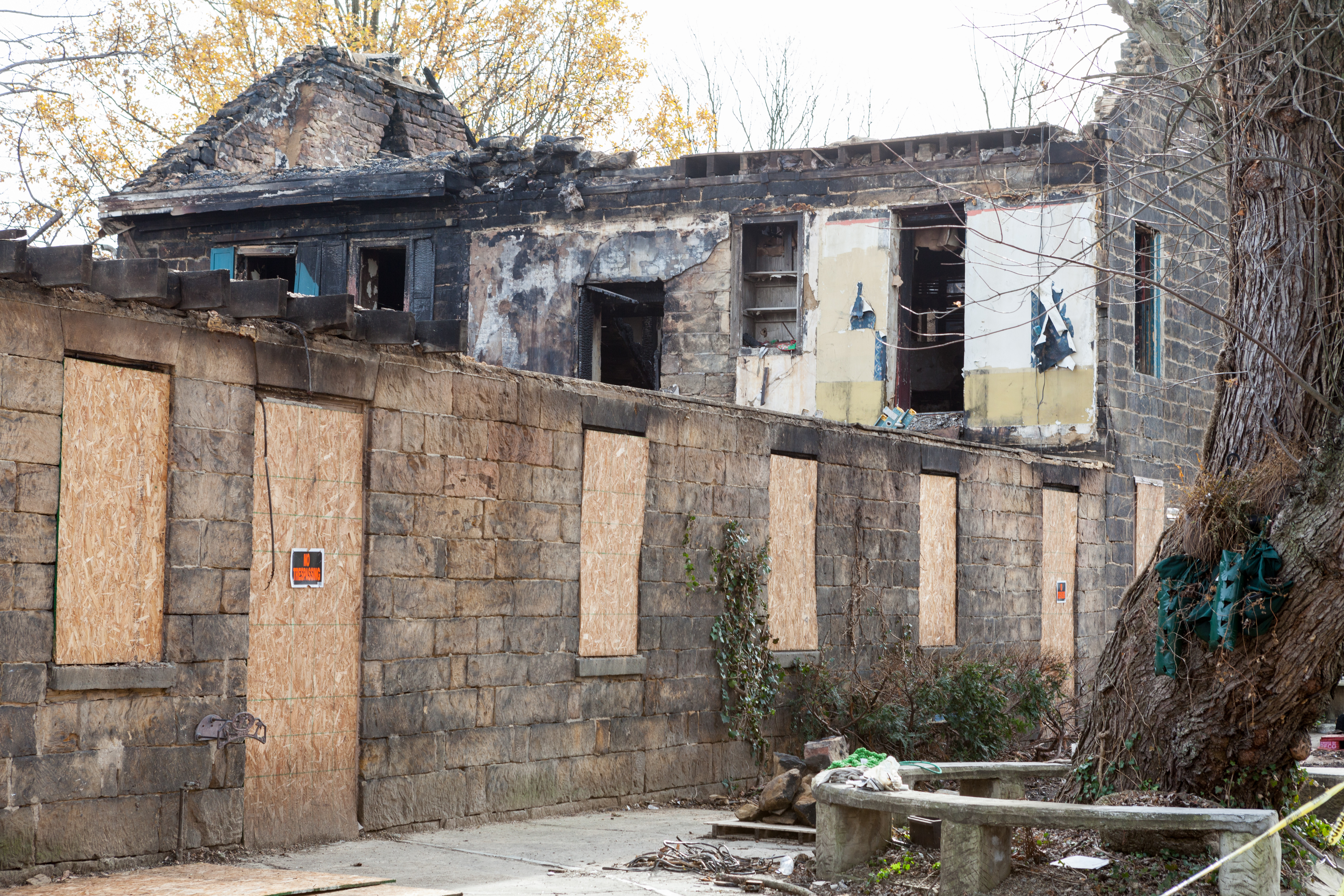
Rear
December 2015

== Reopening ==
After 30 months of rebuilding, the Century Inn was reopened on Feb 15, 2018. The front of the building, including the original stone walls, look just like they did before the fire. The interior, although new, was restored to the previous design, including furniture, antiques, trim, and artwork. The Whiskey Rebellion flag has been returned to the wall where it was previously.
