= Deemston, Pennsylvania =

Borough in Pennsylvania, US

Deemston
- Borough
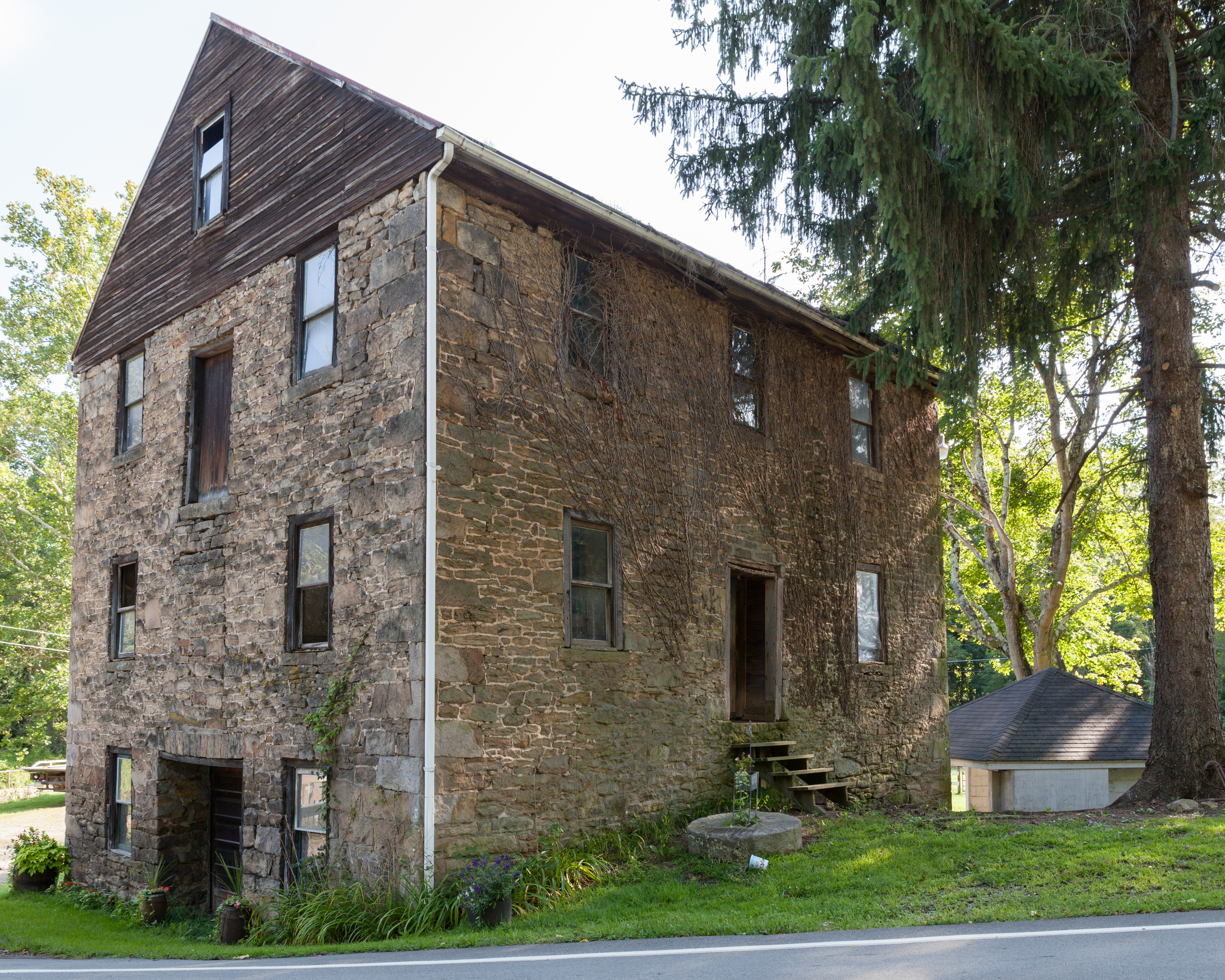
- Kinder's Mill, a historic site in the borough

- Location of Deemston in Washington County, Pennsylvania.

- Location of Deemston in Pennsylvania
- Coordinates: 40°1′8″N 80°2′38″W
- Country: United States
- State: Pennsylvania
- County: Washington
- Established: 1894

Government
  - Mayor: Robert 'Bobby' Longdon

Area
  - Total: 9.59 sq mi (24.84 km^{2})
  - Land: 9.59 sq mi (24.84 km^{2})
  - Water: 0 sq mi (0.00 km^{2})

Population (2020)
  - Total: 754
  - Density: 78.6/sq mi (30.36/km^{2})
- Time zone: UTC-4 (EST)
  - Summer (DST): UTC-5 (EDT)
- Area code: 724
- FIPS code: 42-18496
- Website: https://deemstonborough.org/

Deemston is a borough in Washington County, Pennsylvania, United States and part of the Pittsburgh metropolitan area since 1950. The population was 751 at the 2020 census.

== History ==
Kinder's Mill was listed on the National Register of Historic Places in 1986.

== Geography ==
Deemston is located at 40°1′8″N 80°2′38″W (40.018777, -80.043805).

According to the United States Census Bureau, the borough has a total area of 9.6 square miles (25 km^{2}), all land.

== Surrounding neighborhoods ==
Deemston has five borders, including Beallsville to the north, Centerville to the east, East Bethlehem Township to the south and southeast, Morgan Township in Greene County to the southwest and West Bethlehem Township to the west.

== Demographics ==
Historical population
Census	Pop.	Note	%±
1900	428		—
1910	477		11.4%
1920	499		4.6%
1930	648		29.9%
1940	710		9.6%
1950	775		9.2%
1960	873		12.6%
1970	711		−18.6%
1980	829		16.6%
1990	770		−7.1%
2000	809		5.1%
2010	722		−10.8%
2020	754		4.4%
2025 (est.)	735	▼	−2.5%

As of the census of 2000, there were 809 people, 313 households, and 239 families residing in the borough. The population density was 84.2 people per square mile (32.5 people/km^{2}). There were 325 housing units at an average density of 33.8 per square mile (13.1/km^{2}). The racial makeup of the borough was 99.26% White, 0.37% African American, 0.12% from other races, and 0.25% from two or more races. Hispanic or Latino of any race were 0.37% of the population.

There were 313 households, out of which 31.0% had children under the age of 18 living with them, 65.8% were married couples living together, 5.8% had a female householder with no husband present, and 23.6% were non-families. 20.1% of all households were made up of individuals, and 10.9% had someone living alone who was 65 years of age or older. The average household size was 2.56 and the average family size was 2.94.

In the borough the population was spread out, with 22.7% under the age of 18, 7.7% from 18 to 24, 28.4% from 25 to 44, 25.6% from 45 to 64, and 15.6% who were 65 years of age or older. The median age was 40 years. For every 100 females there were 104.3 males. For every 100 females age 18 and over, there were 101.0 males.

The median income for a household in the borough was $35,598, and the median income for a family was $41,188. Males had a median income of $33,889 versus $25,417 for females. The per capita income for the borough was $17,331. About 6.1% of families and 9.5% of the population were below the poverty line, including 11.0% of those under age 18 and 6.2% of those age 65 or over.
