= Abel McFarland =

American politician (1765–1831)

Member of the Pennsylvania Senate from the 18th district
- In office 1811–1818
- Preceded by: Isaac Weaver Jr.
- Succeeded by: Isaac Weaver Jr.

Personal details
- Born: July 27, 1765 Mount Holly, New Jersey
- Died: September 23, 1831 (aged 66)
- Party: Democratic-Republican Party

Abel McFarland was an American politician from Pennsylvania who served in the Pennsylvania State Senate, representing the 18th district from 1811 to 1818. During his tenure the 18th district represented the counties of Washington and Greene in Western Pennsylvania.

McFarland was born in Mount Holly, New Jersey to Daniel McFarland and Sarah née Barber. His parents settled in Amity, Washington County, Pennsylvania while he was still a child. Abel died on September 23, 1831.
