= Amwell Township, Pennsylvania =

Township in Pennsylvania, US

Amwell Township, Washington County, Pennsylvania
- Township
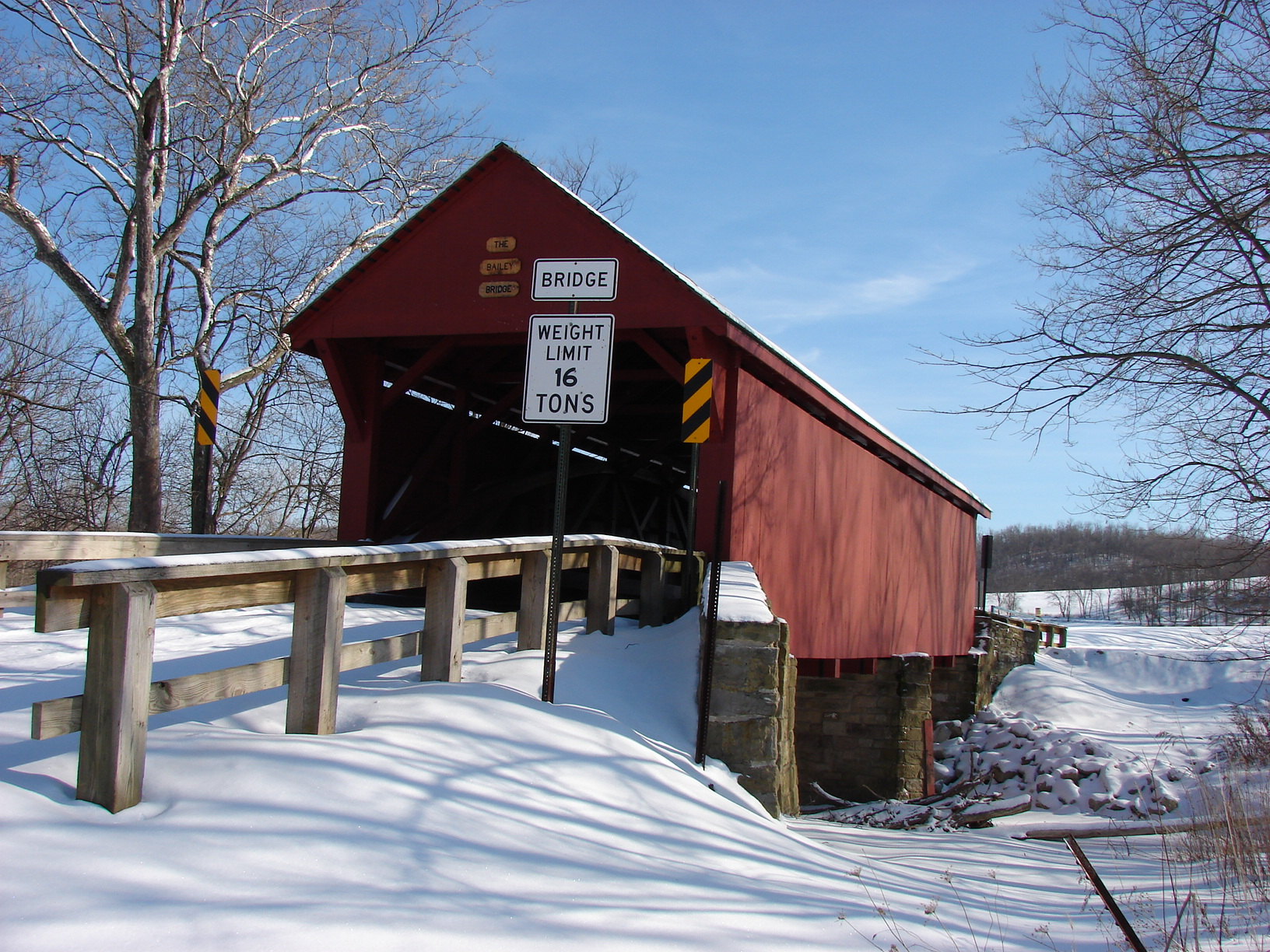
- The Bailey Covered Bridge, a historic site in the township

- Logo

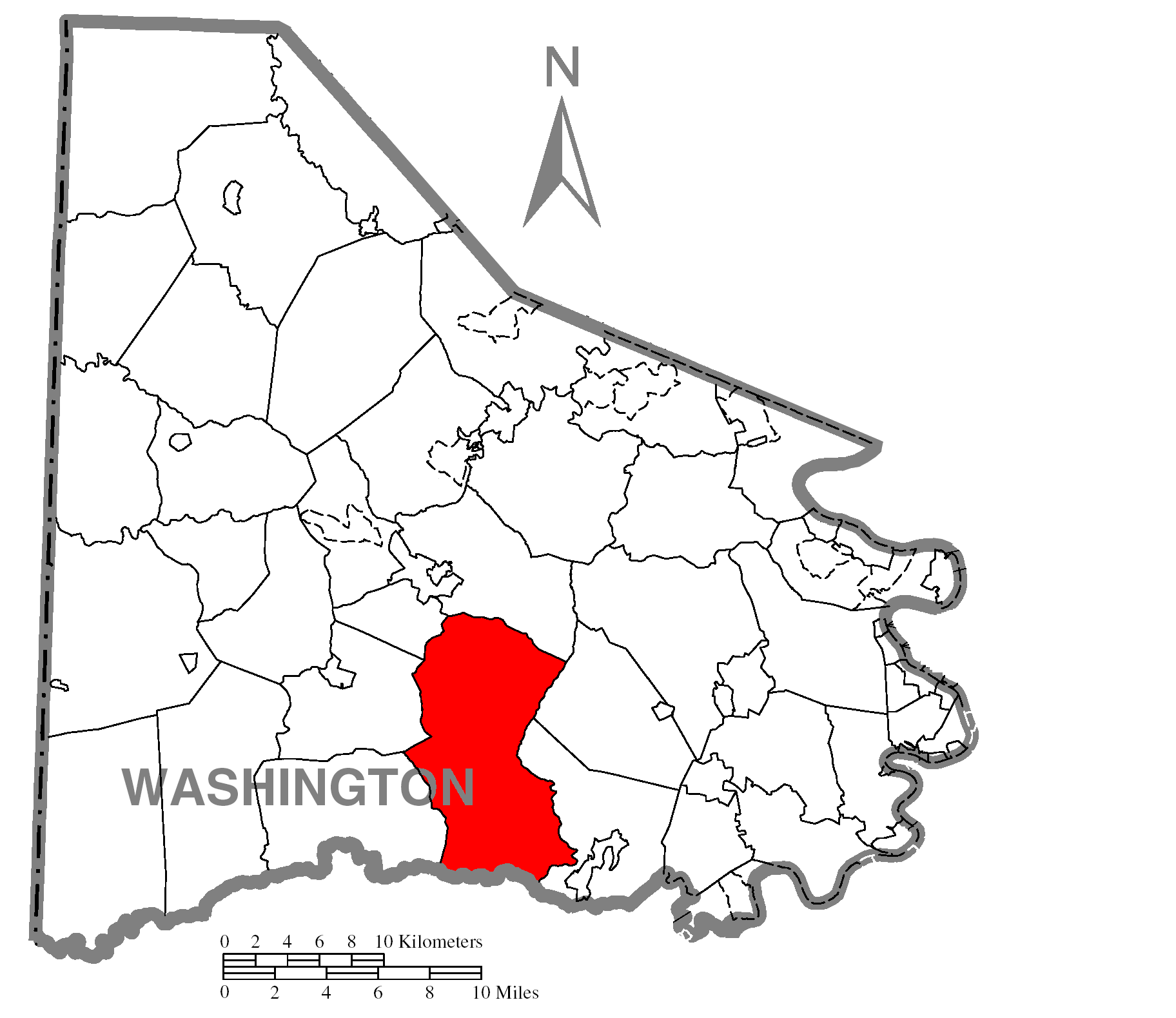
- Map of Washington County, Pennsylvania highlighting Amwell Township

- Map of Washington County, Pennsylvania
- Country: United States
- State: Pennsylvania
- County: Washington
- Established: July 1, 1781

Government
  - Type: Council

Area
  - Total: 44.78 sq mi (115.99 km^{2})
  - Land: 44.78 sq mi (115.99 km^{2})
  - Water: 0 sq mi (0.00 km^{2})

Population (2020)
  - Total: 3,684 ▼
  - Estimate (2023): 3,657
  - Density: 82.5/sq mi (31.85/km^{2})
- Time zone: UTC-5 (Eastern (EST))
  - Summer (DST): UTC-4 (EDT)
- Area code: 724
- FIPS code: 42-125-02384
- Website: www.amwelltownship.org

Historical population
Census	Pop.	Note	%±
2000	3,960		—
2010	3,751		−5.3%
2020	3,684		−1.8%
2025 (est.)	3,646		−1.0%
U.S. Decennial Census

Amwell Township is a township in Washington County, Pennsylvania, United States. The population was 3,684 at the 2020 census.

== Geography ==
According to the United States Census Bureau, the township has a total area of 44.8 square miles (116 km^{2}), all land.

== History ==
Amwell Township was one of the original 13 townships in Washington County. The 13 townships were formed July 1, 1781. Abner Howell was the first person elected to the office of justice of the peace.

The Martin's Mill Covered Bridge, Bailey Covered Bridge, Dager-Wonsettler Farmstead, Hughes Covered Bridge, and Moses Little Tavern are listed on the National Register of Historic Places.

== Demographics ==
At the 2000 census, there were 3,960 people, 1,492 households, and 1,145 families living in the township. The population density was 88.3 inhabitants per square mile (34.1/km^{2}). There were 1,566 housing units at an average density of 34.9 per square mile (13.5/km^{2}). The racial makeup of the township was 98.56% White, 0.61% African American, 0.13% Native American, 0.08% Asian, and 0.63% from two or more races. Hispanic or Latino of any race were 0.18%.

Of the 1,492 households, 32.6% had children under the age of 18 living with them, 66.2% were married couples living together, 7.2% had a female householder with no husband present, and 23.2% were non-families. 19.6% of households were one person and 7.3% were one person aged 65 or older. The average household size was 2.64 and the average family size was 3.04.

The age distribution was 23.9% under the age of 18, 6.6% from 18 to 24, 29.1% from 25 to 44, 28.3% from 45 to 64, and 12.1% 65 or older. The median age was 40 years. For every 100 females, there were 96.5 males. For every 100 females age 18 and over, there were 95.7 males.

The median household income was $44,922 and the median family income was $48,623. Males had a median income of $34,618 versus $21,006 for females. The per capita income for the township was $18,285. About 5.5% of families and 6.9% of the population were below the poverty line, including 7.4% of those under age 18 and 9.0% of those age 65 or over.
