= Pennsylvania Railroad Freight Station (Washington, Pennsylvania) =

- U.S. National Register of Historic Places
- Washington County History & Landmarks Foundation Landmark
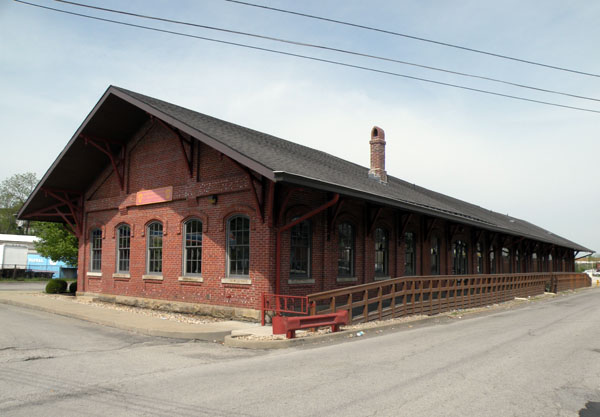
- Pennsylvania Railroad Freight Station in 2010

- Location within Pennsylvania
- Location: 111 Washington Street, Washington, Pennsylvania
- Coordinates: 40°10′20″N 80°15′15″W
- Area: 2.25 acres (0.91 ha)
- Built: 1871
- Architectural style: Late Victorian
- NRHP reference No.: 95000891
- Added to NRHP: July 21, 1995

The Pennsylvania Railroad Freight Station, also called the Chartiers Valley Railway Freight Station, is a historic, former train station building in Washington, Pennsylvania. It was listed on the National Register of Historic Places on July 21, 1995.

It is designated as a historic public landmark by the Washington County History & Landmarks Foundation.

== History ==
The station was built in 1871 for Chartiers Valley Railroad and was leased later that year to the Pittsburgh, Cincinnati and St. Louis Railroad (PC&StL). The Chartiers Valley Railroad was merged with the Pittsburgh, Cincinnati, Chicago and St. Louis Railroad (PCC&StL) in 1907. The Pennsylvania Railroad leased the Pittsburgh, Cincinnati, Chicago and St. Louis Railroad (PCC&StL) in 1921. The Pennsylvania Railroad was eventually merged with the New York Central Railroad to form Penn Central. Penn Central declared bankruptcy on 1970 and the station was sold to a private individual, instead of being transferred with the rest of Penn Central's assets to Conrail in 1976.

== See also ==
- National Register of Historic Places listings in Washington County, Pennsylvania

Preceding station	Pennsylvania Railroad	Following station
Terminus	Chartiers Branch	Tylerdale toward Pittsburgh
