= Martin's Mill Covered Bridge (Marianna, Pennsylvania) =

- U.S. National Register of Historic Places
- Washington County History & Landmarks Foundation Landmark
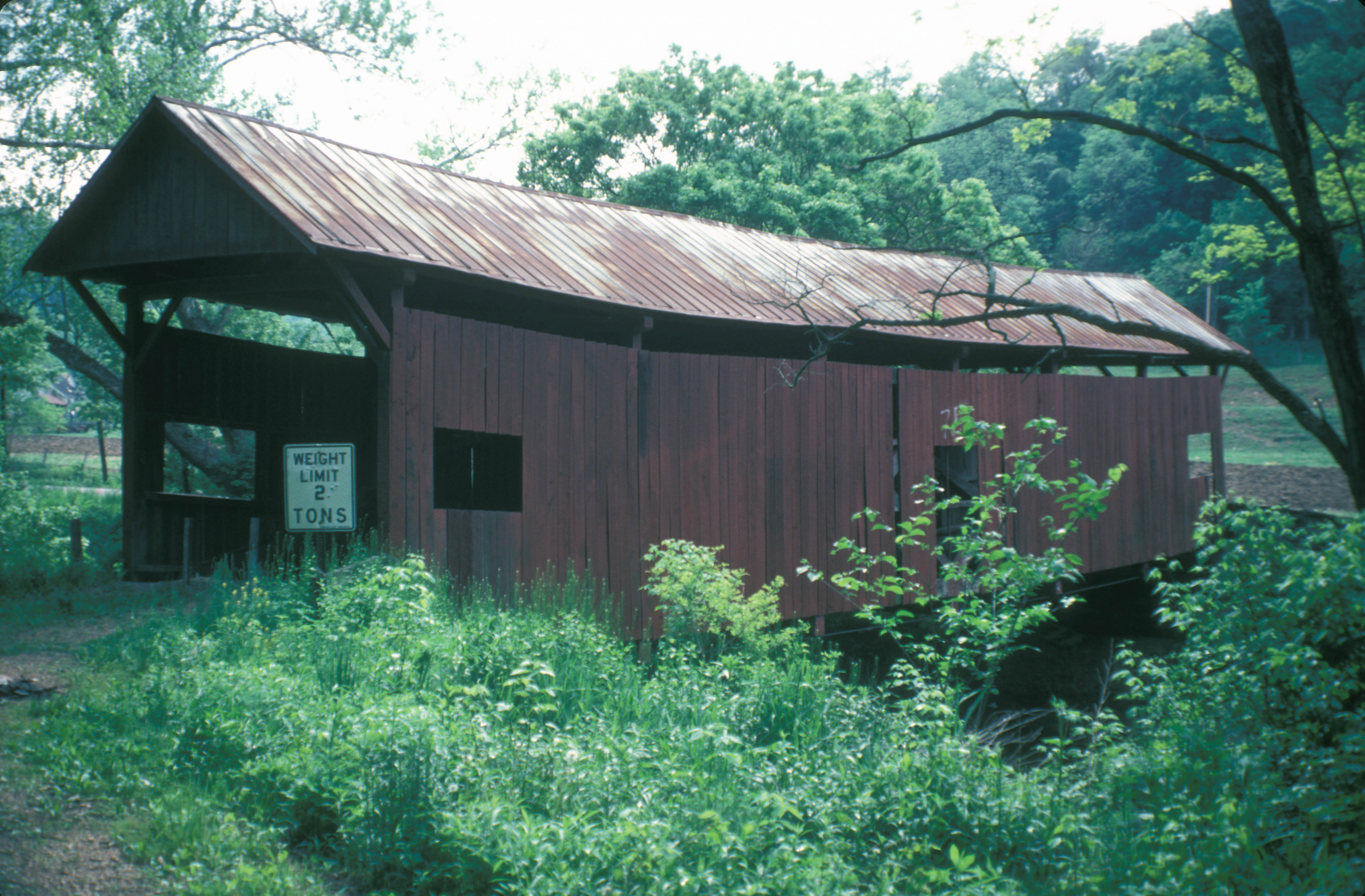

- Location within Pennsylvania Location within the United States
- Location: West of Marianna, Pennsylvania crossing Ten Mile Creek, Amwell and West Bethlehem townships
- Coordinates: 40.014358°N 80.12540°W
- Area: 0.1 acres (0.040 ha)
- Architectural style: Queenpost truss
- MPS: Covered Bridges of Washington and Greene Counties TR
- NRHP reference No.: 79003825
- Added to NRHP: June 22, 1979

Martin's Mill Covered Bridge was a historic covered bridge west of Marianna, Pennsylvania over Ten Mile Creek, on the border of Amwell and West Bethlehem Township townships in Washington County, Pennsylvania in the United States.

It is designated as a historic bridge by the Washington County History & Landmarks Foundation. The bridge no longer exists, though its stone wing walls remain.

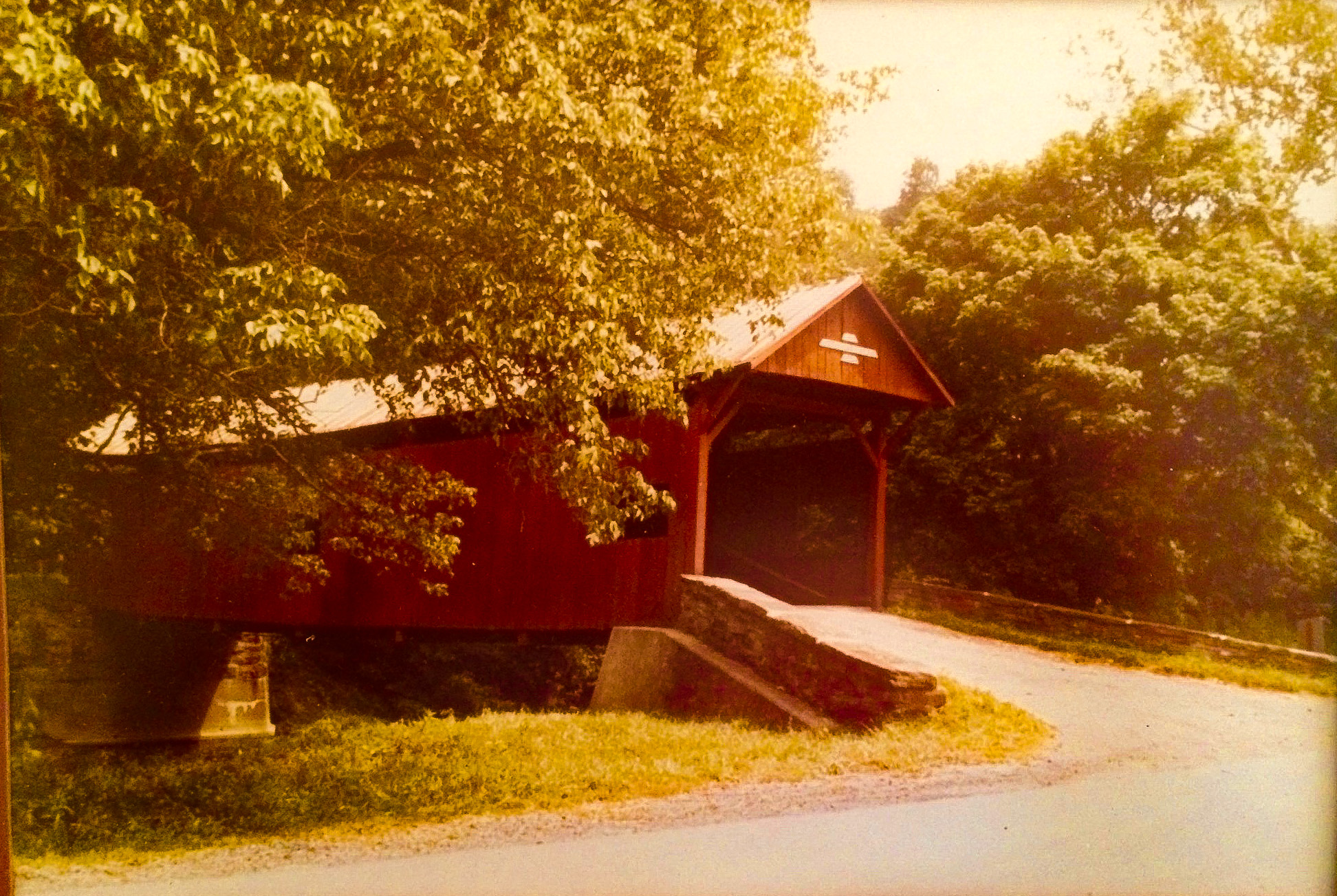
