= Kinder's Mill =

- U.S. National Register of Historic Places
- Washington County History & Landmarks Foundation Landmark
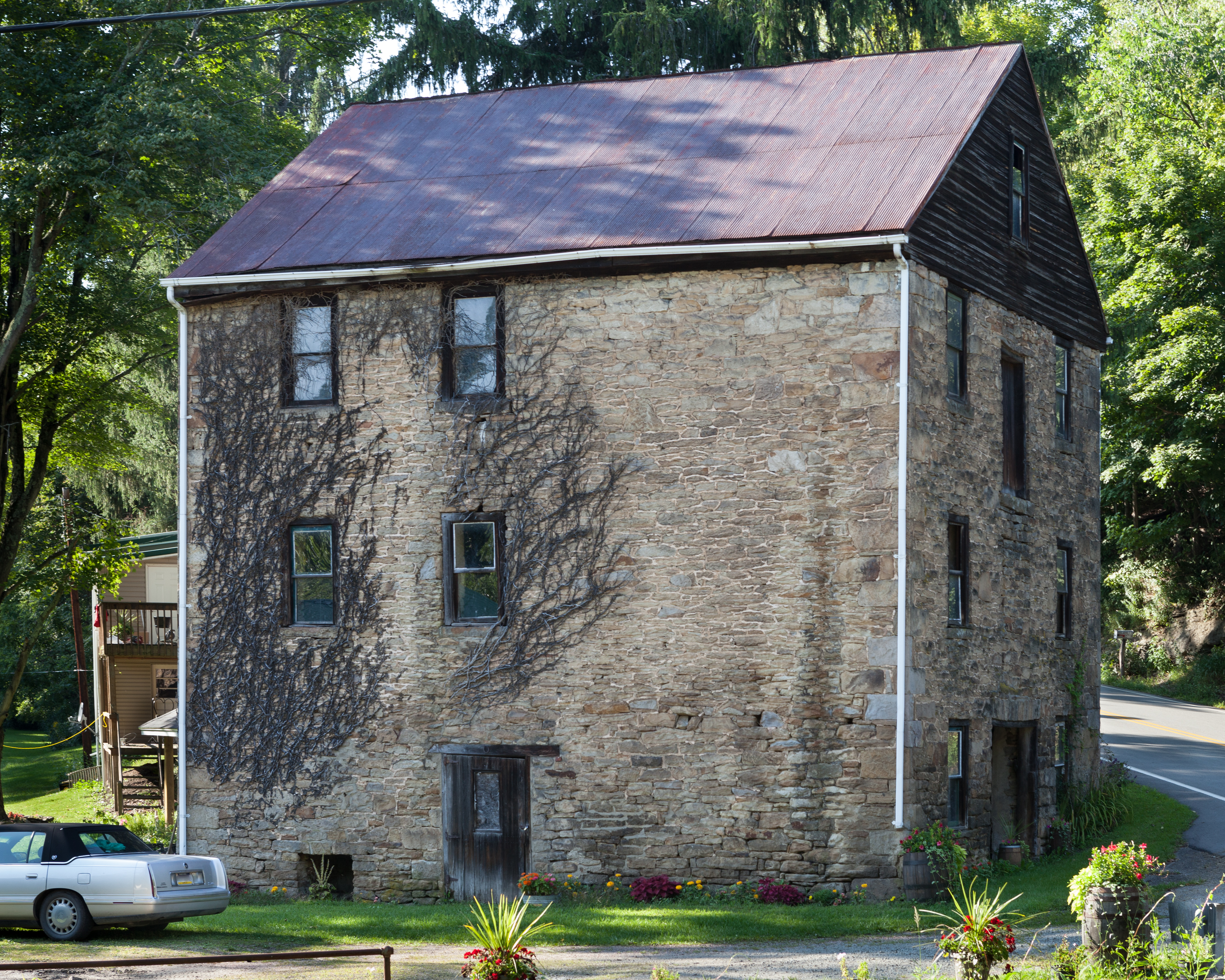
- South side of Kinders's Mill in August 2014

- Location within Pennsylvania Location within the United States
- Location: LR 62194 at Piper Rd., Deemston, Pennsylvania
- Coordinates: 40°1′51″N 80°3′18″W
- Area: 0.1 acres (0.040 ha)
- Built: 1782
- NRHP reference No.: 86002888
- Added to NRHP: October 16, 1986

Kinder's Mill is a historic building in Deemston, Pennsylvania.

It is designated as a historic residential landmark/farmstead by the Washington County History & Landmarks Foundation.
