= Hawthorne School (Canonsburg, Pennsylvania) =

- U.S. National Register of Historic Places
- Washington County History & Landmarks Foundation Landmark
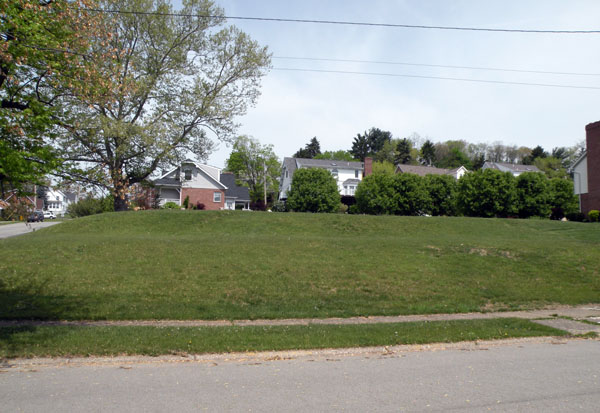
- The former site of Hawthorne School in 2010

- Location within Pennsylvania Location within the United States
- Location: Hawthorne and Bluff Streets, Canonsburg, Pennsylvania
- Coordinates: 40°15′39″N 80°11′47″W
- Area: 3 acres (1.2 ha)
- Built: 1927
- Architect: George Brugger, Carl W. Shrimp
- Architectural style: Tudor Revival
- NRHP reference No.: 86001028
- Added to NRHP: May 8, 1986

The Hawthorne School was a historic, Tudor Revival school building in Canonsburg, Pennsylvania. It was listed on the National Register of Historic Places on May 8, 1986.

It is designated as a historic public landmark by the Washington County History & Landmarks Foundation.

== History ==
In the 1920s, the borough of Canonsburg made the switch from "centralized schools", where the school was located in the center of a community, to "ward schools", where the schools spread across the community. Canonsburg hired George Brugger to design three new schools.

As opposed to the two other schools that utilitarian in design, residents had requested that the third school be more "traditional". Brugger designed the Hawthorne with Tudor Revival style.

The Hawthorne School was demolished in September 1986, after it was purchased by nearby residents to prevent it from being developed into an apartment building.

== See also ==
- National Register of Historic Places listings in Washington County, Pennsylvania
