= Horn Davis Overholtzer Bridge =

- U.S. National Register of Historic Places
- Washington County History & Landmarks Foundation Landmark
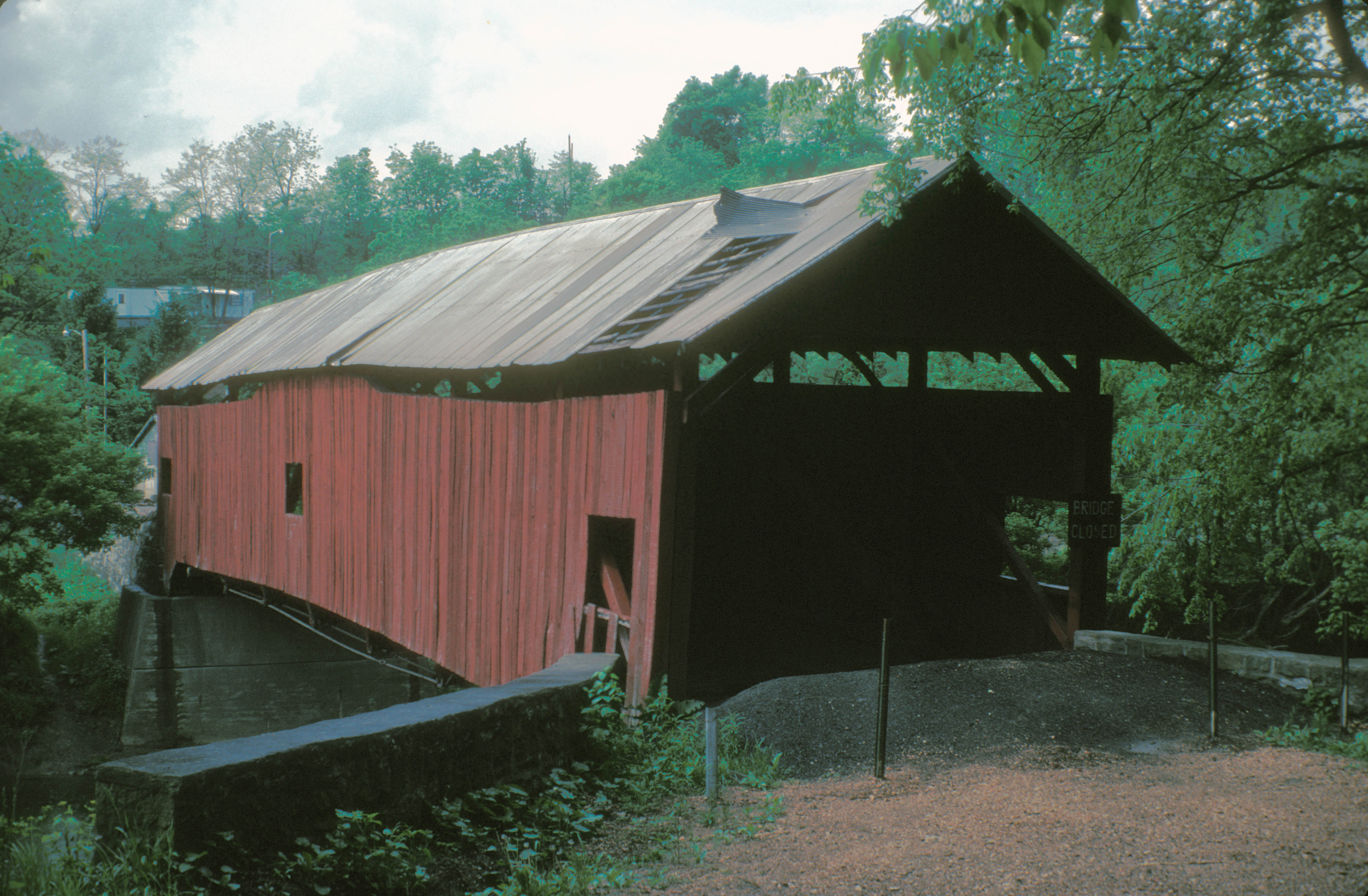
- The bridge in 1970

- Location within Pennsylvania Location within the United States
- Location: Southeast of Fairfield, Morgan Township and West Bethlehem Township, Pennsylvania
- Coordinates: 40°0′29″N 80°3′45″W
- Area: 0.1 acres (0.040 ha)
- Built: 1889
- Architectural style: Burr Arch
- MPS: Covered Bridges of Washington and Greene Counties TR
- NRHP reference No.: 79002354
- Added to NRHP: June 22, 1979

The Horn or Horn Davis or Overholtzer Bridge was a historic wooden covered bridge located in Morgan Township in Greene County and West Bethlehem Township in Washington County, Pennsylvania.

It was listed on the National Register of Historic Places in 1979. and was designated as a historic bridge by the Washington County History & Landmarks Foundation.

The bridge collapsed in March 1994, and has not been replaced or rebuilt.

== History and architectural features ==
This historic structure was a 96-foot-long (29 m), Burr Arch truss bridge that was erected in 1889. It crossed Ten Mile Creek. As of October 1978, it was one of nine historic covered bridges in Greene County.
