= Scenery Hill Historic District =

Historic district in Pennsylvania, United States

- U.S. National Register of Historic Places
- U.S. Historic district
- Washington County History & Landmarks Foundation Landmark
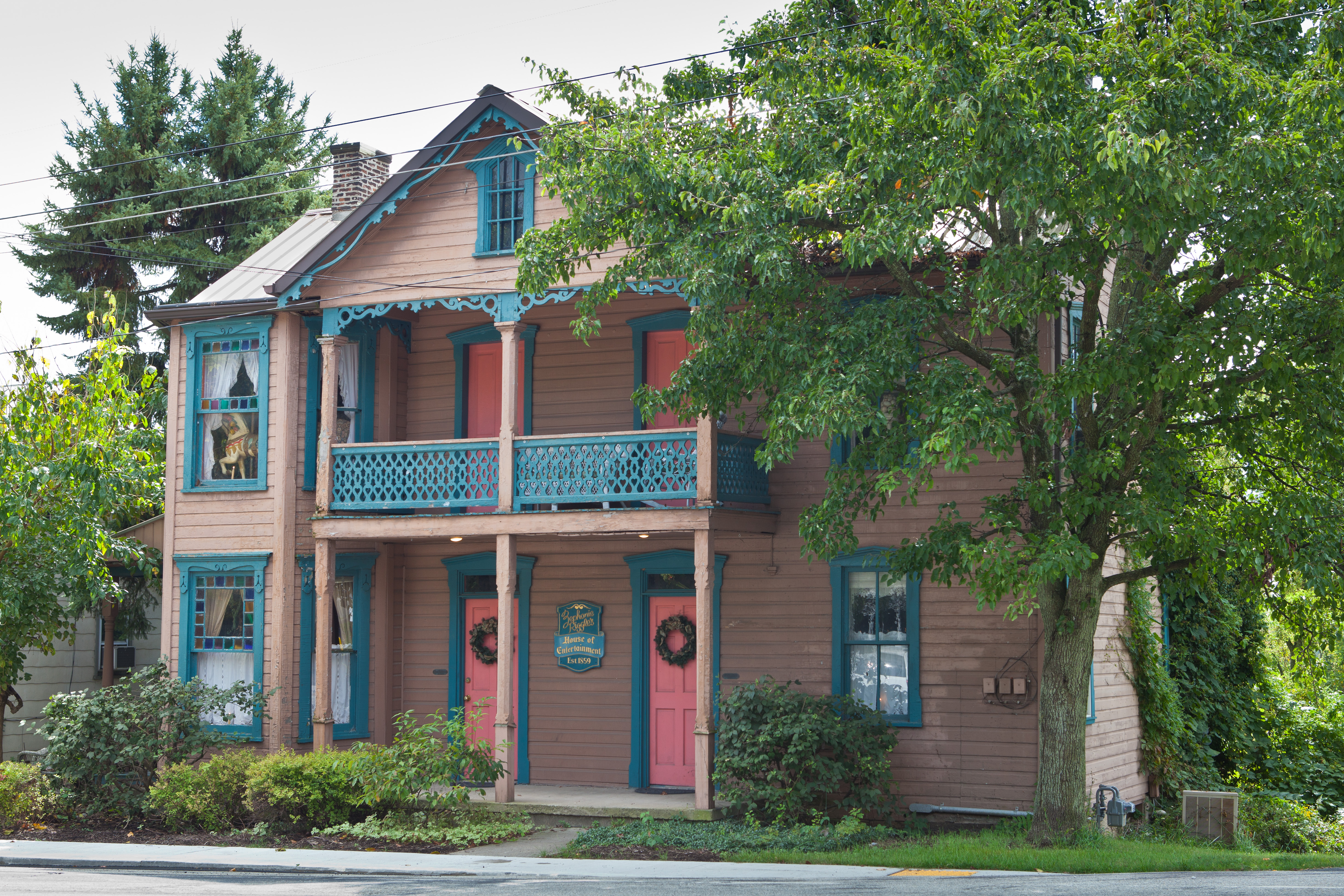
- Zephania Riggles House of Entertainment (ca. 1820), Scenery Hill

- Location within Pennsylvania Location within the United States
- Location: Roughly, National Pike East-US 40 between Scenery Hill Cemetery and Kinder Rd., Scenery Hill, Pennsylvania
- Coordinates: 40°5′8″N 80°4′17″W
- Area: 35 acres (14 ha)
- Built: 1819
- Architectural style: Queen Anne, Italianate, Greek Revival
- MPS: National Road in Pennsylvania MPS
- NRHP reference No.: 96001198
- Added to NRHP: October 24, 1996

The Scenery Hill Historic District is a historic district that is located in Scenery Hill, Pennsylvania. It was listed on the National Register of Historic Places in 1996.

== History and architectural features ==
This historic district is a typical Pike Town that is situated on the National Road. Most of the buildings in the district were erected during the two boom periods of the road, c. 1818 – c. 1853 and c. 1910 – c. 1930. It contains ninety-three buildings, including taverns, shops, service facilities, and residences. Most of the commercial buildings are clustered in the center of the district, east of the National Road (now U.S. Route 40) intersection with Spring Valley and Fava Farm Roads.

Two buildings also have separate listings on the national register. Hill's Tavern (c. 1794) is the central landmark in the district and, until heavily damaged by a fire on August 17, 2015, had still been in use as a restaurant and hotel, now called the Century Inn. The Ringland Tavern (1827) is not currently in use.

This area was designated as a historic district by the Washington County History & Landmarks Foundation.
