= Frank L. Ross Farm =

Historic house in Pennsylvania, United States

- U.S. National Register of Historic Places
- Washington County History & Landmarks Foundation Landmark
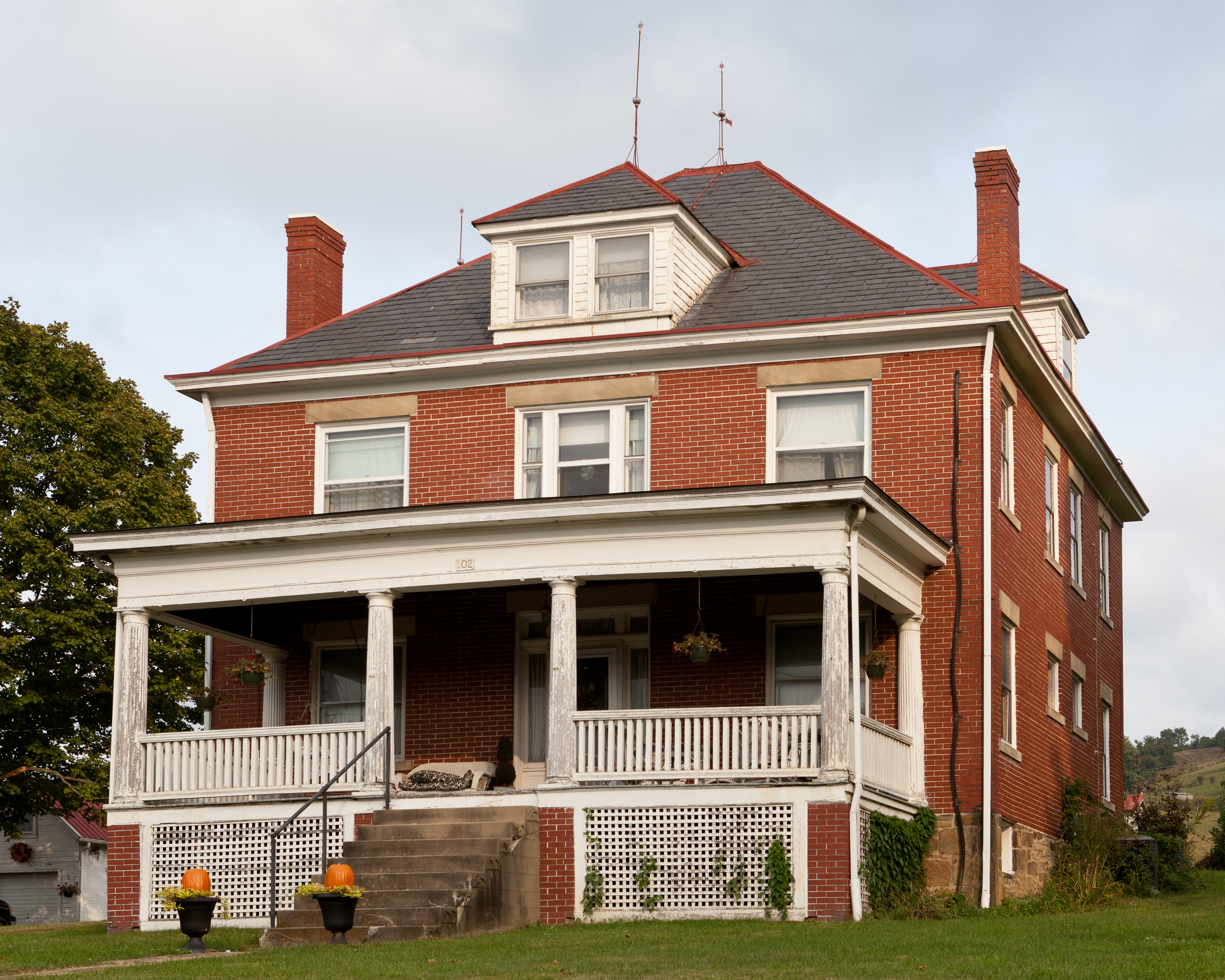

- Location within Pennsylvania Location within the United States
- Location: PA 519, 0.3 mi. N of US 40, North Bethlehem Township, Washington County, Pennsylvania
- Coordinates: 40°7′56″N 80°8′1″W
- Area: 174 acres (70 ha)
- Built: 1911
- Architect: Hall, C.M.; Hixon, F.M.
- Architectural style: Colonial Revival, Bungalow/Craftsman
- NRHP reference No.: 02000226
- Added to NRHP: March 20, 2002

Frank L. Ross Farm is a historic building in North Bethlehem Township, Washington County, Pennsylvania, United States.

It is designated as a historic residential landmark/farmstead by the Washington County History & Landmarks Foundation.
