= Hawthorne School (Brunswick, Maine) =

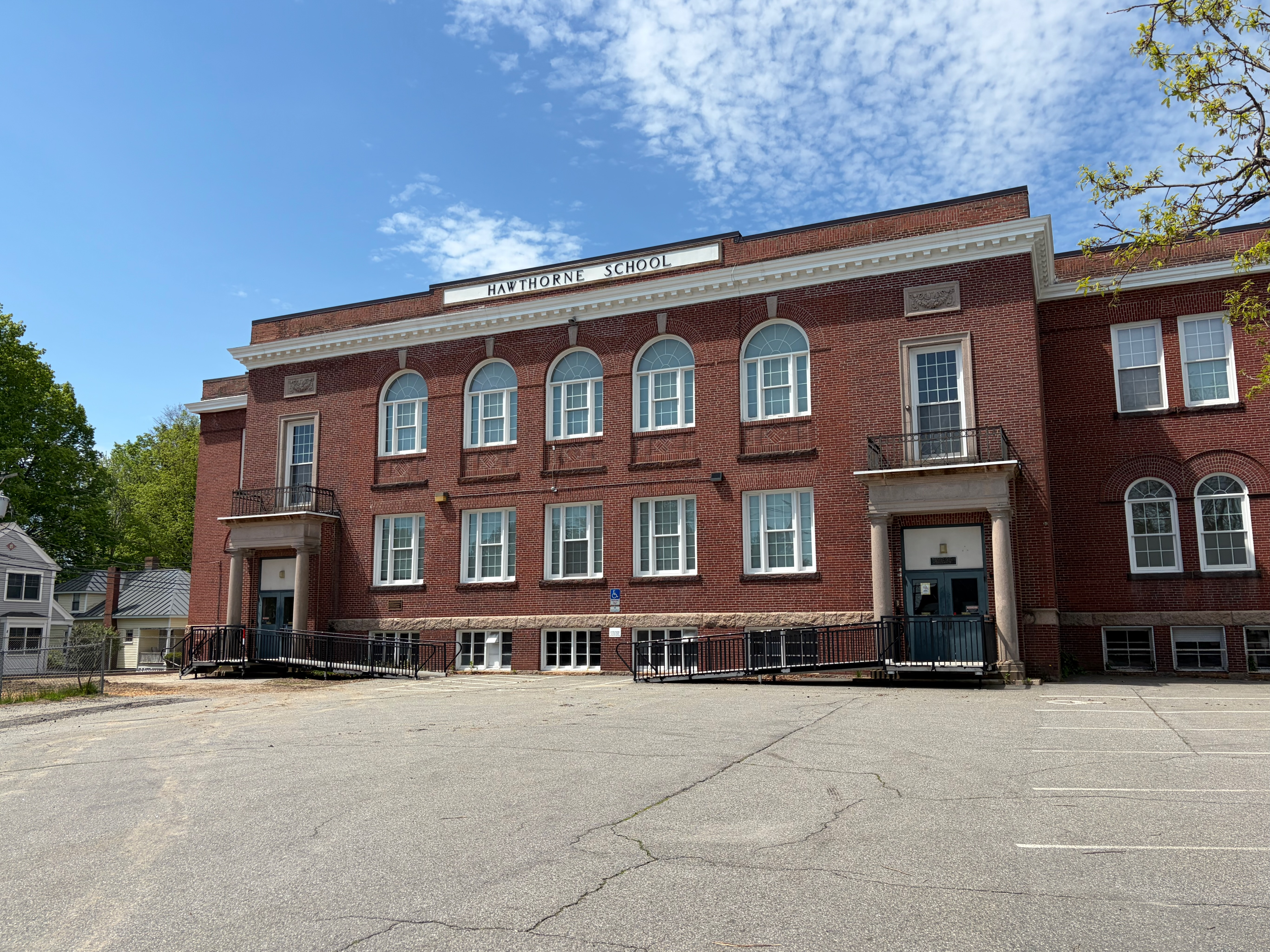
- Pictured in 2026

Location
- 46 Federal Street; Brunswick, Maine 04096; United States; 43.91410°N 69.96275°W

Information
- Former name: Brunswick High School

The Hawthorne School is a former school building in Brunswick, Maine, United States. It stands on Federal Street, between School Street and Green Street, in the town's Federal Street Historic District.

A school building was first erected on the site in 1851. It had a lower school on the building's first floor and a high school above. In the attic space was a physics and chemistry laboratory. That building was demolished in 1891.

A second building initially served as Brunswick's high school. It burned down in January 1915 and was replaced the following year. Between 1938 (when the high school moved to Spring Street) and 2009, it was Hawthorne Elementary School.

In 2015, the building became one of fourteen sites in Brunswick, Harpswell and Topsham to have a plaque added by the Village Heritage Society and Brunswick Area Pride and Heritage Committee. It was recognized as being the site of the first public high school in Brunswick.

As of 2026, it sits vacant, last used as office space for the Brunswick School Department, but plans were announced that September to convert the building's interior into 26 units, most of which would be classed as affordable housing, as well as a potential daycare business or a space for community usage.
