= Ringland Tavern =

Historic commercial building in Pennsylvania, United States

- U.S. National Register of Historic Places
- Washington County History & Landmarks Foundation Landmark
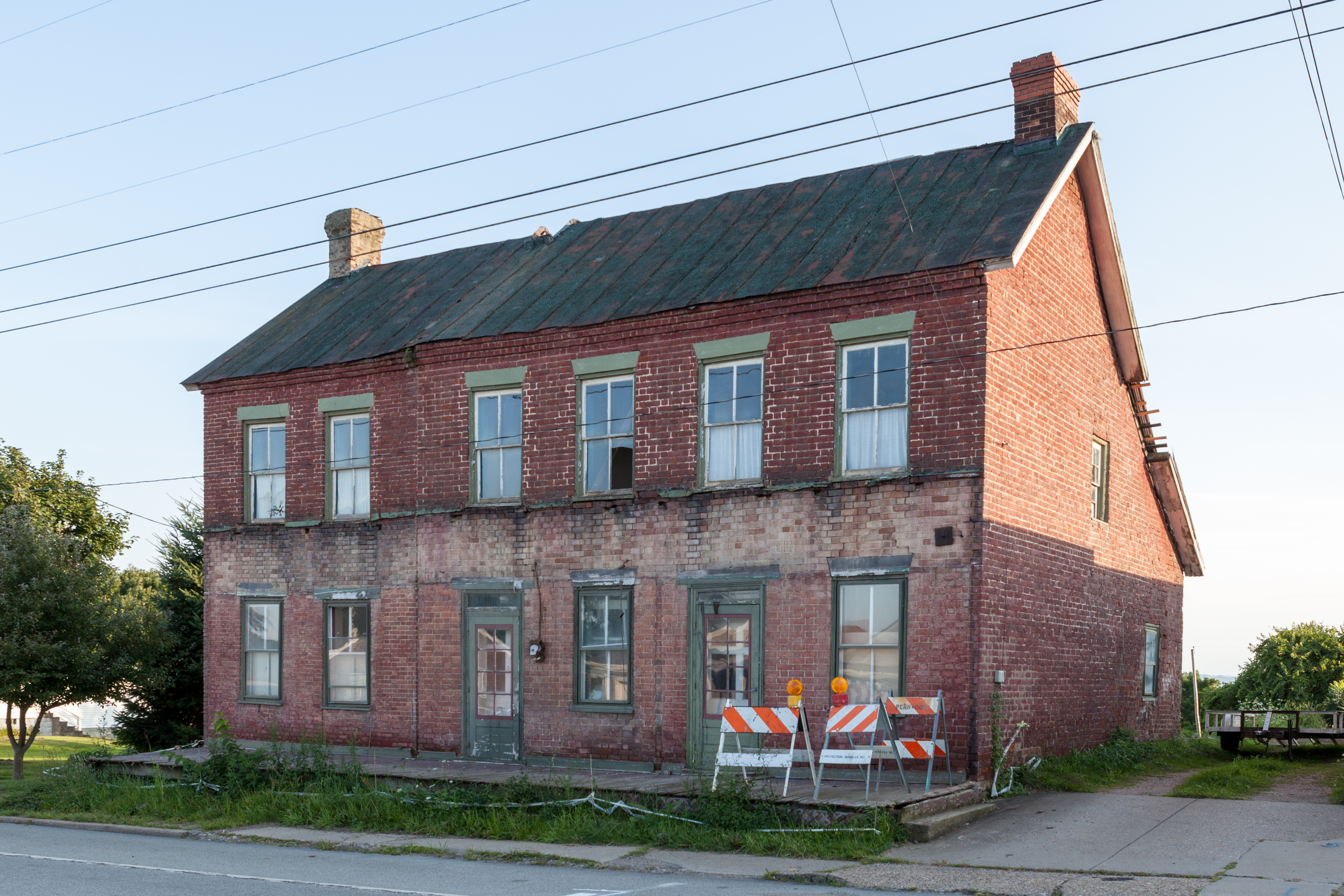
- Ringland Tavern in August 2014

- Location within Pennsylvania Location within the United States
- Location: US 40, North Bethlehem Township, Scenery Hill, Pennsylvania
- Coordinates: 40°5′3″N 80°4′6″W
- Area: less than one acre
- Built: 1827
- Architectural style: Federal
- MPS: National Road in Pennsylvania MPS
- NRHP reference No.: 96000091
- Added to NRHP: February 16, 1996

Ringland Tavern is a historic building in Scenery Hill, Pennsylvania. It is designated as a historic residential landmark/farmstead by the Washington County History & Landmarks Foundation.
