= Philip Friend House =

Historic house in Pennsylvania, United States

- U.S. National Register of Historic Places
- Washington County History & Landmarks Foundation Landmark
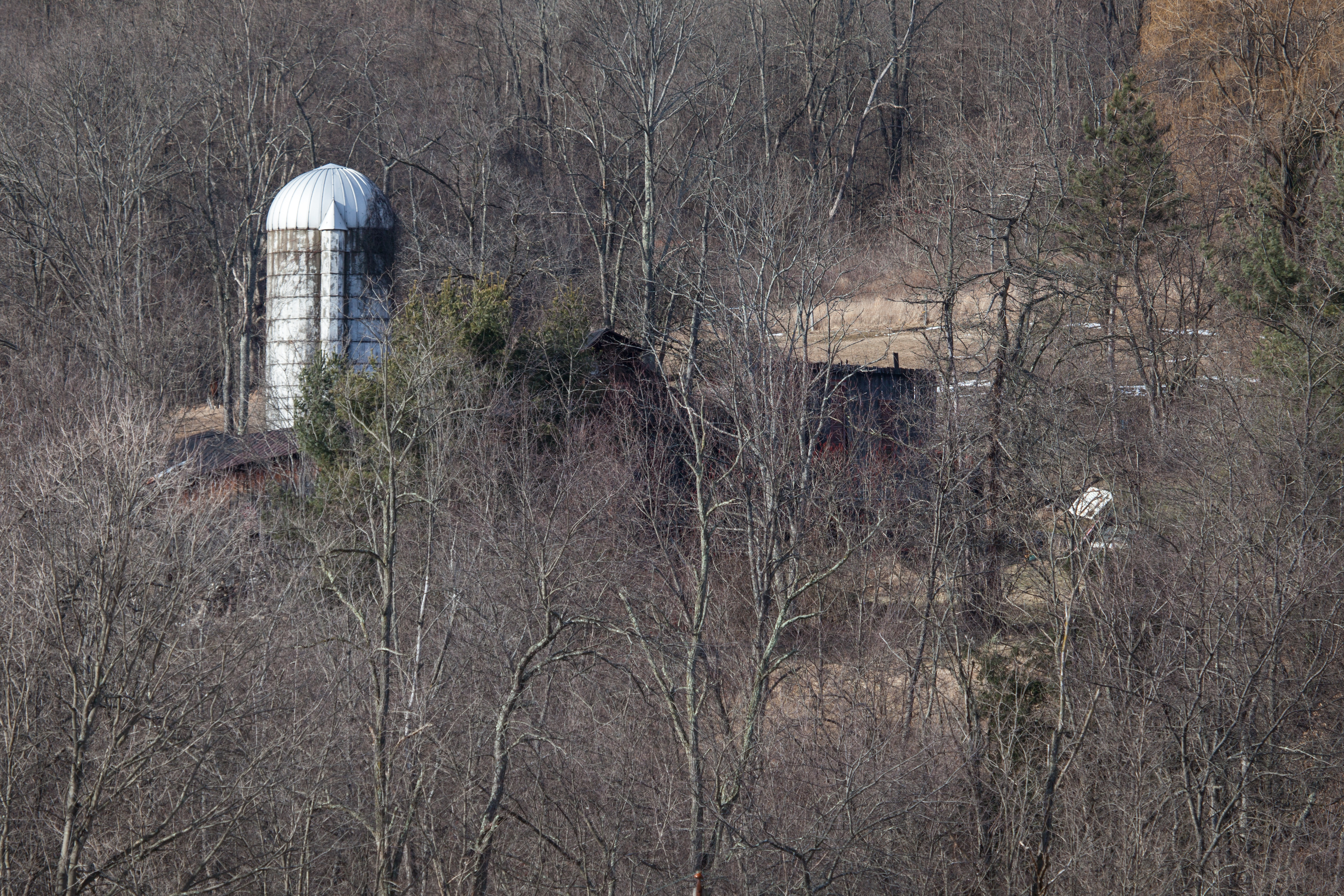
- The 19th century barn and 1940s silo

- Location within Pennsylvania Location within the United States
- Location: 105 Little Daniels Run Rd., North Bethlehem Township, Pennsylvania
- Coordinates: 40°4′14″N 80°7′32.5″W
- Area: 2 acres (0.81 ha)
- Built: 1807
- Architectural style: Federal
- NRHP reference No.: 98001371
- Added to NRHP: November 12, 1998

Philip Friend House is a c. 1807 historic farm house in North Bethlehem Township, Pennsylvania, US. The stone house is forty feet by thirty feet, two-story, five-bay, and gable-roofed. Contributing outbuildings include a barn, springhouse, wash house, and privy.

It is designated as a historic residential landmark/farmstead by the Washington County History & Landmarks Foundation, and is listed on the National Register of Historic Places.
