= Leatherman Covered Bridge =

Historic covered bridge in Scenery Hill, Pennsylvania

- U.S. National Register of Historic Places
- Washington County History & Landmarks Foundation Landmark
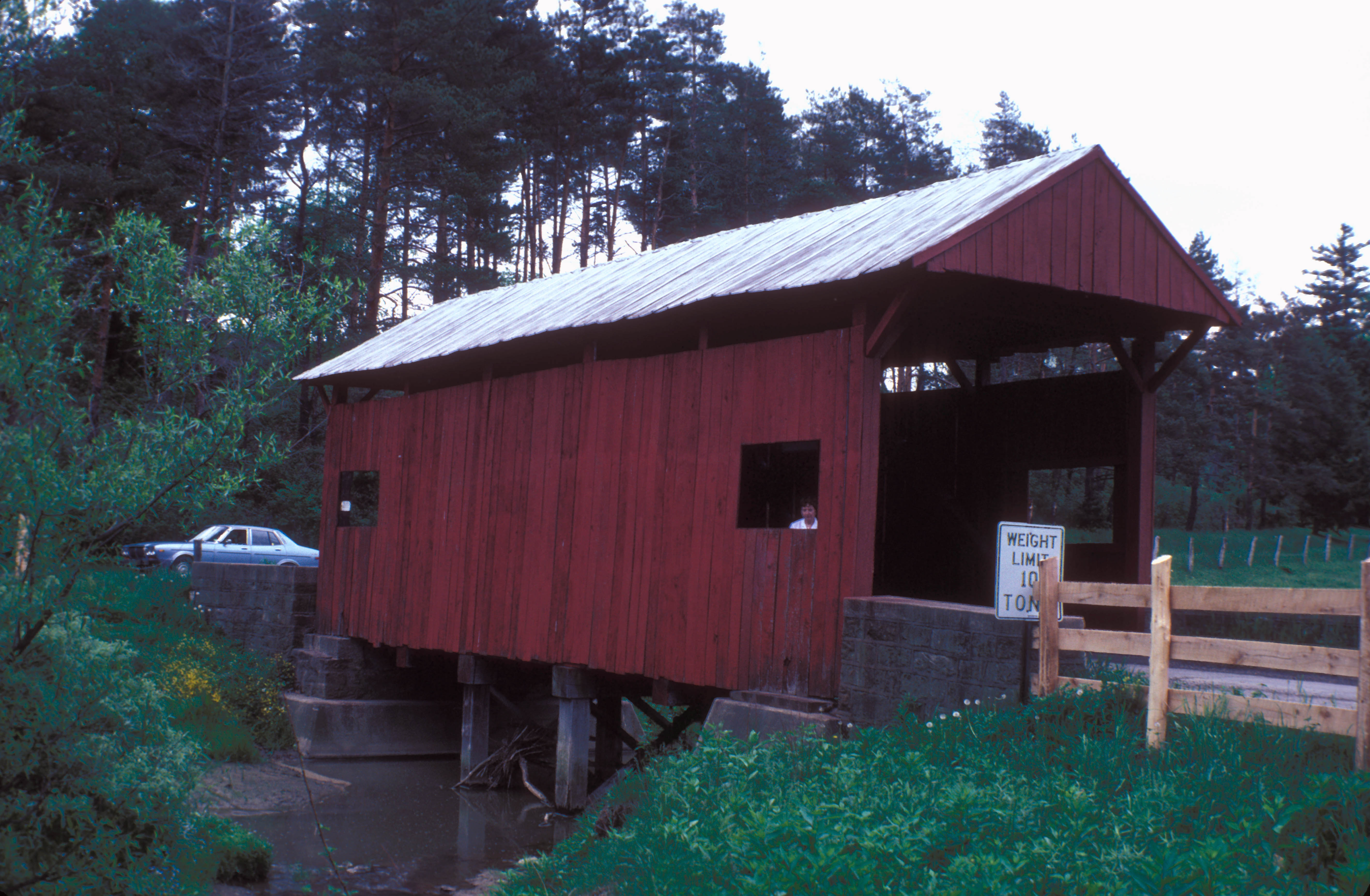

- Location within Pennsylvania Location within the United States
- Nearest city: Scenery Hill, Pennsylvania
- Coordinates: 40.109236°N 80.071667°W
- Area: 0.1 acres (0.040 ha)
- Architectural style: Queenpost truss
- MPS: Covered Bridges of Washington and Greene Counties TR
- NRHP reference No.: 79002351
- Added to NRHP: June 22, 1979

The Leatherman Covered Bridge is a historic covered bridge in Scenery Hill, Pennsylvania.

It is designated as a historic bridge by the Washington County History & Landmarks Foundation. It is known for its barn-like appearance.
