= Dager-Wonsettler Farmstead =

Historic house in Pennsylvania, United States

- U.S. National Register of Historic Places
- Washington County History & Landmarks Foundation Landmark
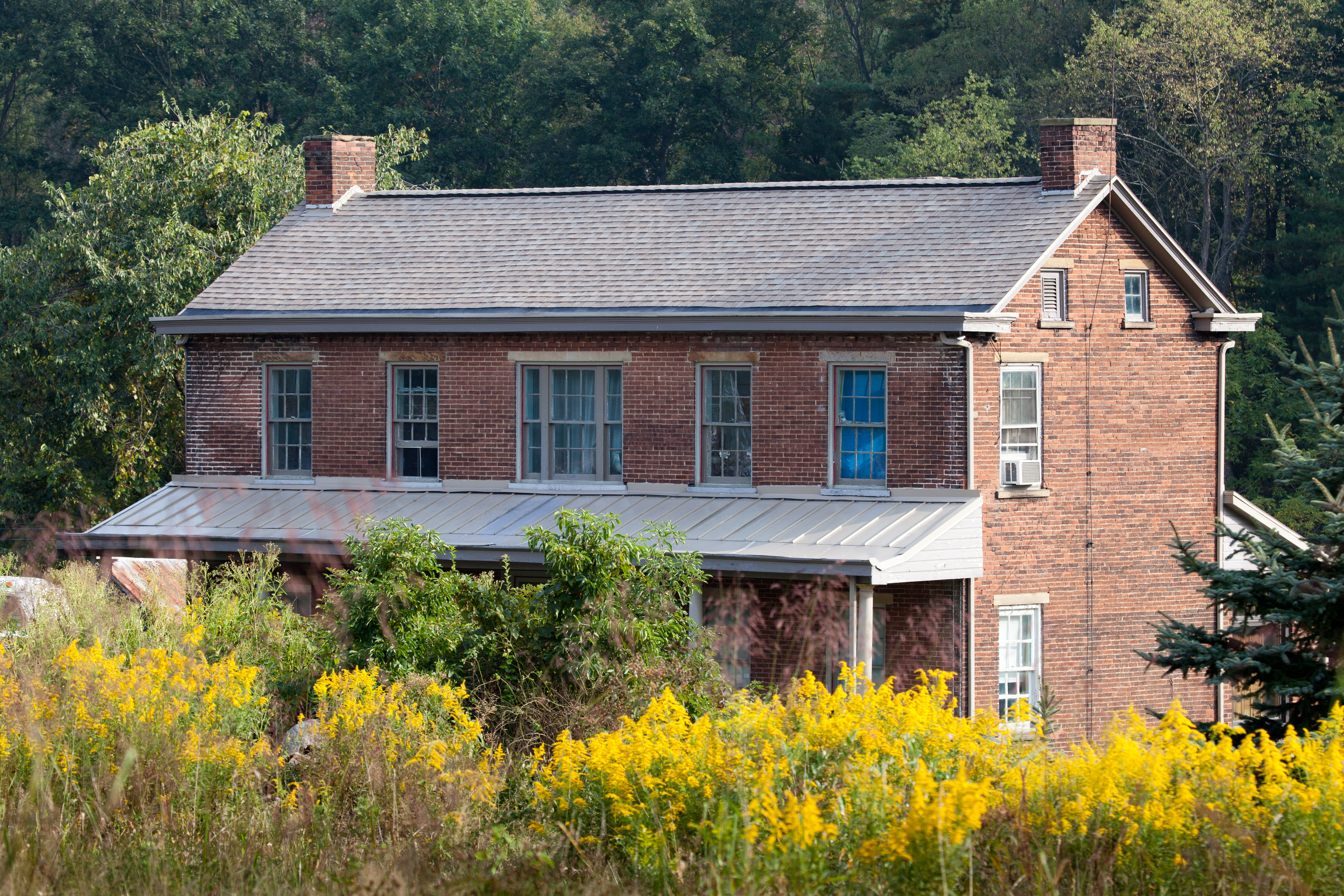

- Location within Pennsylvania Location within the United States
- Nearest city: Glyde, Pennsylvania
- Coordinates: 40°7′49″N 80°8′51″W
- Area: 10.2 acres (4.1 ha)
- Architectural style: Greek Revival
- NRHP reference No.: 03001192
- Added to NRHP: November 21, 2003

Dager-Wonsettler Farmstead is a historic building in Glyde, Pennsylvania. It is designated as a historic residential landmark/farmstead by the Washington County History & Landmarks Foundation.
