= Scenery Hill, Pennsylvania =

Unincorporated community in Pennsylvania, US

Scenery Hill
- Unincorporated community
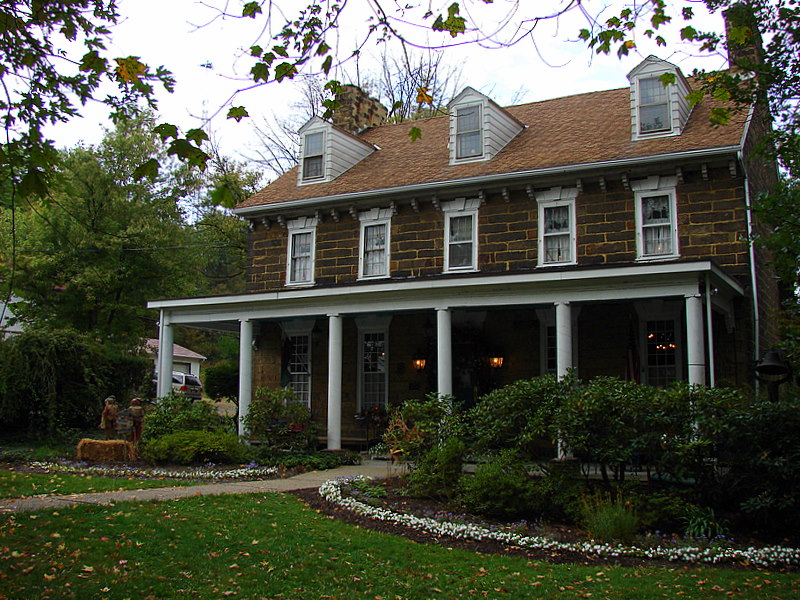
- The Century Inn, also known as Hill's Tavern

- Location within the U.S. state of Pennsylvania Scenery Hill (the United States)
- Coordinates: 40°5′9″N 80°4′13″W
- Country: United States
- State: Pennsylvania
- County: Washington
- Elevation: 1,388 ft (423 m)
- Time zone: UTC-5 (Eastern (EST))
  - Summer (DST): UTC-4 (EDT)
- ZIP codes: 15360
- Website: www.visitsceneryhillpa.com

Scenery Hill, which was known as Hillsborough prior to April 10, 1867, is an unincorporated community which is located in North Bethlehem Township in Washington County, Pennsylvania, United States. It serves as the postal address for most North Bethlehem Township residents. The ZIP code is 15360.

The village is located along U.S. Route 40, which is also known as the National Pike or National Road. It was the first east–west highway constructed in the U.S.

Each year a large festival is held along the road in May stretching from parts of Maryland into Ohio. Scenery Hill often features entertainment and other exhibits during the event. Many of the residential and commercial buildings in the community are part of the Scenery Hill Historic District, listed on the National Register of Historic Places.

== History ==
The community was initially named for Robert Hill, an early settler. The Hill family is recognized for building Hill's Tavern (now known as Century Inn), between 1788 and 1794.

Hill's Tavern was constructed in the eighteenth century, and is a historic centerpiece of the village. A fire on August 17, 2015 heavily damaged it.

Many antique shops occupy the old homes along the main thoroughfare, and multiple family names have existed in the region since the eighteenth century.

Surrounded by sheep and cattle farms, Scenery Hill is also home to small Lutheran and Methodist congregations. It is located at an elevation of 1,388 feet (423 m).
