= Moses Little Tavern =

- U.S. National Register of Historic Places
- Washington County History & Landmarks Foundation Landmark
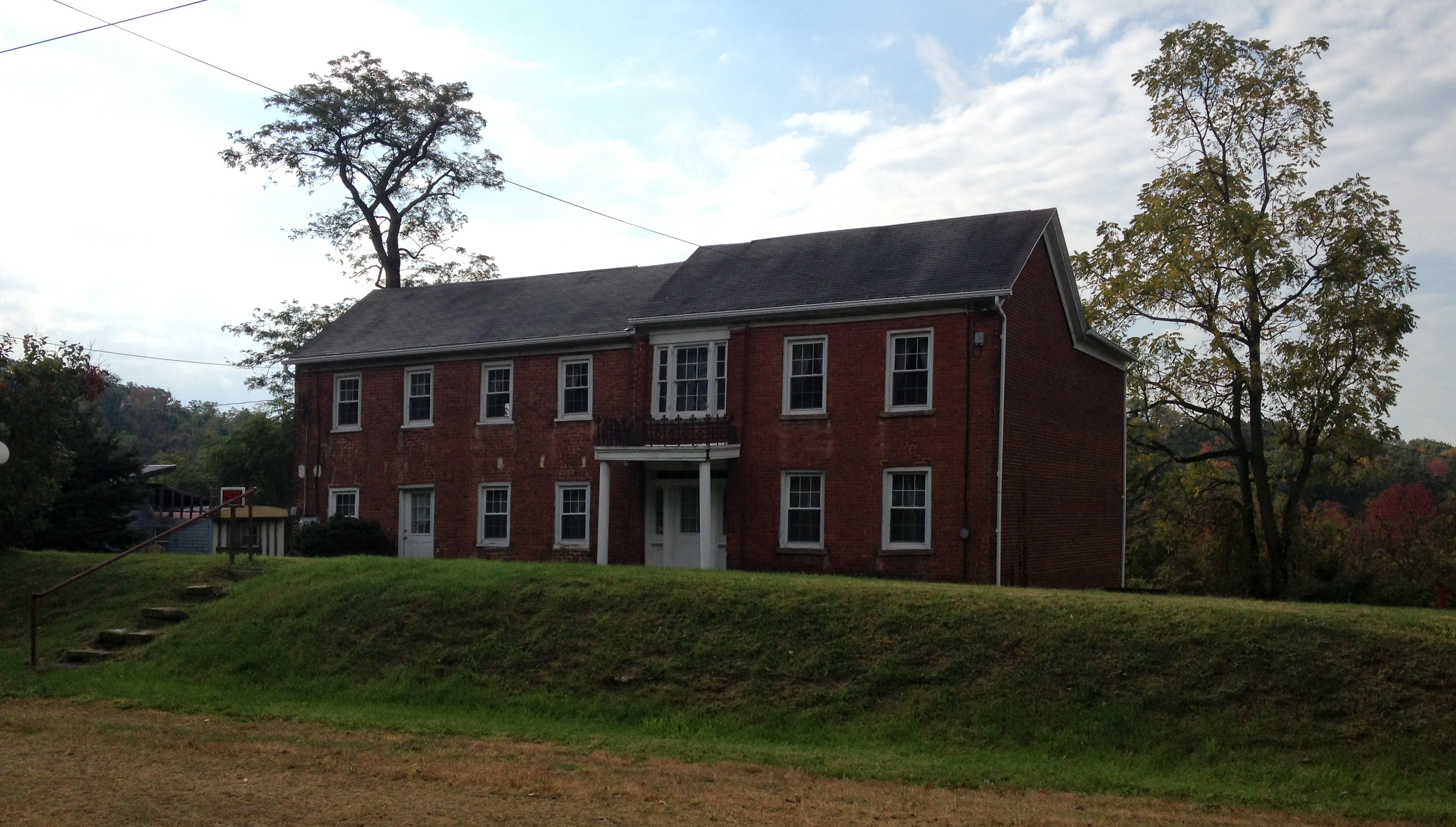

- Location within Pennsylvania Location within the United States
- Location: 438 E. National Pike, Amwell Township, Laboratory, Pennsylvania
- Coordinates: 40°8′58″N 80°11′19″W
- Area: less than one acre
- Built: 1840
- Architectural style: Greek Revival
- MPS: National Road in Pennsylvania MPS
- NRHP reference No.: 96000088
- Added to NRHP: February 16, 1996

Moses Little Tavern is a historic building in Laboratory, Pennsylvania.

It is designated as a historic residential landmark/farmstead by the Washington County History & Landmarks Foundation.
