= Bailey Covered Bridge =

- U.S. National Register of Historic Places
- Washington County History & Landmarks Foundation Landmark
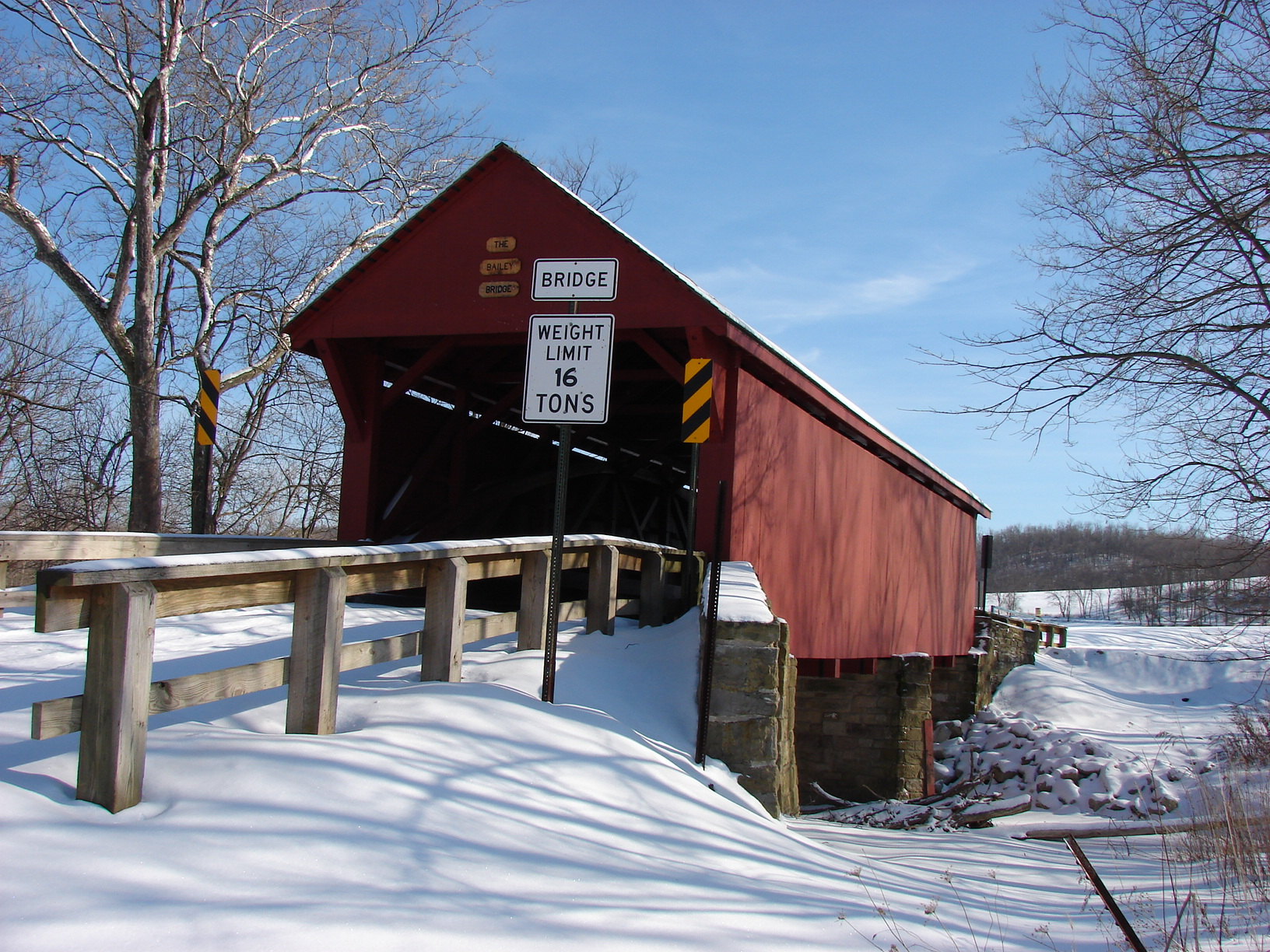
- Comprehensive view of the bridge

- Location within Pennsylvania Location within the United States
- Coordinates: 40°1′14″N 80°11′45″W
- Area: 0.1 acres (0.040 ha)
- Built: 1889
- Architect: Bailey Brothers
- Architectural style: Burr Arch
- MPS: Covered Bridges of Washington and Greene Counties TR
- NRHP reference No.: 79002355
- Added to NRHP: June 22, 1979

The Bailey Covered Bridge is a historic covered bridge in Amity, Washington County, Pennsylvania. It crosses Ten Mile Creek. It is 15 by 66 feet. It was constructed in 1899 on property owned by the Bailey brothers. The original structure was burned in 1994 and replaced with the current structure. It is the last burr arch covered bridge in the county. It is designated as a historic bridge by the Washington County History & Landmarks Foundation.
