= Hughes Covered Bridge =

- U.S. National Register of Historic Places
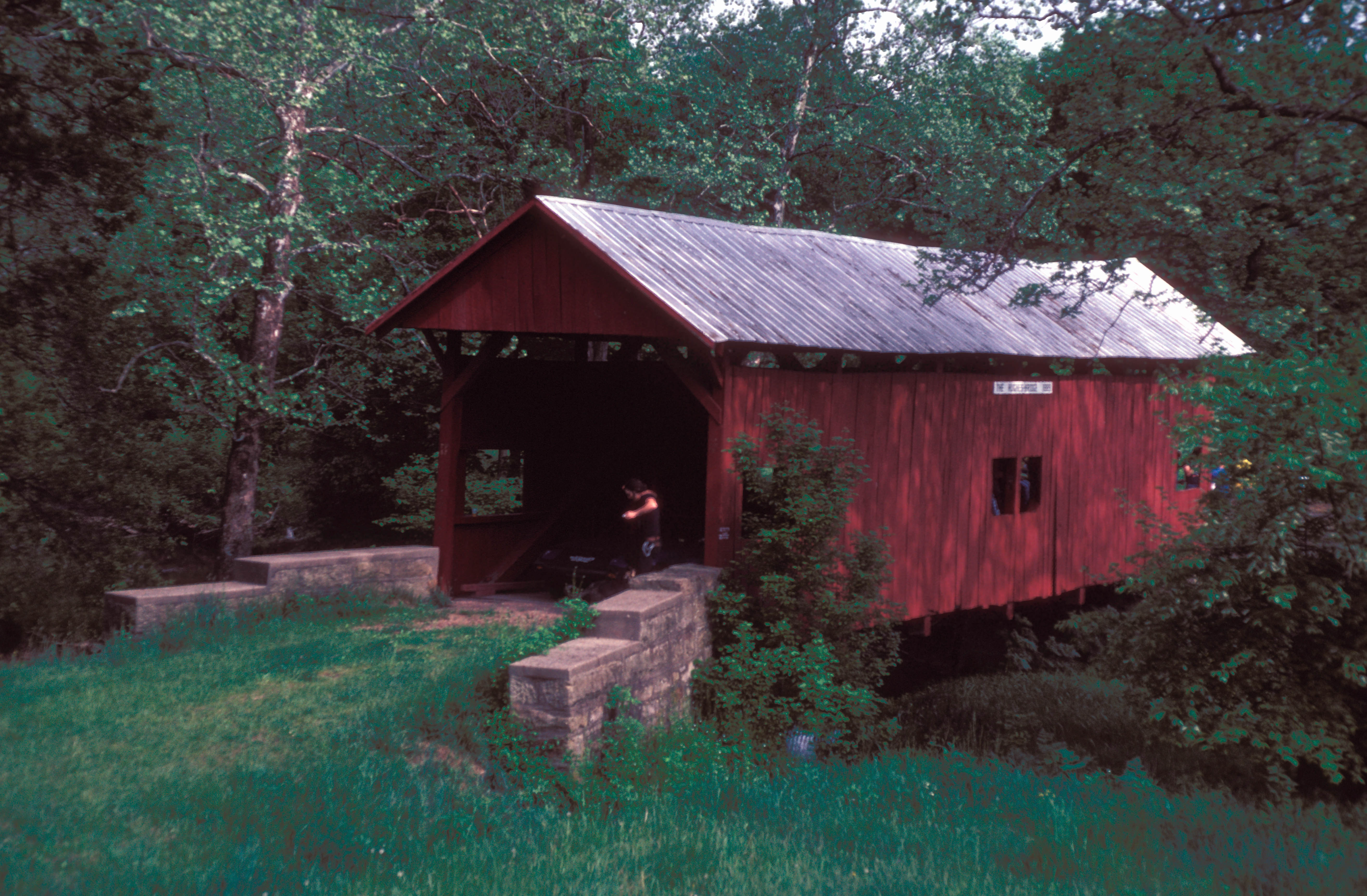

- Location within Pennsylvania Location within the United States
- Coordinates: 40°1′59″N 80°9′37″W
- Area: 0.1 acres (0.040 ha)
- Built: 1889
- Architectural style: Queen post truss
- MPS: Covered Bridges of Washington and Greene Counties TR
- NRHP reference No.: 79002357
- Added to NRHP: June 22, 1979

The Hughes Covered Bridge is a historic covered bridge in Amwell Township, Pennsylvania. Currently, it is used only for foot traffic. The queen post truss bridge is 12'4" wide and 55'6" long.
