= West Bethlehem Township, Pennsylvania =

Township in Pennsylvania, US

Coordinates: 39°59′30″N 80°07′35″W

West Bethlehem Township
- Township
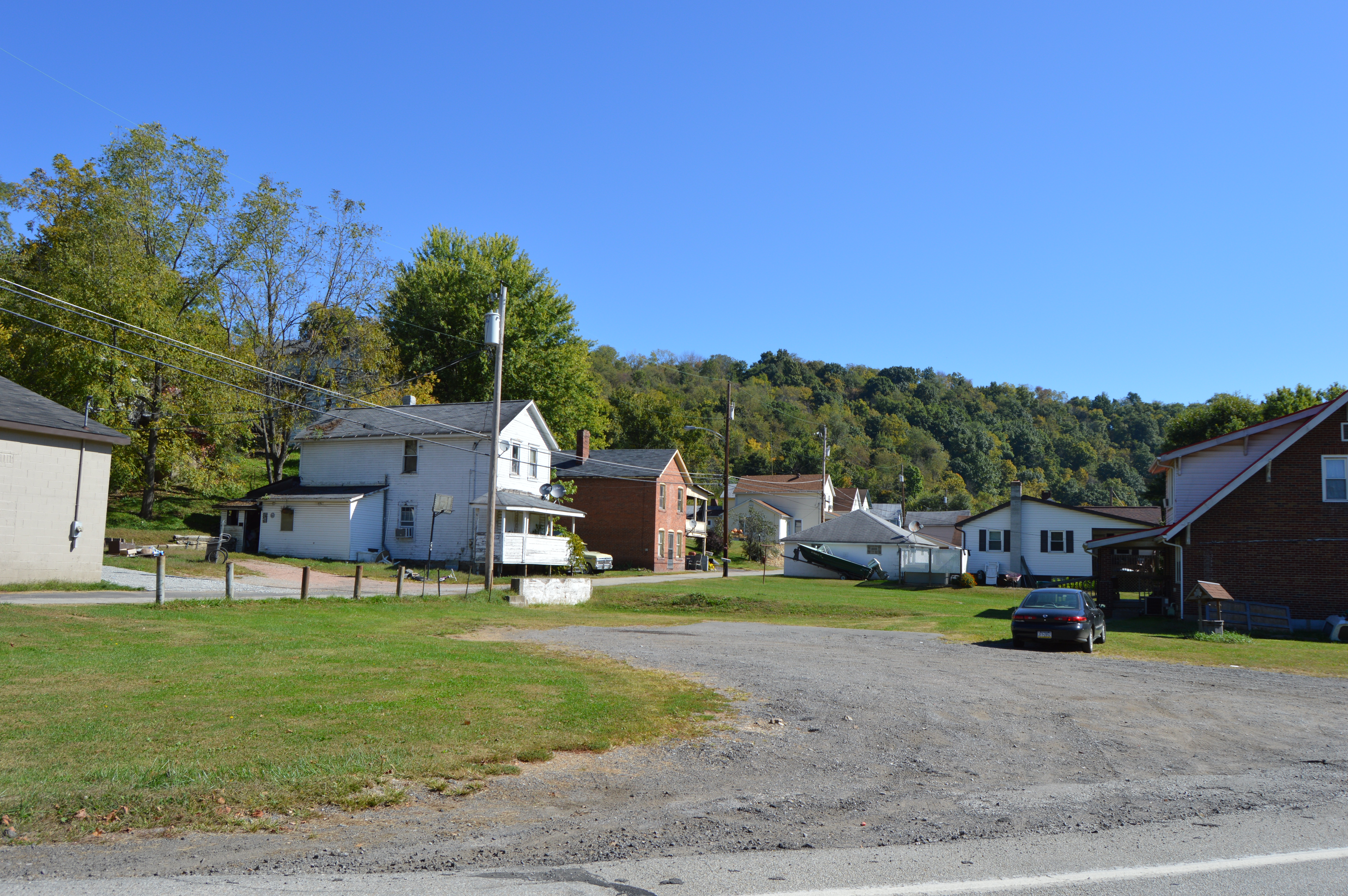
- Village of West Zollarsville

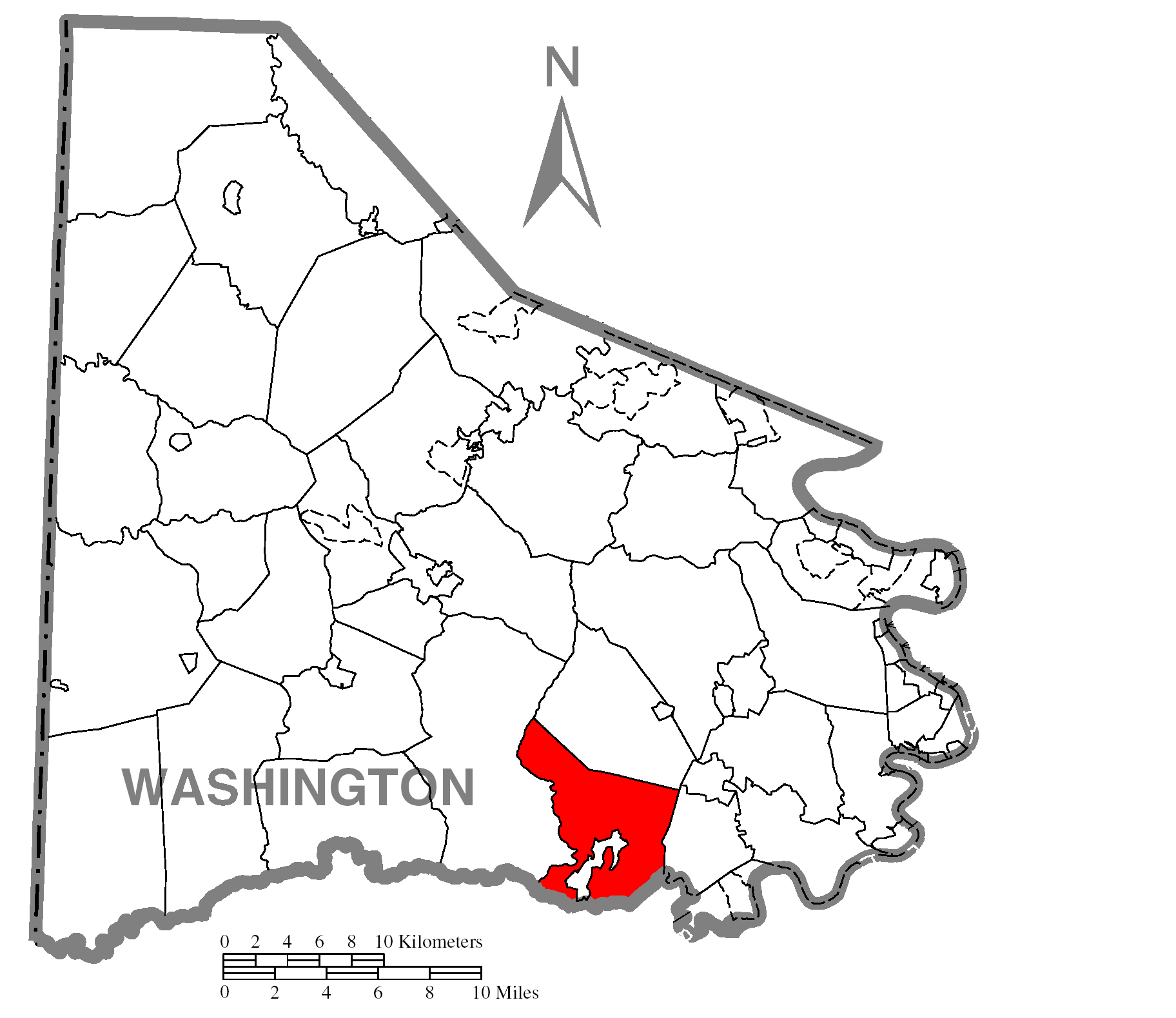
- Location of West Bethlehem Township in Washington County

- Location of Washington County in Pennsylvania
- Country: United States
- State: Pennsylvania
- County: Washington County

Area
  - Total: 22.42 sq mi (58.07 km^{2})
  - Land: 22.42 sq mi (58.07 km^{2})
  - Water: 0 sq mi (0.00 km^{2})

Population (2020)
  - Total: 1,292 ▼
  - Estimate (2021): 1,286
  - Density: 63.9/sq mi (24.66/km^{2})
- Time zone: UTC-4 (EST)
  - Summer (DST): UTC-5 (EDT)
- Area code: 724
- FIPS code: 42-125-82512
- Website: https://westbethlehemtwp.com/

Historical population
| Census | Pop. | Note | %± |
|---|---|---|---|
| 2000 | 1,432 | | — |
| 2010 | 1,460 | | 2.0% |
| 2020 | 1,292 | | −11.5% |
| 2025 (est.) | 1,284 | | −0.6% |
U.S. Decennial Census

West Bethlehem Township is a township in Washington County, Pennsylvania, United States established in 1781. In 1790, it was split into East and West Bethlehem Townships. The Martin's Mill Covered Bridge, Horn Davis Overholtzer Bridge, and Ulery Mill are listed on the National Register of Historic Places. According to the United States Census Bureau, the township has a total area of 22.2 square miles (57.5 km^{2}), all of it land.

== Demographics ==
As of the census of 2000, there were 1,432 people, 590 households, and 431 families living in the township. The population density was 64.5 inhabitants per square mile (24.9/km^{2}). There were 623 housing units at an average density of 28.0 per square mile (10.8/km^{2}). The racial makeup of the township was 98.67% White, 0.56% African American, 0.14% Asian, 0.07% from other races, and 0.56% from two or more races.

There were 590 households, out of which 28.8% had children under the age of 18 living with them, 57.6% were married couples living together, 11.7% had a female householder with no husband present, and 26.9% were non-families. 24.7% of all households were made up of individuals, and 13.6% had someone living alone who was 65 years of age or older. The average household size was 2.42 and the average family size was 2.86.

In the township the population was spread out, with 21.9% under the age of 18, 6.9% from 18 to 24, 27.0% from 25 to 44, 27.4% from 45 to 64, and 16.7% who were 65 years of age or older. The median age was 41 years. For every 100 females, there were 95.4 males. For every 100 females age 18 and over, there were 93.4 males.

The median income for a household in the township was $32,500, and the median income for a family was $40,909. Males had a median income of $31,953 versus $22,721 for females. The per capita income for the township was $15,834. About 13.4% of families and 16.5% of the population were below the poverty line, including 27.6% of those under age 18 and 12.4% of those age 65 or over.

The population was 1,460 at the 2010 census.
