= Pennsylvania Route 980 =

State highway in Pennsylvania, US

Pennsylvania Route 980

Route information
- Maintained by PennDOT
- Length: 17.0 mi (27.4 km)

Major junctions
- South end: PA 519 in North Strabane
- PA 50 in Cecil Township
- North end: US 22 in North Fayette Township

Location
- Country: United States
- State: Pennsylvania
- Counties: Washington, Allegheny

Highway system
- Pennsylvania State Route System; Interstate; US; State; Scenic; Legislative
← PA 979	→ PA 981

Pennsylvania Route 980 (PA 980) is a north–south 17-mile-long (27 km) state highway located in Washington and Allegheny counties in Pennsylvania. The highway begins at PA 519 south of Canonsburg. The northern terminus is at an interchange with U.S. Route 22 (US 22) in North Fayette Township. PA 980 passes through the towns of Canonsburg, Venice, and McDonald. From West Pike Street in Canonsburg to US 22, PA 980 runs concurrently with BicyclePA Route A.

== Route description ==
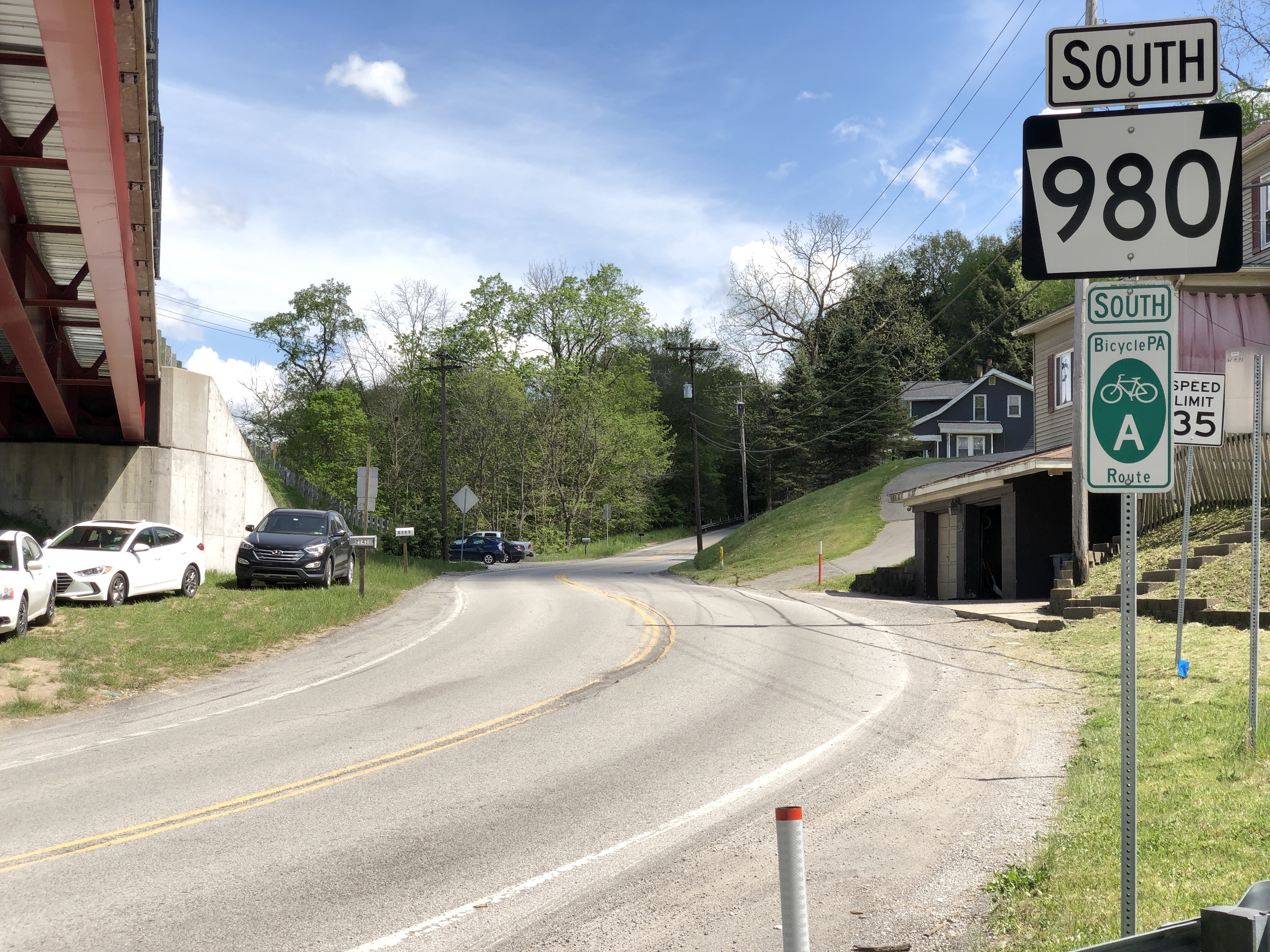
PA 980 southbound past PA 50 in Cecil Township

PA 980 begins at PA 519 in North Strabane Township. From there, the route runs northbound through the borough of Canonsburg, intersecting with Morganza Road which provides access to Exit 45 of I-79. PA 980 then turns northwest into Cecil Township, where it passes under the PA 576 toll road, and continues through the borough of McDonald and Robinson Township. In Robinson Township, Fort Cherry Road and Beech Hollow Road head west to provide access to the PA 576 toll road. Entering Allegheny County, the last 0.2 mile of PA 980 runs through North Fayette Township from the county line to its northern terminus at US 22.

== History ==
PA 980 was signed in 1928. However, it wasn't until 1932 until it was paved from Imperial to Carnot. In 1936, the route was moved from Imperial to Carnot, to its current location. That route is now currently PA 978. In 1951, its northern terminus was moved from US 30, the Lincoln Highway in Clinton to the William Penn Highway. In 1965, its northern terminus was moved from the William Penn Highway to its current location at the junction with US 22.

== Major intersections ==
County	Location	mi	km	Destinations	Notes
Washington	North Strabane Township	0.0	0.0	PA 519 to I-79 / US 19 – Eighty Four, Houston, Washington, Pittsburgh, Canonsburg Hospital	Southern terminus
Washington	Canonsburg	1.9	3.1	To I-79 / US 19	Access via Morganza Road
Washington	Cecil Township	7.3	11.7	PA 50 (Millers Run Road) – Cecil, Hickory	
Washington	Robinson Township			To PA Turnpike 576	Access via Fort Cherry Road
Washington	Robinson Township			To PA Turnpike 576	Access via Beech Hollow Road
Allegheny	North Fayette Township	17.0	27.4	US 22 – Pittsburgh, Weirton, Clinton	Interchange; northern terminus
1.000 mi = 1.609 km; 1.000 km = 0.621 mi
