= Pennsylvania Route 519 =

State highway in Washington County, Pennsylvania, US

Pennsylvania Route 519
- PA 519 in red and PA 519 Truck in blue

Route information
- Maintained by PennDOT
- Length: 18.7 mi (30.1 km)

Major junctions
- South end: US 40 in North Bethlehem Township
- North end: PA 50 in Mt. Pleasant Township

Location
- Country: United States
- State: Pennsylvania
- Counties: Washington

Highway system
- Pennsylvania State Route System; Interstate; US; State; Scenic; Legislative
← PA 513	→ PA 520

Pennsylvania Route 519 (PA 519) runs in a north–south route through central Washington County connecting the Glyde area of North Bethlehem Township at the southern terminus (US Route 40) with the Hickory area of Mt. Pleasant Township at the north end (PA Route 50).

The road intersects with I-70 in Somerset Township (Eighty Four area) and Interstate 79 in North Strabane Township near Houston. It also intersects with US Route 19 in North Strabane Township.

== Route description ==
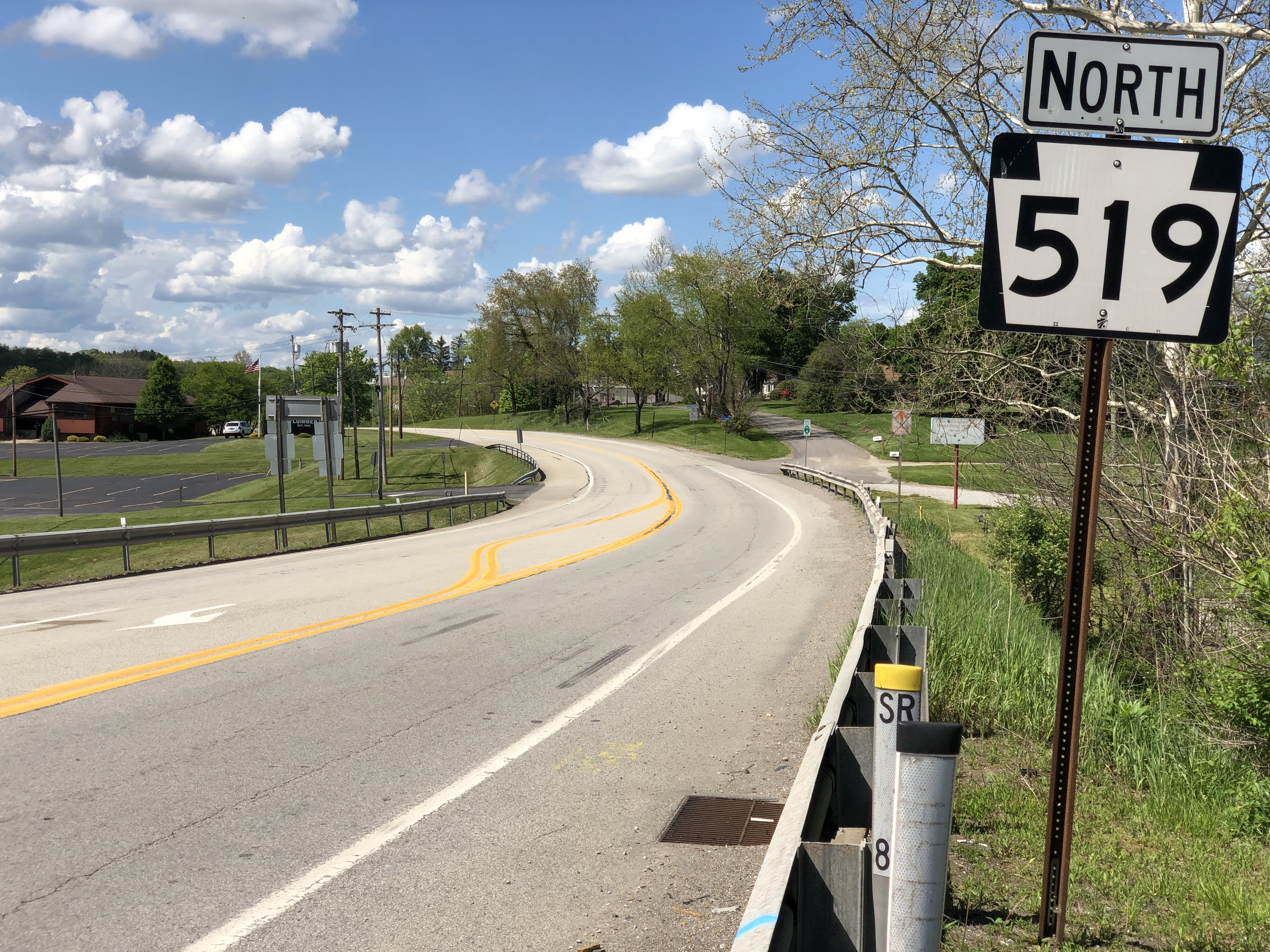
PA 519 northbound past PA 136 in Eighty Four

PA 519 begins at an intersection with US 40 in the community of Glyde in North Bethlehem Township, heading north on a two-lane undivided road. The route passes through wooded areas with some farms and development, crossing into Somerset Township and reaching an interchange with I-70. Past this interchange, the road runs through more rural areas before reaching the community of Eighty Four. Here, the road passes homes and businesses as it comes to an intersection with PA 136. After this intersection, PA 519 heads into North Strabane Township and passes areas of commercial development a short distance to the east of the Allegheny Valley Railroad's W&P Subdivision line, running through Wylandville. The route curves northeast into areas of farms before turning northwest and passing through the residential community of Gambles. The road crosses the W&P Subdivision and continues northwest through farmland and woodland with some residential development. PA 519 reaches an interchange with US 19, with a park and ride lot located within the northwestern quadrant, and comes to an intersection with PA 980 a short distance later.

At this point, the route turns to the west near areas of residential and commercial development, coming to an interchange with I-79. The road becomes Hill Church Houston Road here and heads northwest through commercial areas, crossing the Pittsburgh and Ohio Central Railroad and Chartiers Creek. After the latter, PA 519 enters the borough of Houston and becomes South Main Street, passing homes and businesses. In the commercial center of Houston, the route briefly turns south onto West Pike Street before heading west on Western Avenue past more residences. The road forms the border between Houston to the north and Chartiers Township to the south before fully entering Chartiers Township. PA 519 continues northwest through areas of farmland and woodland with occasional residential and commercial development, passing through McConnells Mills and Export. The road turns more to the north and enters forested areas, heading into Mount Pleasant Township. The route passes through the residential community of Westland and comes into a mix of farm fields and woods. PA 519 turns northwest and reaches its northern terminus at PA 50.

== History ==
From 1936 to 1941, the original PA 519 was an Allegheny/Washington County route, running for 14.2 miles from the intersection of Saw Mill Run Blvd. and West Liberty Avenue (bordering the Pittsburgh neighborhoods of Brookline and Beechview) to U.S. 19 (Morganza Road) in Morganza/North Strabane Township. In 1941, PA 519 was "swapped" with what was U.S. 19 at that time, now running along Morganza Road in North Strabane, joining then-PA 28 in South Fayette Township and ending at Crafton Boulevard/Noblestown Road (then-U.S. 22/U.S. 30) in Crafton Heights (PA 28/Noblestown Road continued with a right turn from here). In 1947, PA 519 was extended to its current southern terminus at U.S. 40 in Glyde. In 1954, the northern terminus was truncated to the intersection of Washington Ave. and PA 28 (Miller's Run Road, changed to PA 50 in 1961) in South Fayette Township. In 1972, the northern terminus (including the remaining segment in Allegheny County) was moved one last time to its current location at PA 50 in Mount Pleasant Township.

== Major intersections ==
The entire route is in Washington County.

Location	mi	km	Destinations	Notes
North Bethlehem Township	0.0	0.0	US 40 (East National Pike) – Scenery Hill, Washington	Southern terminus
Somerset Township	2.2	3.5	I-70 – Washington, Belle Vernon	Exit 25 (I-70)
Somerset Township	4.1	6.6	PA 136 – Washington, Monongahela	
North Strabane Township	9.7	15.6	US 19 (Washington Road) – Pittsburgh, Washington	Interchange
North Strabane Township	9.9	15.9	PA 980 north (South Central Avenue)	Southern terminus of PA 980
North Strabane Township	11.0	17.7	I-79 (Raymond P. Shafer Highway) – Pittsburgh, Washington	Exit 43 (I-79)
Mount Pleasant Township	18.7	30.1	PA 50 (Main Street) – Avella, Venice	Northern terminus
1.000 mi = 1.609 km; 1.000 km = 0.621 mi

== PA 519 Truck ==
Pennsylvania Route 519 Truck
- Location: Bridgeville, Pennsylvania
- Length: 21.5 mi (34.6 km)

Pennsylvania Route 519 Truck is a 21.5 mile truck route bypassing a weight-restricted bridge over a branch over Chartiers Run on PA 519 in Chartiers Township, on which trucks over 33 tons and combination loads over 37 tons are prohibited. It was signed in 2013. PA 519 Truck begins at its parent route at Exit 43 of I-79 in Houston, following I-79 north for 10.7 miles. The truck route runs concurrently with PA 50 west for 11.5 miles to PA 519's northern terminus in Mount Pleasant Township.

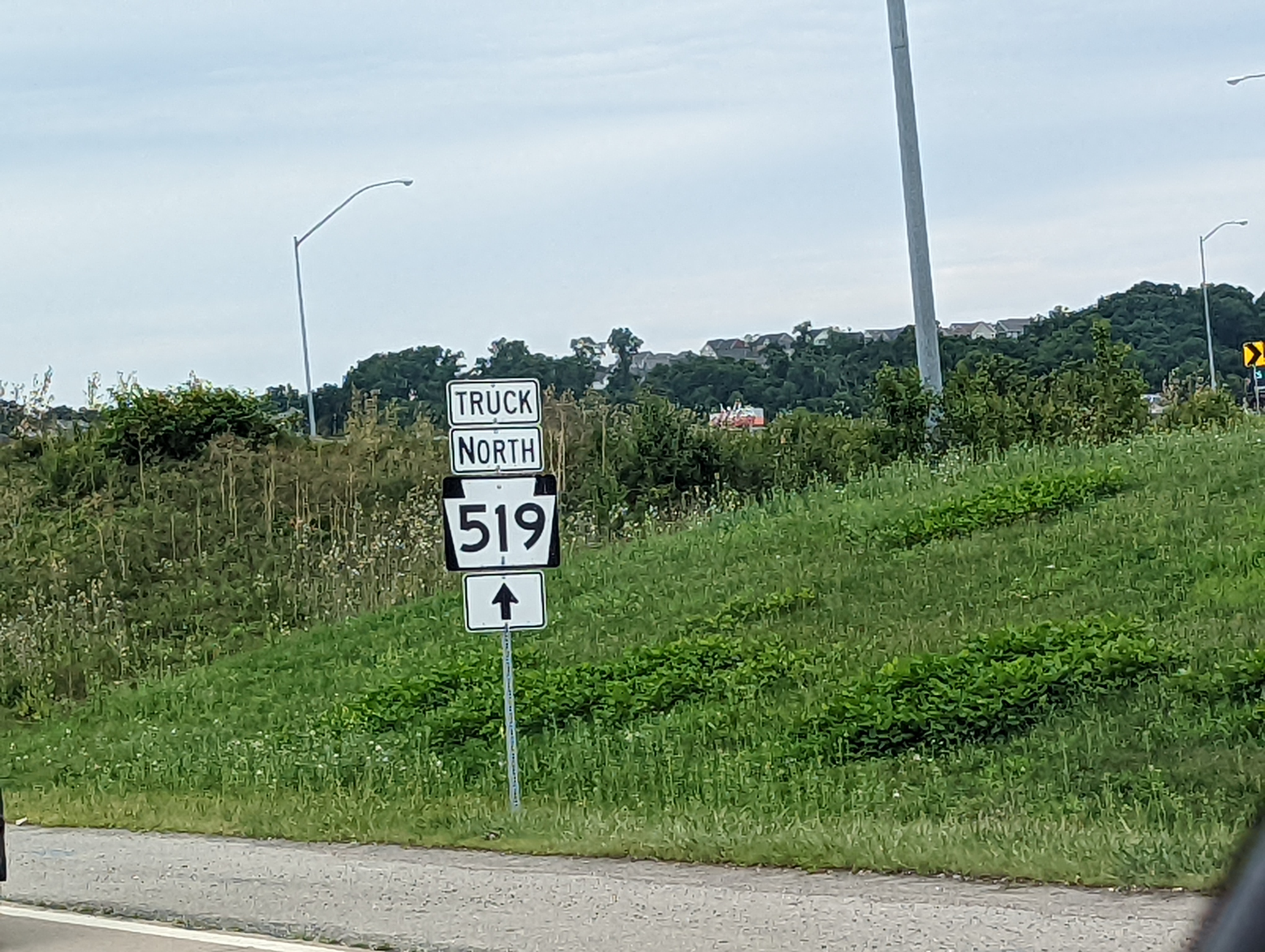
PA 519 Truck on slip ramp to I-79 northbound.
