= Gambles, Pennsylvania =

Unincorporated community in Pennsylvania, US

- Unincorporated community
- Location within Pennsylvania
- Coordinates: 40°12′38″N 80°07′51″W
- Country: United States
- State: Pennsylvania
- County: Washington
- Elevation: 1,007 ft (307 m)
- Time zone: UTC-5 (Eastern (EST))
  - Summer (DST): UTC-4 (EDT)
- Area code: 724
- GNIS feature ID: 1175405

Gambles is an unincorporated community in North Strabane Township, Washington County, Pennsylvania, United States. Gambles is located on Pennsylvania Route 519, 6.6 miles (10.6 km) east-northeast of the county seat of Washington.
