= Pennsylvania Route 19 =

Pennsylvania Route 19 may refer to:

- Pennsylvania Route 19 (1920s)
- U.S. Route 19 in Pennsylvania
