= Pennsylvania Route 505 =

State highway in Erie County, Pennsylvania, US

Pennsylvania Route 505

Route information
- Maintained by PennDOT
- Length: 2.847 mi (4.582 km)
- Existed: 1932–present

Major junctions
- South end: PA 97 in Millcreek Township
- North end: US 20 in Erie

Location
- Country: United States
- State: Pennsylvania
- Counties: Erie

Highway system
- Pennsylvania State Route System; Interstate; US; State; Scenic; Legislative
← PA 504	→ PA 507

Pennsylvania Route 505 (PA 505) is a 2.8-mile-long (4.5 km) state highway located in northwest Pennsylvania. The route is a continuation of PA 97 along the Perry Highway and ends at U.S. Route 20 (US 20) in Erie as Glenwood Park Avenue.

== Route description ==
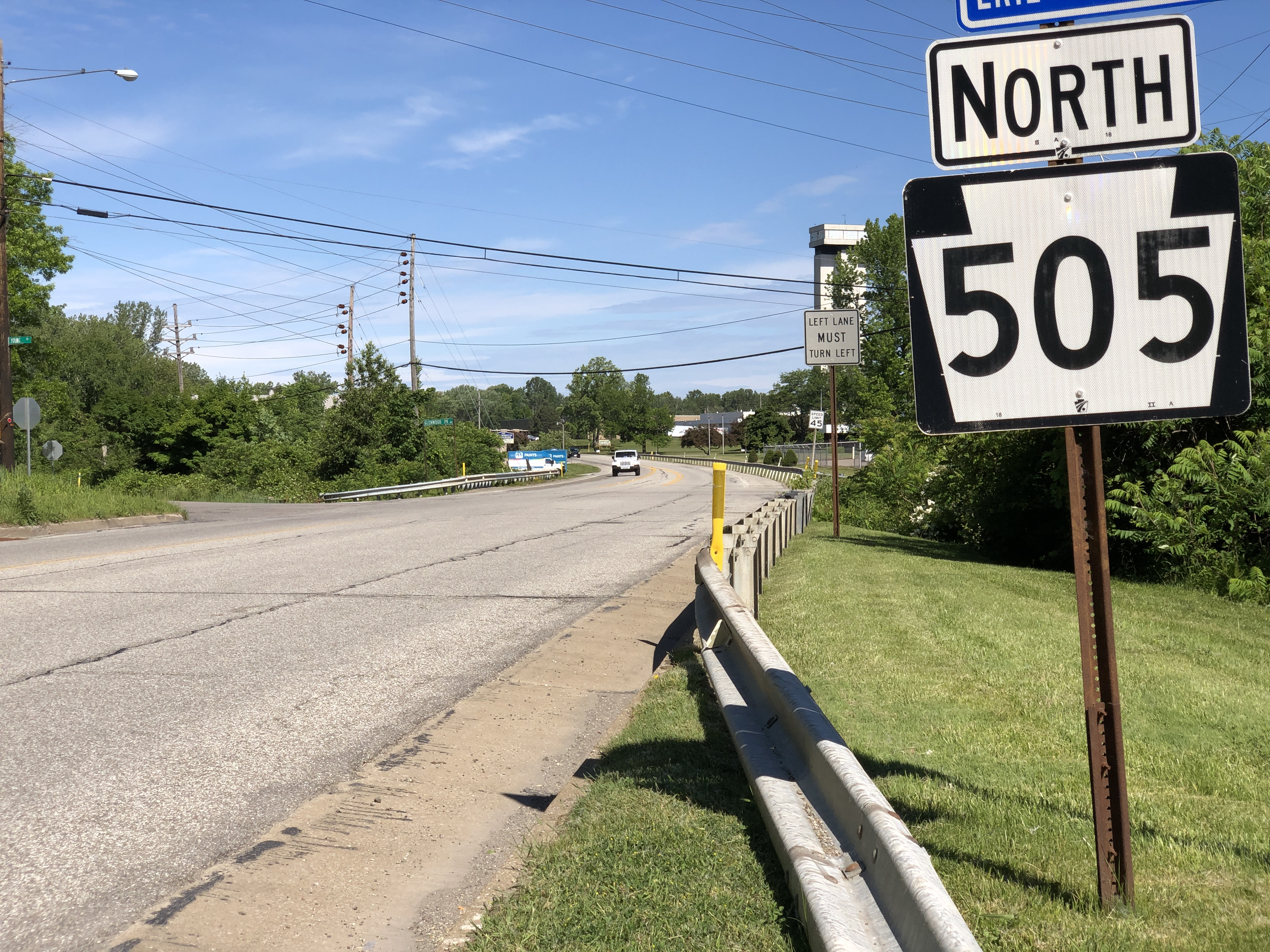
PA 505 northbound past PA 97 in Millcreek Township

PA 505 is a continuation of the Perry Highway from PA 97 in Millcreek Township. In the suburbs of the city of Erie, PA 505 runs northward as Perry Highway (named for Oliver Hazard Perry, a hero of the Battle of Lake Erie) and Glenwood Park Avenue through residential areas, between PA 97 and US 19. In Glenwood Park, the route passes by the Erie Zoo, running towards downtown Erie. North of the park, the highway runs through residential areas and ends in the downtown district of the city, at an intersection with US 20.

== History ==
PA 505 was formed in the late 1920s along what is now the northernmost segment of PA 97. By 1940, the route was moved to its current designation.

== Major intersections ==
The entire route is in Erie County.

Location	mi	km	Destinations	Notes
Millcreek Township	0.000	0.000	PA 97 (Perry Highway/Old French Road) to I-90	Southern terminus; former designation of US 6
Erie	2.847	4.582	US 20 (26th Street) to US 19 / State Street	Northern terminus
1.000 mi = 1.609 km; 1.000 km = 0.621 mi
