= U.S. Route 19 in Pennsylvania =

Highway in Pennsylvania

U.S. Route 19
- US 19 highlighted in red

Route information
- Maintained by PennDOT
- Length: 195 mi (314 km)

Major junctions
- South end: US 19 at the West Virginia border in Mount Morris
- I-70 / I-79 in Washington; I-376 / US 22 / US 30 / PA 51 in Pittsburgh; I-279 in Pittsburgh; I-76 / Penna Turnpike in Cranberry Township; US 422 near New Castle; I-80 near Mercer; US 62 / PA 58 / PA 258 in Mercer; US 6 / US 322 / PA 98 near Meadville; I-90 near Erie
- North end: US 20 in Erie

Location
- Country: United States
- State: Pennsylvania
- Counties: Greene, Washington, Allegheny, Butler, Lawrence, Mercer, Crawford, Erie

Highway system
- United States Numbered Highway System; List; Special; Divided; Pennsylvania State Route System; Interstate; US; State; Scenic; Legislative
← PA 18	→ PA 19

U.S. Route 19 (US 19) in Pennsylvania is closely paralleled by Interstate 79 (I-79) for its entire length. US 19 enters Pennsylvania from the West Virginia state line in Greene County near Mount Morris. Its northern terminus is at US 20 in the city of Erie. Part of it is named for Commodore Oliver Hazard Perry, hero of the Battle of Lake Erie.

== Route ==
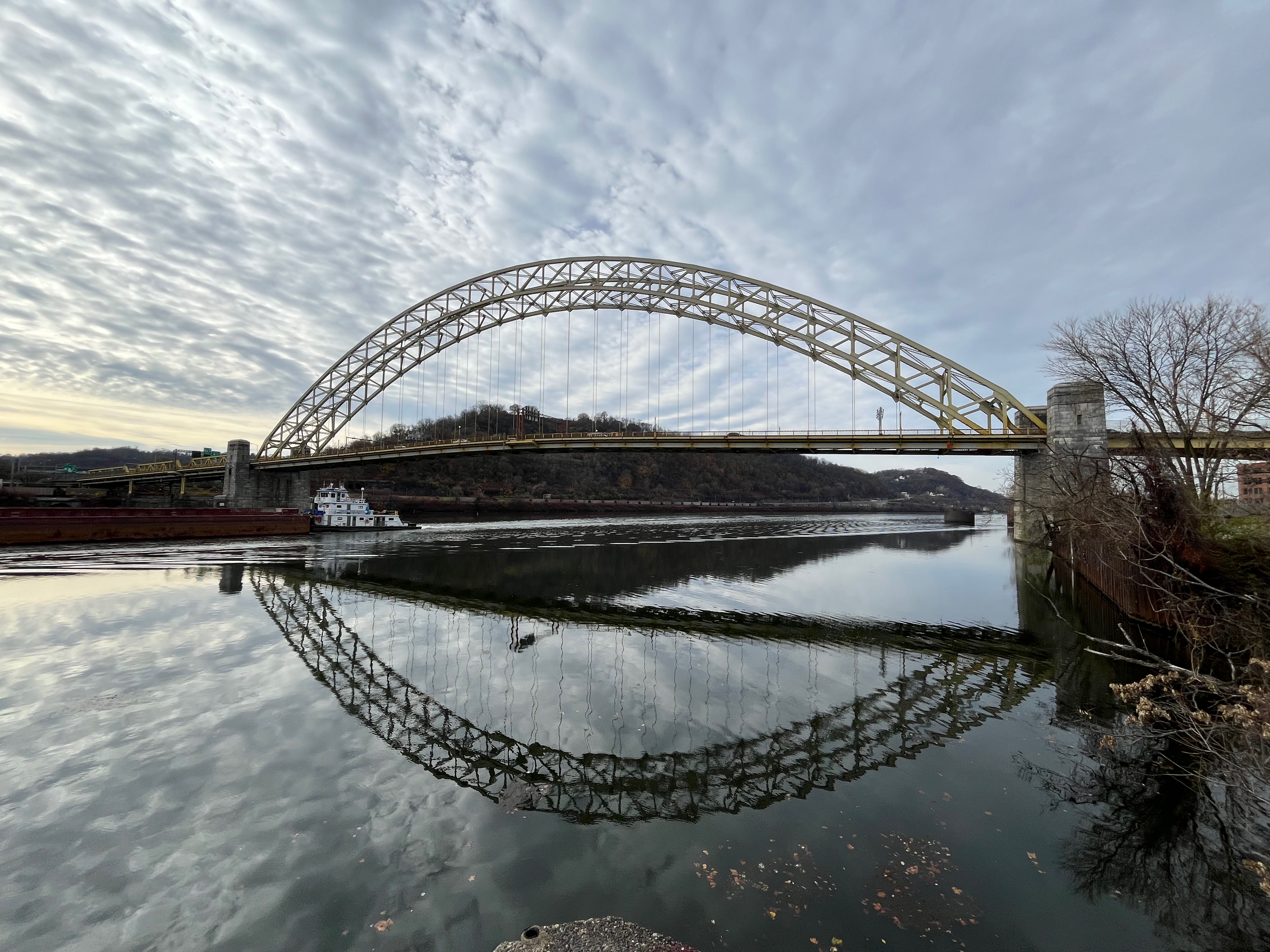
U.S. 19 crosses the Ohio River over the West End Bridge, the most upstream bridge on the river, just below its formation at the confluence of the Allegheny River and Monongahela River.

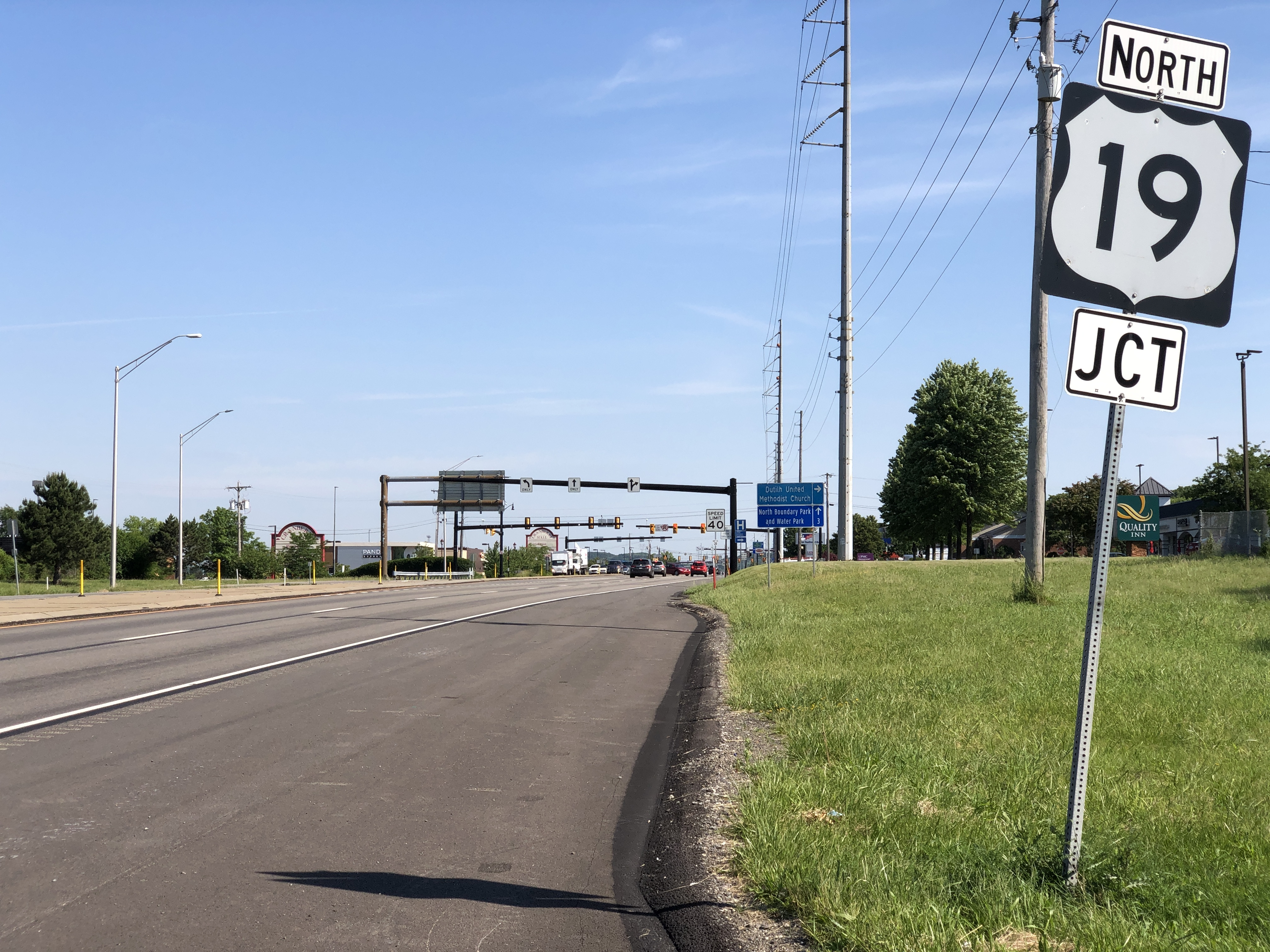
US 19 northbound past interchange with I-76 (Pennsylvania Turnpike) and I-79 in Cranberry Township

In northern Washington County, US 19 was modernized after the former Pittsburgh Railways Interurban (PRCo) trolley service was discontinued in August 1953. Initially, US 19 ran parallel to the trolley line and later expanded over the tracks through part of Mt. Lebanon in southern Allegheny County.

US 19 then proceeds north through Pittsburgh's North Side, West View, Perrysville, Ross Township, McCandless, and Wexford, where it is referred to as Perry Highway. In Cranberry Township, it connects with I-79, the Pennsylvania Turnpike (I-76), and Pennsylvania Route 228 (PA 228). Continuing through Mercer and Crawford counties, the route meets its terminus at a junction with US 20 in Erie. The US 19 Truck designation exists in Pittsburgh, running from Wexford to Mt. Lebanon. Although both of that route's terminuses are with the regular US 19, the two routes also intersect near the Fort Pitt Tunnel on Pittsburgh's West End.

== History ==
US 19 in Pennsylvania has maintained a similar alignment for much of its history. In 1928, US 19 was moved to its current route between Pittsburgh and Meadville. The West End Bridge in Pittsburgh was completed in 1932, and US 19 was realigned to cross the bridge. In 1936, US 19 was moved to its current alignment between Zelienople and Harmony. Through the 1940s and 1950s, different parts of US 19 were widened.

In 1987, the Phase One project started to connect two sections of Ohio River Boulevard near Western Avenue and Chateau Street. Phase Two of the project included a new interchange between the PA 65 expressway (concurrent with US 19 west of the interchange) and the West End Bridge. The bridge was closed for two years for construction but reopened in 1991, while construction finished in 1992.

In 2003, the Pennsylvania Department of Transportation (PennDOT) started a project to build a US 19 tunnel under the Norfolk Southern Railway, as well as align the West End Bypass with the West End Circle, the intersection of US 19, PA 51, PA 60, and PA 837. The project was completed in 2010.

In 2016, a diverging diamond interchange was built at the intersection of US 19 and I-70/I-79 in South Strabane Township.

PennDOT started construction on a multilane roundabout at the intersection of US 19, US 6, US 322, and PA 98 in Vernon Township, near Meadville. Construction was expected to be completed in October 2019.

PennDOT has also started construction on an intersection improvement project at the northern intersection of US 19 and PA 97. PA 97 was realigned to meet US 19 at a 90-degree angle, and new left turn lanes and traffic signals were installed. Construction was expected to be completed in October 2019.

== Major intersections ==
County	Location	mi	km	Destinations	Notes
Greene	Perry Township	0.0	0.0	US 19 south (Blue Horizon Drive) – Morgantown	US 19 enters Pennsylvania from West Virginia
Greene	Morrisville	15.4	24.8	PA 21 east (Montgomery Street) to PA 188 / I-79	Southern terminus of PA 21 concurrency
Greene	Waynesburg	16.5	26.6	PA 218 south (Morgan Street)	Northern terminus of PA 218
Greene	Waynesburg	16.8	27.0	PA 21 west (High Street)	Northern terminus of PA 21 concurrency
Greene	Washington Township	21.9	35.2	PA 221 (Dunn Station Road/Lippencott Road) to I-79 north – Prosperity, Jefferson	PA 221 provides access to I-79 north; I-79 exit 19
Greene	Washington Township	22.1	35.6	I-79 south – Waynesburg, Morgantown	I-79 exit 19
Washington	South Strabane Township	33.6	54.1	I-79 – Washington, Waynesburg	I-79 exit 30
Washington	South Strabane Township	37.0	59.5	US 40 east (Maiden Street)	Southern terminus of US 40 concurrency
Washington	Washington	39.0	62.8	US 40 west (Maiden Street)	Northern terminus of US 40 concurrency
Washington	Washington	39.2	63.1	PA 136 (Beau Street)	
Washington	South Strabane Township	40.6	65.3	I-70 / I-79 – New Stanton, Morgantown, Wheeling, Pittsburgh	I-70 exit 19; diverging diamond interchange
Washington	South Strabane Township	43.3	69.7	Racetrack Road to I-79 – Hollywood Casino at The Meadows, Tanger Outlets Pittsburgh	
Washington	North Strabane Township	45.5	73.2	PA 519 / PA 980 to I-79 – Canonsburg, Eighty Four, Houston	Interchange
Washington	Peters Township	49.0	78.9	Valley Brook Road / Old Washington Road – Lawrence, McMurray	Interchange
Allegheny	Upper St. Clair	55.6	89.5	Orange Belt (McLaughlin Run Road / McMurray Road) to PA 50 – Upper Saint Clair, Bridgeville, Bethel Park	Interchange
Allegheny	Mt. Lebanon	57.6	92.7	Yellow Belt (Connor Road / Gilkeson Road) to PA 88 – Bridgeville	Southern terminus of Yellow Belt concurrency
Allegheny	Mt. Lebanon	57.8	93.0	Mt. Lebanon Boulevard – Castle Shannon	
Allegheny	Mt. Lebanon	58.1	93.5	US 19 Truck north (Washington Road)	Southern terminus of US 19 Truck
Allegheny	Mt. Lebanon	59.1	95.1	PA 121 north / Yellow Belt (Cochran Road)	Southern terminus of PA 121, northern terminus of Yellow Belt concurrency
Allegheny	Pittsburgh	60.6	97.5	Blue Belt (Potomac Avenue)	
Allegheny	Pittsburgh	62.8	101.1	I-376 / US 22 / US 30 / US 19 Truck north (Penn-Lincoln Parkway) – Carnegie, Airport, West End, Monroeville US 19 Truck south / PA 51 south (Saw Mill Run Boulevard) – Uniontown	I-376/US 22/US 30 exit 69, southern terminus of PA 51 concurrency
Allegheny	Pittsburgh	64.1	103.2	PA 51 north – McKees Rocks, West End PA 60 north – Crafton PA 837 south (Carson Street) to I-376 east – Downtown	Interchange, northern terminus of PA 51 concurrency, northern terminus of PA 837, southern terminus of PA 60, West End Circle
Allegheny	Ohio River	64.3	103.5	West End Bridge	
Allegheny	Pittsburgh	64.6	104.0	PA 65 south to US 19 Truck north / I-279 – Downtown, North Shore	Interchange, southern terminus of PA 65 concurrency
Allegheny	Pittsburgh	65.3	105.1	PA 65 north (Ohio River Boulevard) / California Avenue	Interchange, northern terminus of PA 65 concurrency
Allegheny	Pittsburgh	68.6	110.4	Blue Belt (Bascom Avenue)	Southern terminus of Blue Belt concurrency
Allegheny	Pittsburgh	69.0	111.0	Blue Belt (Ivory Avenue) – Millvale	Northern terminus of Blue Belt concurrency
Allegheny	Pittsburgh	69.4	111.7	I-279 – Pittsburgh, Erie	Interchange, I-279 exit 5 via Cemetery Lane
Allegheny	Pittsburgh	69.9	112.5	I-279 south	HOV only
Allegheny	Ross Township	73.0	117.5	Green Belt (Three Degree Road) – Allison Park	Southern terminus of Green Belt concurrency
Allegheny	Ross Township	73.0	117.5	Green Belt (Sewickley Oakmont Road) to PA 65 – Emsworth	Northern terminus of Green Belt concurrency
Allegheny	McCandless Township	75.6	121.7	Yellow Belt (West Ingomar Road / Ingomar Road) to PA 65 – North Park	
Allegheny	McCandless Township	76.2	122.6	US 19 Truck south (McKnight Road)	Northern terminus of US 19 Truck, southbound access only
Allegheny	Franklin Park	78.9	127.0	PA 910 / Orange Belt (Wexford Road)	Interchange
Allegheny	Marshall Township	81.5	131.2	Red Belt (Warrendale Bayne Road) to PA 8 / PA 65	
Allegheny	Marshall Township	82.2	132.3	I-79 south – Pittsburgh	Southbound access only; I-79 exit 75
Butler	Cranberry Township	83.3	134.1	I-76 / Penna Turnpike – Youngstown, OH, Harrisburg	I-76 / Penna Turnpike exit 28 (Cranberry)
Butler	Cranberry Township	83.8	134.9	PA 228 east (Mars-Criders Road) to I-79 – Mars	Western terminus of PA 228
Butler	Jackson Township	88.8	142.9	PA 528 north (Lindsay Road) to I-79 south – Pittsburgh, Evans City	Southern terminus of PA 528
Butler	Zelienople	90.2	145.2	I-79 north – Erie	No southbound exit, I-79 exit 85
Butler	Zelienople	91.6	147.4	PA 68 west (Beaver Street) – Rochester	Southern terminus of PA 68 concurrency
Butler	Zelienople	91.9	147.9	PA 288 west / PA 588 west (New Castle Street) – Ellwood City, Beaver Falls	Eastern terminus of PA 288
Butler	Zelienople	92.0	148.1	PA 68 east (Grandview Avenue) to I-79 south – Evans City, Butler	Northern terminus of PA 68 concurrency
Butler	Portersville	101.4	163.2	PA 488 east (Portersville Road) to I-79 – Prospect	Eastern terminus of PA 488 concurrency
Butler	Portersville	101.6	163.5	PA 488 west (Portersville Road) – Ellwood City	Western terminus of PA 488 concurrency
Butler	Muddy Creek Township	104.7	168.5	US 422 (New Castle Road) – New Castle, Butler	Interchange
Lawrence	Scott Township	105.8	170.3	PA 108 (Harlansburg Road) – New Castle, Slippery Rock	
Lawrence	Scott Township	106.1	170.8	PA 956 north – Neshannock Falls, New Wilmington	Southern terminus of PA 956
Mercer	Springfield Township	112.5	181.1	PA 208 west (Leesburg Volant Road) – Volant, New Wilmington	Southern terminus of PA 208 concurrency
Mercer	Springfield Township	112.6	181.2	PA 208 east (Leesburg Grove City Road) to I-79 – Grove City	Northern terminus of PA 208 concurrency
Mercer	Findley Township	116.9	188.1	I-80 – Sharon, Clarion	I-80 exit 15
Mercer	Mercer	119.2	191.8	PA 58 east / PA 258 south (South Diamond Street) – Grove City	One-way eastbound, southern terminus of PA 58 eastbound/PA 258 southbound concurrency
Mercer	Mercer	119.21	191.85	US 62 south / PA 258 north (West Market Street) to PA 158 / PA 318 – Sharon	Northern terminus of PA 258 southbound concurrency, southern terminus of US 62/PA 258 northbound concurrency
Mercer	Mercer	119.22	191.87	PA 58 west / PA 258 north (North Diamond Street)	One-way westbound, northern terminus of PA 258 northbound concurrency, southern terminus of PA 58 westbound concurrency
Mercer	Mercer	119.4	192.2	PA 58 west (Greenville Avenue) – Greenville	Northern terminus of PA 58 concurrency
Mercer	Mercer	119.8	192.8	US 62 north (Franklin Road) to I-79 – Franklin	Northern terminus of US 62 concurrency
Mercer	Perry Township	131.2	211.1	PA 358 (Hadley Road) – Greenville, Sandy Lake	
Crawford	Greenwood Township	141.4	227.6	PA 285 to I-79	
Crawford	Meadville	147.2	236.9	US 6 west / US 322 west (Conneaut Lake Road) – Conneaut Lake PA 98 north – Fairview	Roundabout; southern terminus of US 6/US 322 concurrency, southern terminus of PA 98
Crawford	Meadville	148.4	238.8	I-79 – Pittsburgh, Erie	I-79 exit 147
Crawford	Meadville	149.0	239.8	PA 102 north (Pennsylvania Avenue)	Southern terminus of PA 102
Crawford	Meadville	150.1	241.6	US 322 east (Linden Street)	Northern terminus of US 322 concurrency
Crawford	Saegertown	156.5	251.9	PA 198 east (State Street) – Blooming Valley	Roundabout; southern terminus of PA 198 concurrency
Crawford	Saegertown	157.2	253.0	PA 198 west to I-79	Roundabout; northern terminus of PA 198 concurrency
Crawford	Cambridge Springs	165.2	265.9	PA 86 south (Main Street) / PA 408 east (Church Street)	Northern terminus of PA 86, western terminus of PA 408
Crawford	Cambridge Springs	165.4	266.2	PA 99 north (McClellan Street)	Southern terminus of PA 99
Erie	Mill Village	171.4	275.8	US 6 east / US 6N west – Corry, Edinboro	Eastern terminus of US 6N; Northern terminus of US 6 concurrency
Erie	Waterford	175.2	282.0	PA 97 south	Roundabout, southern terminus of PA 97 concurrency
Erie	Waterford	176.7	284.4	PA 97 north (Perry Highway)	Northern terminus of PA 97 concurrency
Erie	Summit Township	184.8	297.4	I-90 – Cleveland, Buffalo	I-90 exit 24
Erie	Millcreek Township	186.1	299.5	PA 99 south (Interchange Road) to I-79 – Edinboro	Northern terminus of PA 99, I-79 exit 180
Erie	Erie	189.5	305.0	US 20 (26th Street) – North East, Buffalo, Fairview, Cleveland US 19 ends	Northern terminus of US 19
1.000 mi = 1.609 km; 1.000 km = 0.621 mi: Concurrency terminus; HOV only; Incomplete access

== See also ==
U.S. Route 19
Previous state: West Virginia	Pennsylvania	Next state: Terminus
