= Nottingham Township, Pennsylvania =

Township in Pennsylvania, US

Coordinates: 40°12′50″N 80°03′26″W

Nottingham Township
- Township
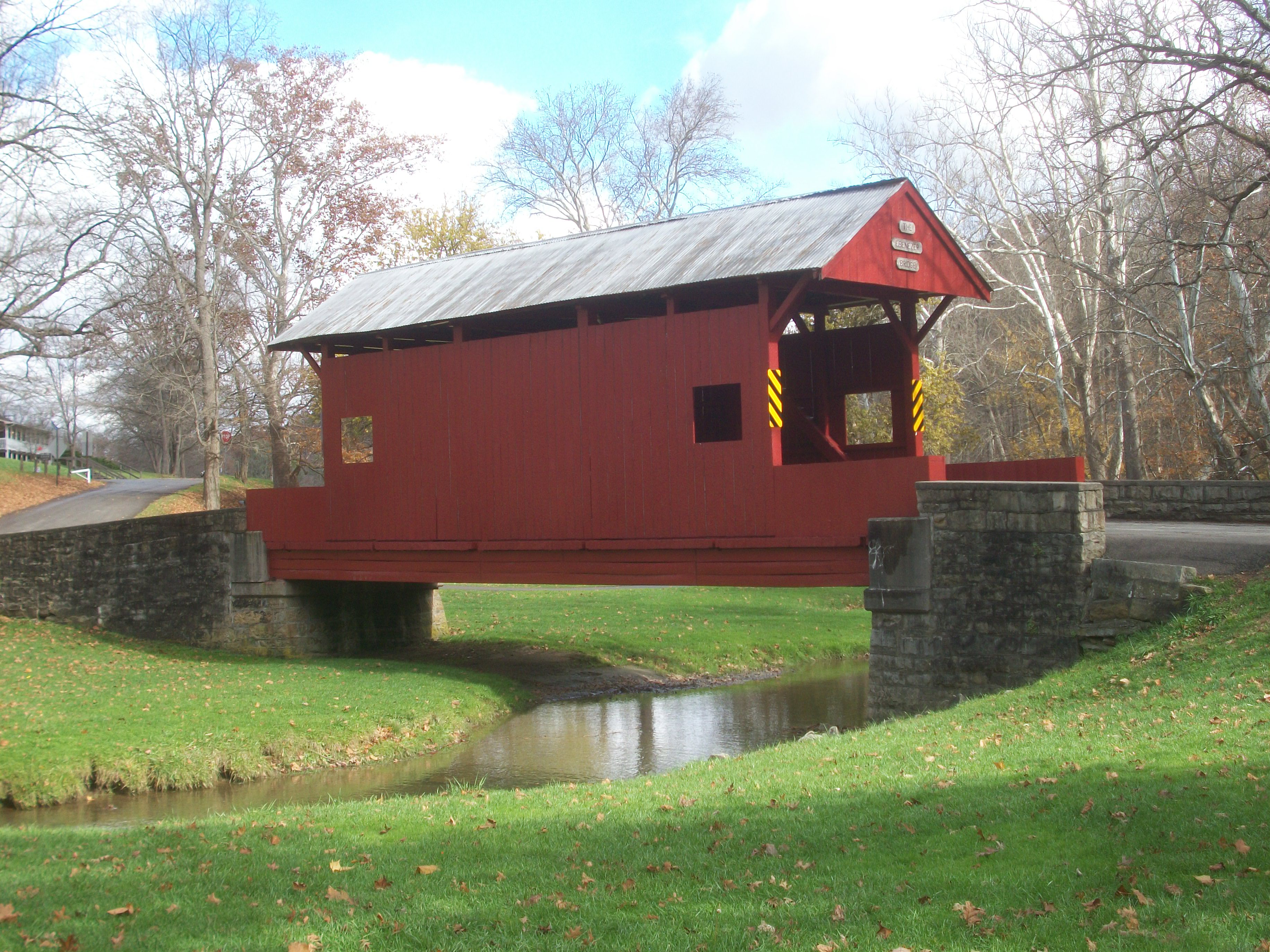
- Ebenezer Covered Bridge, Mingo Creek County Park

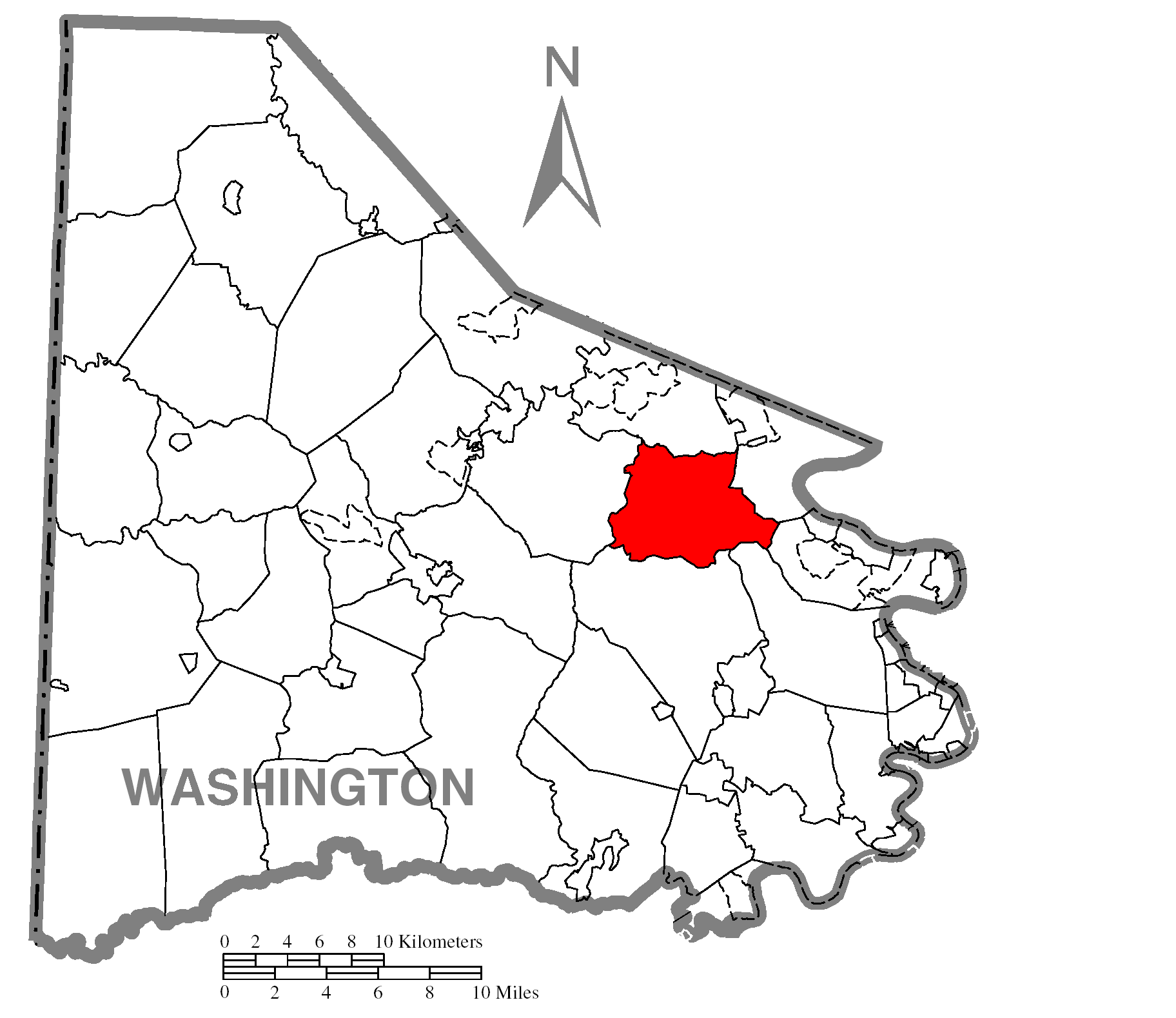
- Location of Nottingham Township in Washington County

- Location of Washington County in Pennsylvania
- Country: United States
- State: Pennsylvania
- County: Washington County

Area
  - Total: 20.29 sq mi (52.55 km^{2})
  - Land: 20.29 sq mi (52.55 km^{2})
  - Water: 0 sq mi (0.00 km^{2})

Population (2020)
  - Total: 2,933 ▼
  - Estimate (2021): 2,912
  - Density: 148.8/sq mi (57.47/km^{2})
- Time zone: UTC-4 (EST)
  - Summer (DST): UTC-5 (EDT)
- Area code: 724
- FIPS code: 42-125-55712

Historical population
Census	Pop.	Note	%±
2000	2,522		—
2010	3,036		20.4%
2020	2,933		−3.4%
2025 (est.)	3,065		4.5%
U.S. Decennial Census

Nottingham Township is a township in Washington County, Pennsylvania, United States. The population was 2,933 in the 2020 census.

== History ==
The Ebenezer Covered Bridge and Henry Covered Bridge are listed on the National Register of Historic Places.

== Geography ==
According to the United States Census Bureau, the township has a total area of 20.3 square miles (53 km^{2}), all of it land. It lies at an altitude of approximately 1,100 feet (340 meters) above sea level. It contains part of the census-designated place of Eighty Four.

== Surrounding neighborhoods ==
Nottingham Township has six borders, including the townships of Peters to the north, Union to the east, Carroll to the southeast, Fallowfield to the south-southeast, Somerset to the south, and North Strabane to the west.

== Demographics ==
As of the 2000 census, there were 2,522 people, 968 households, and 751 families living in the township. The population density was 124.4 people per square mile (48.0 people/km^{2}). There were 1,003 housing units at an average density of 49.5 per square mile (19.1/km^{2}). The racial makeup of the township was 99.09% White, 0.56% African American, 0.08% Asian, and 0.28% from two or more races. Hispanic or Latino of any race were 0.20% of the population.

Of the 968 households 29.2% had children under the age of 18 living with them, 69.1% were married couples living together, 6.3% had a female householder with no husband present, and 22.4% were non-families. 18.8% of households were one person and 6.8% were one person aged 65 or older. The average household size was 2.61 and the average family size was 2.99.

The age distribution was 23.4% under the age of 18, 4.9% from 18 to 24, 28.4% from 25 to 44, 30.3% from 45 to 64, and 13.1% 65 or older. The median age was 42 years. For every 100 females, there were 102.7 males. For every 100 females age 18 and over, there were 100.6 males.

The median household income was $57,109 and the median family income was $65,991. Males had a median income of $44,191 versus $25,446 for females. The per capita income for the township was $26,256. About 3.0% of families and 5.3% of the population were below the poverty line, including 8.0% of those under age 18 and 4.6% of those age 65 or over.
