= Pennsylvania Route 97 (Erie County) =

State highway in Erie County, Pennsylvania, US

Pennsylvania Route 97
- SR 197

Route information
- Maintained by PennDOT
- Length: 21.04 mi (33.86 km)

Major junctions
- South end: PA 8 in Union City
- US 19 in Waterford; I-90 near Erie
- North end: PA 8 in Erie

Location
- Country: United States
- State: Pennsylvania
- Counties: Erie

Highway system
- Pennsylvania State Route System; Interstate; US; State; Scenic; Legislative
← PA 96	→ PA 98
← PA 196	SR 197	→ PA 198

Pennsylvania Route 97 (PA 97) is one of two Pennsylvania state highways that carries the PA 97 designation; the other PA 97 is in Adams County. This northern PA 97, 21 miles (34 km) in length, is a north-south highway that terminates at PA 8 at both ends. The southern terminus is in Union City and the northern terminus is in Erie. The Pennsylvania Department of Transportation (PennDOT) internally designates this road SR 0197 to distinguish it from the other PA 97.

== Route description ==
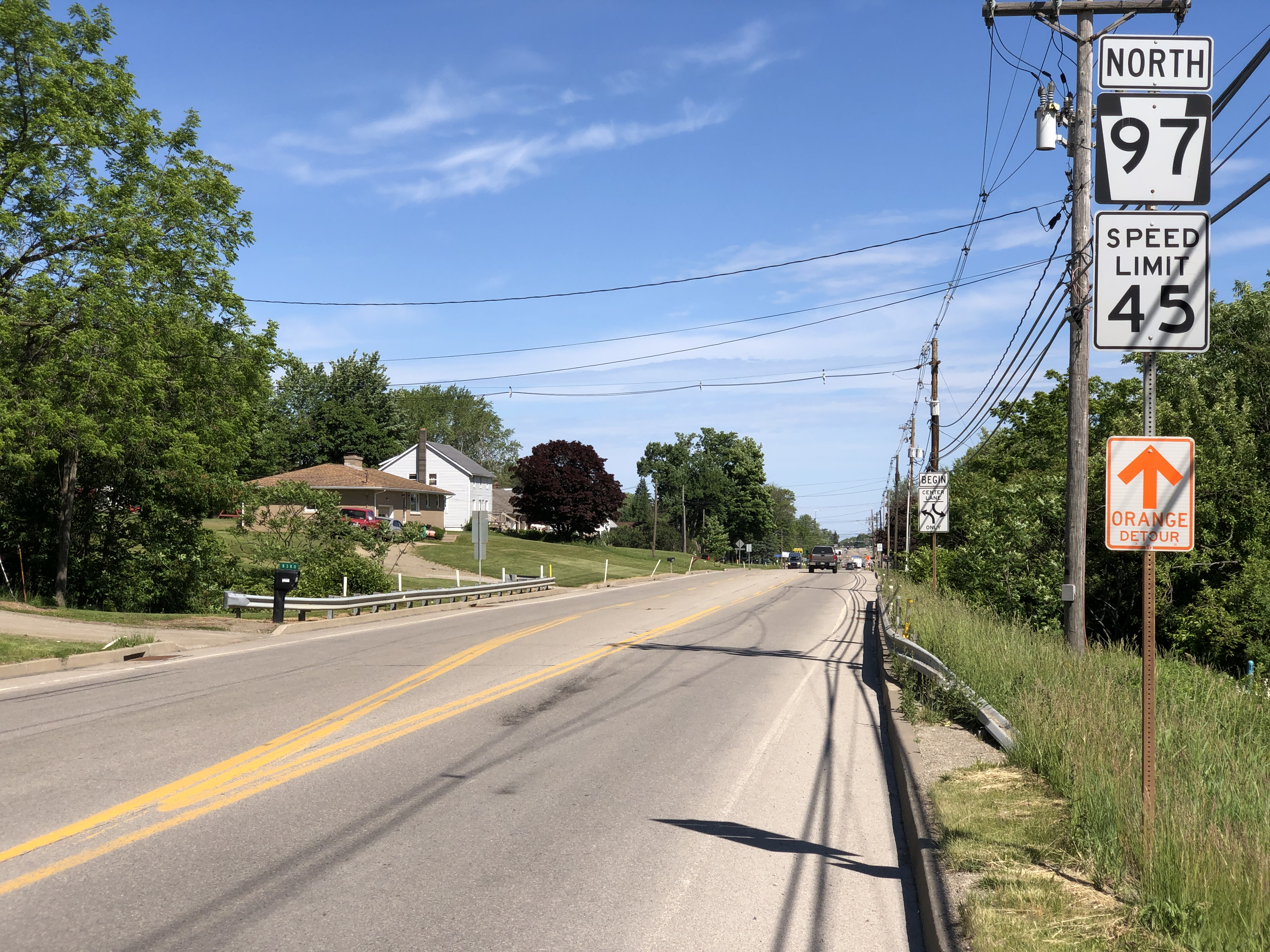
PA 97 northbound in Summit Township

PA 97 starts in the borough of Union City at the junction of PA 8 and PA 97. It travels west for about 7.5 miles (12.1 km) until it reaches the borough of Waterford. South of the borough, PA 97 merges with U.S. Route 19 (US 19), joining the Perry Highway and following the U.S. route northward for 1.5 miles (2.4 km) through Waterford. North of Waterford, PA 97 splits from US 19 but remains on the Perry Highway. Although both roads head north to the city of Erie, PA 97 takes a more easterly alignment as it travels northward.

After 8.7 miles (14.0 km), PA 97 meets Interstate 90 (I-90) at exit 27 immediately south of Erie. 0.9 miles (1.4 km) from the exit, PA 97 meets the southern terminus of PA 505. At PA 505, PA 97 separates from the Perry Highway and follows Old French Road north through downtown Erie to its terminus at an intersection with PA 8 two blocks south of US 20.

== History ==
The first designation of PA 97 existed in the 1930s, from US 6 in Waterford to US 19 in Kearsarge on what is now US 19. US 6 traveled along the current PA 97 designation from Waterford to Erie as the Lakes-to-Sea Highway.

By 1940, PA 97 was moved to its current alignment.

== Major intersections ==
The entire route is in Erie County.

Location	mi	km	Destinations	Notes
Union City	0.00	0.00	PA 8 (North Main Street)	Southern terminus
Waterford Township	7.57	12.18	US 19 south	Roundabout; southern terminus of US 19 overlap
Waterford	9.07	14.60	US 19 north (Peach Street)	Northern terminus of US 19 overlap
Summit Township	17.73	28.53	I-90 – Cleveland, Buffalo	Exit 27 (I-90)
Millcreek Township	18.63	29.98	PA 505 north (Perry Highway)	Southern terminus of PA 505
Erie	21.04	33.86	PA 8 (Parade Street)	Northern terminus
1.000 mi = 1.609 km; 1.000 km = 0.621 mi: Concurrency terminus
