= Samuel Brownlee House =

Historic house in Pennsylvania, United States

- U.S. National Register of Historic Places
- Washington County History & Landmarks Foundation Landmark
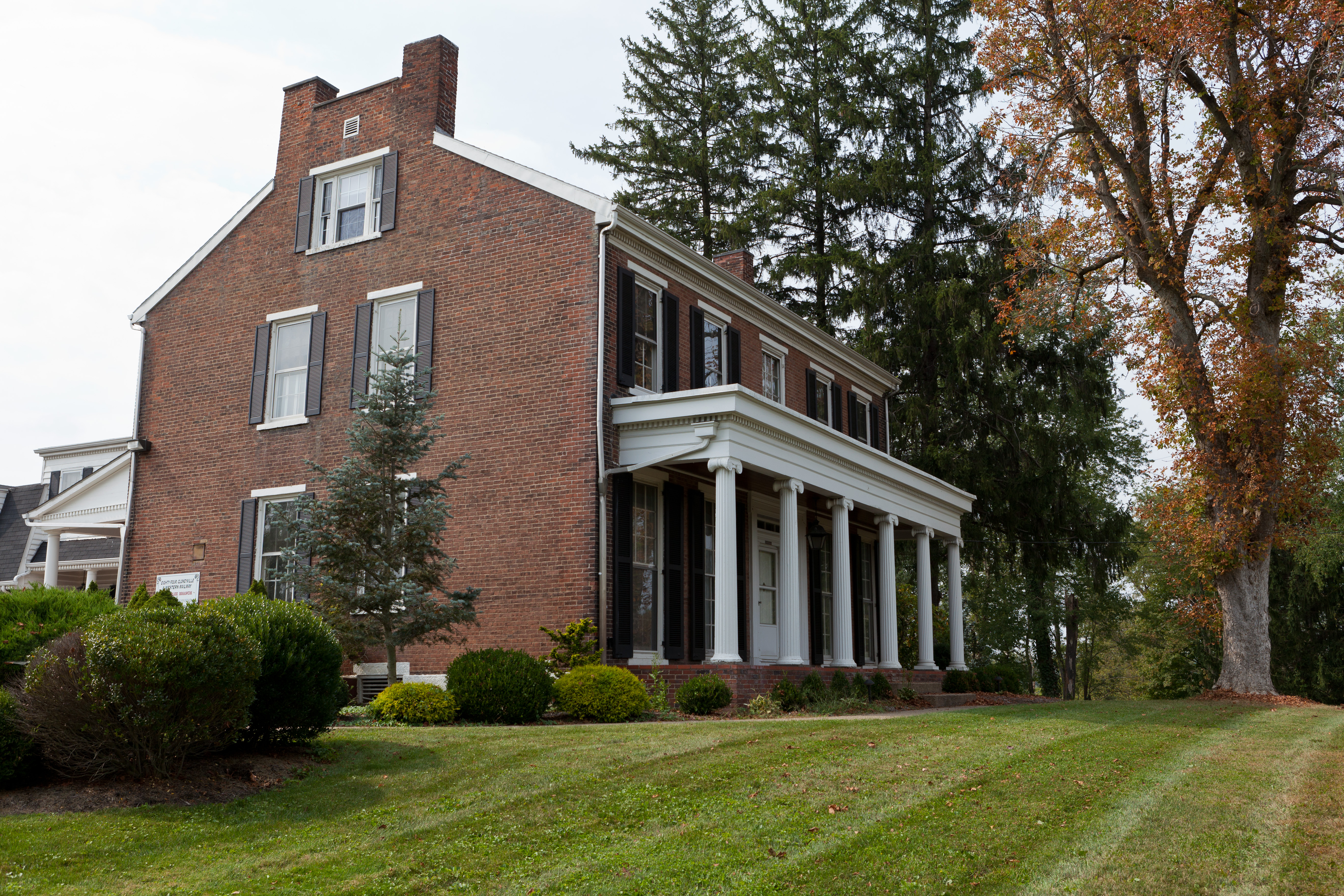

- Location within Pennsylvania Location within the United States
- Nearest city: Eighty-Four, Pennsylvania
- Coordinates: 40°12′24″N 80°7′41″W
- Area: 2 acres (0.81 ha)
- Built: 1846
- Architect: Samuel T. Brownlee
- Architectural style: Greek Revival, Georgian
- NRHP reference No.: 76001678
- Added to NRHP: November 07, 1976

Samuel Brownlee House is a historic building in Washington, Pennsylvania. It is designated as a historic residential landmark/farmstead by the Washington County History & Landmarks Foundation.
