= Huffman Distillery and Chopping Mill =

- U.S. National Register of Historic Places
- Washington County History & Landmarks Foundation Landmark
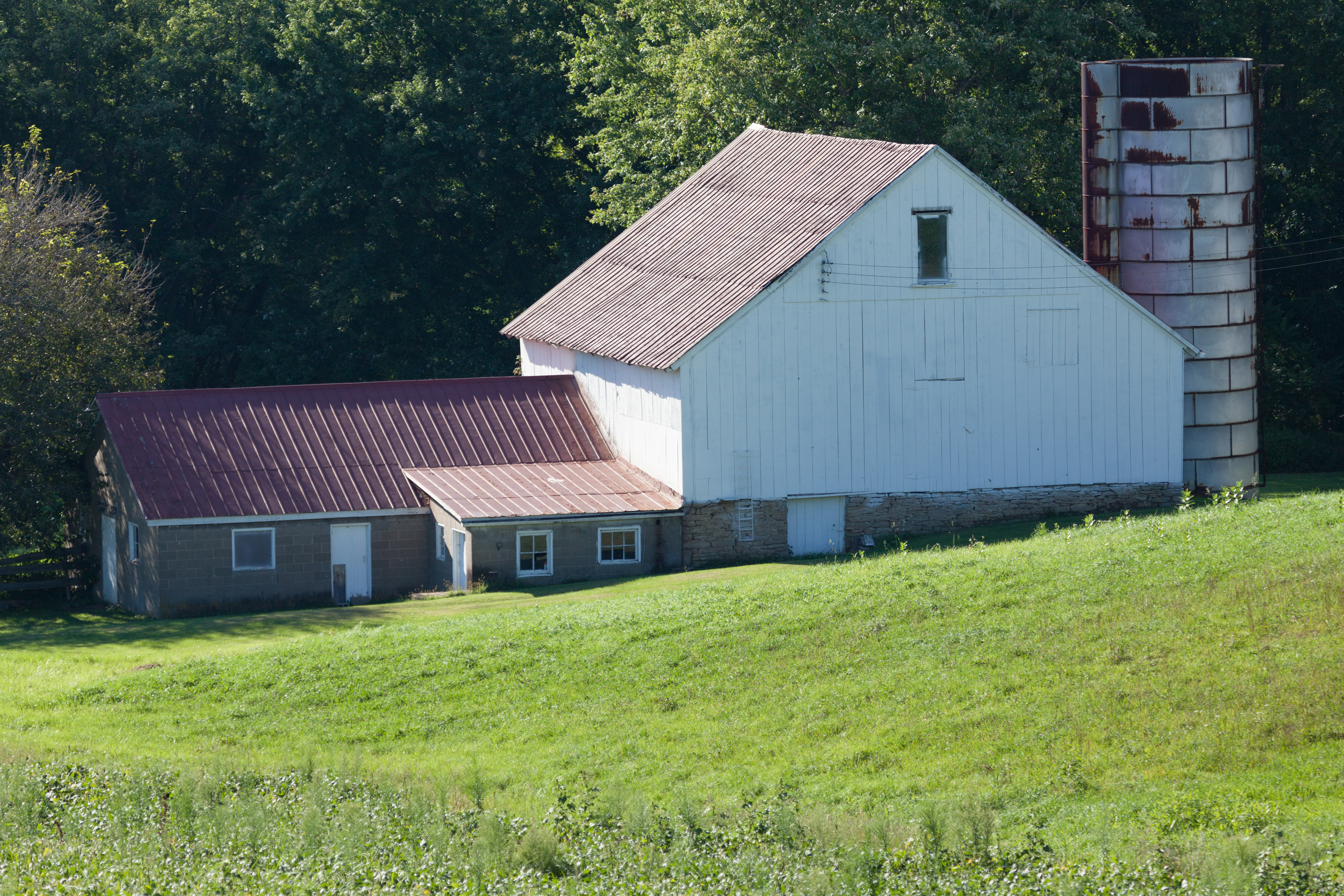
- The 1805 timber-frame chopping mill. The low buildings attached on the left are 20th-century additions and are not part of the historic mill.

- Location within Pennsylvania Location within the United States
- Nearest city: Cokeburg, Pennsylvania
- Coordinates: 40°7′21″N 80°3′59″W
- Area: 6.5 acres (2.6 ha)
- MPS: Whiskey Rebellion Resources in Southwestern Pennsylvania MPS
- NRHP reference No.: 92001499
- Added to NRHP: November 12, 1992

The Huffman Distillery and Chopping Mill is a historic complex of buildings in Somerset Township, Washington County, Pennsylvania, United States.

It was designated a historic residential landmark/farmstead by the Washington County History & Landmarks Foundation, and is listed on the National Register of Historic Places.

== History and architectural features ==
Contributing buildings include a 2 1/2-story, four-bay brick main house, which was built circa 1810, a timber-frame bank barn that was erected circa 1815, a stone-and-log distillery that was built sometime around 1790, and a timber-frame chopping mill that was built sometime around 1805. The mill was horse-powered, and was used to chop grain for the distilling process.

These buildings are a rare surviving example of an important industry in the Somerset Township area and the very small-scale industrial/commercial enterprises of the late eighteenth and early nineteenth centuries. The area had a high concentration of distillers, which were greatly affected by the whiskey excise tax and the Whiskey Rebellion.

The Huffman Distillery and Chopping Mill was designated a historic residential landmark/farmstead by the Washington County History & Landmarks Foundation, and is listed on the National Register of Historic Places.
