= Pennsylvania Route 121 =

State highway in Allegheny County, Pennsylvania, US

Pennsylvania Route 121

Route information
- Maintained by PennDOT
- Length: 4.00 mi (6.44 km)
- Existed: 1928–present

Major junctions
- South end: US 19 in Mt. Lebanon
- I-376 / US 22 / US 30 in Green Tree
- North end: PA 50 in Pittsburgh

Location
- Country: United States
- State: Pennsylvania
- Counties: Allegheny

Highway system
- Pennsylvania State Route System; Interstate; US; State; Scenic; Legislative
← PA 120	→ US 122

Pennsylvania Route 121 (PA 121) is a 4.00-mile-long (6.44 km) state highway located in Allegheny County in Pennsylvania. The southern terminus is at U.S. Route 19 (US 19) in Mt. Lebanon. The northern terminus is at PA 50 on the border of Green Tree and the Pittsburgh neighborhood of Westwood.

== Route description ==
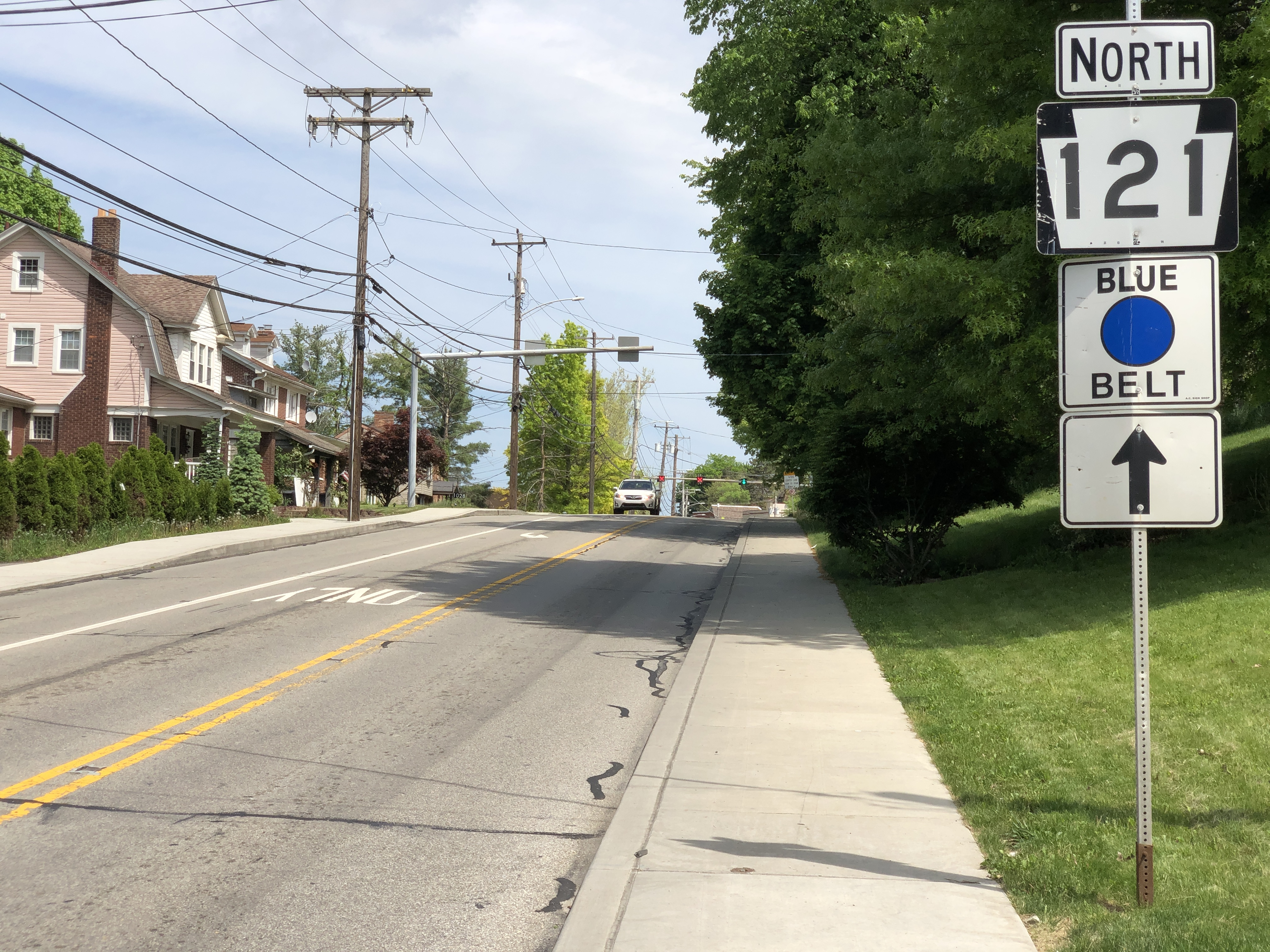
PA 121 northbound in Green Tree

PA 121 begins at an intersection with US 19 in the township of Mt. Lebanon, heading northwest on Cochran Road, a two-lane undivided road that heads through residential areas. From the southern terminus, the route is concurrent with the Yellow Belt of the Pittsburgh/Allegheny County Belt System. The road widens to four lanes as it enters commercial areas and becomes the border between Mt. Lebanon to the southwest and Scott Township to the northeast. PA 121 splits from the Yellow Belt and Cochran Road by turning north onto four-lane Greentree Road, fully entering Scott Township. The road passes through residential and commercial areas as it turns to the northeast, narrowing to two lanes as it enters the borough of Green Tree. In this area, the route passes more homes, with the Blue Belt joining the road at the Potomac Avenue intersection. PA 121 curves to the north, becoming a three lane road with a reversible lane. The road enters commercial areas, widening to four lanes as it reaches an interchange with I-376/US 22/US 30. Immediately after this interchange, PA 121 turns west onto Mansfield Avenue, a three lane road with one northbound lane and two southbound lanes. The route turns north onto two-lane Poplar Street and heads into wooded areas of homes. PA 121 heads northwest to reach its northern terminus at PA 50 on the border of Green Tree and the city of Pittsburgh in commercial areas.

== History ==
The original PA 121 ran from East Waynesburg to Point Marion in Greene County from 1928 to 1950. In 1961, PA 121 was reactivated and reassigned to its current route. From 1940 to 1946, the Greentree Road segment of the present-day PA 121 from Cochran Road to Mansfield Avenue was designated as PA 802.

== Major intersections ==
The entire route is in Allegheny County.

Location	mi	km	Destinations	Notes
Mt. Lebanon	0.00	0.00	US 19 / Yellow Belt (Beverly Road / Cochran Road)	Southern terminus of PA 121; southern end of concurrency with Yellow Belt
Mt. Lebanon	0.70	1.13	Yellow Belt (Greentree Road) to PA 50 – Heidelberg	Northern terminus of Yellow Belt concurrency
Scott Township	1.14	1.83	Forsythe Road to I-376 – Carnegie	
Green Tree	2.20	3.54	Blue Belt (Potomac Avenue)	Southern terminus of Blue Belt concurrency
Green Tree	3.18	5.12	I-376 (US 22 / US 30 / Penn-Lincoln Parkway) – Pittsburgh International Airport, Pittsburgh	Exit 67 (I-376); no access from PA 121 south to I-376 / US 22 / US 30
Green Tree	3.19	5.13	Greentree Road – West End	
Green Tree	3.39	5.46	Mansfield Avenue / Poplar Street to I-376 (Penn-Lincoln Parkway) – Pittsburgh International Airport, Pittsburgh	
Pittsburgh	4.00	6.44	PA 50 / Blue Belt (Noblestown Road)	Northern terminus of PA 121; northern terminus of concurrency with Blue Belt
1.000 mi = 1.609 km; 1.000 km = 0.621 mi: Concurrency terminus; Incomplete access
