= Cerl Wright Covered Bridge =

- U.S. National Register of Historic Places
- Washington County History & Landmarks Foundation Landmark
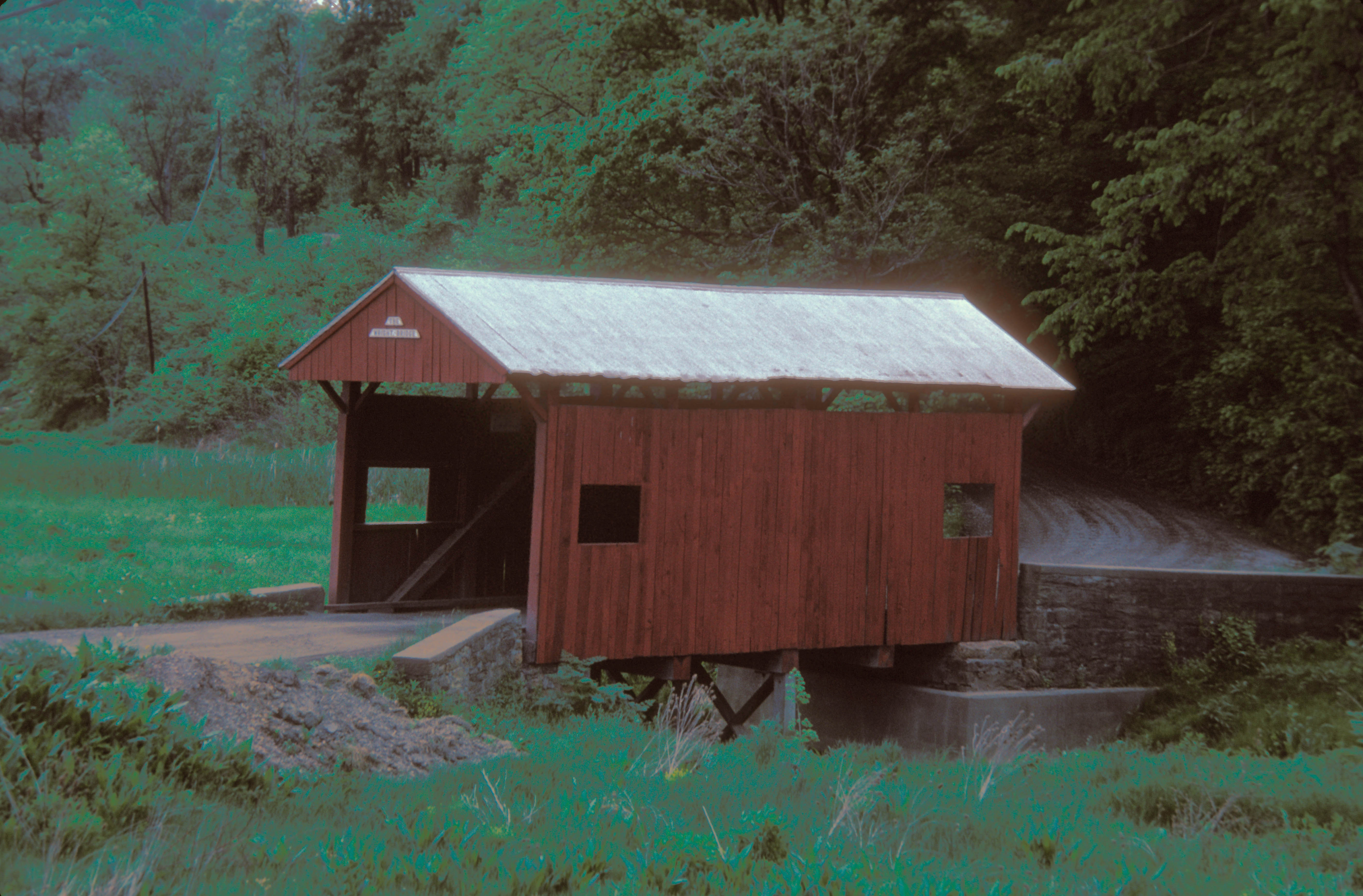

- Location within Pennsylvania Location within the United States
- Nearest city: Bentleyville, Pennsylvania
- Coordinates: 40°9′32″N 80°2′56″W
- Area: 0.1 acres (0.040 ha)
- Architectural style: Kingpost truss
- MPS: Covered Bridges of Washington and Greene Counties TR
- NRHP reference No.: 79003832
- Added to NRHP: June 22, 1979

The Cerl Wright Covered Bridge is a historic covered bridge in Eighty Four, Pennsylvania.

It is designated as a historic bridge by the Washington County History & Landmarks Foundation.
