= James Thome Farm =

Historic house in Pennsylvania, United States

- U.S. National Register of Historic Places
- Washington County History & Landmarks Foundation Landmark
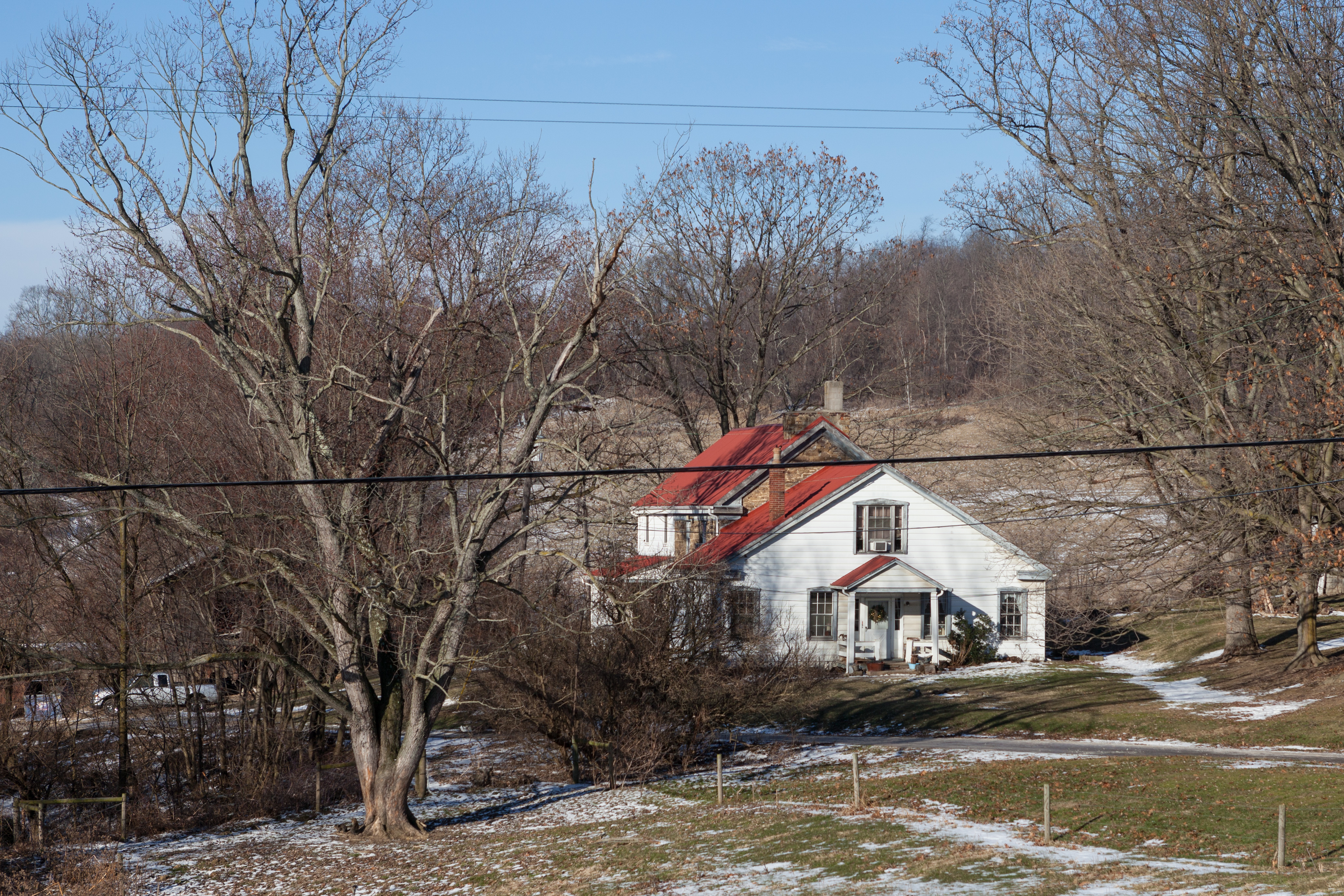
- The farmhouse, January 2015

- Location within Pennsylvania Location within the United States
- Nearest city: Eighty Four, Pennsylvania
- Coordinates: 40°11′53″N 80°9′30″W
- Area: 190 acres (77 ha)
- Built: 1800
- Architectural style: Georgian, Greek Revival
- NRHP reference No.: 97000292
- Added to NRHP: April 11, 1997

The James Thome Farm is a historic farm located in Eighty Four, Pennsylvania. It was designated as a historic residential landmark/farmstead by the Washington County History & Landmarks Foundation, and is listed on the National Register of Historic Places.

== History and architectural features ==
This historic structure consists of the Thome House, with the oldest section built circa 1810. Two outbuildings, six contributing structures, and two ponds are also located on this property. The farm's architectural evolution, of Georgian-inspired, Greek Revival, and a 1950s vernacular wing, is typical of other long-used farms in the Washington County area.

This property was designated as a historic residential landmark/farmstead by the Washington County History & Landmarks Foundation, and is listed on the National Register of Historic Places.
