= Wylandville, Pennsylvania =

Unincorporated community in Pennsylvania, US

Coordinates: 40°11′38″N 80°08′1″W

- census-designated place
- Interactive map of Wylandville, Pennsylvania
- Country: United States
- State: Pennsylvania
- County: Washington

Population (2010)
  - Total: 391
- Time zone: UTC-5 (Eastern (EST))
  - Summer (DST): UTC-4 (EDT)

Wylandville is a census-designated place located in North Strabane Township, Washington County in the state of Pennsylvania, United States. The community is located in northern Washington County along Pennsylvania Route 519. As of the 2010 census the population was 391 residents.

== Education ==
It is in the Canon-McMillan School District.
