= Pennsylvania Route 50 =

State highway in Pennsylvania, US

Pennsylvania Route 50

Route information
- Maintained by PennDOT
- Length: 32.712 mi (52.645 km)
- Existed: 1961–present

Major junctions
- West end: PA 844 in Independence Township
- PA 18 near Hickory; I-79 in Bridgeville; I-376 in Carnegie
- East end: PA 60 in Crafton Heights

Location
- Country: United States
- State: Pennsylvania
- Counties: Washington, Allegheny

Highway system
- Pennsylvania State Route System; Interstate; US; State; Scenic; Legislative
← PA 49	→ PA 51

Pennsylvania Route 50 (PA 50) is a 32.7-mile-long (52.6 km) state highway located in western Pennsylvania. The western terminus of the route is at PA 844 in the Independence Township community of Independence less than a mile from the West Virginia state line. The eastern terminus is at PA 60 in Crafton Heights. PA 50 was designated in 1961, replacing the portion of PA 28 between West Virginia and Pittsburgh.

== Route description ==
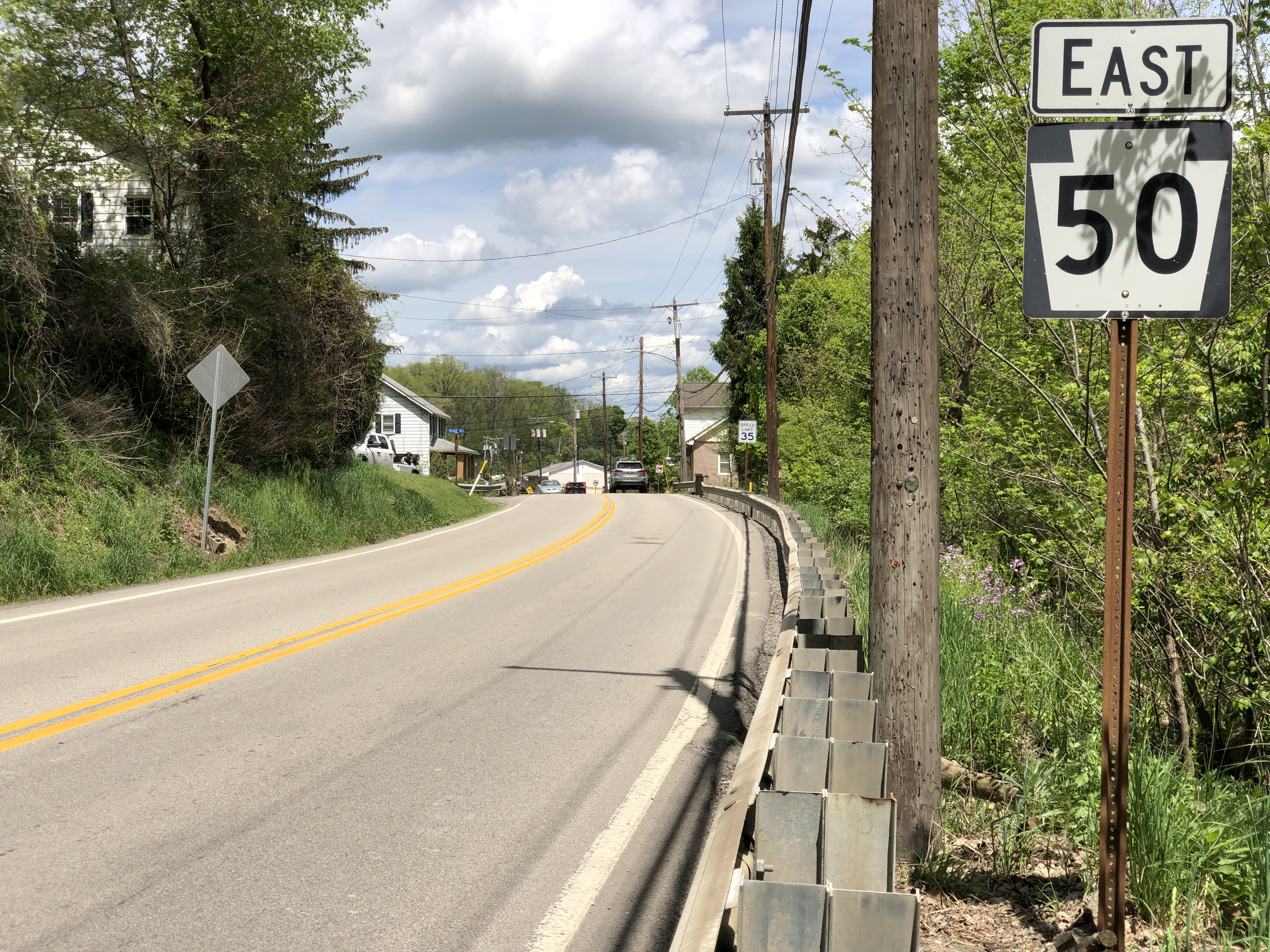
PA 50 eastbound in Cecil Township

=== Washington County ===
PA 50 begins at an intersection with PA 844 in the community of Independence in Independence Township, Washington County, heading northeast on two-lane undivided Avella Road. The road winds north through a mix of farmland and woodland with some homes, curving east. The route winds through more rural areas, passing through P&W Patch and heading into woods as it comes to an intersection with the northern terminus of PA 231. PA 50 turns northeast and heads into the residential community of Avella, curving north before turning east and passing over a Wheeling and Lake Erie Railway line. The route turns south-southeast before quickly turning east and then south-southeast again, running through more of the community. The road leaves Avella and turns east into woodland a short distance to the north of the railroad tracks, crossing the Cross Creek into Cross Creek Township. PA 50 runs through more forested areas to the north of the creek and the railroad tracks, with the road and railroad line turning northeast away from the Cross Creek. The route runs east through more woodland with some fields and homes, passing through Rea and crossing the Wheeling and Lake Erie Railway. The road continues east-northeast through more rural areas to the south of the railroad tracks, passing through Woodrow. PA 50 heads into Mount Pleasant Township and turns northeast, passing under the Wheeling and Lake Erie Railway. The route runs through more agricultural and wooded areas with some residences, coming to an intersection with PA 18. Here, PA 18 turns northeast to form a brief concurrency with PA 50 on Main Street, soon turning to the northwest.

PA 50 continues east and passes over a tunnel of the Wheeling and Lake Erie Railway, heading past homes and some businesses as it heads east-northeast through Hickory. The road turns northeast and intersects the northern terminus of PA 519. The route heads into open agricultural areas with some trees and homes, becoming Millers Run Road. PA 50 winds east through more rural areas with some residential development and crosses into Cecil Township, passing through Gilmore. The road runs through wooded areas with some development, coming to a junction with PA 980 in Venice. PA 980 briefly follows PA 50 before heading north, with PA 50 crossing Millers Run and heading through more woodland and commercial development parallel to Millers Run to the south. The route heads into a mix of homes and businesses, turning northeast and heading through Bishop and Cecil. The road continues through more developed areas and widens into a four-lane divided highway, crossing Millers Run.

=== Allegheny County ===
PA 50 enters South Fayette Township in Allegheny County and becomes an unnamed road, heading through wooded areas with some nearby residential and commercial development. The road passes under the PA 576 toll road, with access provided by South Fayette Way, before it heads across Millers Run twice. Near Gladden, the road intersects the eastern terminus of PA 978. The route winds northeast near more suburban areas separated by woodland, with the Wheeling and Lake Erie Railway a short distance to the northwest of the road. PA 50 becomes Millers Run Road again and heads east to an interchange with I-79 in a commercial area. Past this interchange, the route turns north-northeast onto four-lane undivided Washington Avenue and crosses the Chartiers Creek into the borough of Bridgeville. The road becomes two lanes and runs through the commercial downtown of Bridgeville, becoming a part of the Orange Belt of the Allegheny County belt system at the Station Street intersection, before passing under the Wheeling and Lake Erie Railway. PA 50 passes more homes and businesses, with the Orange Belt turning west at Prestley Road, prior to crossing the Chartiers Creek into Collier Township and heading northeast past several commercial establishments on four-lane divided Washington Pike. The route becomes a four-lane undivided road and runs past more businesses with some homes, passing through Kirwan Heights and coming to a ramp that provides access to I-79 to the west. The road continues north-northeast through areas of residential and commercial development between I-79 to the west and the Chartiers Creek to the east, entering Scott Township and passing more businesses as a divided highway. PA 50 curves northeast and heads into the borough of Heidelberg as an undivided road and curves north through residential areas with a few commercial buildings.

The route becomes divided again crosses the Chartiers Creek back into Scott Township, becoming Washington Avenue and turning northeast as it passes over the Pittsburgh and Ohio Central Railroad at the Carothers Avenue/Hope Hollow Road intersection. Here, the Yellow Belt joins the road and it becomes undivided as it passes more homes and businesses, turning north and coming into the borough of Carnegie. PA 50 narrows to two lanes and runs through residential areas, reaching an intersection with East Main Street in the commercial downtown. At this point, the Yellow Belt turns southwest onto that road while PA 50 heads northeast onto East Main Street, passing downtown businesses before running past a mix of residential and commercial development. The route comes to an interchange with I-376/US 22/US 30 with access through local streets as it crosses back into Scott Township and heads east through more suburban development on Noblestown Road. The road turns northeast and becomes the border between the city of Pittsburgh to the northwest and the borough of Green Tree to the southeast as it passes through wooded areas with some nearby homes. PA 50 curves east and north as it passes southeast of Chartiers Cemetery and runs near more residences and businesses. The route curves northeast and east through more wooded residential areas, becoming a part of the Blue Belt at the Baldwick Road intersection. The road gains a center left-turn lane and heads north-northeast past businesses, intersecting the northern terminus of PA 121 where the Blue Belt heads southeast to follow that route. Here, the route turns north to fully enter Pittsburgh and pass more commercial establishments as a three-lane road with two southbound lanes and one northbound lane. PA 50 becomes two lanes and turns northeast into residential neighborhoods, curving northwest before reaching its eastern terminus at PA 60.

== History ==
On July 15, 1960, PA 50 was designated to replace the stretch of PA 28 between the West Virginia border and Pittsburgh. This designation change was made to reduce the number of concurrent routes in Pittsburgh. The changes took effect a few months later and signs were changed by spring 1961. Although PA 28 was (and remains) signed as a north-south route, PA 50 was signed east-west as the truncated route now ran mostly east-west as opposed to overall northeast-southwest route of the original PA 28.

== Major intersections ==
County	Location	mi	km	Destinations	Notes
Washington	Independence Township	0.000	0.000	PA 844 (Washington Pike) – West Middletown, Wellsburg	Western terminus of PA 50
Washington	Independence Township	2.929	4.714	PA 231 south (Scenic Drive)	Northern terminus of PA 231
Washington	Mount Pleasant Township	11.534	18.562	PA 18 south (Henderson Avenue) – Washington	Western terminus of PA 18 concurrency
Washington	Mount Pleasant Township	12.008	19.325	PA 18 north (Burgettstown Road) – Burgettstown	Eastern terminus of PA 18 concurrency
Washington	Mount Pleasant Township	13.420	21.597	PA 519 south (Westland Road) – Westland, Houston	Northern terminus of PA 519
Washington	Cecil Township	17.552	28.247	PA 980 – McDonald, Canonsburg	
Allegheny	South Fayette Township	21.062	33.896	To PA Turnpike 576 – Pittsburgh International Airport, Washington	Access via South Fayette Way
Allegheny	South Fayette Township	21.562	34.701	PA 978 north (Millers Run Road) / Parks Road – Gladden	Southern terminus of PA 978
Allegheny	Bridgeville	24.825– 25.039	39.952– 40.296	I-79 (Raymond P. Shafer Highway) – Pittsburgh, Washington	Exit 54 (I-79)
Allegheny	Bridgeville	25.121	40.428	Washington Pike - Hendersonville	
Allegheny	Bridgeville	25.525	41.079	Orange Belt (Bower Hill Road) / Murray Avenue – Upper Saint Clair	Southern terminus of Orange Belt concurrency
Allegheny	Bridgeville	25.711	41.378	Orange Belt (Prestley Road)	Northern terminus of Orange Belt concurrency
Allegheny	Collier Township	26.688– 26.724	42.950– 43.008	I-79 (Raymond P. Shafer Highway) – Washington, Erie	Exit 55 (I-79)
Allegheny	Scott Township	28.412	45.725	Yellow Belt (Hope Hollow Road / Carothers Avenue)	Southern terminus of Yellow Belt concurrency
Allegheny	Carnegie	29.324– 29.368	47.192– 47.263	Academy Street to I-376 / US 22 / US 30 – Pittsburgh International Airport, Pittsburgh	To exit 65 (I-376) via Academy Street / Lydia Street
Allegheny	Carnegie	29.452	47.398	Yellow Belt (East Main Street)	Northern terminus of Yellow Belt concurrency
Allegheny	Pittsburgh	31.676	50.978	Blue Belt (Baldwick Road) / School Street	Southern terminus of Blue Belt concurrency
Allegheny	Pittsburgh	31.929	51.385	PA 121 south / Blue Belt (Poplar Street)	Northern terminus of PA 121, northern terminus of Blue Belt concurrency
Allegheny	Pittsburgh	32.712	52.645	PA 60 (Crafton Boulevard / Noblestown Road)	Eastern terminus of PA 50
1.000 mi = 1.609 km; 1.000 km = 0.621 mi: Concurrency terminus; Unopened
