= Cecil-Bishop, Pennsylvania =

Unincorporated community in Pennsylvania, US

- Census-designated place
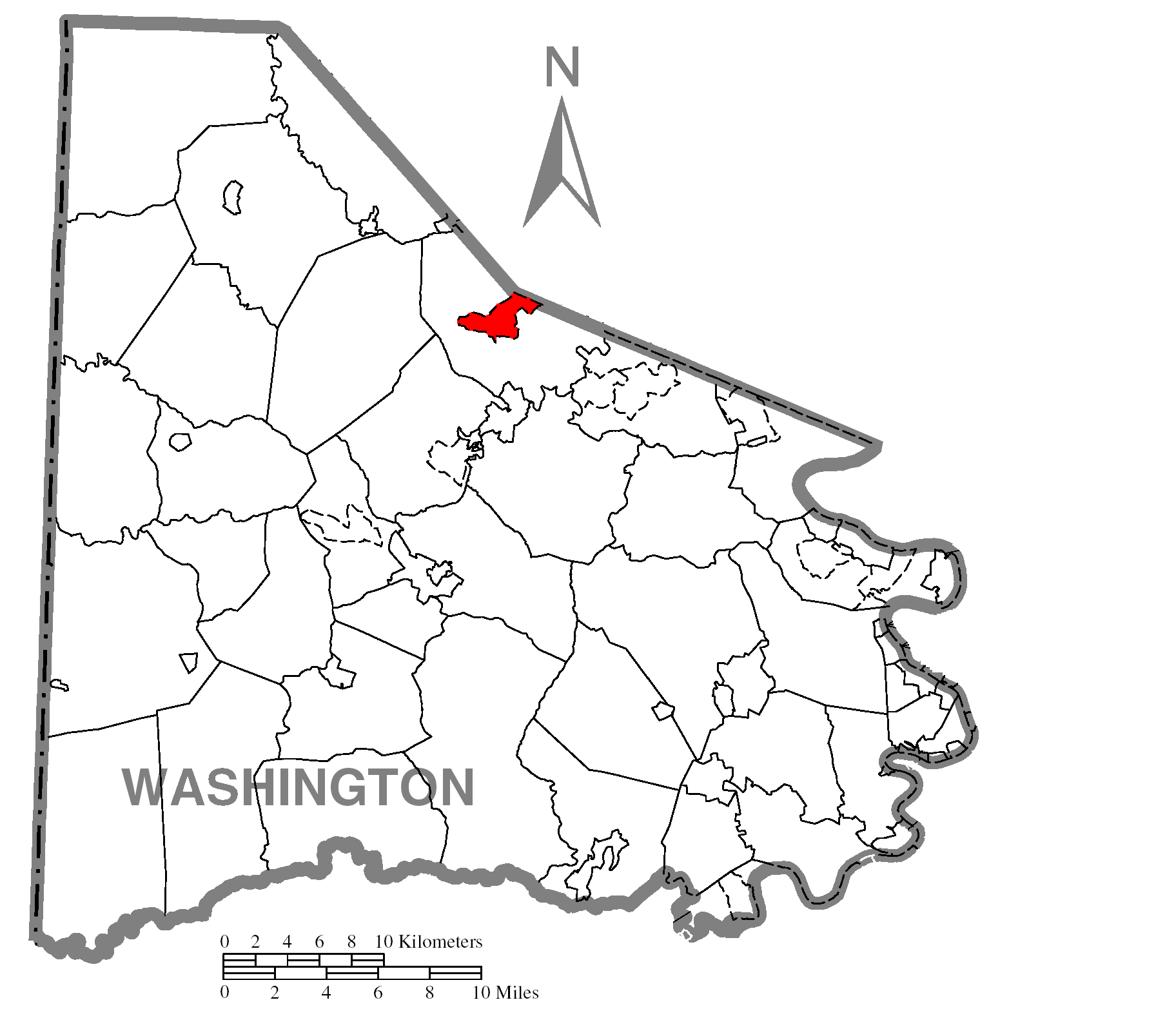
- Location of Cecil-Bishop in Washington County, Pennsylvania

- Location within Pennsylvania Location within the United States
- Coordinates: 40°19′46″N 80°10′15″W
- Country: United States
- State: Pennsylvania
- County: Washington

Area
  - Total: 2.77 sq mi (7.18 km^{2})
  - Land: 2.77 sq mi (7.18 km^{2})
  - Water: 0 sq mi (0.00 km^{2})
- Elevation: 1,138 ft (347 m)

Population (2020)
  - Total: 2,730
  - Density: 984.8/sq mi (380.24/km^{2})
- Time zone: UTC-5 (Eastern (EST))
  - Summer (DST): UTC-4 (EDT)
- ZIP Code: 15321, 15350, 15361
- Area code: 724
- GNIS feature ID: 2389290

Cecil-Bishop is a census-designated place in Washington County, Pennsylvania, United States. The population was 2,730 at the 2020 census. The census-designated place encompasses the unincorporated communities of Cecil and Bishop along Pennsylvania Route 50.

Cecil-Bishop is located in the geographic center of Cecil Township. Much of the farmland in the area has been developed into planned neighborhoods since the 1990s due to the development of the Southpointe business park as well as Cecil Township's growth as a suburb of Pittsburgh.

== Geography ==
Cecil-Bishop is located at 40°19′20″N 80°11′29″W (40.322303, -80.191384).

According to the United States Census Bureau, the CDP has a total area of 2.5 square miles (6.5 km^{2}), all of it land.

== Demographics ==
Historical population
| Census | Pop. | Note | %± |
|---|---|---|---|
| 2000 | 2,585 | | — |
| 2010 | 2,476 | | −4.2% |
| 2020 | 2,730 | | 10.3% |
U.S. Decennial Census

At the 2000 census there were 2,585 people, 958 households, and 750 families living in the CDP. The population density was 1,016.8 inhabitants per square mile (392.6/km^{2}). There were 992 housing units at an average density of 390.2 per square mile (150.7/km^{2}). The racial makeup of the CDP was 98.84% White, 0.31% African American, 0.04% Native American, 0.23% Asian, 0.12% from other races, and 0.46% from two or more races. Hispanic or Latino of any race were 0.74%.

Of the 958 households 36.2% had children under the age of 18 living with them, 66.9% were married couples living together, 8.7% had a female householder with no husband present, and 21.7% were non-families. 18.1% of households were one person and 7.5% were one person aged 65 or older. The average household size was 2.70 and the average family size was 3.10.

The age distribution was 25.7% under the age of 18, 7.0% from 18 to 24, 29.6% from 25 to 44, 26.7% from 45 to 64, and 11.0% 65 or older. The median age was 38 years. For every 100 females, there were 99.5 males. For every 100 females age 18 and over, there were 95.3 males.

The median household income was $50,607 and the median family income was $55,900. Males had a median income of $45,865 versus $26,685 for females. The per capita income for the CDP was $19,639. About 6.8% of families and 7.5% of the population were below the poverty line, including 10.2% of those under age 18 and 8.6% of those age 65 or over.

== Education ==
It is in the Canon-McMillan School District.
