= North Strabane Township, Pennsylvania =

Township in Pennsylvania, US

Coordinates: 40°15′03″N 80°06′59″W

North Strabane Township, Washington County, Pennsylvania
- Township
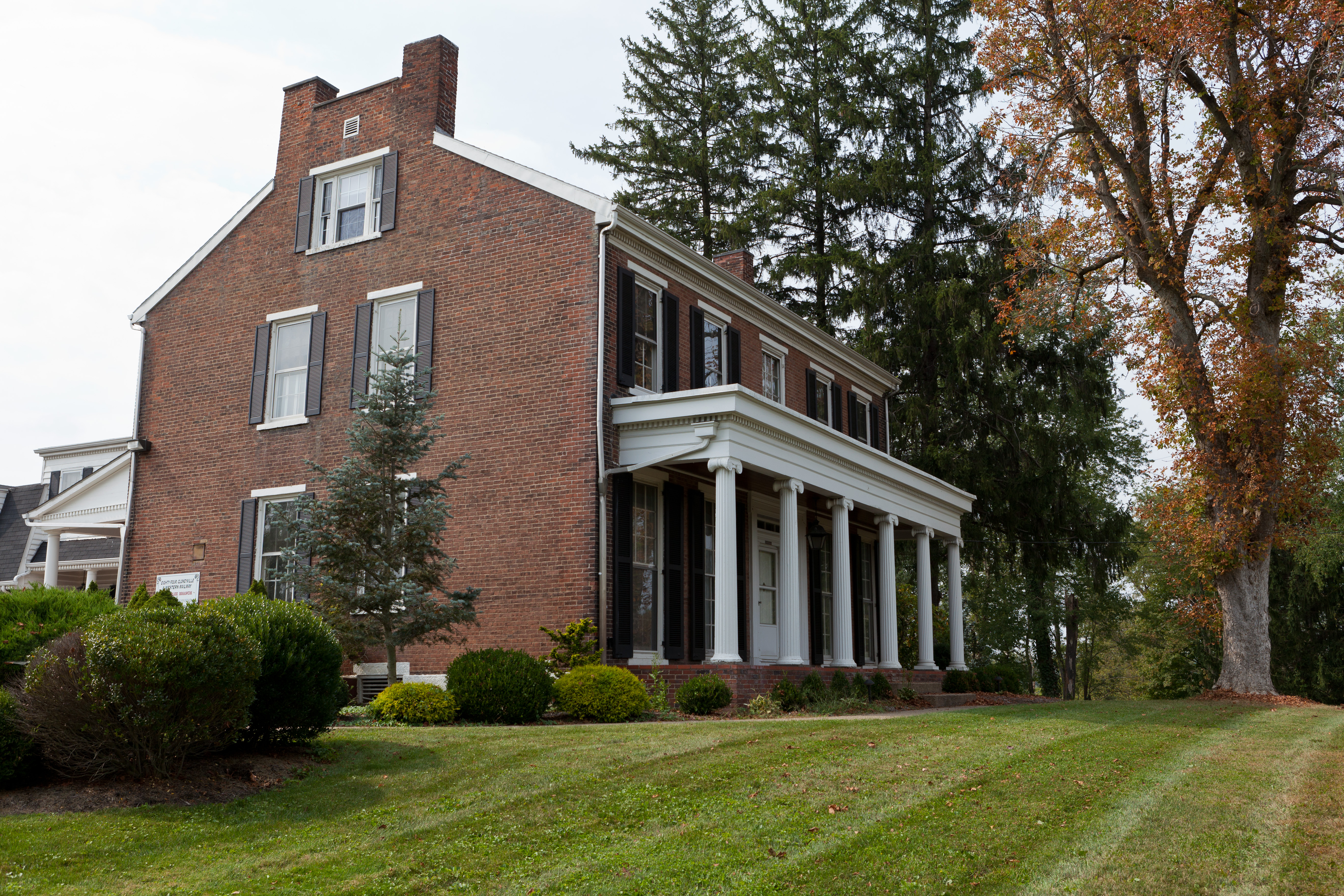
- The Samuel Brownlee House, a historic site in the township

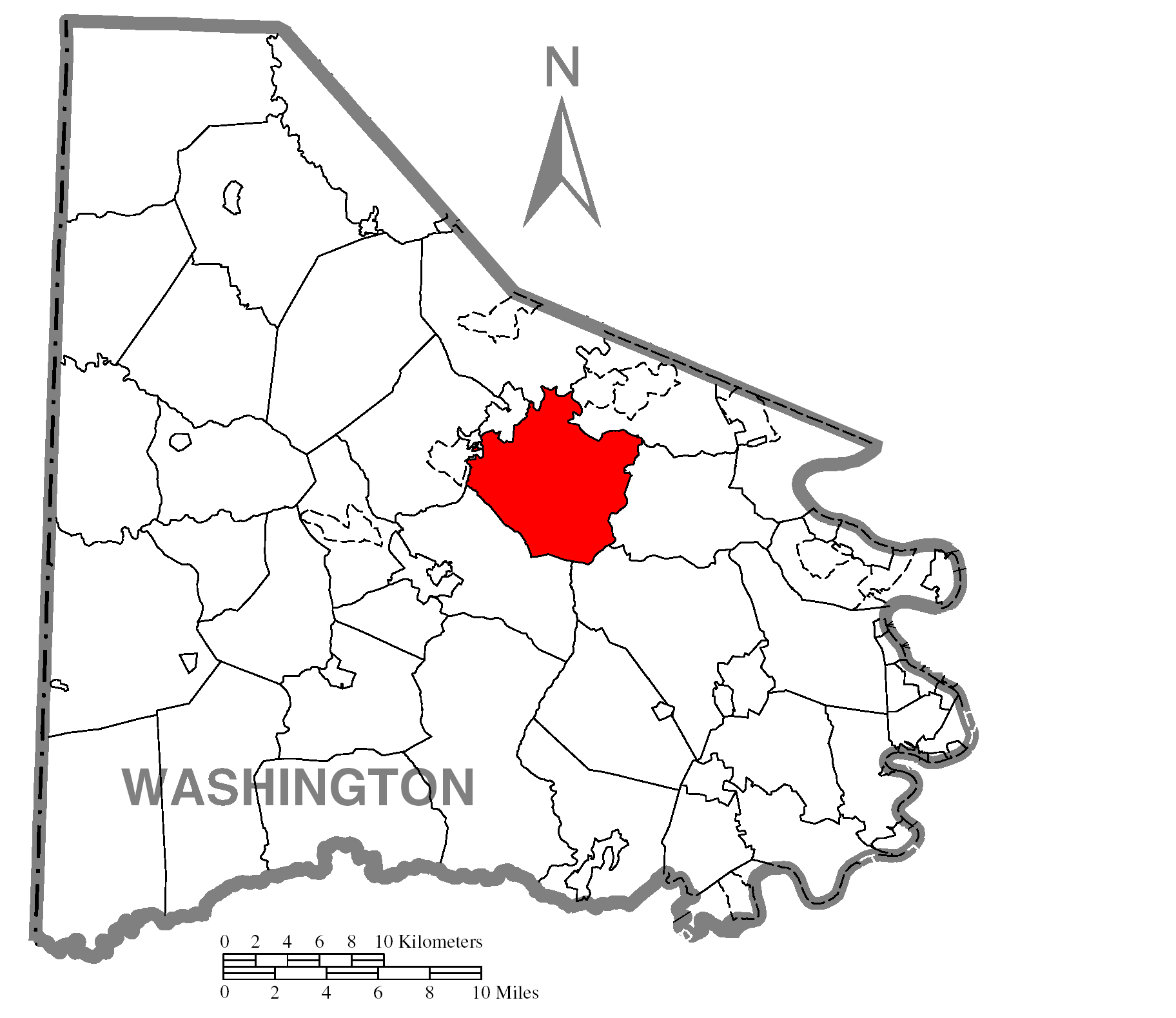
- Map of Washington County, Pennsylvania highlighting North Strabane Township

- Map of Washington County, Pennsylvania
- Country: United States
- State: Pennsylvania
- County: Washington
- Established: March 28, 1781

Government
  - Type: Council
  - Chairman: Neil Kelly

Area
  - Total: 27.40 sq mi (70.96 km^{2})
  - Land: 27.26 sq mi (70.61 km^{2})
  - Water: 0.14 sq mi (0.35 km^{2})

Population (2020)
  - Total: 15,691 ▲
  - Estimate (2021): 15,910
  - Density: 534.8/sq mi (206.48/km^{2})
- Time zone: UTC-5 (Eastern (EST))
  - Summer (DST): UTC-4 (EDT)
- Area code: 724
- FIPS code: 42-125-55432
- Website: Township website

Historical population
Census	Pop.	Note	%±
2000	10,057		—
2010	13,408		33.3%
2020	15,691		17.0%
2025 (est.)	17,433		11.1%
U.S. Decennial Census

North Strabane Township is a township in Washington County, Pennsylvania, United States, and a suburb within the Pittsburgh metropolitan area. The population was 15,691 at the 2020 census. The township is named after the town of Strabane in County Tyrone, Northern Ireland. The township borders the borough of Canonsburg, Pennsylvania to the north. North Strabane is a part of Canon-McMillan School District.

== History ==
The Samuel Brownlee House and James Thome Farm are listed on the National Register of Historic Places.

== Geography ==
According to the United States Census Bureau, the township has a total area of 27.4 square miles (71 km^{2}), of which, 27.3 square miles (71 km^{2}) of it is land and 0.1 square miles (0.26 km^{2}) of it (0.47%) is water. It contains the census-designated place of Wylandville and part of Eighty Four.

== Surrounding neighborhoods ==
North Strabane Township has eight borders, including Cecil Township to the north, Peters Township to the northeast, Nottingham Township to the east, Somerset Township to the southeast, South Strabane Township to the south and southwest, Chartiers Township and Houston to the west, and Canonsburg to the northwest.

== Demographics ==
As of the census of 2000, there were 10,057 people, 3,975 households, and 2,897 families living in the township. The population density was 368.4 inhabitants per square mile (142.2/km^{2}). There were 4,156 housing units at an average density of 152.2 units per square mile (58.8 units/km^{2}). The racial makeup of the township was 96.45% White, 2.08% African American, 0.01% Native American, 0.81% Asian, 0.02% Pacific Islander, 0.22% from other races, and 0.42% from two or more races. Hispanic or Latino of any race were 0.61% of the population.

There were 3,975 households, out of which 29.4% had children under the age of 18 living with them, 62.4% were married couples living together, 7.6% had a female householder with no husband present, and 27.1% were non-families. 24.0% of all households were made up of individuals, and 9.2% had someone living alone who was 65 years of age or older. The average household size was 2.45 and the average family size was 2.92.

In the township the population was spread out, with 22.2% under the age of 18, 4.7% from 18 to 24, 31.1% from 25 to 44, 25.8% from 45 to 64, and 16.2% who were 65 years of age or older. The median age was 40 years. For every 100 females there were 94.8 males. For every 100 females age 18 and over, there were 91.6 males.

The median income for a household in the township was $50,754, and the median income for a family was $60,141. Males had a median income of $41,879 versus $28,291 for females. The per capita income for the township was $23,457. About 3.4% of families and 4.0% of the population were below the poverty line, including 5.7% of those under age 18 and 4.1% of those age 65 or over.
