= Westland, Pennsylvania =

Unincorporated community in Pennsylvania, US

Coordinates: 40°16′37″N 80°16′23″W

- census-designated place
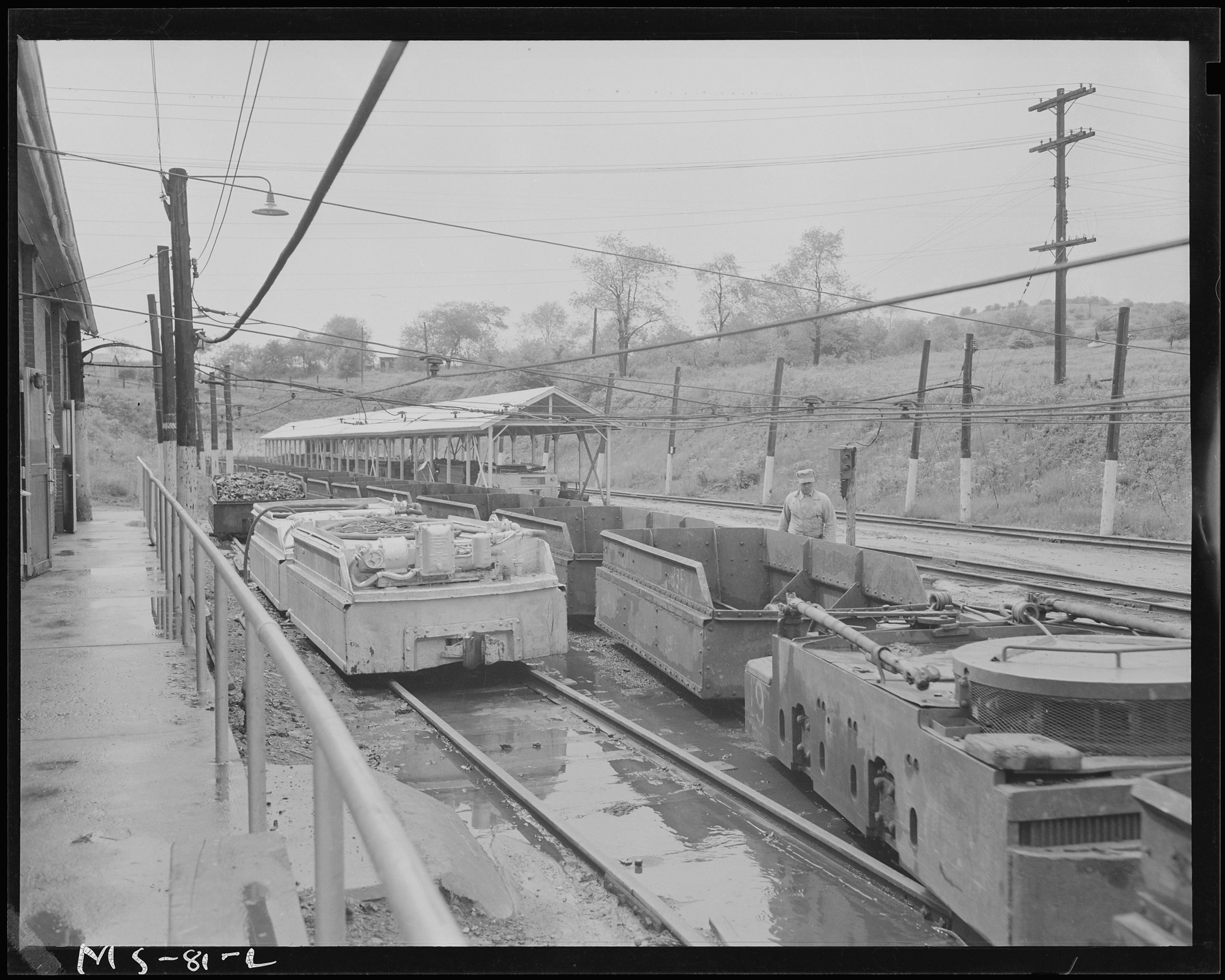
- Empty coal shuttle at Pittsburgh Coal Company, Westland Mine, 1946
- Interactive map of Westland, Pennsylvania
- Country: United States
- State: Pennsylvania
- County: Washington

Population (2010)
  - Total: 167
- Time zone: UTC-5 (Eastern (EST))
  - Summer (DST): UTC-4 (EDT)

Westland is a census-designated place that is located in Mount Pleasant and Chartiers Townships in Washington County in the Commonwealth of Pennsylvania in the United States.

== Geography ==
The community is located in northern Washington County on Pennsylvania Route 519, approximately five miles northwest of the community of McGovern.

== Demographics ==
As of the 2010 census, the population was 167 residents.

== Education ==
It is in the Fort Cherry School District.
