= Somerset Township, Washington County, Pennsylvania =

Township in Pennsylvania, US

Somerset Township
- Township
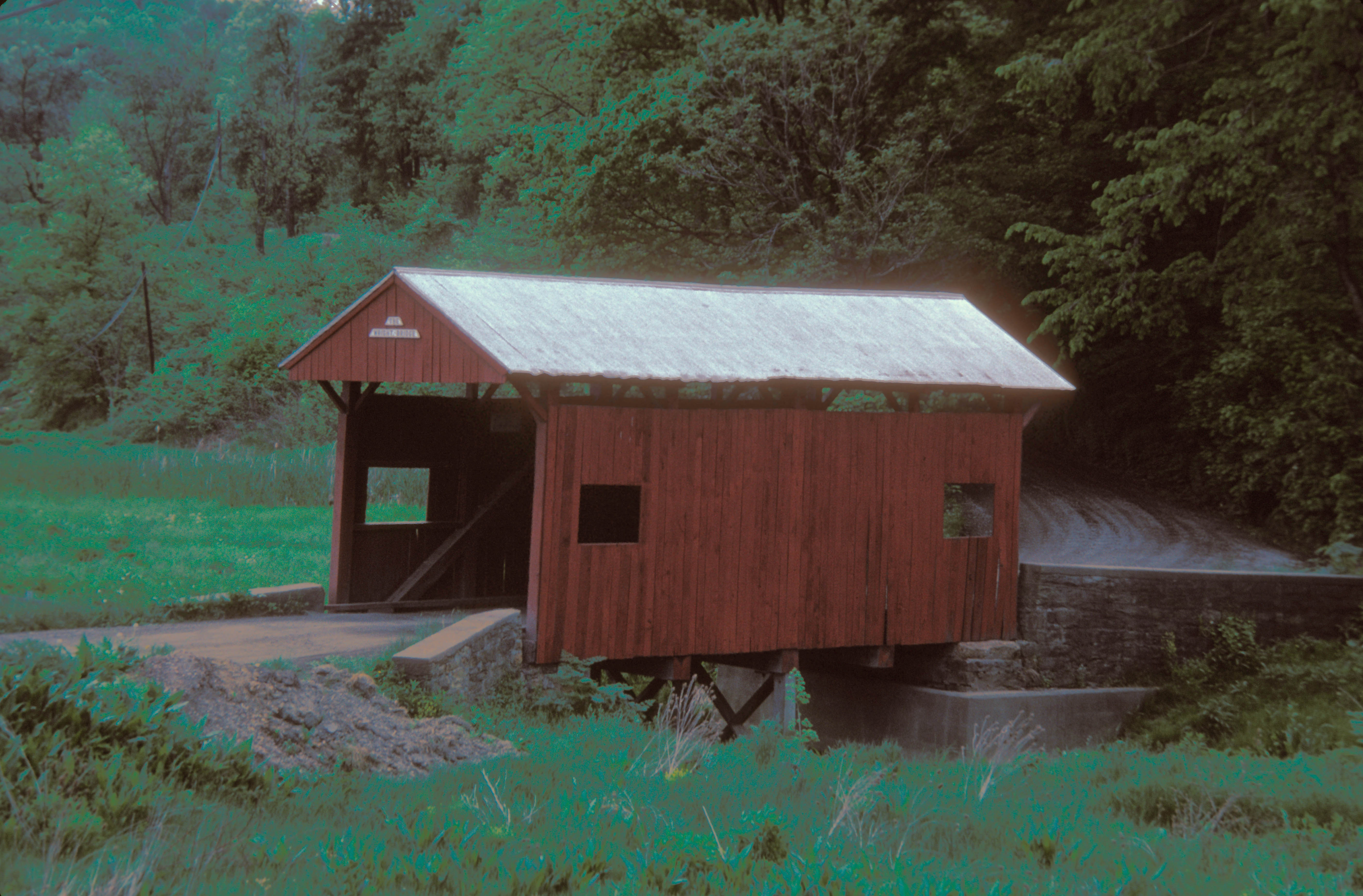
- Cerl Wright Covered Bridge

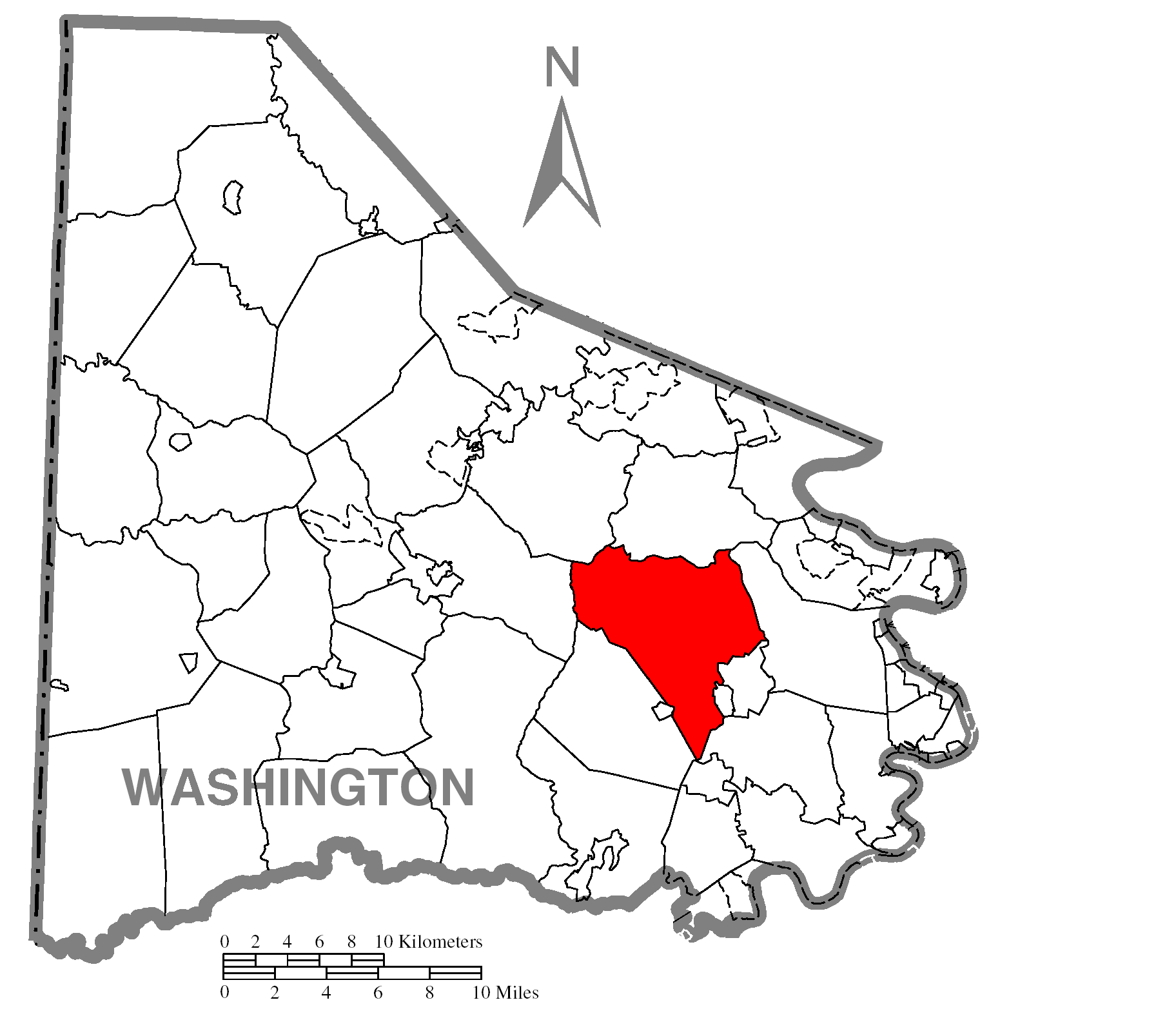
- Location of Somerset Township in Washington County

- Location of Washington County in Pennsylvania
- Country: United States
- State: Pennsylvania
- County: Washington County

Area
  - Total: 32.19 sq mi (83.36 km^{2})
  - Land: 32.15 sq mi (83.26 km^{2})
  - Water: 0.039 sq mi (0.10 km^{2})

Population (2020)
  - Total: 2,579 ▼
  - Estimate (2021): 2,570
  - Density: 82.5/sq mi (31.84/km^{2})
- Time zone: UTC-4 (EST)
  - Summer (DST): UTC-5 (EDT)
- Area code: 724
- FIPS code: 42-125-71792
- Website: https://www.somersettownship.com/

Historical population
Census	Pop.	Note	%±
2000	2,701		—
2010	2,684		−0.6%
2020	2,579		−3.9%
2025 (est.)	2,538		−1.6%
U.S. Decennial Census

Somerset Township is a township in Washington County, Pennsylvania, United States. The population was 2,579 at the 2020 census.

== History ==
The Huffman Distillery and Chopping Mill and Cerl Wright Covered Bridge are listed on the National Register of Historic Places.

== Geography ==
According to the United States Census Bureau, the township has a total area of 32.2 square miles (83 km^{2}), of which, 32.1 square miles (83 km^{2}) of it is land and 0.1 square miles (0.26 km^{2}) of it (0.25%) is water. It contains part of the census-designated place of Eighty Four.

== Demographics ==
At the 2000 census there were 2,701 people, 1,051 households, and 810 families living in the township. The population density was 84.2 people per square mile (32.5 people/km^{2}). There were 1,126 housing units at an average density of 35.1 per square mile (13.6/km^{2}). The racial makeup of the township was 99.04% White, 0.19% African American, 0.07% Asian, 0.26% from other races, and 0.44% from two or more races. Hispanic or Latino of any race were 0.41%.

Of the 1,051 households 29.8% had children under the age of 18 living with them, 64.5% were married couples living together, 8.8% had a female householder with no husband present, and 22.9% were non-families. 19.1% of households were one person and 9.0% were one person aged 65 or older. The average household size was 2.57 and the average family size was 2.94.

The age distribution was 21.3% under the age of 18, 6.7% from 18 to 24, 28.5% from 25 to 44, 28.0% from 45 to 64, and 15.5% 65 or older. The median age was 42 years. For every 100 females there were 100.4 males. For every 100 females age 18 and over, there were 98.3 males.

The median household income was $43,594 and the median family income was $52,102. Males had a median income of $37,100 versus $22,481 for females. The per capita income for the township was $20,146. About 7.0% of families and 9.5% of the population were below the poverty line, including 18.3% of those under age 18 and 4.9% of those age 65 or over.
