= Eighty Four, Pennsylvania =

Unincorporated community in Pennsylvania, US

- Census-designated place
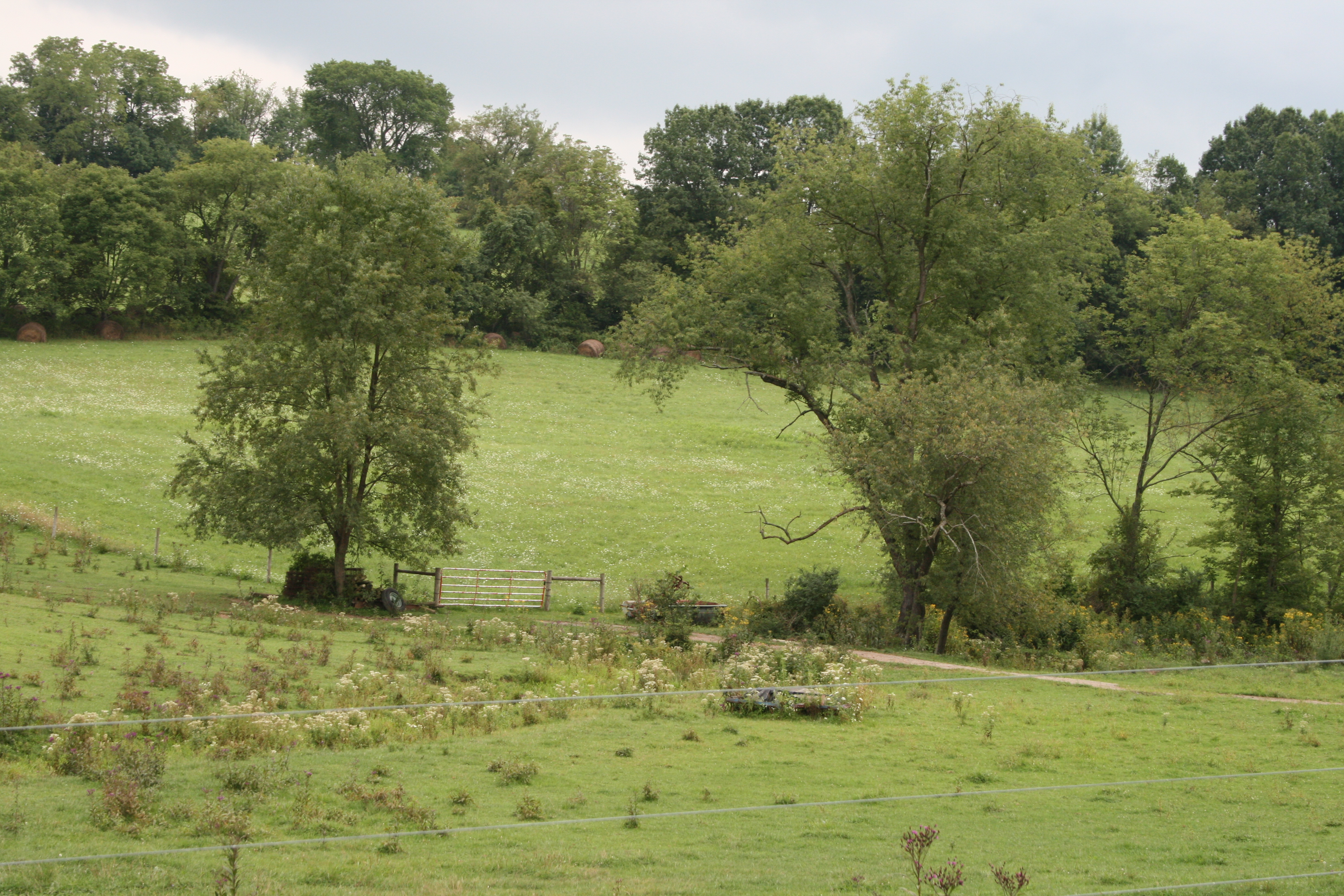
- Countryside in Eighty Four, Pennsylvania

- Location of Eighty Four in Pennsylvania Eighty Four (the United States)
- Coordinates: 40°10′55″N 80°7′59″W
- Country: United States
- State: Pennsylvania
- County: Washington

Area
  - Total: 6.60 sq mi (17.10 km^{2})
  - Land: 6.60 sq mi (17.10 km^{2})
  - Water: 0 sq mi (0.00 km^{2})
- Elevation: 1,049 ft (320 m)

Population (2020)
  - Total: 645
  - Density: 97.7/sq mi (37.73/km^{2})
- Time zone: UTC-5 (Eastern (EST))
  - Summer (DST): UTC-4 (EDT)
- ZIP Codes: 15330
- Area code: 724
- FIPS code: 42-22736
- GNIS feature ID: 1174062

Eighty Four is a census-designated place in Somerset, Nottingham, North Strabane, and South Strabane townships in Washington County, Pennsylvania. It lies approximately 25 miles (40 km) southwest of Pittsburgh and is in the Pittsburgh metropolitan area. The population was 645 at the 2020 census.

Eighty Four contains the 84 Lumber company's headquarters. Eighty Four is a part of the Canon-McMillan, Trinity, Ringgold, and Bentworth school districts.

Eighty Four is accessible via PA Route 519 and PA Route 136 and interstates 79 and 70. The closest international airport is the Pittsburgh International Airport approximately 25 miles (40 km) northwest of Eighty Four in Findlay Township, Pennsylvania.

Historical population
Census	Pop.	Note	%±
2010	657		—
2020	645		−1.8%
U.S. Decennial Census

== Origin of name ==
Eighty Four was originally named Smithville. Due to postal confusion with another town of the same name, its name was changed to "Eighty Four" on July 28, 1884. The origin of the name is uncertain; it has been suggested that the town was named in honor of Grover Cleveland's victory in the 1884 United States presidential election, but that occurred after the town was named. Another possibility is the town's mile marker on the Baltimore and Ohio Railroad. Possibly the most prosaic yet interesting claim however, published in Eighty Four's centennial is that the town was named after the year the town's post office was built, by a postmaster who "didn't have a whole lot of imagination."

== Education ==
The census-designated place is divided between the following school districts, based on the townships: Trinity Area School District (South Strabane Township), Canon-McMillan School District (North Strabane Township), and Bentworth School District (Somerset Township).

== See also ==
- List of places with numeric names
