= Swindell Bridge =

Bridge in Pittsburgh

E. H. Swindell Bridge
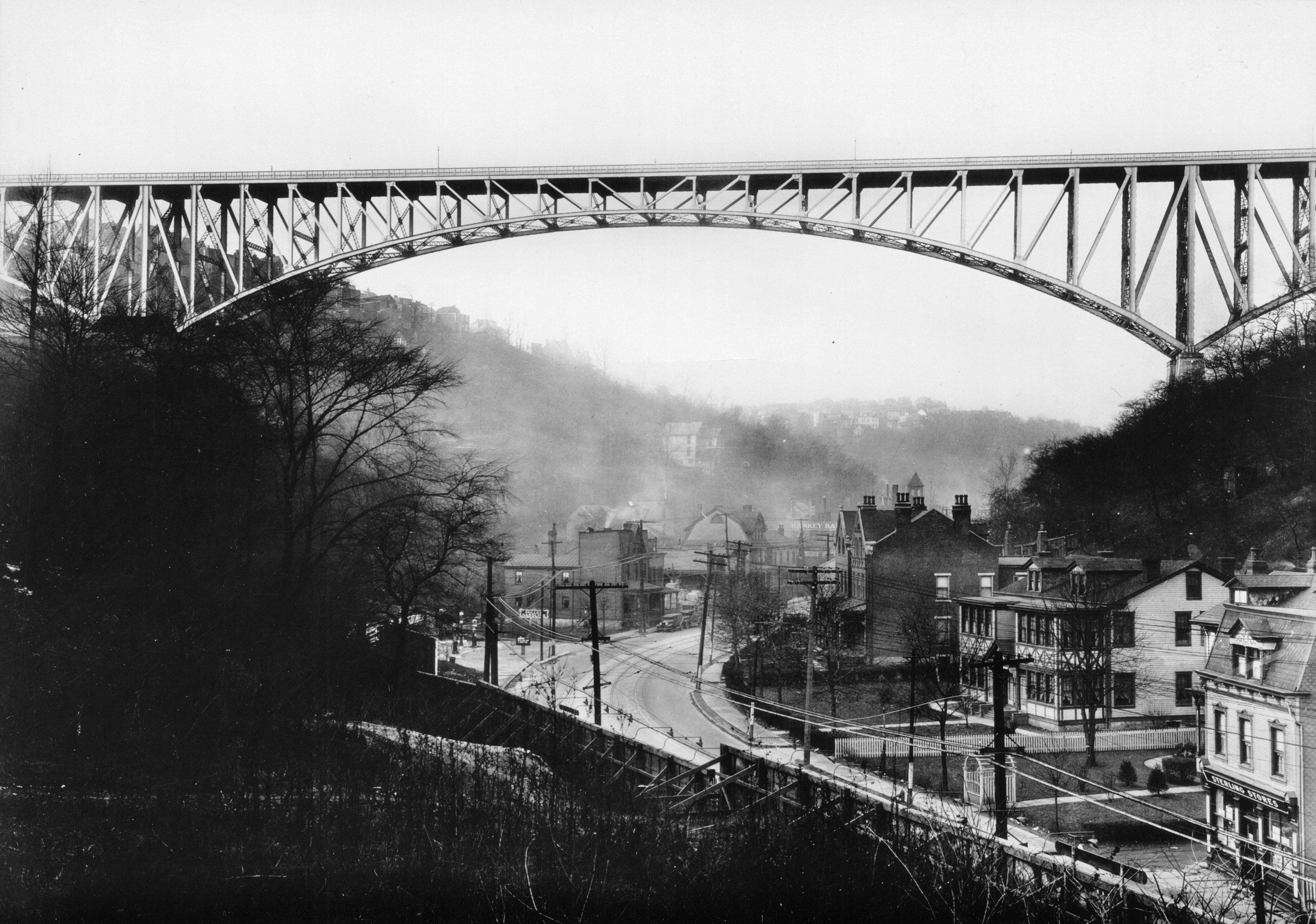
- The bridge in 1931
- Coordinates: 40°28′20″N 80°0′19″W
- Crosses: East Street Valley, Interstate 279, East Street
- Other name: East Street Bridge
- Named for: Edward H. Swindell
- Owner: City of Pittsburgh

Characteristics
- Material: Steel
- Total length: 1,097 feet (334 m)
- Width: 28 feet (8.5 m)
- Longest span: 545 feet (166 m)
- No. of spans: 3

History
- Constructed by: Independent Bridge Company
- Construction cost: $925,000
- Inaugurated: September 15, 1930

History
- Built: 1929–1930

Location
- Interactive map of E. H. Swindell Bridge

The E. H. Swindell Bridge is a steel deck truss cantilever bridge located in Pittsburgh, Pennsylvania, United States. The bridge connects the adjoining hilltop neighborhoods of Perry South, Spring Hill–City View, and Northview Heights on the city's North Side. It spans a ravine known as East Street Valley or Butcher's Run which was formerly a residential neighborhood but is now occupied by Interstate 279.

The bridge was designated a Historic Landmark by the Pittsburgh History and Landmarks Foundation in 2003.

== Design ==
The Swindell Bridge is a three-span Pratt deck truss cantilever bridge with arched lower chords. It is 1,097 feet (334 m) long, with a 545-foot (166 m) main span, and has a 28-foot (8.5 m) wide deck carrying two traffic lanes and two sidewalks. When built, the height of the bridge above the ravine floor was over 200 feet (61 m). After the construction of Interstate 279 in the late 1980s, the height of the bridge is about 160 feet (49 m).

== History ==
A bridge over East Street Valley had been requested since the early 1900s, mainly by business organizations which wanted to open the sparsely populated City View neighborhood for development. With support from State Senator Morris Einstein, approximately $925,000 in funding for the bridge was raised via city bond issues in 1919 and 1926 and a county bond issue in 1924. Contracts for the bridge substructure and approaches were awarded to Booth and Flinn, while the Pittsburgh-based Independent Bridge Company was responsible for building the steel superstructure.

The bridge foundations were built between January and August, 1929, followed by the steel superstructure. The main cantilever span was constructed starting from both ends and meeting in the middle. When the two sections were joined, it was discovered that the vertical alignment was off by 2 inches (5.1 cm) due to an engineering mistake, resulting in a visible defect. Engineers concluded that the strength of the bridge was not compromised, so the structure was left as it was. The finished bridge was dedicated on September 15, 1930, in a ceremony which was cut short by heavy rain. It was named for Edward H. Swindell (1867–1928), a North Side businessman who was one of the bridge's early proponents.

Upon opening, the bridge was criticized as a "bridge to nowhere" and was nicknamed the "Scandal Bridge" as the anticipated City View development boom failed to materialize. Although built to highway standards, the bridge terminated onto an unpaved road and was used by only a handful of residents who lived nearby. The Pittsburgh Press reported in 1932 that fewer than 100 cars and trucks were crossing the bridge each day and that children could be found playing in the roadway as vehicles passed by only about every 10 minutes. Moreover, the bridge's isolated location made it a popular place for pranks, vandalism, and suicides. Rocks, bricks, and other items were frequently thrown from the bridge, endangering the East Street Valley residents who lived underneath, and police estimated that about fifty people had jumped from the span by 1952. The city installed 10-foot (3.0 m) wire mesh fencing on the bridge in the early 1960s, but this did not entirely curb the problems.

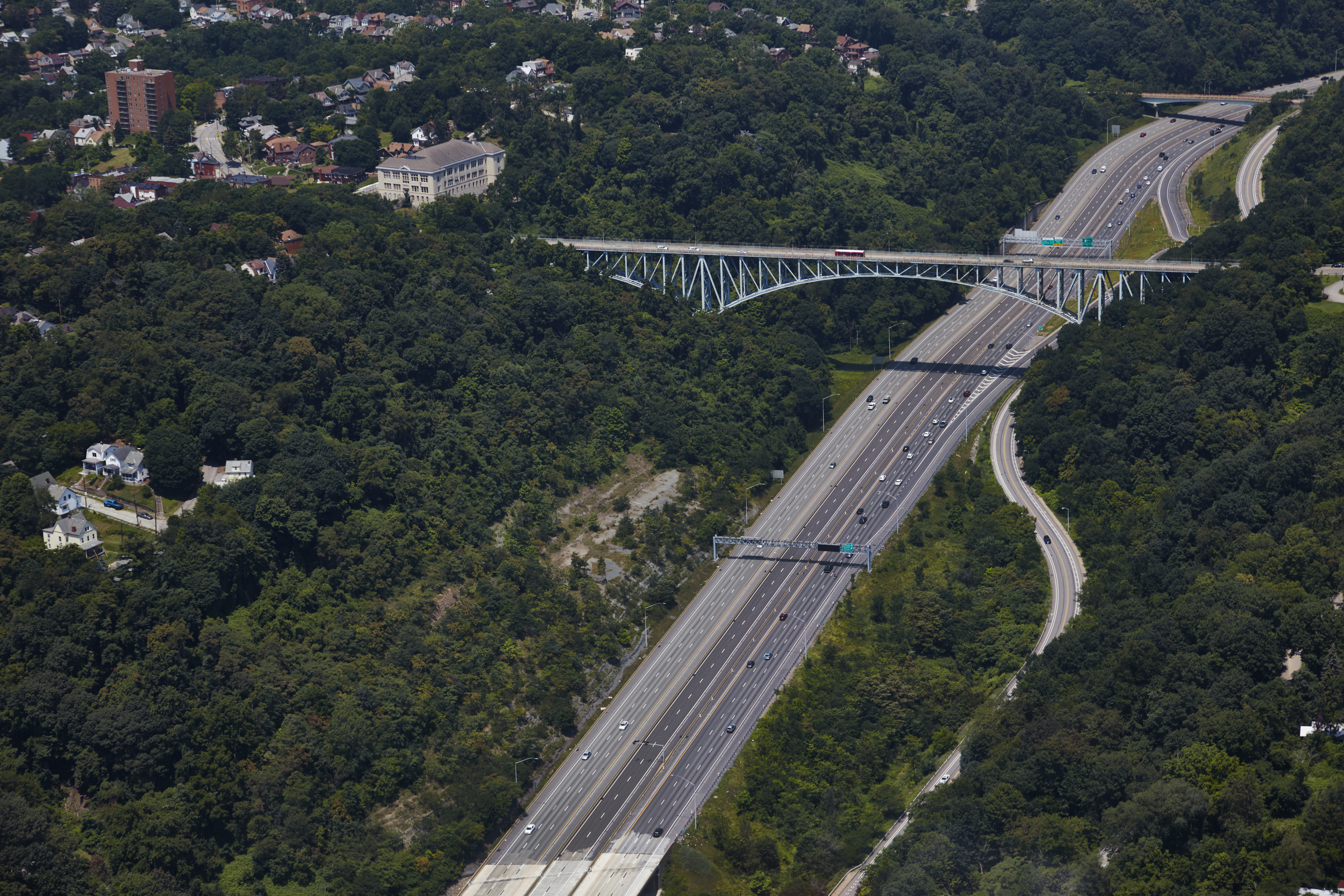
Aerial photo of the Swindell Bridge by Carol M. Highsmith, 2019

The bridge finally began to carry a significant amount of traffic after the opening of the 999-unit Northview Heights housing project in 1962. By this point, the bridge was starting to deteriorate, and it was closed in 1969 for repairs to the structure, roadway, sidewalks, and curbing, at a cost of $600,000. A more extensive rehabilitation, including replacement of the deck, sidewalks, and lighting, improved drainage, and reinforcement of the steel structure, was completed in 1988.

In the wake of the 2022 collapse of the Fern Hollow Bridge, the Swindell Bridge was identified as another of Pittsburgh's most deficient bridges, having been rated as poor since 2009 with issues including "heavy rusting, exposed rebar and missing or leaking seals". In July 2022, debris fell onto I-279 while a crew was performing emergency paving work on the bridge, prompting the city to close the span to traffic. An inspection concluded that the material fell from a torn drainage trough in one of the bridge's expansion joints. The city was unable to replace the trough due to the 2021–2023 global supply chain crisis, so a temporary repair was effected by simply welding steel plate over the expansion joint. The bridge reopened in September 2022.

The bridge was closed again in July–August 2023 to replace damaged steel beams at the west end of the span. A single-lane restriction on the bridge was supposed to be removed after completing this work, but was kept in effect after still more damaged beams were found. The bridge is planned to undergo a full rehabilitation with construction tentatively estimated to begin in 2027.
