= Brighton Heights (Pittsburgh) =

- Neighborhood of Pittsburgh
- Coordinates: 40.484°N 80.037°W
- Country: United States
- State: Pennsylvania
- County: Allegheny County
- City: Pittsburgh

Area
  - Total: 1.117 sq mi (2.89 km^{2})

Population (2010)
  - Total: 7,247
  - Density: 6,488/sq mi (2,505/km^{2})
- ZIP Code: 15212

Brighton Heights is a neighborhood in Pittsburgh, Pennsylvania's northside area. It has a zip code of 15212, and has representation on Pittsburgh City Council by the council member for District 1 (North Neighborhoods). The Western gateway to the neighborhood, Brighton Heights Boulevard, is opposite the McKees Rocks Bridge and accessible via Route 65/Ohio River Boulevard. The Pittsburgh Bureau of Fire houses 35 Engine and 33 Truck (formerly 34 Truck) in Brighton Heights.

Once a predominantly German area, Brighton Heights now has a varied ethnic mix. The community is notable for its solid stately architecture, with many fine early 20th Century homes and churches built of stone and brick, featuring stained glass windows and ornamental woodwork and fireplaces. Because of the high quality and variety of the architecture of the neighborhood, Brighton Heights is one of the regularly featured neighborhoods of Pittsburgh's annual house tours.

Brighton Heights was featured in the July 2006 issue of Pittsburgh magazine article entitled "No Place Like Home: 10 Neighborhoods you need to know about." Many of Brighton Heights' streets are lined with large maple trees, maintained by the City of Pittsburgh. Recreational opportunities include the adjacent Riverview Park, the Jack Stack pool, and Marmaduke Playground.

Historical population
Year	Pop.	±%
1940	11,515	—
1950	11,847	+2.9%
1960	11,483	−3.1%
1970	10,604	−7.7%
1980	9,122	−14.0%
1990	8,580	−5.9%
2000	8,050	−6.2%
2010	7,247	−10.0%
2020	7,105	−2.0%
Source: University of Pittsburgh WPRDC

== Surrounding neighborhoods ==
Brighton Heights has four borders, including Ross Township to the north, Bellevue to the northwest, and the Pittsburgh neighborhoods of Perry North, to the east, and Marshall-Shadeland from the south to the west.

== Places of interest ==
- Riverview Park Pittsburgh in adjacent Perry North
- Jack Stack Swimming Pool Part of the Pittsburgh Parks & Recreation Department pool system.
- Marmaduke Playground has a Playground, DekHockey, and a Baseball field.
- Carnegie Library of Pittsburgh, Woods Run branch A small branch library with books, magazines, movie DVDs, music CDs and a computer cluster.
- Tom Friday's Market A butcher and grocer serving the area since 1955.

Brighton Heights Citizens Federation (BHCF) is a volunteer-led community organization formed in 1967 to improve the neighborhood and quality of life for its residents. The BHCF committees host annual events like The Memorial Day Tribute, Bright the Night, The Halloween Parade, and The House Tour. BHCF also maintains about a dozen community flower gardens, and hosts 2 community clean up events per year. Regular public meetings are held to encourage event and committee participation and public safety initiatives.

== Transportation ==
Brighton Heights is served by Pittsburgh Regional Transit routes 13 Bellevue, 16 Brighton, and 17 Shadeland.

== City Steps ==
The Brighton Heights neighborhood has 11 distinct flights of city steps - all of which are open and in a safe condition. In Brighton Heights, the public stairways in Pittsburgh quickly connect pedestrians to public transportation and provide an easy way to travel through the neighborhood.

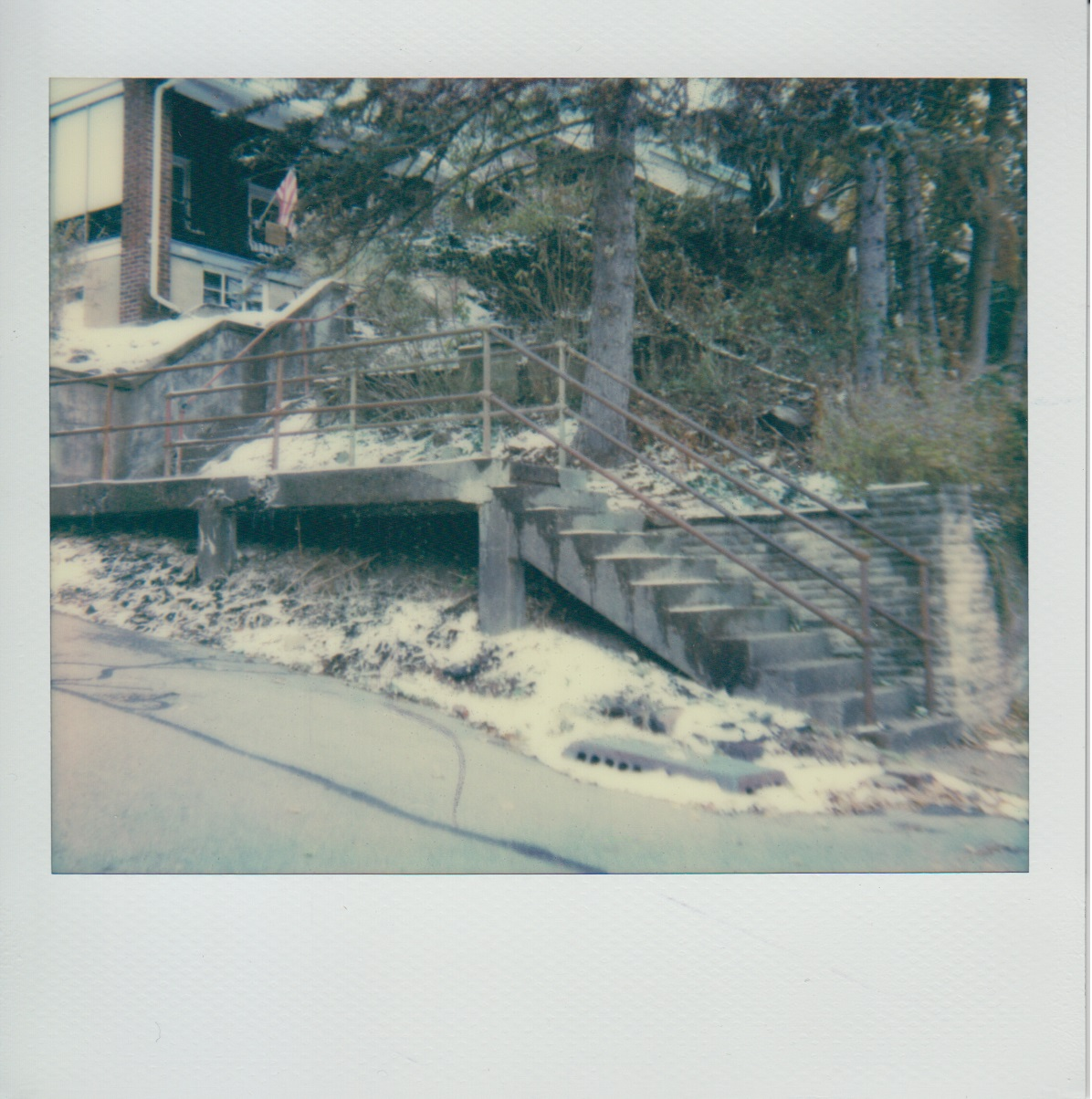
The Termon Avenue city steps in Brighton Heights

== Bridges ==
The Davis Avenue Bridge, which opened in 1899, spanned over Woods Run Ave. and directly connected Brighton Heights with Riverview Park in the Perry North neighborhood. After decades of deterioration and a lack of funding for a complete overhaul, the bridge closed to vehicular traffic in August 2001. By April 2009, it was determined that the bridge could collapse at any time, thus several residents whose houses were situated under the bridge on Woods Run Ave. were forced to evacuate. With a call made for its immediate destruction, the Davis Avenue Bridge was brought down with explosives on May 6, 2009. Since then, many long time residents of Brighton Heights have been distressed that this now unique transition to public green space no longer exists and are determined to bring the funding for a new bridge. WPXI Report In Spring of 2025, a new pedestrian bridge was opened to the public.

Wilksboro Bridge is a foot bridge that has been closed to pedestrians (see waymarking.com Orphaned Bridges) with plans to rebuild a new one. KDKA Report

== See also ==
- List of Pittsburgh neighborhoods
