= Wigle Whiskey =

Artisan small batch whiskey distillery

Coordinates: 40.454542°N 79.981584°W

Wigle Whiskey Distillery
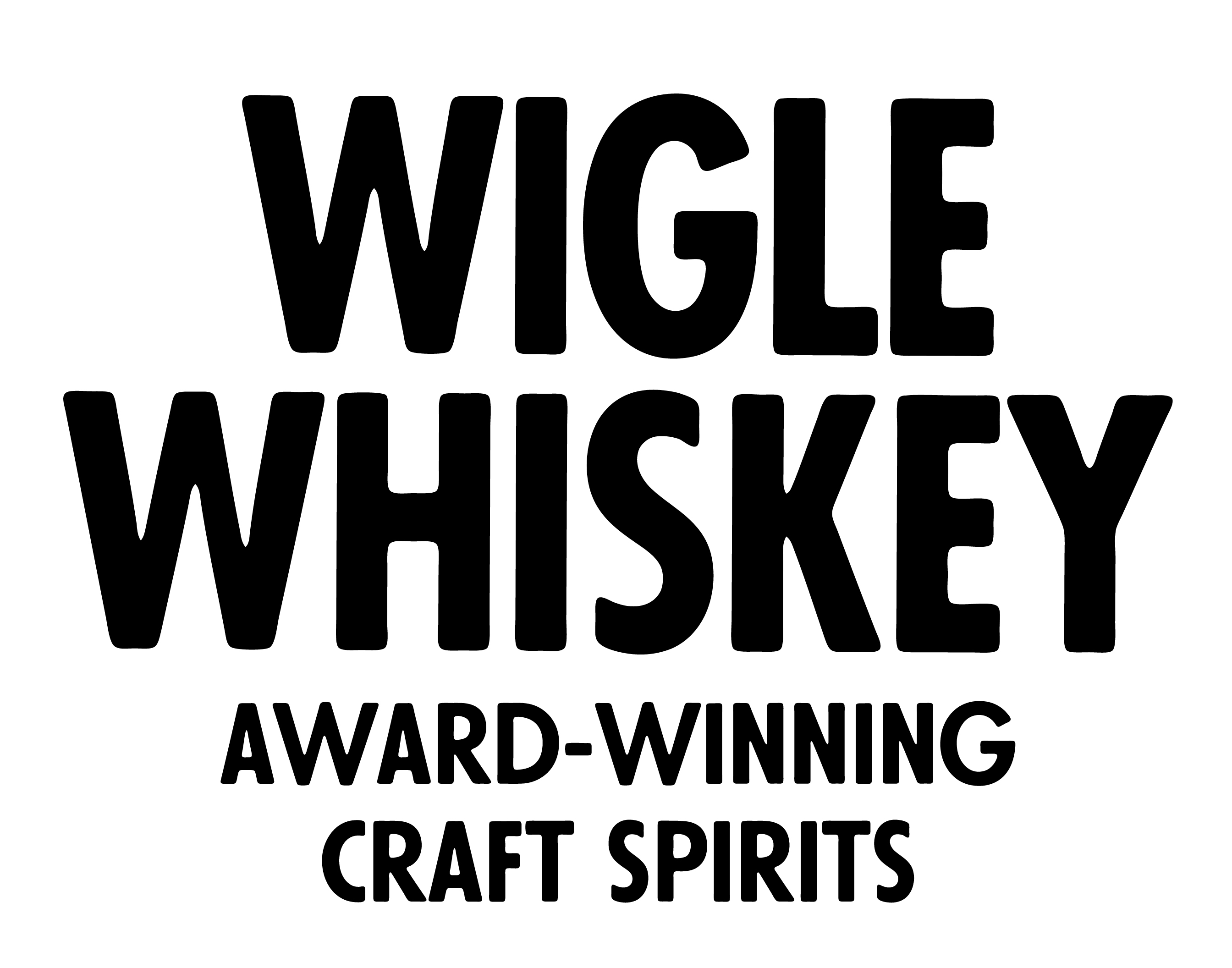

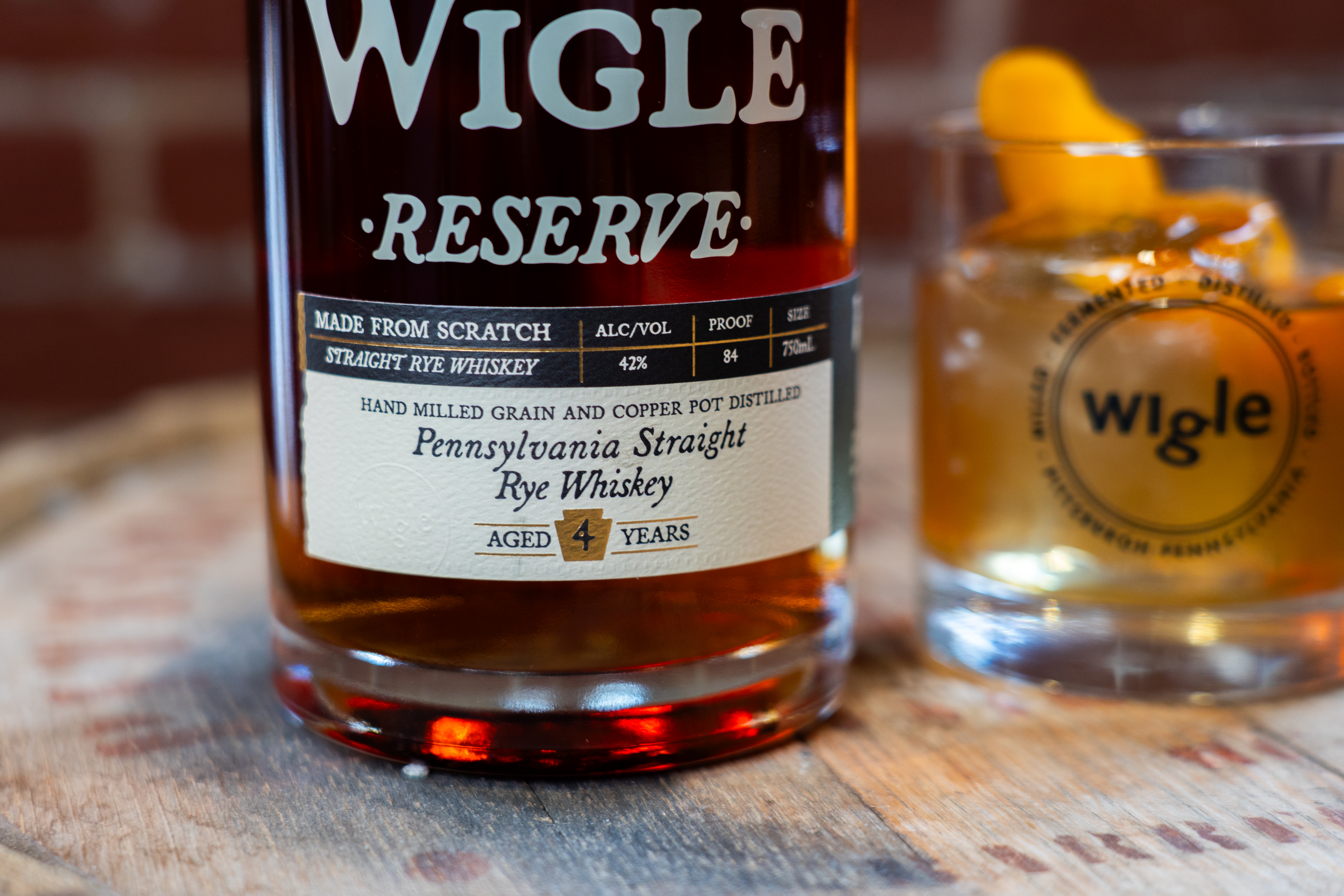
- Industry: Craft spirits
- Founded: 2012
- Headquarters: 2401 Smallman St, Pittsburgh, PA 15222, Pittsburgh
- Website: wiglewhiskey.com

Wigle Whiskey (pronounced "wih-gul") is an American small batch whiskey distillery in the Strip District neighborhood of Pittsburgh. Wigle's whiskeys are the flagship products of the company, which was entirely family owned and operated until 2022, when the company and its sister company Threadbare Cider and Mead was purchased by the Nutting Corporation.

== History ==
Wigle began operations in 2011 and opened its doors to the public in March 2012. Wigle was the first distillery to open in Pittsburgh since Joseph S. Finch's distillery, located at South Second and McKean streets, closed in the 1920s. At that time, only two other distilleries existed in the rest of Pennsylvania. The founders of Wigle Whiskey were instrumental to the passage of Pennsylvania House Bill 242 in December 2011, establishing a new distillery license allowing craft distilleries to sell their own products onsite, which led to the growth of craft distilleries in Pennsylvania and the ability for Wigle to sell its spirits directly to consumers.

Wigle was founded by Mark Meyer, Mary Ellen Meyer, Meredith Meyer Grelli, Eric Meyer, Alexander Grelli, and Jeff Meyer. They named the distillery after Philip Wigle, a man convicted of treason in 1794 and sentenced to hang for his actions in the Whiskey Rebellion, wherein Alexander Hamilton levied the first excise tax on whiskey, triggering four years of protests and riots. Wigle was one of the Whiskey Rebellion's earliest agitators, culminating in his assault of a Western Pennsylvania district tax collector. George Washington, despite his outrage and contempt for Wigle, later pardoned him, as he feared hanging the rebel would stir a civil war in the young nation.

Wigle Whiskey was at the center of the 'Pennsylvania Rye Revival' and the growth of Pittsburgh's whiskey heritage tourism. (Note: Przybylek (2017) describes how historical views of the Whiskey Rebellion changed over time. Historians and organizers of civic commemorations of the Whiskey Rebellion tended to see rebellion in negative terms up until the 1960s, when progressive historical scholarship produced more positive perspectives on dissent. By 2008, a marketing firm named Brandmill was able to create the "Whiskey Rebellion II" campaign against a drink tax imposed by the Allegheny County government on Pittsburgh area restaurants, taverns, and banquet halls (see Young, Chris (October 25, 2007). "Whiskey Rebellion II". Pittsburgh City Paper. Pittsburgh, PA.).) The distillery offers tours every Saturday and explores the history of the Whiskey Rebellion, as well as the distilling process, Wigle's spirits, and a tasting. Founders Mark Meyer and Meredith Meyer Grelli authored The Whiskey Rebellion & the Rebirth of Rye: A Pittsburgh Story, which explores rye's origins and the role Pittsburgh played in its rediscovery, while also providing a guide to making rye whiskey and recipes for cocktails.

Wigle partners with community and non-profit organizations regularly. For example, in 2018, Wigle worked with Pittsburgh's Heinz History Center on a Prohibition Rye whiskey to accompany the museum's "American Spirits: The Rise and Fall of Prohibition" exhibition. Wigle has also partnered with other museums, including Pittsburgh's Mattress Factory and Carnegie Science Center, Cumberland's Allegheny Museum, and Washington, D.C.'s Smithsonian's National Museum of American History.

Wigle actively supports the development of a Whiskey Rebellion Trail following the Great Allegheny Passage, a trail that extends from Pittsburgh through Southwestern and South Central Pennsylvania and Maryland to Mt. Vernon, home to George Washington's homestead and the distilleries he owned. To this end, Wigle partnered with the Omni Bedford Springs Hotel in Bedford, Pennsylvania, a borough about 100 miles southeast of Pittsburgh where General Washington led his troops during the Whiskey Rebellion. Formerly, Wigle also supported local non-profits with money raised while participating in the Whiskey Rebellion Heritage Festival.

In 2013, the Meyer family opened a dedicated facility in Spring Garden in Pittsburgh's North Side, the Wigle Whiskey Barrelhouse and Garden. A former produce warehouse, the barrelhouse provided a place for tastings and tours up until 2019 with the purchase of the new facility on Smallman Street in the Strip District. The facility formerly hosted weekly bottle labeling parties every Tuesday, where guests could assist in the packaging process in exchange for drink tokens. The barrelhouse now serves as Wigle's storage and distribution center. Wigle also purchased two vacant lots alongside the barrelhouse to develop gardens for herbs and other botanicals used in its spirits.

In April 2017, Wigle opened a craft cocktail bar and bottle shop, the Wigle Whiskey Tasting Room, at the Omni William Penn Hotel; this space closed during the COVID-19 global pandemic.

Also in 2017, Wigle founders established a craft ciderhouse in Pittsburgh's Spring Garden neighborhood as Wigle Whiskey's sister company responsible for non-spirit alcohol production. Threadbare Cider and Mead serves as an homage to Pittsburgh-native Johnny 'Appleseed' Chapman, who spread apple seeds harvested from the banks of the Monongahela River across Ohio and Indiana, providing new orchards for pioneering Americans. Threadbare produces a variety of ciders and meads, as well as a made-from-scratch pizza kitchen.

In 2018, Wigle opened the Wigle Whiskey Tasting Room and Bottle Shop in Ross Park Mall in Ross Township.

In 2019, Wigle worked with Aramark to open a bar and restaurant lounge in the Pittsburgh International Airport in Concourse A.

In 2020, Wigle opened expanded the Wigle Whiskey Distillery, featuring a state-of-the-art production facility with two German copper stills, craft cocktail bar, farm-to-table restaurant, bottle shop, and two reservable event rooms, in Pittsburgh's Strip District. The Distillery provides more room for tastings, tours, production, events, and community programs.

In spring 2024, Wigle launched the Wigle Bar at North Shore, a gastropub concept, in the ground level of PNC Park near the Roberto Clemente Bridge on in Federal Street in Pittsburgh's North Shore.

Throughout the year, Wigle supports various farmers markets and other special community festivals and events through pop-up kiosks. During the holiday shopping season, Wigle also provides pop-up kiosks in Pittsburgh's South Hills Village Mall in Upper St. Clair Township and Giant Eagle at Settlers Ridge in Robinson Township.

== Process ==
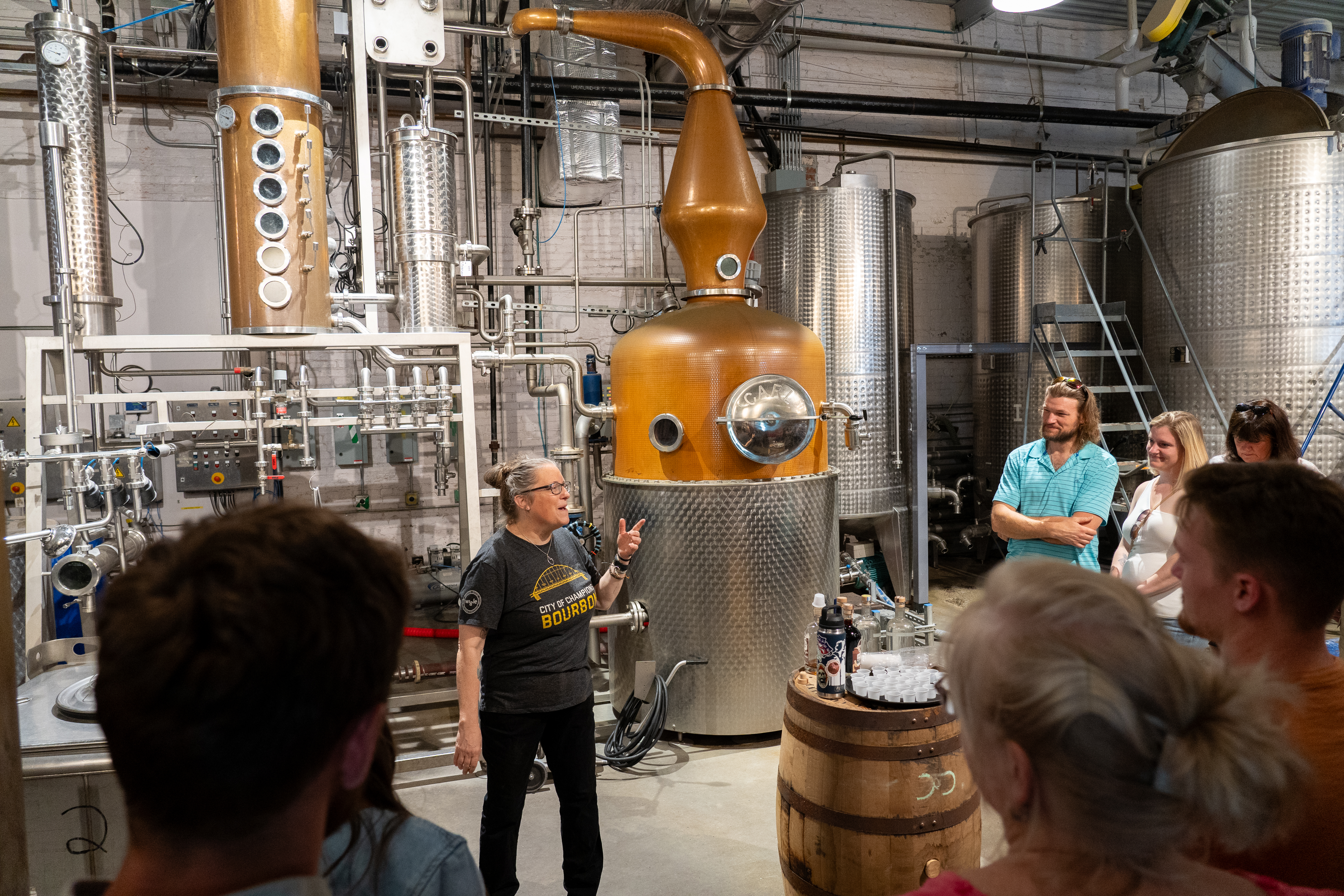
Distillery tour, 2024

Wigle is a scratch "grain-to-glass" distiller, sourcing nearly all of its ingredients within a 100-mile radius from Pittsburgh, obtaining its grains from nearby farms in Washington County, Pennsylvania, and eastern Ohio, and mills, distills, and serves its products on site. The Meyer family worked with the Artisan Distilling Program at Michigan State University throughout the distillery's earliest years. Wigle led a two-year study into regional terroir by producing batches of Rye Whiskey from rye grain sourced from farms in Saskatchewan, Minnesota, and Pennsylvania. The distillery found differences in the tastes and compounds of the resulting whiskeys that could be traced back to the regional grains used in the distilling process.

== Products ==
Wigle Whiskey produces a wide array of small batch, handcrafted, award-winning spirits across various categories, including, but not limited to: American rye whiskeys, Pennsylvania bourbons, American wheat whiskeys, flavored and barrel-finished whiskey variants, Dutch-style gins, rums, vodkas, aquavits, liqueurs, bitters, and ready-to-drink bottled cocktails. Wigle's Pennsylvania Straight Bourbon was the first bourbon produced in the Commonwealth of Pennsylvania in more than 40 years.

== Awards ==
Two of Wigle's co-founders, Alex Grelli and Meredith Meyer Grelli, were named James Beard Award Semi-Finalists in 2018 and 2019.

From the American Craft Spirits Association, Wigle has won Best-in-Category for its Pennsylvania Straight Rye Whiskey in 2015, Best-in-Category for its Pennsylvania Straight Wheat Whiskey in 2016, Best-in-Class for its Dutch-Style Gin in 2016 and 2018, Gold for its Pennsylvania Straight Bourbon in 2019, the Innovation Award for its Eau de Pickle Aquavit in 2019, Best-in-Class for its Saffron Amaro in 2020, Best-in-Class for its Amaro Vermut in 2022, and Best-in-Class for its Peach Brandy in 2022.

The Distillery has been recognized as the most awarded craft distillery in the country by the American Craft Spirits Association in 2015, 2016, 2017, 2018, 2020, 2021 and 2025.

From 2012 through 2025, the Pittsburgh City Paper recognized Wigle Whiskey as Pittsburgh's Best Distillery. Additionally, from 2012 through 2023, Pittsburgh Magazine recognized Wigle Whiskey as Pittsburgh's Best Distillery.

== See also ==
- American Whiskey Trail
- Whiskey Rebellion
- Philip Wigle
- Alexander Hamilton
- George Washington
- Johnny Appleseed
- Pittsburgh, Pennsylvania
