= North Side (Pittsburgh) =

Region of Pittsburgh, Pennsylvania

Coordinates: 40.459°N 80.001°W

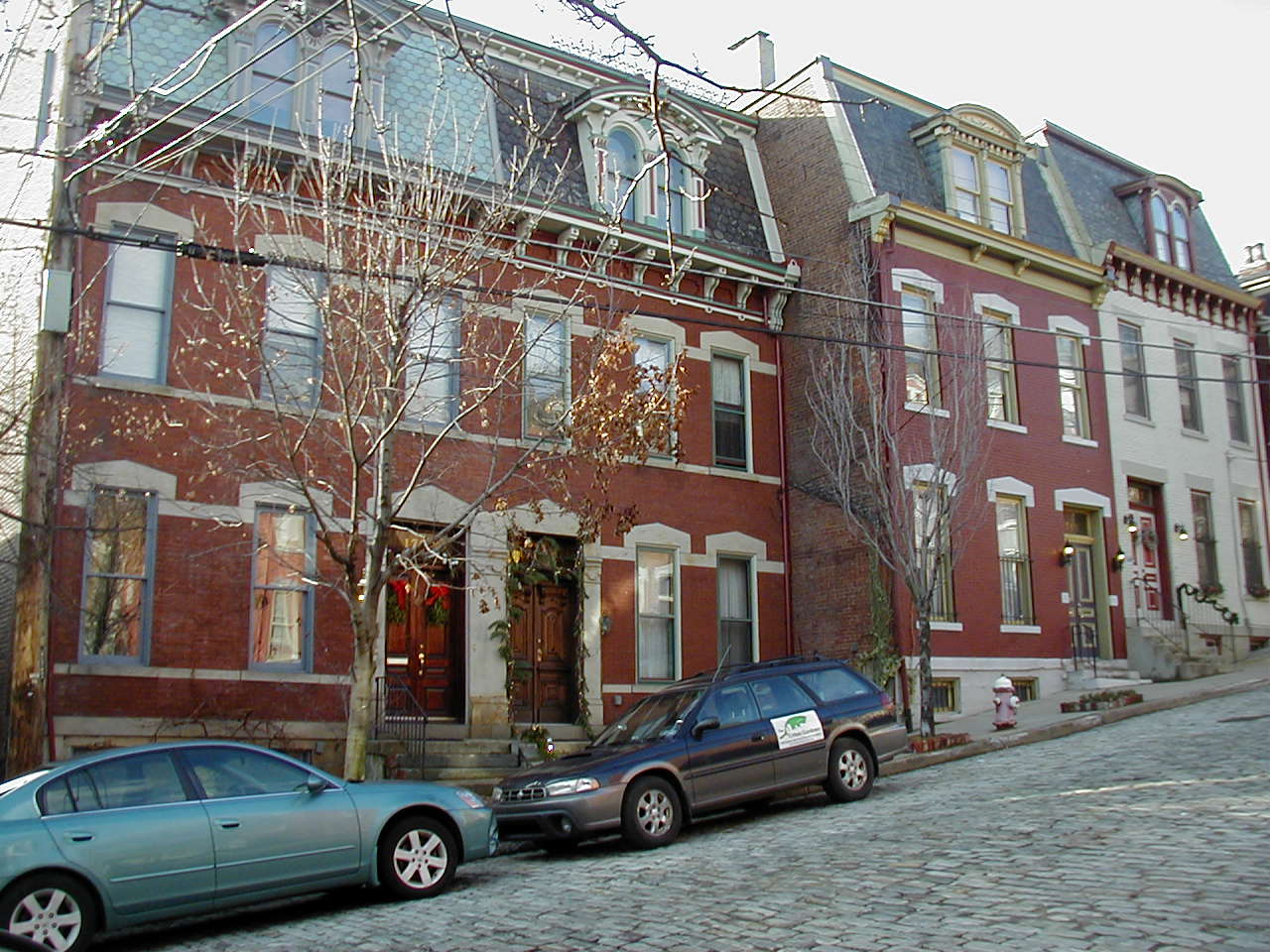
Row houses in the Mexican War Streets

The North Side (sometimes written as Northside) is the region of Pittsburgh, Pennsylvania, located to the north of the Allegheny River and the Ohio River.

The North Side is made up of the following neighborhoods: Allegheny Center, Allegheny West, Brighton Heights, California-Kirkbride, Central Northside, Chateau, East Allegheny, Fineview, Manchester, Marshall-Shadeland, North Shore, Northview Heights, Perry North, Perry South, Spring Garden, Spring Hill–City View, Summer Hill, and Troy Hill.

== History and famous residents ==
In 1828, the borough of Allegheny, Pennsylvania, was incorporated where the North Side now stands. It had a population of 1,000. In 1880, Allegheny was incorporated as a city. The City of Allegheny was annexed by Pittsburgh in 1907, and became known as the North Side.

Historians claim that the Felix Brunot mansion on Stockton Avenue (Allegheny Center) was once a station on the Underground Railroad, where fugitive slaves from the South stopped for food and shelter. The Allegheny regional branch of the Carnegie Library of Pittsburgh, located at 5 Allegheny Square (Allegheny Center), was the first tax-supported library in the United States. It is now closed to the public following a lightning strike on April 6, 2007. A new library opened nearby at 1230 Federal Street. Charles Taze Russell organized what are now known as Jehovah's Witnesses at a house in the old city of Allegheny.

Mary Cassatt was born on Rebecca Street in 1844. Today, Rebecca Street has become Reedsdale Street (in the North Shore neighborhood). If the house had not been torn down for Highway Route 65, it would be facing Heinz Field, the home of the Pittsburgh Steelers.

George Washington Gale Ferris Jr. lived at 1318 Arch Street (Central Northside) when he created the original Ferris Wheel for the 1893 Chicago World's Columbian Exposition in an attempt to create something as impressive as the Eiffel Tower in Paris, France.

The first World Series was played at Exposition Park by the Pittsburgh Pirates and the Boston Americans (now known as the Boston Red Sox) in 1903.

Gus & Yia-Yia's Iceball Stand, selling fresh popcorn, peanuts, and old-fashioned iceballs (similar to snow cones) hand-scraped from a block of ice, has been in West Park since 1934. The "orange concession stand with a brightly colored umbrella" is something of an unofficial Pittsburgh landmark during the summer months.

A 20-acre Allis-Chalmers transformer factory provided as many as 2,600 jobs to the area from 1897 until closing in the Summer of 1975.

== Places of interest ==
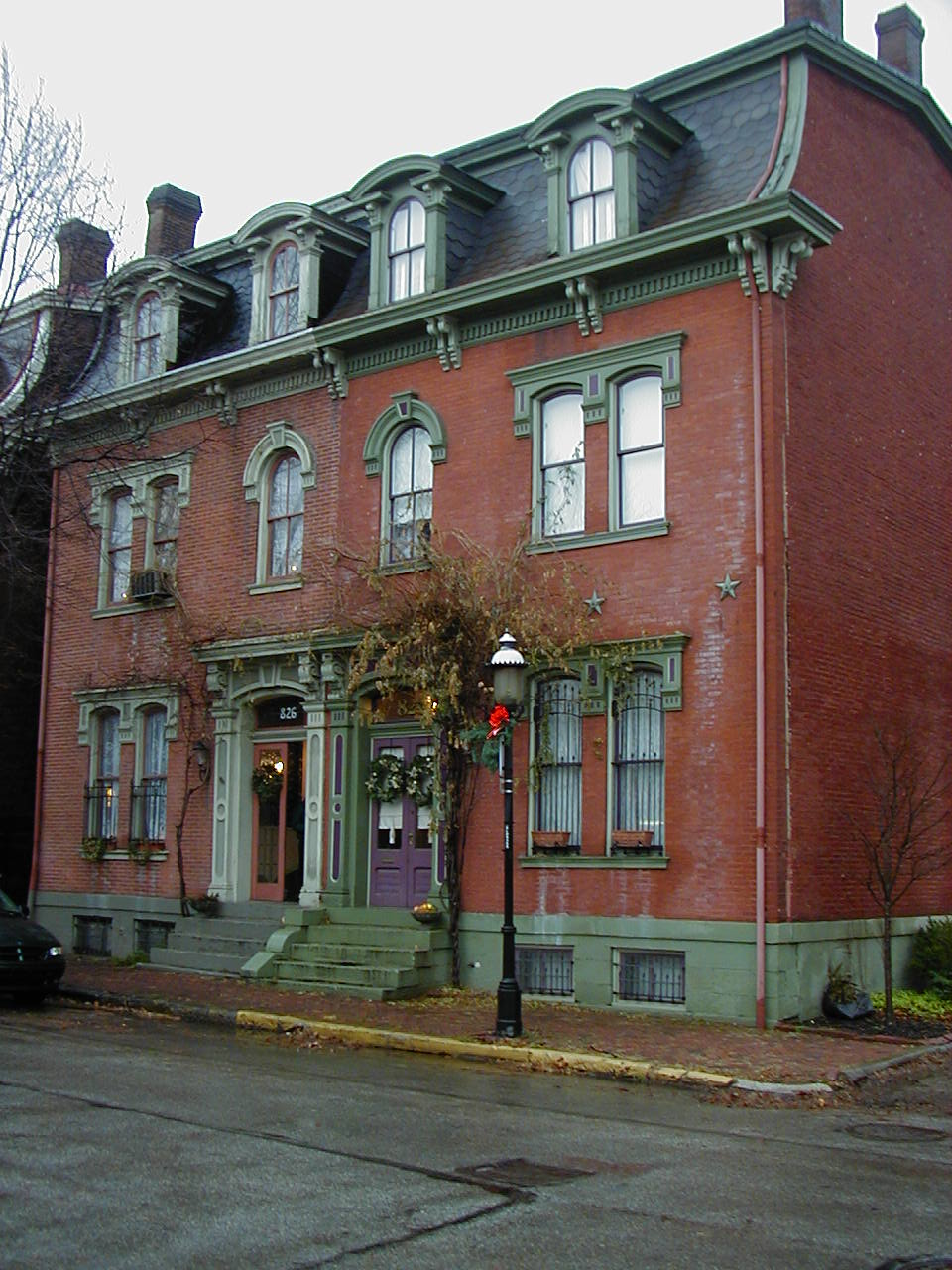
Victorian houses in Allegheny West

- 16th Street Bridge
- Allegheny Observatory
- Allegheny West historic district
- Andy Warhol Museum
- Kamin Science Center
- Children's Museum of Pittsburgh
- Community College of Allegheny County
- Deutschtown historic district
- Acrisure Stadium
- Manchester historic district
- Mattress Factory
- Mexican War Streets historic district located in Central North Side
- National Aviary
- Penn Brewery
- PNC Park
- Randyland
- Rivers Casino
- Riverview Park
- Stage AE
- West Park

== See also ==
- List of Pittsburgh neighborhoods
