= California-Kirkbride =

Neighborhood of Pittsburgh, Pennsylvania, United States

- Neighborhood of Pittsburgh
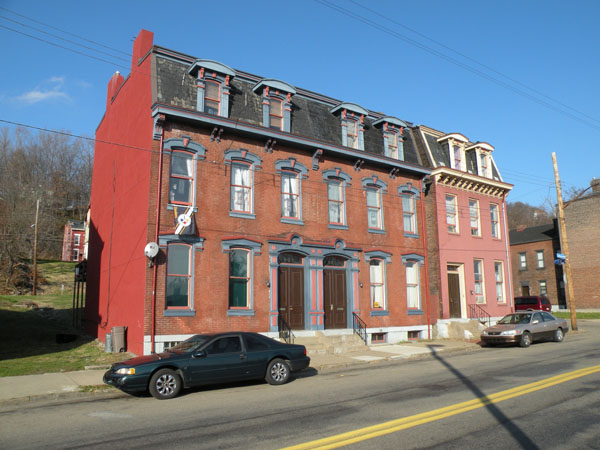
- Old Allegheny Rows Historic District

- Coordinates: 40.461°N 80.023°W
- Country: United States
- State: Pennsylvania
- County: Allegheny County
- City: Pittsburgh

Area
  - Total: 0.217 sq mi (0.56 km^{2})

Population (2010)
  - Total: 761
  - Density: 3,510/sq mi (1,350/km^{2})
- ZIP Code: 15233, 15212

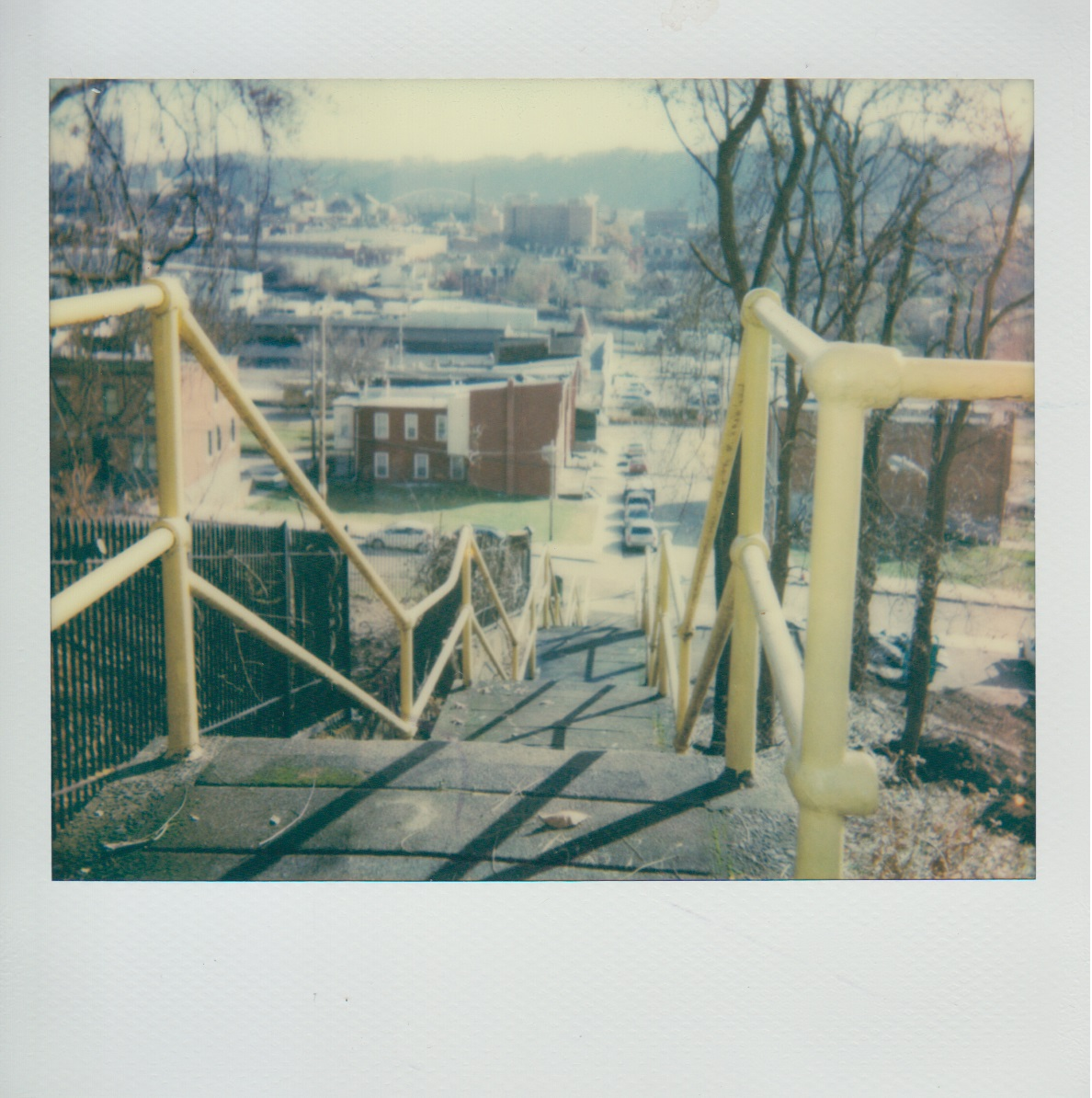
Saint Ives Street city steps in California-Kirkbride

California-Kirkbride is a neighborhood on Pittsburgh, Pennsylvania's North Side.

The neighborhood consists of a wedge of land between the railroad tracks at the northern edge of Manchester and a steep hill at the southern edges of Brightwood and Perry Hilltop. Put differently, the neighborhood is bounded by California and Allegheny Avenues on the West; by Pennsylvania Avenue on the South; by Brighton Road on the East; and by Island Avenue on the North. A former rail yard, now home to a United States Postal Service sorting facility, occupies most of the southern border, and Oliver High School, a high school in the Pittsburgh Public Schools system, is located just north of the neighborhood's northern border at Island Avenue.

Most of the neighborhood is located on the flat river plain that comprises the majority of old Allegheny City. The neighborhood developed along with Manchester and, according to a 1974 profile by Pittsburgh's Department of Planning, would likely be considered part of Manchester but for the railroad tracks that form a border between Manchester and California-Kirkbride. That profile states that: "Historically, this area had been part of Manchester but due to the barrier imposed by the railroad, it did not receive the industrial uses typical of Manchester except on its borders. However, it was affected by the racial shift in population which increased from about 3% Black in 1960 to about 35% in the 1970 census."

The neighborhood was developed almost exclusively between 1870 and 1900. During this period, industries including tanneries, slaughterhouses, and the local rail yard were flourishing in Allegheny City, and the men working in these industries needed housing for themselves and their families. To meet this need, several businessmen - often the owners of the businesses whose workers needed housing - bought land in California-Kirkbride and built rowhouses on it. The neighborhood thus consists almost entirely of rowhouses that were initially built for industrial workers and their families. A significant portion of the neighborhood's rowhouses were listed on the National Register of Historic Places in 1984, as the Old Allegheny Rows Historic District. As the petition nominating the district for National Register status explained, these rowhouses, while intended for industrial workers of modest means, were designed to be beautiful and to offer the workers some amenities: "The various styles and designs of row houses in the proposed Old Allegheny Rows Historic District represent the local evolution of row housing between 1870-1900. The growth of industry and manufacturing, advances and improvements in transportation, and a growing urban working class, increased the demand for housing in what had been a remote corner of the City of Allegheny. This era saw a change in the nature and appearance of city dwellings in the district from simple brick boxes intended to house the workers of a particular local industry, to an ornate polychromed speculative development with modern conveniences designed to appeal to the independent urban wage earner."

The neighborhood began to depopulate after the Great Depression. The neighborhood's demographics also shifted after 1960: the African-American population increased from 3% of the neighborhood in 1960 to roughly 33% in 1970, and then to 80% in 2000.

Since 1970, a significant portion of the neighborhood's building stock has been owned by absentee landlords who often rent to subsidized tenants through Section 8 and similar programs. Critics of these landlords allege that they listed the neighborhood as a historic district as a ruse to obtain federal funding to buy and rent the properties, while at the same time neglecting upkeep and eventually demolishing some of these neglected structures. The landlords dispute these criticisms and claim that they are working actively to improve the neighborhood.

Over time, some of the neighborhood's structures have been demolished, so that there are now (in 2011) significant gaps in the rows of houses, which are now vacant lots. Some current residents see these changes as improvements which will encourage new residents to maintain and preserve the remaining structures.

== City Steps ==
The California-Kirkbride neighborhood has 9 distinct flights of city steps - many of which are open and in a safe condition. In California-Kirkbride, the public stairways in Pittsburgh quickly connect pedestrians to public transportation and provide an easy way to travel through the neighborhood.

== Surrounding Pittsburgh neighborhoods ==
California-Kirkbride has four borders with the Pittsburgh neighborhoods of Perry South from the north to the east, Central North Side from the east to the south, Manchester to the west, and Marshall-Shadeland to the northwest.

== See also ==
- List of Pittsburgh neighborhoods
