= Summer Hill (Pittsburgh) =

- Neighborhood of Pittsburgh
- Coordinates: 40.493°N 80.008°W
- Country: United States
- State: Pennsylvania
- County: Allegheny County
- City: Pittsburgh

Area
  - Total: 0.439 sq mi (1.14 km^{2})

Population (2010)
  - Total: 1,051
  - Density: 2,390/sq mi (924/km^{2})

Summer Hill is a neighborhood located in the North Side region of Pittsburgh, Pennsylvania. It has a zip code of 15214, and has representation on Pittsburgh City Council by the council member for District 1 (North Neighborhoods).

Once part of Reserve Township, the Summer Hill area was annexed to Pittsburgh's North Side on October 31, 1922. It was a sparsely populated site until the late 1960s, when Pittsburgh's Urban Redevelopment Authority proposed, and City Council approved, construction of a 51-acre development called "Harpen Hilltop," which consisted of 373 private homes and a 272-unit high-rise for elderly residents of the East Street Valley whose homes were being torn down to permit construction of I-279.

Maps in the City of Pittsburgh Department of Urban Planning's 1974 "Neighborhood Profiles" series refer to the area as "Harpen Hilltop." However, just three years later, a similar Neighborhood Atlas series called the area Summer Hill and referred to an adjacent Ivory Avenue district.

The area comprising the Ivory Avenue district and the Harpen Hilltop development has been known as Summer Hill since the 1970s. The population has been steady since 2000 at roughly 1,000 people.

== Surrounding neighborhoods and communities ==
Summer Hill has four borders including the Pittsburgh neighborhoods of Perry North to the west and Northview Heights to the south, as well as the townships of Reserve to the east and Ross to the north.

== See also ==
- List of Pittsburgh neighborhoods
