= Old Allegheny Rows Historic District =

Historic district in Pennsylvania, United States

- U.S. National Register of Historic Places
- U.S. Historic district
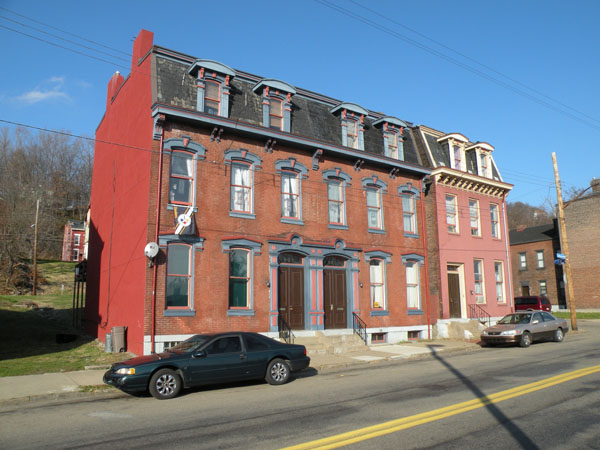
- Near 904 California Avenue in the California-Kirkbride neighborhood of Pittsburgh, Pennsylvania

- Location within Pennsylvania
- Location: Roughly bounded by Sedgwick, California, Marquis, Mero, Brighton, and Morrison Streets (California-Kirkbride), Pittsburgh, Pennsylvania, USA
- Coordinates: 40°27′34.06″N 80°1′8.52″W
- Architect: Herbert DuPuy
- Architectural style: Romanesque Revival
- NRHP reference No.: 84000349
- Added to NRHP: November 1, 1984

The Old Allegheny Rows Historic District is a historic district in the California-Kirkbride neighborhood of Pittsburgh, Pennsylvania, United States. The row houses in this area date from c. 1870 to c. 1900, and the district was listed on the National Register of Historic Places on November 1, 1984.
