= Marshall-Shadeland =

Marshall-Shadeland Brightwood
- Neighborhood of Pittsburgh
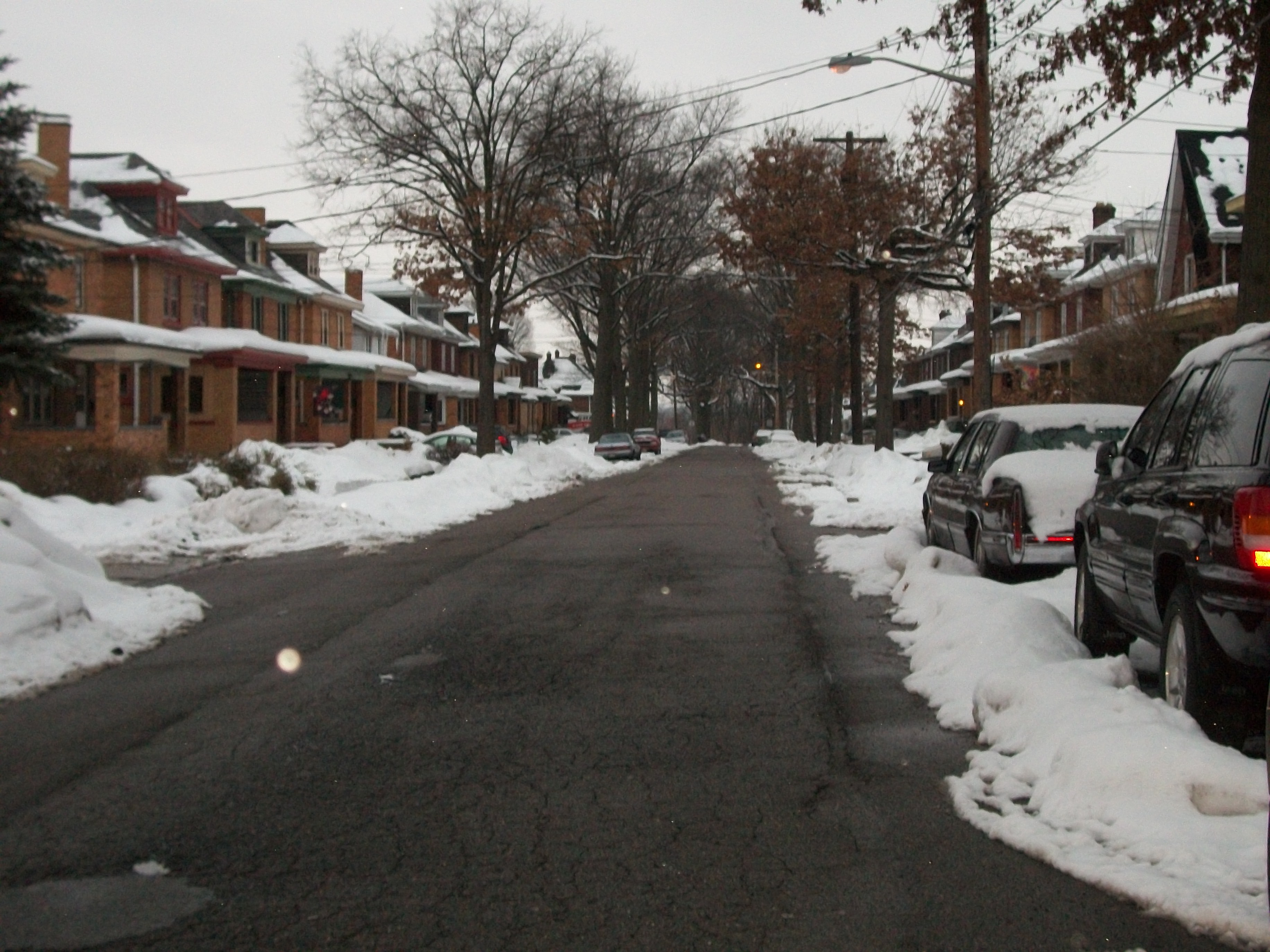
- Large, early 20th-century housing in the southern portion of the neighborhood.

- Coordinates: 40.469°N 80.032°W
- Country: United States
- State: Pennsylvania
- County: Allegheny County
- City: Pittsburgh

Area
  - Total: 1.254 sq mi (3.25 km^{2})

Population (2010)
  - Total: 6,043
  - Density: 4,819/sq mi (1,861/km^{2})

Marshall-Shadeland is a neighborhood on Pittsburgh, Pennsylvania's North Side. It has a zip codes of both 15212 and 15214, and has representation on Pittsburgh City Council by the council member for District 1 (North Neighborhoods).

The neighborhood is a largely residential area that was annexed by Allegheny City in 1870. It is bordered by Woods Run Avenue on the north, Marshall Avenue on the south, and Riverview Park, Highwood Cemetery, and Uniondale Cemetery on the east. The neighborhood technically extends west to the Ohio River, but in practice the residential district ends at California Avenue. The area between California Avenue and the Ohio River is an industrial site and the home of the Woods Run Penitentiary, now known as State Correctional Institution – Pittsburgh.

The neighborhood has been home to a number of different ethnic groups and has been called a number of different names.

It was called "Woods Run" after early settler John Ross, and the neighborhood's library is still the Woods Run branch of the Carnegie Library of Pittsburgh. In an article about the library, reporter Patricia Lowry described the neighborhood by saying that "Woods Run isn't an official city neighborhood, but it has always seemed to me to be one of the most quintessentially Pittsburgh places—a valley village with some neatly kept gardens and frame houses stacked on the hillsides."

It was called "Shadeland-Halls Grove" in a 1974 Neighborhood Profile by the City of Pittsburgh Department of Urban Planning, which drew a distinction between the residential neighborhood and the "Woods Run Industrial district."

It was called "Marshall-Shadeland" in a 1977 Neighborhood Atlas that purported to be part of "a neighborhood information system that more closely reflects neighborhood boundaries as defined by residents instead of by public officials." The Atlas stated that "Marshall-Shadeland was named for Archibald M. Marshall, Irish grocer, dry goods merchant, landscaper of West Park and a partner in the Marshall-Kennedy Milling Company. A residential area, Marshall-Shadeland is predominantly Slovak, with Italians, Carpatho-Rusins, Russians, Irish and Germans also represented."

More recently, residents have been calling the area Brightwood. The City of Pittsburgh's website now (2011) refers to the area as "Marshall-Shadeland (Brightwood)". Area advocates have organized the Brightwood Civic Group.

== Surrounding and adjacent neighborhoods ==
Marshall-Shadeland has six land borders, including the Pittsburgh neighborhoods of Brighton Heights to the north, Perry North to the northeast, Perry South to the east, and California-Kirkbride, Manchester and Chateau to the south. Across the Ohio River to the west, Marshall-Shadeland runs adjacent with Stowe Township, McKees Rocks, and the Pittsburgh neighborhood of Esplen. The McKees Rocks Bridge westbound starts at PA Route 65 in Brighton Heights, then passes over Marshall-Shadeland, the Ohio River, Stowe Township and ends at PA Route 51 in McKees Rocks.

== Transportation ==
Marshall-Shadeland is within the city of Pittsburgh, and is served by the Port Authority of Allegheny County, with a number of bus routes through the neighborhood.

== City steps ==
The Marshall-Shadeland neighborhood has 29 distinct flights of city steps, many of which are open to the public. In Marshall-Shadeland, the public stairways in Pittsburgh quickly connect pedestrians to public transportation and provide an easy way to travel through this hilly, populated area.

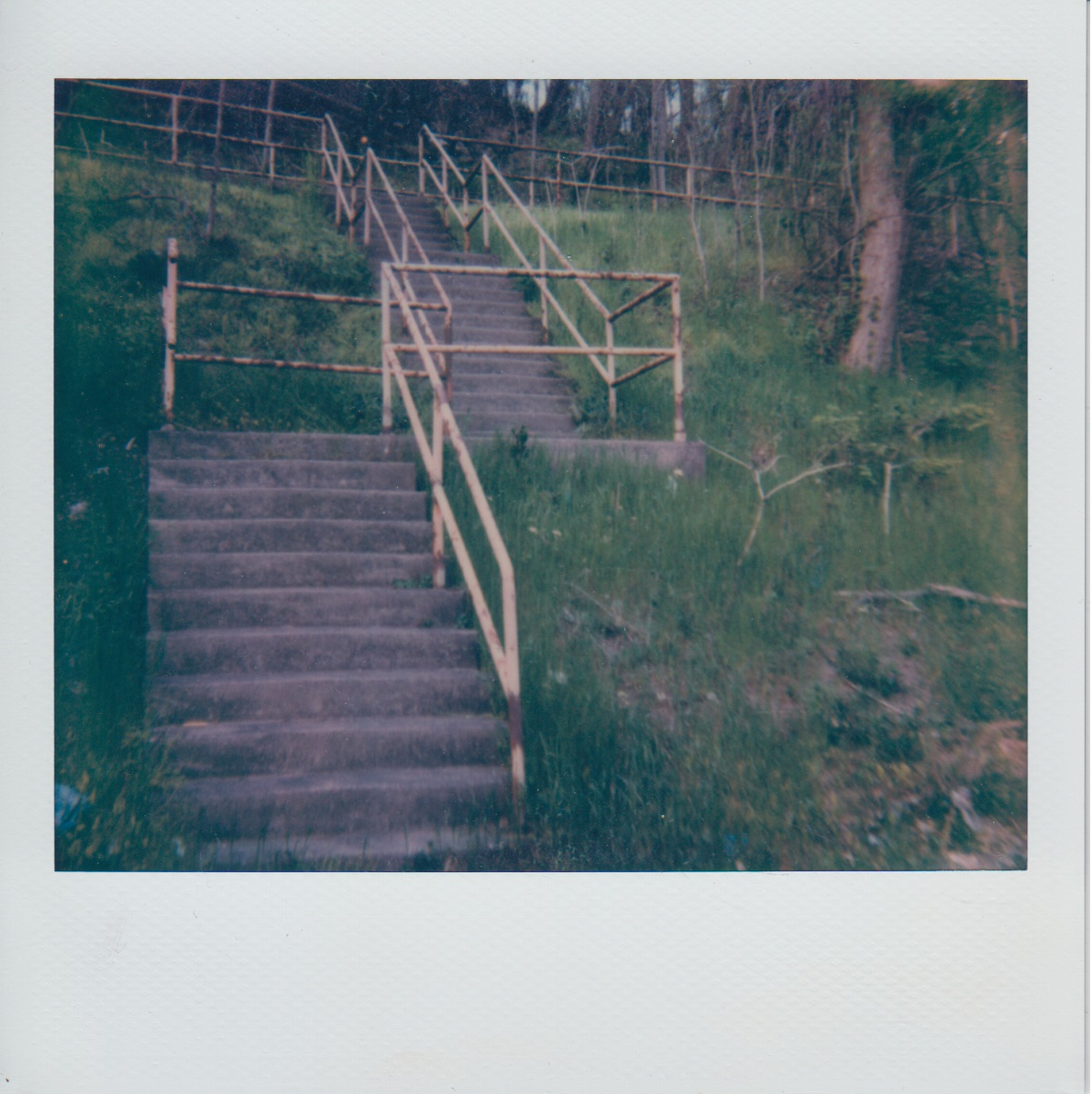
The Atmore Street city steps in Marshall-Shadeland

== See also ==
- Brunot Island
- List of Pittsburgh neighborhoods
