= John Brashear =

American astronomer and instrument builder

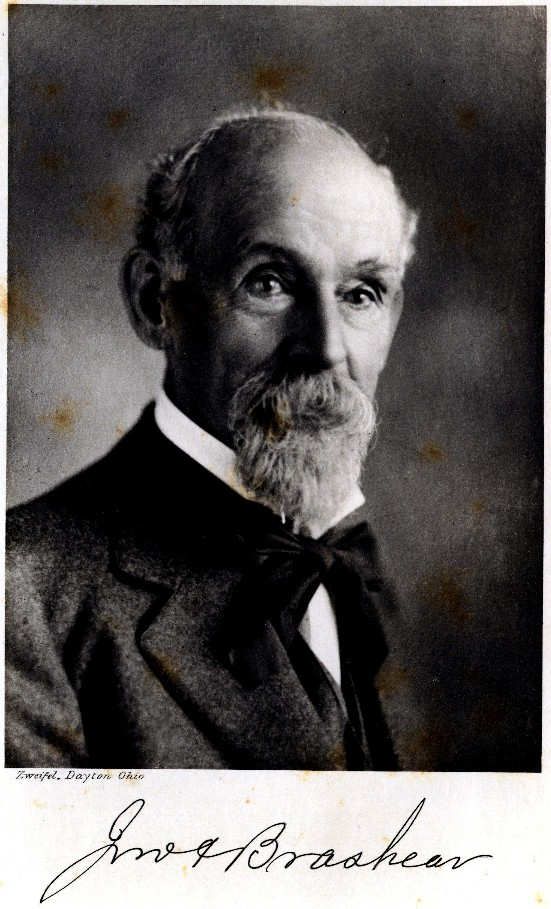
- Born: November 24, 1840; Brownsville, Pennsylvania
- Died: April 8, 1920 (aged 79)
- Organizations: University of Pittsburgh
- Awards: Elliott Cresson Medal (1910)

John Alfred Brashear (November 24, 1840 – April 8, 1920) was an American astronomer and instrument builder.

== Life and work ==
Brashear was born in Brownsville, Pennsylvania, a town located 35 miles (56 km) south of Pittsburgh along the Monongahela River. His father, Basil Brown Brashear, worked as a saddler, while his mother, Julia Smith Brashear, was a school teacher. He was the oldest of seven children. As a young boy, John Brashear was profoundly influenced by his maternal grandfather, Nathanial Smith, who was a clock repairer. At the age of nine, his grandfather took him to peer through the telescope of 'Squire' Joseph P. Wampler, who often set up his traveling telescope in Brownsville. This formative experience of viewing the moon and the planet Saturn stayed with Brashear throughout his life. After receiving a common school education until the age of 15, he began an apprenticeship with a machinist and had mastered his trade by the age of 20.

Beginning in 1861, Brashear worked as a millwright in a rolling steel mill in Pittsburgh. He pursued his passion for astronomy during the night, with the assistance of his wife Phoebe Stewart, a Sunday school teacher whom Brashear met in 1861 and married in 1862. With limited financial resources to purchase a telescope, Brashear constructed his own workshop using a three-meter-square coal shed behind his house. He then proceeded to build his own refractor.

John Brashear

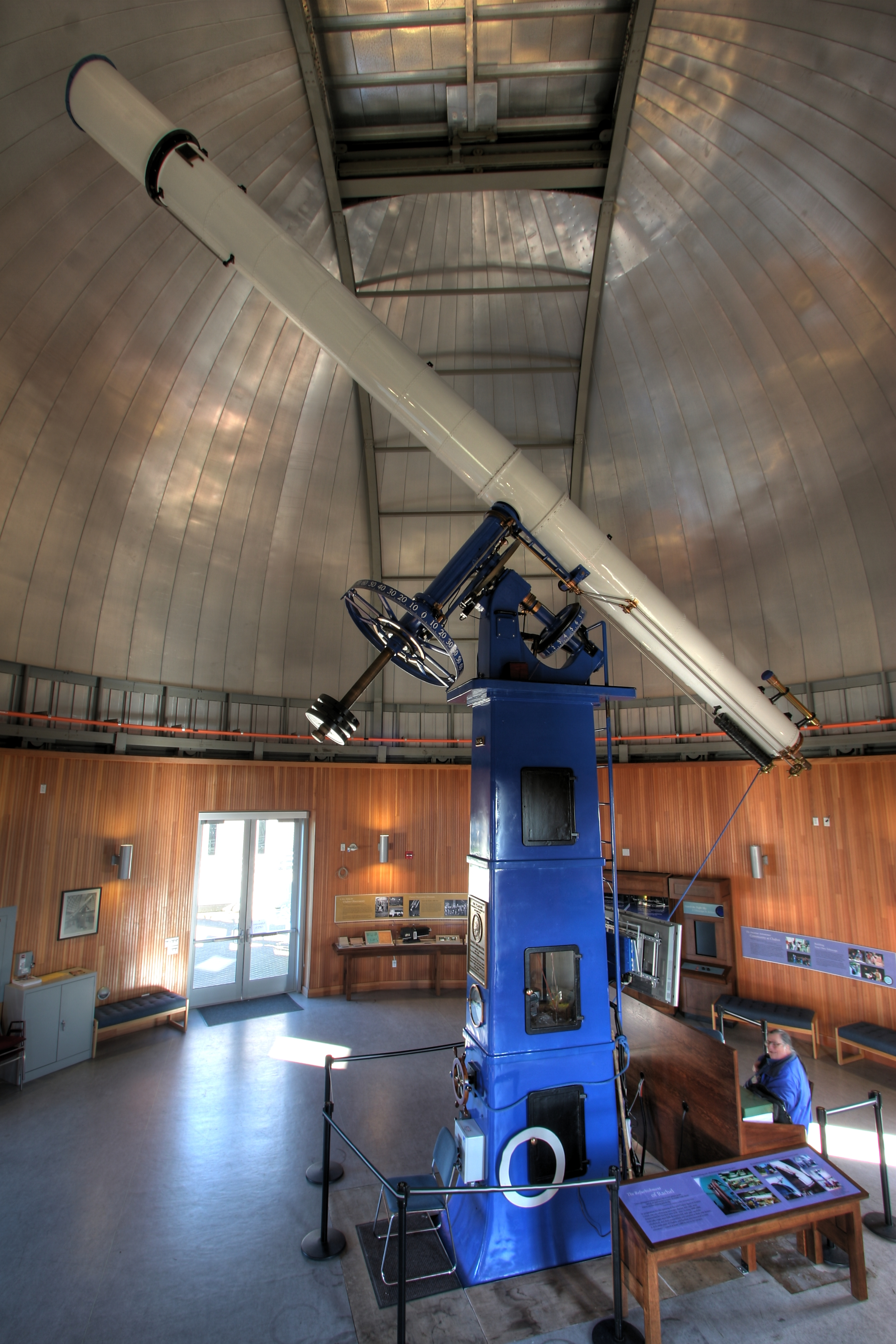
20" telescope

Starting in 1880, Brashear dedicated his time to manufacturing astronomical as well as scientific instruments and conducting various experiments. He notably developed an improved silvering method, which would later become the standard for coating first surface mirrors, known as the "Brashear Process," until vacuum metalizing began replacing it in 1932.

Brashear patented few instruments and never patented his techniques. He founded "John A. Brashear Co." with his son-in-law and partner, James Brown McDowell (now a division of L-3 Communications, and still based in Pittsburgh). His instruments gained worldwide respect. Optical elements and instruments of precision produced by John Brashear were purchased for their quality by almost every important observatory in the world. Some are still in use today. A crew demolishing his factory found a time capsule that became an object of dispute.

In 1892 Brashear made his second of three trips to Europe, this time providing a lecture tour. In 1898 he became director of the Allegheny Observatory in Pittsburgh, continuing in this post until 1900.

From 1901 to 1904, he was acting chancellor of the Western University of Pennsylvania, now known as the University of Pittsburgh, after serving as a member of the board of trustees since 1896. Brashear also was a trustee of the Carnegie Institute of Technology and served as President of the Academy of Science and Art.

John and Phoebe Brashear were active in their church as well. He served as the choir director of Bingham Street Methodist Episcopal Church, and organized the Cantata Society, composed of church choirs from Pittsburgh's South Side. During the Panama-Pacific Exposition (1915), in which a 20" Warner-Swasey telescope with Brashear optics was displayed, Brashear was named "the State's most distinguished man" by Pennsylvania's Governor Martin Grove Brumbaugh. The telescope is still in use today at Chabot Space and Science Center at Oakland, California.

John Brashear was admired and beloved by fellow western Pennsylvanians and international astronomers, who familiarly called him "Uncle John".

In 1919, he suffered ptomaine poisoning (an outdated term for food poisoning), which induced a debilitating illness lasting six months. He died at age 79 at his home on Perrysville Avenue. His body was held in state in the Great Hall of the Soldiers and Sailors Monument.

His ashes are interred in a crypt below the Keeler Telescope at Allegheny Observatory, along with those of his wife. A plaque on the crypt reads: "We have loved the stars too fondly to be fearful of the night.", a paraphrase of the last line of the poem "The Old Astronomer to His Pupil" by Sarah Williams. He was survived by a daughter and several siblings.

== Honors ==
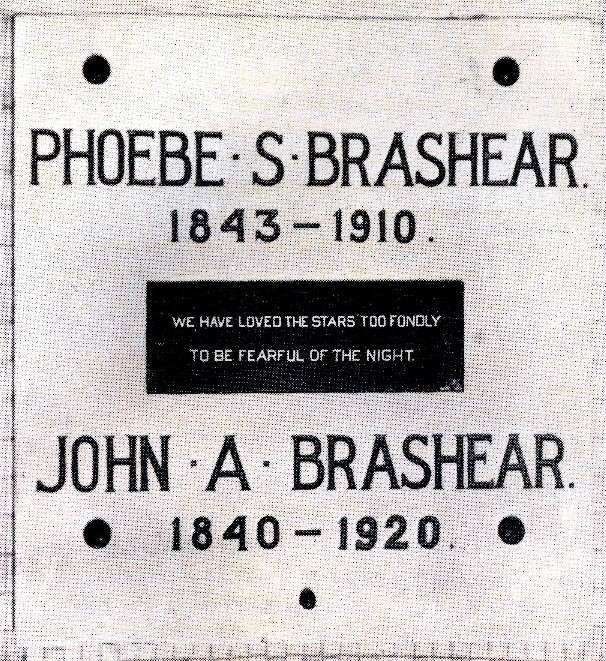
Plaque in the crypt of the Allegheny Observatory

- In 1902, he was elected as a member of the American Philosophical Society.
- He was awarded the Elliott Cresson Medal of The Franklin Institute in 1910.
- The Brashear Association was founded in 1916 in his memory.
- In 2012, the John A. Brashear House and Factory at 1954 Perrysville Avenue in the Perry South neighborhood of Pittsburgh was listed on the National Register of Historic Places.

Named for him:

- The crater Brashear on the Moon
- The crater Brashear on Mars
- Asteroid 5502 Brashear
- Brashear High School in Pittsburgh, Pennsylvania (1976)
- Brashear Street in Pittsburgh, Pennsylvania
- One of the telescopes at the Goodsell Observatory
- The Brashear 11-Inch Refractor at the Nicholas E. Wagman Observatory near Pittsburgh.

== See also ==
- List of astronomical instrument makers
- Chabot Space & Science Center, Oakland, California
