= Spring Garden (Pittsburgh) =

Neighborhood in Pennsylvania, US

- Neighborhood of Pittsburgh
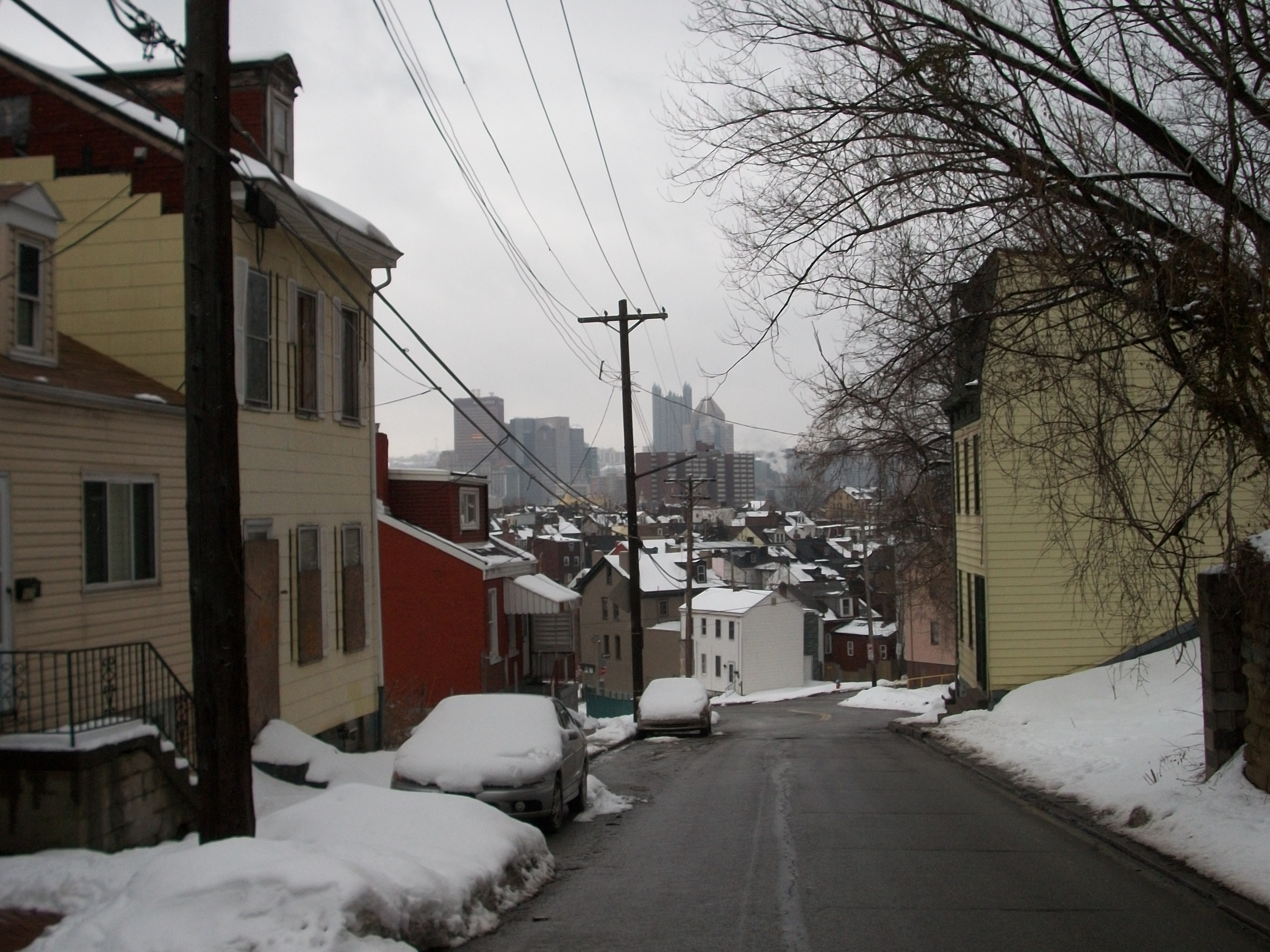
- Row houses on hilly Itin Street afford a powerful view of the skyline.

- Coordinates: 40.471°N 79.988°W
- Country: United States
- State: Pennsylvania
- County: Allegheny County
- City: Pittsburgh

Area
  - Total: 0.275 sq mi (0.71 km^{2})

Population (2010)
  - Total: 884
  - Density: 3,210/sq mi (1,240/km^{2})

Spring Garden is a small neighborhood on Pittsburgh, Pennsylvania's North Side. It takes its name from Spring Garden Avenue, which follows the floor of the valley that separates the two adjacent hilltop neighborhoods of Spring Hill and Troy Hill. Like those neighborhoods, Spring Garden was initially settled by the descendants of Germans and Austrians who had emigrated from Europe to East Allegheny in Allegheny City. These initial residents of Spring Garden worked in slaughterhouses, rendering factories, and tanneries located in this valley neighborhood.

A 1974 report by Pittsburgh's Department of Urban Planning explained that "Historically, this neighborhood because of its location and convenience for industrial expansion out of the valley floor from the East North Side, has been of mixed industrial and residential uses. Today, the industrial uses are becoming marginal due to the age and lack of room to expand. This has left mostly row type residential uses to survive along the narrow streets on the valley floor and hillsides."

Between 1974 and 2010, the neighborhood's population changed in several respects. In 1974 the neighborhood housed about 2,000 people and about 5% of the houses were vacant. In 2010, the neighborhood's population had declined to about 800 people and about 25% of the houses were vacant.

Historical population
Year	Pop.	±%
1940	4,357	—
1950	3,962	−9.1%
1960	3,426	−13.5%
1970	3,151	−8.0%
1980	2,134	−32.3%
1990	1,753	−17.9%
2000	1,254	−28.5%
2010	884	−29.5%
Source: University of Pittsburgh

== History ==
Until 1959 the neighbourhood was served by the 1 Spring Garden trolley operated by Pittsburgh Railways.

== Surrounding neighborhoods ==
Spring Garden has four borders including the Pittsburgh neighborhoods of Troy Hill to the south and southeast, East Allegheny to the southwest, and Spring Hill to the west as well as Reserve Township to the north, east and northwest.

== See also ==
- List of Pittsburgh neighborhoods
