= Spring Hill–City View =

Spring Hill Spring Hill–City View
- Neighborhood of Pittsburgh
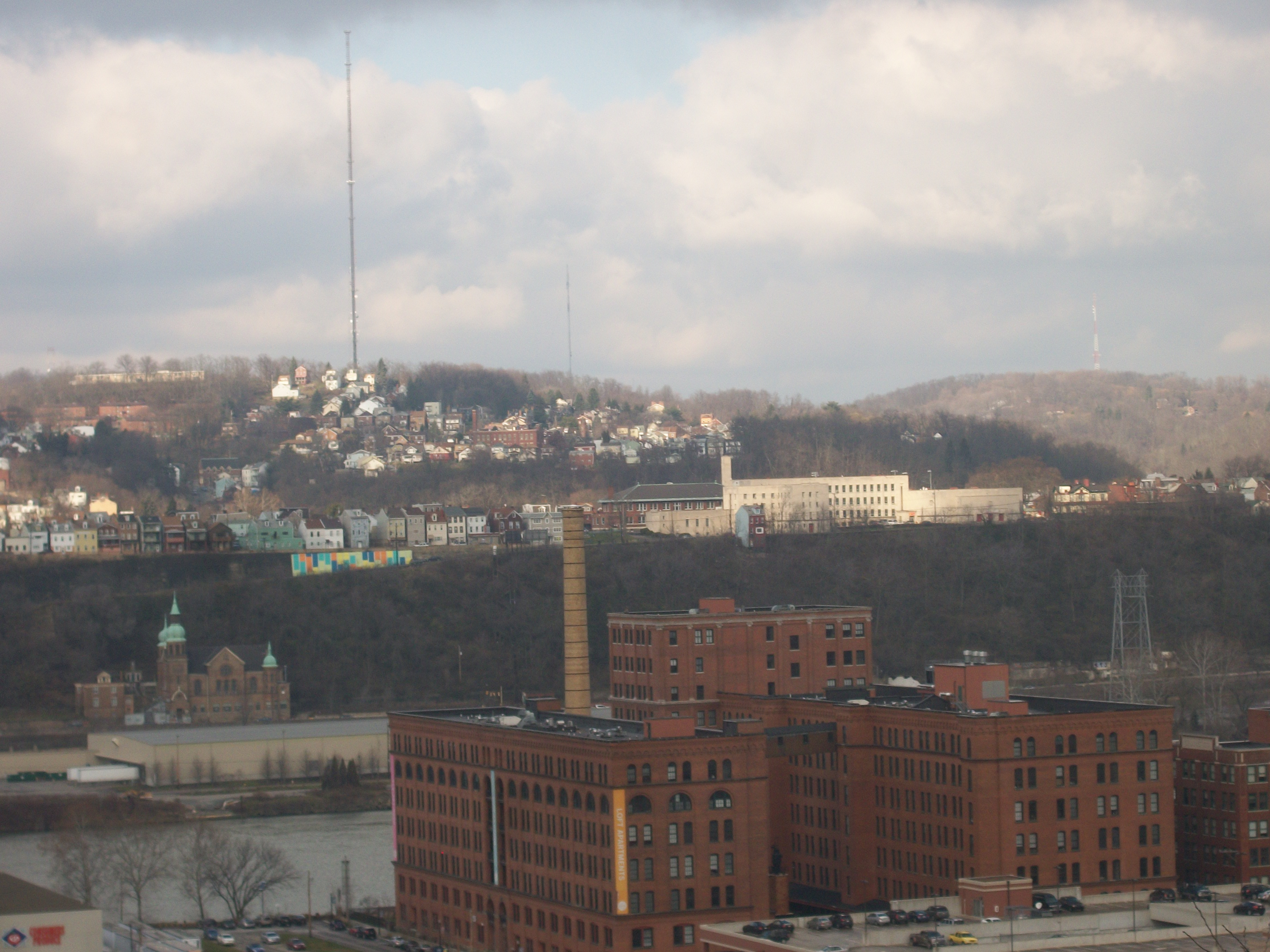
- Spring Hill (background, with radio mast), as seen from Frank Curto Park. The Cork Factory lofts in the Strip District and Troy Hill are located in the foreground.

- Coordinates: 40.467°N 79.994°W
- Country: United States
- State: Pennsylvania
- County: Allegheny County
- City: Pittsburgh

Area
  - Total: 0.63 sq mi (1.6 km^{2})

Population (2010)
  - Total: 2,648
  - Density: 4,200/sq mi (1,600/km^{2})

Spring Hill is a neighborhood on Pittsburgh, Pennsylvania's North Side. Spring Hill was named for the abundance of springs near the site. According to a 1977 Neighborhood Atlas, "Germans immigrated there from 1850 to 1920, giving the neighborhood a Bavarian atmosphere. Local street names include Rhine, Woessner, Haslage, Zoller and Goehring. In 1959 ACTION-Housing opened Spring Hill Gardens, a moderate rent, racially integrated, 209-unit apartment project at Buente and Rhine Streets. Spring Hill Gardens was Pittsburgh's first multi-family housing project backed by the Federal Housing Authority."

The neighborhood's population has changed over time. A 1974 report stated that the neighborhood held 8,000 people around 1970 which included nearby Spring Garden. The Spring Hill neighborhood (excluding Spring Garden) declined to 4,900 in 1974 and then to 2,900 in 2010.

Neighborhood residents have been active for decades through the Spring Hill Civic League, which was first organized to oppose the public housing project in nearby Northview Heights and has remained active ever since. This activism has helped the neighborhood to become one of the safest in all of Pittsburgh.

Historical population
Year	Pop.	±%
1940	7,833	—
1950	7,178	−8.4%
1960	6,389	−11.0%
1970	5,275	−17.4%
1980	3,803	−27.9%
1990	3,288	−13.5%
2000	3,040	−7.5%
2010	2,648	−12.9%
Source: University of Pittsburgh

== Surrounding neighborhoods ==
Spring Hill–City View has six borders, five with the Pittsburgh neighborhoods of Spring Garden to the east, northeast and south, East Allegheny to the southwest, Fineview and Perry Hilltop to the west, and Northview Heights to the northeast. The other border is with Reserve Township to the north.

== See also ==
- List of Pittsburgh neighborhoods
