= Northview Heights =

- Neighborhood of Pittsburgh
- Coordinates: 40.477°N 80.002°W
- Country: United States
- State: Pennsylvania
- County: Allegheny County
- City: Pittsburgh

Area
  - Total: 0.313 sq mi (0.81 km^{2})

Population (2010)
  - Total: 1,214
  - Density: 3,880/sq mi (1,500/km^{2})

Northview Heights is a neighborhood in the North Side of the city of Pittsburgh, Pennsylvania, USA. It has a zip codes of both 15212 and 15214, and has representation on Pittsburgh City Council by the council member for District 1 (North Neighborhoods).

Northview Heights was part of Reserve Township before being annexed by Pittsburgh in 1932. At that time, what is now Northview Heights consisted of vacant land which, due to topography, was isolated from Spring Hill (to the south) and Summer Hill (to the north).

During a seven-year period from 1955 to 1962, the Housing Authority of the City of Pittsburgh developed this vacant land by creating a 999 unit public housing project called Northview Heights. Court action taken by nearby residents opposed to its construction held up the project for three years. Because the housing project was isolated from the surrounding neighborhoods, it has since been treated as a neighborhood in its own right, called Northview Heights. The neighborhood had its own elementary school, Northview Heights Elementary School.

The neighborhood's status as an isolated public housing development has been a source of controversy from its outset. In 1968, just three years after the development was opened, a group of teenagers attacked a policeman and later burglarized his home. Residents who had been living in the project since it opened blamed new residents who had moved in recently, and who had not been screened by the Housing Authority, for the violence. In 1985, the Pittsburgh Public Schools considered integrating the neighborhood's school by busing in children from other neighborhoods but dropped this plan for fear of opposition from the parents of those children. In 1993, firefighters and utility personnel refused to enter the neighborhood without police protection for fear of assault. In 1998, the City of Pittsburgh — over the objections of Northview Heights residents — closed three of the development's five entrances and installed security stations at the remaining two entrances. Studies had shown that while Northview Heights residents owned 125 cars total, some 3,000 cars a day were entering and leaving the development, suggesting that the development was used as a drug market.

As of 2010, Northview Heights had a population of some 1,200 people, of whom 90.5% were African-American. The neighborhood had 723 housing units, of which 63.6% were occupied and 36.4% were vacant. Nearly all (96.3%) of the occupied units were rental housing.

Historical population
Year	Pop.	±%
1940	662	—
1950	727	+9.8%
1960	527	−27.5%
1970	4,561	+765.5%
1980	3,217	−29.5%
1990	2,746	−14.6%
2000	2,526	−8.0%
2010	1,214	−51.9%
Source: University of Pittsburgh

The Pittsburgh Bureau of Fire houses 38 Engine in Northview Heights.

== Surrounding neighborhoods ==
Northview Heights has five borders, four with the Pittsburgh neighborhoods of Spring Hill–City View to the south, Perry South and Perry North to the west, and Summer Hill to the north. The other border is with Reserve Township from the northeast to the southeast.

== See also ==
- List of Pittsburgh neighborhoods
