= Perry South =

Perry South Perry Hilltop
- Neighborhood of Pittsburgh
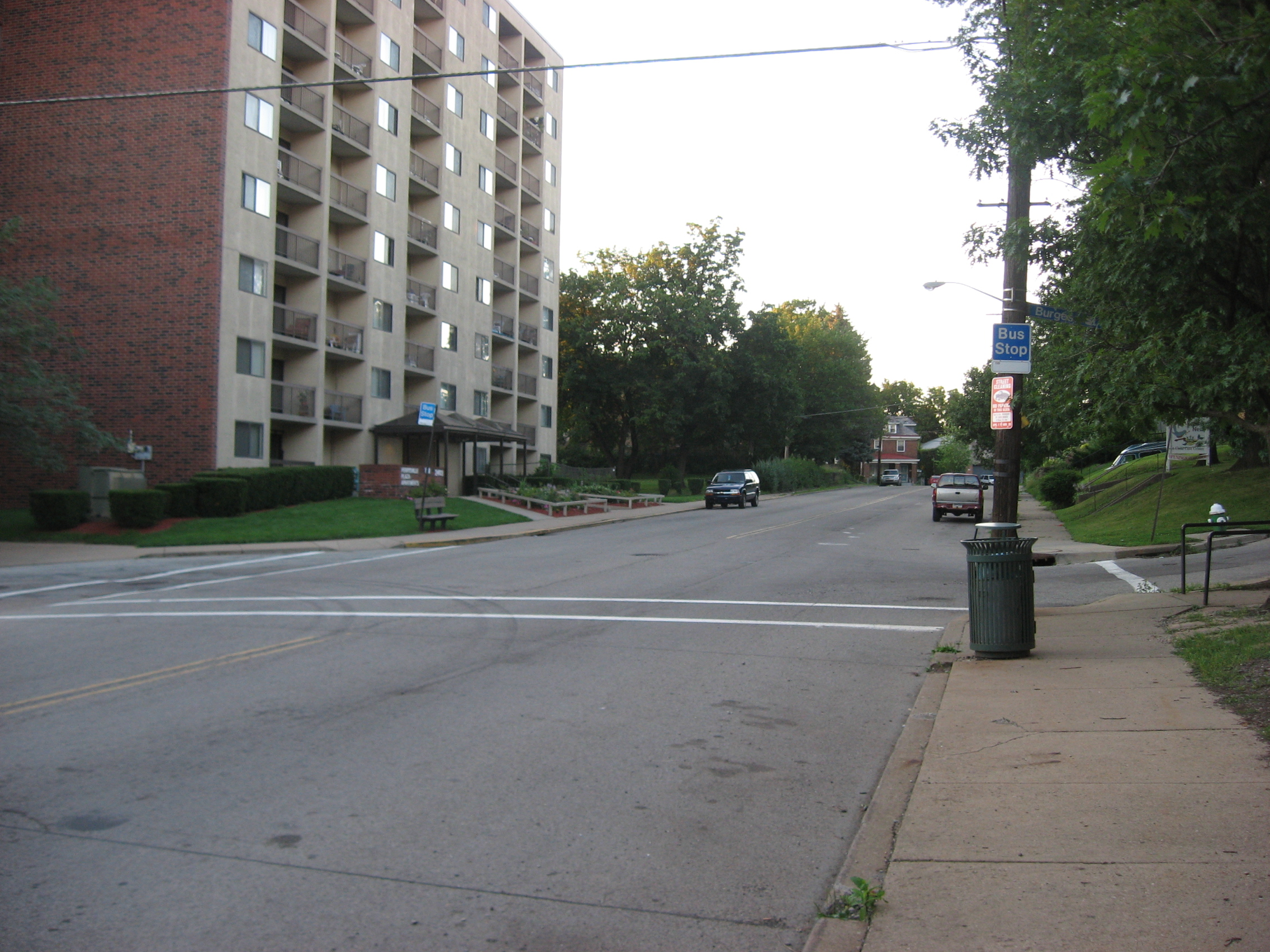
- Along Perrysville Avenue in Perry South

- Coordinates: 40.468°N 80.015°W
- Country: United States
- State: Pennsylvania
- County: Allegheny County
- City: Pittsburgh

Area
  - Total: 0.905 sq mi (2.34 km^{2})

Population (2010)
  - Total: 4,145
  - Density: 4,580/sq mi (1,770/km^{2})

Perry South—also known as Perry Hilltop—is a neighborhood on Pittsburgh, Pennsylvania's North Side. It developed as a streetcar suburb around the turn of the 20th century, so it consists almost exclusively of residential housing, with a small business district at the intersection of Perrysville Avenue and Charles Avenue. The hill on which the neighborhood is built provides natural borders to the west (the Charles Street Valley), to the east (Parkway North) and to the south (the Mexican War Streets).

Perry South has representation on Pittsburgh City Council by the council member for District 6. It is within Pittsburgh's 26th ward.

The section of Perry South surrounding Charles Street was once called Pleasant Valley and considered a neighborhood in its own right. The area is now known as the Charles Street Valley.

== History ==
The neighborhood takes its name from Perrysville Avenue, which was itself named for Commodore Oliver Hazard Perry, who supposedly used a Native American trail to transport supplies during the War of 1812. Perrysville Avenue is an extension of Federal Street, the main north-south thoroughfare of the city formerly known as Allegheny. It was previously a toll road known as the Perrysville Plank Road. Federal Street ends and Perrysville Avenue begins where the flat river plain gives way to a steep hill.

A 1977 report about Pleasant Valley states that "Pleasant Valley was formerly known as Snyder's Hollow and its stream was a favorite ice skating spot. Primarily, the neighborhood was settled by Germans, Irish, Italians and Poles. Josh Gibson, Hall of Fame catcher for the Homestead Grays, a Negro National League team of the 1920s, lived there." The Charles Street Valley features rowhouses built by the owners of the Federal Street & Pleasant Valley Railway Co., which operated the streetcars that facilitated residential development in Perry South. A series of these rowhouses on Brightridge Street have been listed on the National Register of Historic Places.

Perry South experienced white flight after 1960; from 1960 to 1970, the neighborhood's total population declined from 16,000 people to 13,000, while its African-American population, which had formerly been located almost exclusively in the Charles Street Valley, increased from 15% to 20%. From 1970 to 2000, the total population decreased to just 5,200 people, of whom 65% were African-American.

For more than six decades, the Perry Hilltop Citizens Council has sought to improve housing conditions, advocate for residents, and to improve the neighborhood's business district.

== Surrounding Pittsburgh neighborhoods ==
Perry South has seven borders with the Pittsburgh neighborhoods of Perry North to the north, Northview Heights to the northeast, Spring Hill-City View to the east, Fineview to the southeast, Central North Side to the south, California-Kirkbride to the southwest, and Marshall-Shadeland to the west and north-northwest.

== Notable people ==
Notable individuals who were born in or lived in Perry South include:

- Dorothy Mae Richardson (1922-1991), American community activist
- Josh Gibson (1911-1947), American baseball player
- John Brashear (1840-1920), American astronomer

== In popular culture ==
- In the 1999 film Dogma, St. Luke's Memorial Lutheran Church at 2235 Federal St. Ext. stands in for a church in Mchenry, Illinois.

== Gallery ==
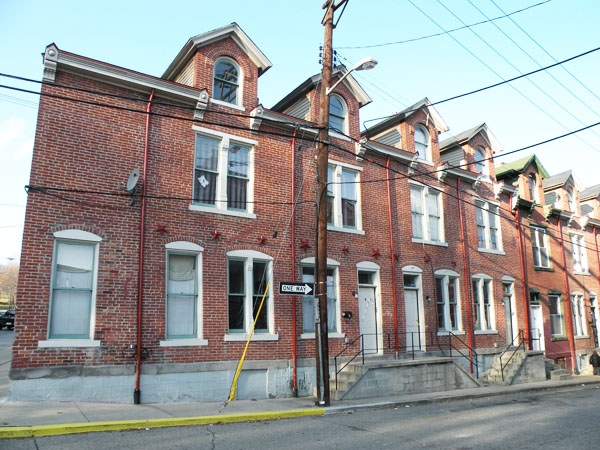
Houses at 838–862 Brightridge Street, built in 1887

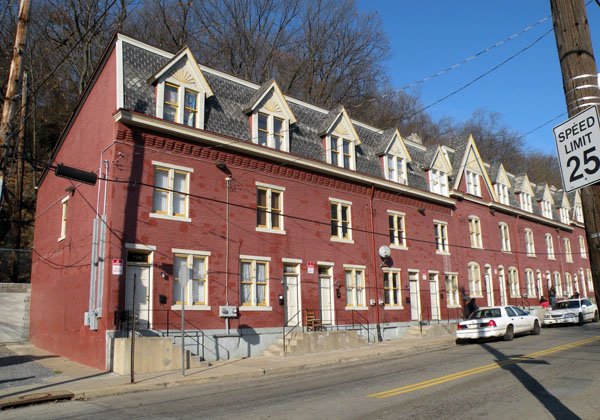
Houses at 2501–2531 Charles Street, built in 1885
