= Perry North =

Perry North Observatory Hill
- Neighborhood of Pittsburgh
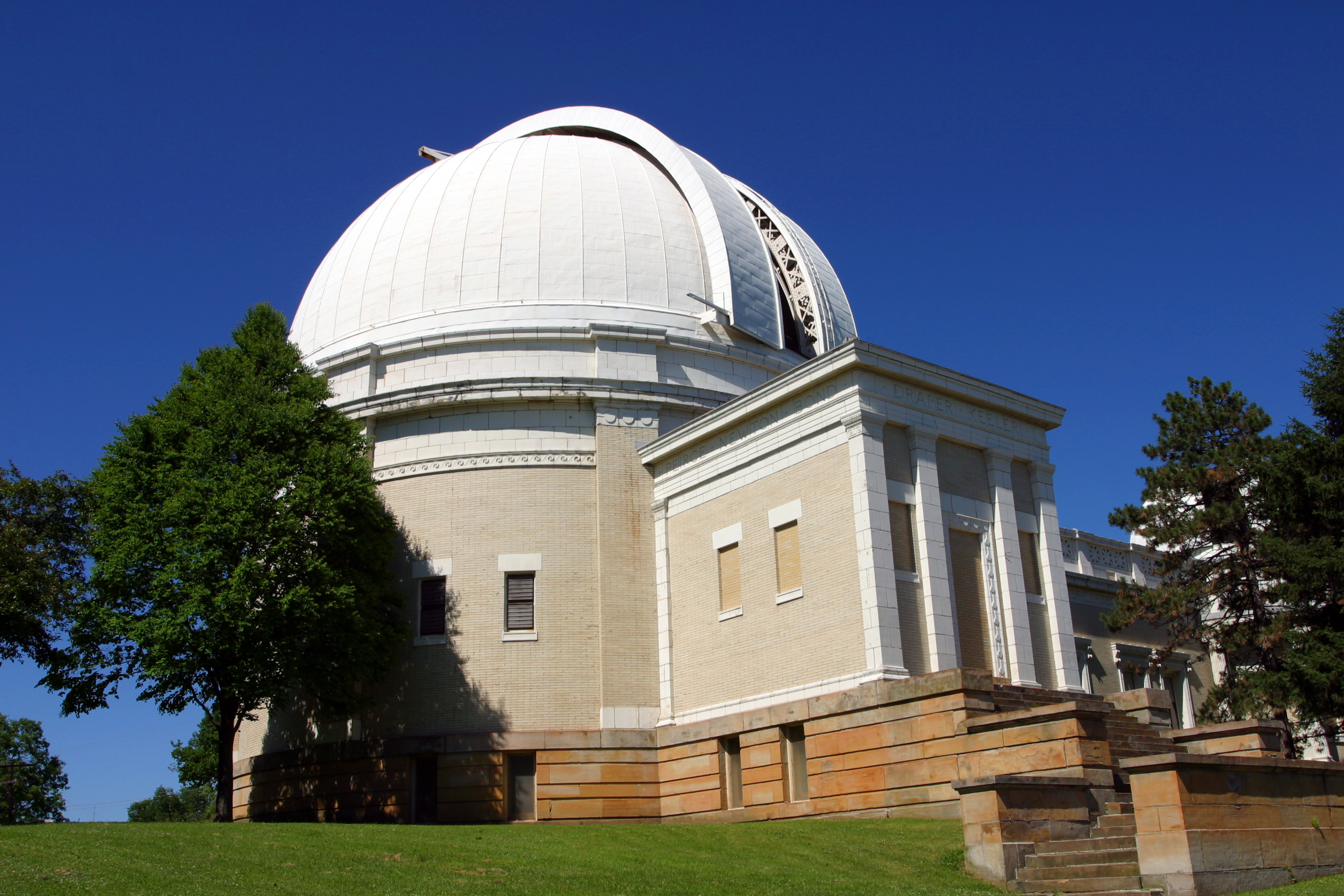
- The Allegheny Observatory at the top of Observatory Hill.

- Coordinates: 40.487°N 80.017°W
- Country: United States
- State: Pennsylvania
- County: Allegheny County
- City: Pittsburgh

Area
  - Total: 1.212 sq mi (3.14 km^{2})

Population (2010)
  - Total: 4,050
  - Density: 3,340/sq mi (1,290/km^{2})

Perry North (also known as Observatory Hill) is a neighborhood in the north of Pittsburgh, Pennsylvania, United States. It lies within zip codes 15212 and 15214, and has representation on Pittsburgh City Council by the council member for District 1 (North Neighborhoods). The highest elevation in Pittsburgh is 1,370 feet at the Brashear Reservoir at the top of Observatory Hill. The Pittsburgh Bureau of fire houses 34 Engine in Perry North.

Observatory Hill was originally part of Allegheny City. Since Allegheny City's annexation to the city of Pittsburgh in 1907, the Observatory Hill district has expanded and is home to nearly 14,000 residents. The neighborhood has stately homes, a business district, Riverview Park, and the Allegheny Observatory. It is also home to the Byzantine Catholic Seminary of SS. Cyril and Methodius.

== City Steps ==
The Perry North neighborhood has 21 distinct flights of city steps - many of which are open and in a safe condition. In Perry North, the public stairways in Pittsburgh quickly connect pedestrians to public transportation, main business corridors, and schools, and provide an easy way to travel through this hilly area.

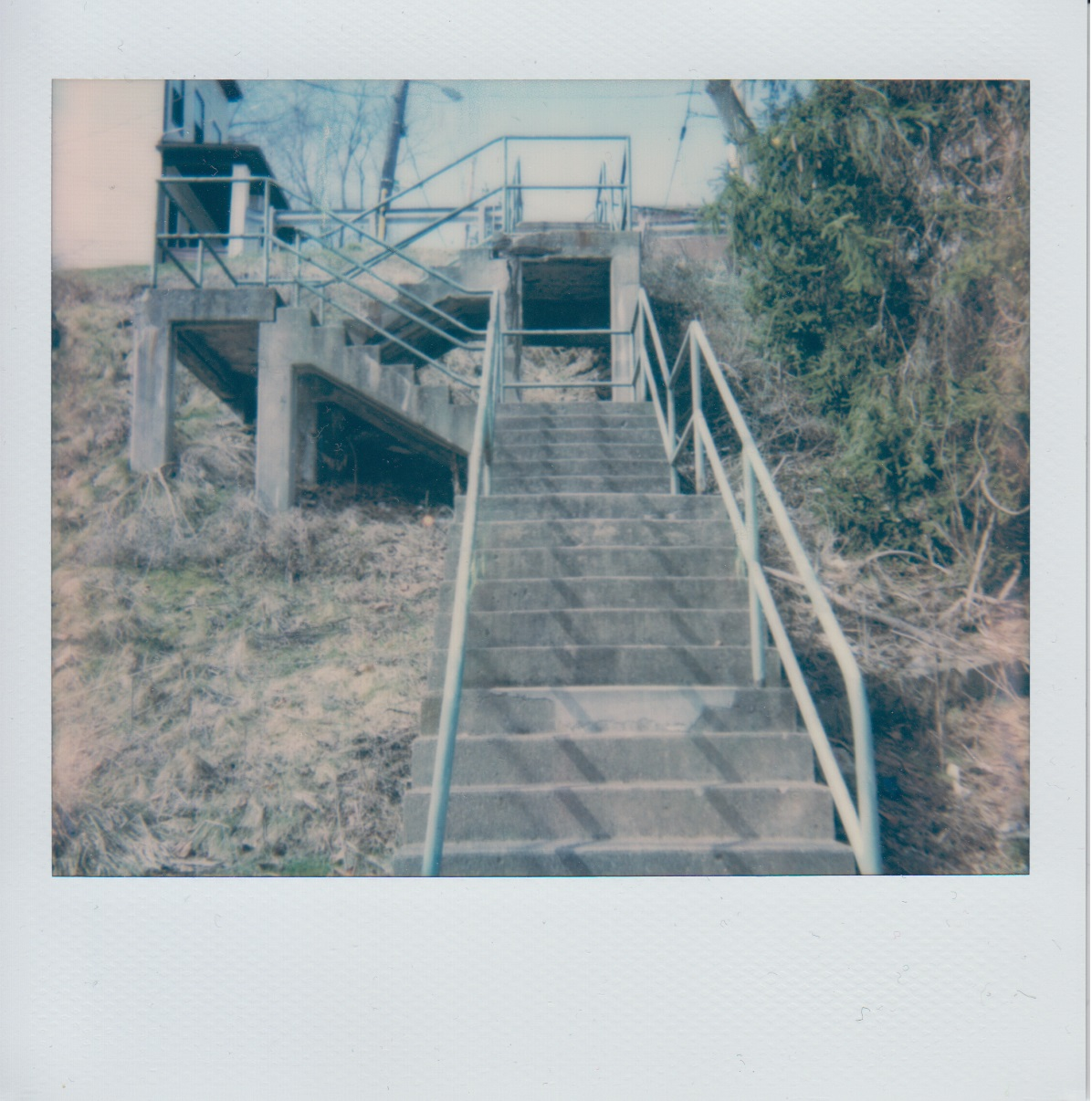
The Milroy Street city steps in Perry North

== Surrounding neighborhoods ==
Perry North has six borders, five with the Pittsburgh neighborhoods of Brighton Heights to the west, Summer Hill to the east and northeast, Northview Heights to the southeast, Perry South to the south, and Marshall-Shadeland to the southwest. The other border is with Ross Township to the north.

== See also ==
List of Pittsburgh neighborhoods
