= Riverview Park (Pittsburgh) =

Municipal park in Pittsburgh, Pennsylvania

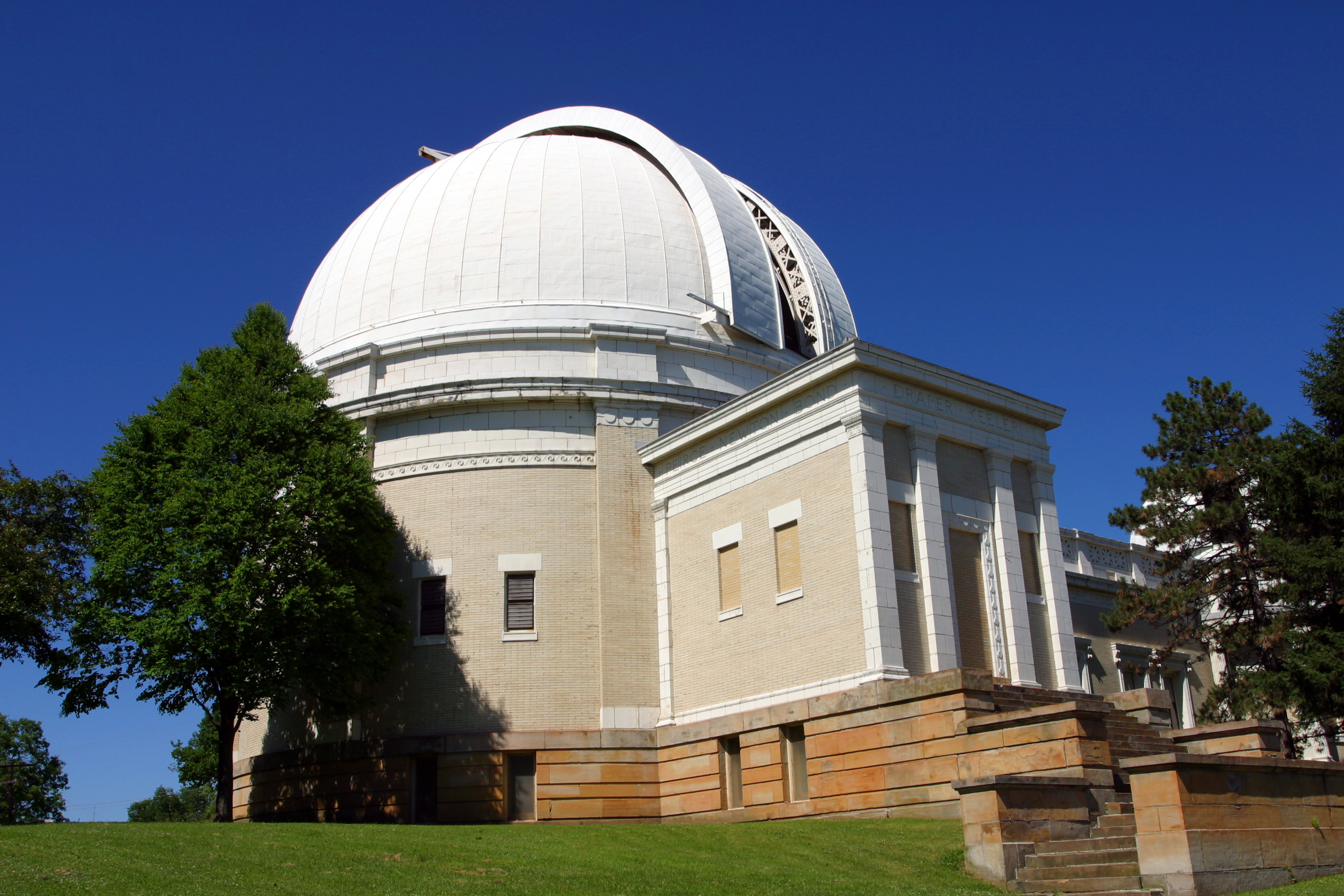
- Allegheny Observatory, at the top of Riverview Park
- Interactive map of Riverview Park
- Type: Municipal Park
- Location: Perry North, Pittsburgh, Pennsylvania
- Coordinates: 40.481247°N 80.019558°W
- Area: 251 acres (102 ha)
- Created: 1894
- Operator: City of Pittsburgh Parks & Recreation (CitiParks), Department of Public Works
- Website: Official website

Riverview Park is the fourth largest municipal park in Pittsburgh, Pennsylvania. The park is located four miles (6 km) north of Downtown in the neighborhood of Perry North and consists of 251 acres (1.02 km^{2}).

== Area ==
Riverview Park appears to be the first park in the city of Allegheny, Pennsylvania, (which since 1907 is a part of the city of Pittsburgh). Allegheny City created it in response to the City of Pittsburgh's creation of Schenley Park. The land the Riverview Park occupies belonged to Sam Watson and was known as Watson's Farm. Mayor William M. Kennedy and the residents of Allegheny City pooled their money and purchased Watson's farm in 1894 and then donated the land to the City of Allegheny.

== Changes over time ==
When the park first opened, it had "meadows and grassy hills" as compared to the somewhat unmanaged landscape that park visitors enjoy today. The park also had a small zoo, an elk paddock, a bear pit, a merry-go round, and an amphitheatre. Today many of these structures are gone, but a stroll into some of the now undeveloped areas of the park may have you find some of these mementos of the past. The park now has a public pool, a playground, the only equestrian (bridle) path in the City Park system, various shelters, the Allegheny Observatory, and summertime concerts and movies.

The park was listed on the National Register of Historic Places in 2021.

== Images ==
- Riverview Park Map
