= Allegheny Observatory =

Research institution in Pennsylvania, US

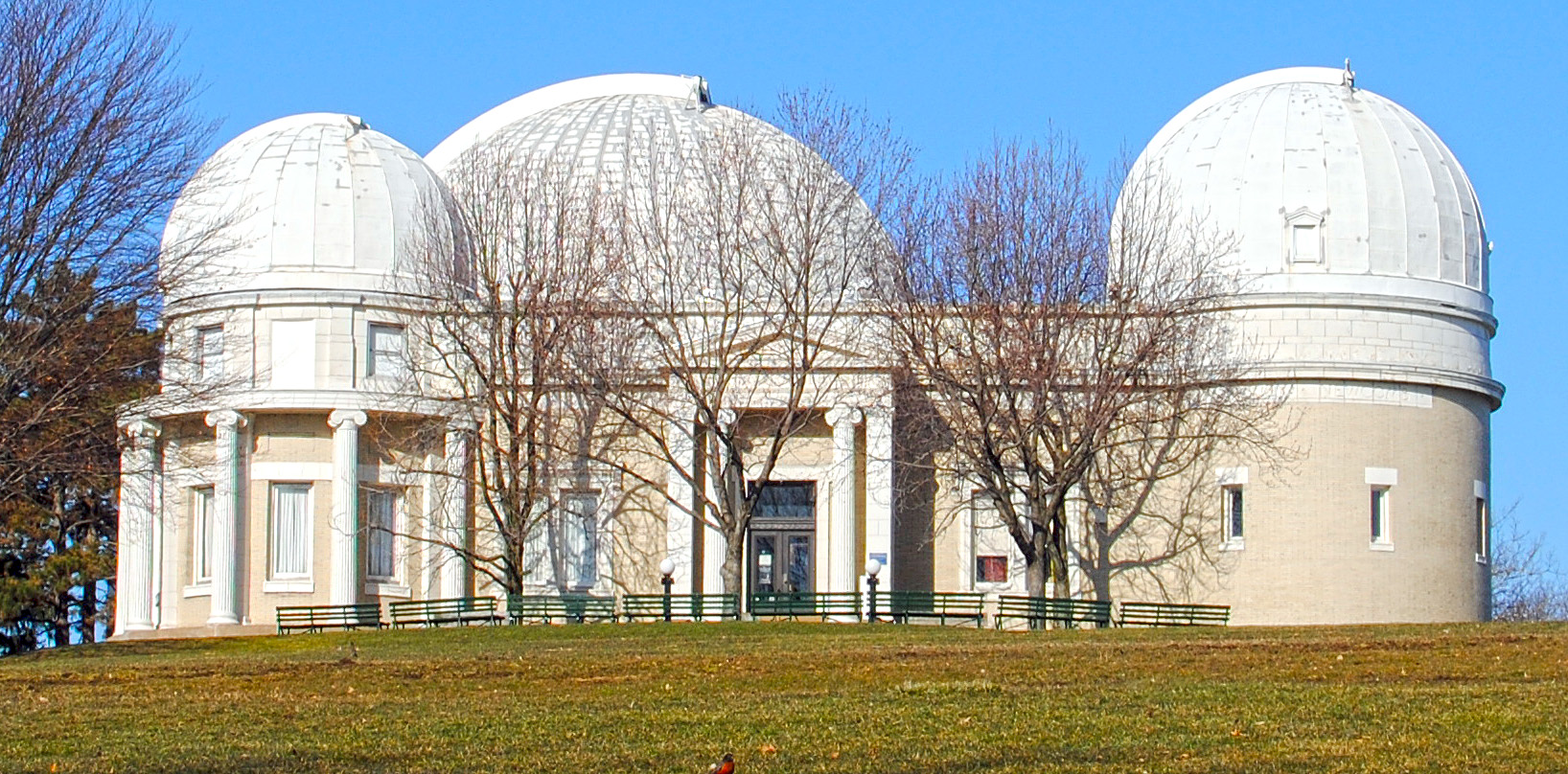
- The observatory in 2013
- Organization: University of Pittsburgh
- Observatory code: 778
- Location: Pittsburgh, Pennsylvania
- Coordinates: 40.482525°N 80.020829°W
- Established: February 15, 1859
- Website: Allegheny Observatory

Telescopes
- Thaw Memorial Refractor: 30-inch refracting telescope
- Keeler Memorial Reflector: 24-inch PlaneWave CDK
- Fitz-Clark Refractor: 13-inch refracting telescope
- Built: 1900–1912
- Architect: Architectural style(s): Thorsten E. Billquist Classic Revival
- Added to NRHP: NRHP Reference#: Governing body: June 22, 1979 79002157 University of Pittsburgh
- Allegheny Observatory
- U.S. National Register of Historic Places
- Pennsylvania state historical marker
- Pittsburgh Landmark – PHLF
- Location within Pittsburgh Location within Pennsylvania Location within the United States
- Location: 159 Riverview Ave., Pittsburgh, Pennsylvania
- Built: 1900
- Architect: Billquist, T.E.
- Architectural style: Classical Revival
- NRHP reference No.: 79002157
Significant dates
- Added to NRHP: June 22, 1979
- Designated PHMC: November 2, 1979
- Designated PHLF: 1973
- Related media on Commons

The Allegheny Observatory is an American astronomical research institution, a part of the Department of Physics and Astronomy at the University of Pittsburgh. The facility is listed on the National Register of Historic Places (ref. # 79002157, added June 22, 1979) and is designated as a Pennsylvania state and Pittsburgh History and Landmarks Foundation historic landmark.

== History ==
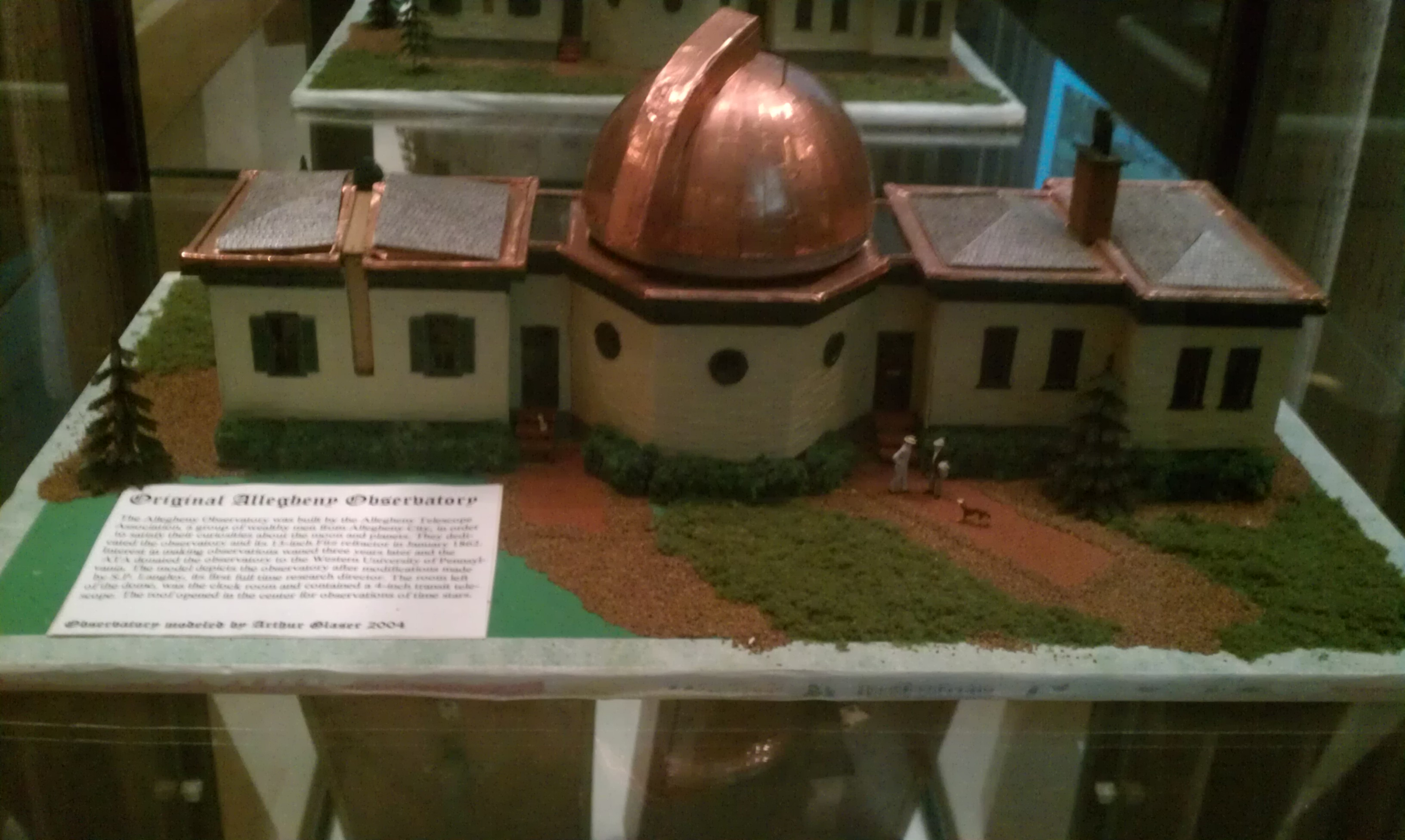
A model of the original Allegheny Observatory

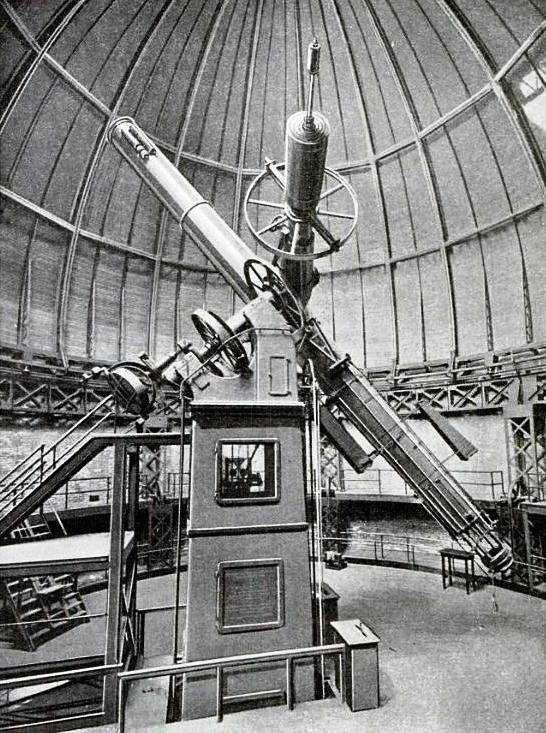
Photographic telescope at the Allegheny Observatory took 10 years to build, circa 1914

The observatory was founded on February 15, 1859, in the city of Allegheny, Pennsylvania (incorporated into the City of Pittsburgh in 1907) by a group of wealthy industrialists calling themselves the Allegheny Telescope Association. The observatory's initial purpose was for general public education as opposed to research, but by 1867 the revenues derived from this had receded. The facility was then donated to the Western University of Pennsylvania, today known as the University of Pittsburgh.

The University hired Samuel Pierpont Langley to be the first director. One of the research programs initiated under his leadership was of sunspots. He drew very detailed drawings of sunspots which are still used in astronomical textbooks to this day. He also had the building expanded to include dark rooms, class rooms, dormitories, and a lecture hall.

=== Langley’s 1869 establishment of the Allegheny Time System ===
In 1869, Langley created income for the observatory by selling subscription service to time that was accurately determined by astronomical measurements and transmitted over telegraphs to customers. The Pennsylvania Railroad was the most influential subscriber to the "Allegheny Time" system. The Allegheny Observatory's service is believed to have been the first regular and systematic system of time distribution to railroads and cities as well as the origin of the modern standard time system. By 1870, the Allegheny Time service extended over 2,500 miles with 300 telegraph offices receiving time signals. On November 18, 1883, the first day of railroad standard time in North America, the Allegheny Observatory transmitted a signal on telegraph lines operated by railroads in Canada and the United States. The signal marked noon, Eastern Standard Time, and railroads across the continent synchronized their schedules based on this signal. The standard time that began on this day continues in North American use to this day.

The revenues from the sale of time signals covered Langley's salary and the bills. Allegheny Observatory continued to supply time signals until the US Naval Observatory started offering it for free in 1920.

=== Langley’s 1879 invention of the Bolometer ===
In 1878, Langley invented the bolometer, which makes very sensitive detections of thermal radiation. He used it to measure the strong variation with wavelength of Earth’s atmospheric absorption, results used by Arrhenius in 1890 demonstrating the greenhouse effect. Langley also used it to discover new infrared atomic and molecular absorption lines and make the first accurate calculation of the solar constant. Bolometers are now essential physics instruments with applications extended to astronomy, particle physics, plasma physics, and thermal cameras.

=== Keeler’s 1895 spectroscopy proving the particulate nature of Saturn’s rings ===
In 1895, James Keeler (AO Director: 1891-1898) obtained spectroscopy of Saturn's rings with the 13-inch Fitz-Clark Refractor, proving that the rings were particles, not solid disks as thought since the 1650s and supporting James Clerk Maxwell's 1859 calculation which indicated that tidal forces necessitate rings composed of disconnected particles. Keeler's observations launched the detailed study of Saturn's rings, which today yield insights into less accessible disk systems.

=== Brashear: the 1887 Michelson-Morley interferometer optics and the 1914 Thaw telescope ===
John Brashear (Allegheny Observatory Committee Chairman: 1893-1920, Allegheny Observatory Director: 1898-1900, University of Pittsburgh Chancellor: 1901-1904) made many high-quality optics and precision instruments at his Allegheny-Observatory-affiliated shop, including the optical surfaces for the famous 1887 Michelson-Morley interferometer, which demonstrated the constant speed of light regardless of motion direction. This was a watershed moment in physics history, leading to Einstein’s theory of special relativity. Brashear also made the impressive 47-foot long 30-inch Thaw Refractor still in use at Allegheny Observatory.

=== Schlesinger’s 1914 initiation of the Thaw parallax program ===
In 1914, Frank Schlesinger (Allegheny Observatory Director: 1905-1920) began pioneering the use of photographic methods with the long-focus Thaw Refractor to measure stellar positions and parallaxes, providing direct determinations of stellar distances. Over 110,000 exposures on glass plates were taken with the Thaw Refractor by Schlesinger and the six directors that followed him. These plates are housed at Allegheny Observatory. This was the most successful photographic parallax telescope in the world, establishing the most-accurate distance scale for the local Universe in the early 20th century.

More recently George Gatewood began using the Allegheny Observatory to search for extrasolar planets as well as to follow up on claims of extrasolar planets, starting in 1972. This is done using astrometry, which is the practice of measuring the position of stars. In addition to studying the positions of stars on the thousands of photographic plates in the vaults of the observatory, George Gatewood also designed the Multichannel Astrometric Photometer (MAP) for use with the Thaw telescope to measure the position of a target star and its close neighbors on images taken 6 months apart. This technique takes advantage of parallax. If the target star has a companion then it will wobble due to the gravitational pull of the unseen companion. The size of the companion can be measured by the size of the wobble.

MAP is no longer in use and the Thaw telescope is in the process of rewiring and upgrading.

A model of the original observatory can be found in the Miniature Railroad & Village exhibit at Carnegie Science Center in Pittsburgh and in 2012 a documentary film was released covering the observatory's history.

== The Lens-napping ==
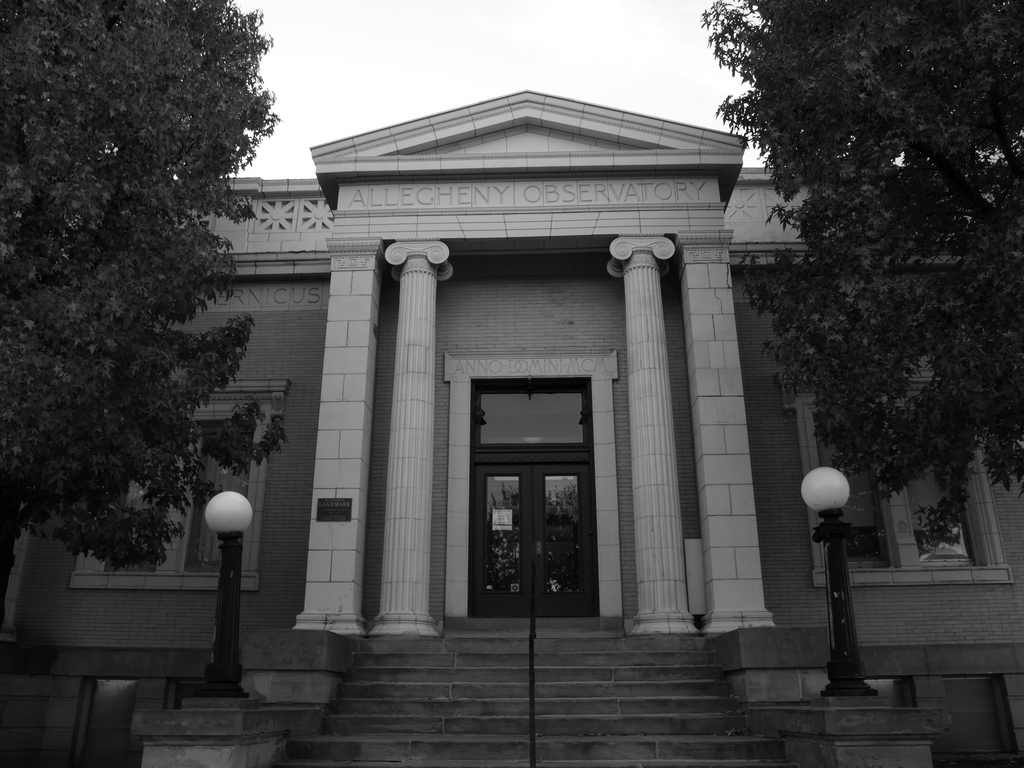
Observatory entrance

Langley was the director when he returned home in Allegheny City on July 8, 1872, following a conference. Observatory staff advised him that the lens of the 13 inch Fitz Telescope had been taken for ransom which Langley refused to pay; an argument with the unknown lens-napper ensued without resolve. It has been speculated that Langley knew the identity of the lens-napper, his or her identity is still a mystery. The lens-napper thought that with the involvement of the newspapers investigating the incidents his identity may be discovered so told Langley he could have back the lens. No clue was given as to its location but it was eventually found in a Beaver Falls, Pennsylvania, hotel wastepaper basket. It being scratched made it useless so it was re-ground by lens maker Alvan Clark. When it was reinstalled the clarity was improved so the lens-napping benefited the observatory. In gratitude, Langley added Clark's name to the telescope.

== Heavier-than-air flight research ==
Langley also researched heavier-than-air flight behind the observatory. To study the aerodynamic behavior of different forms traveling at speeds up to 70 mph, he built a 30' spring "whirling arm" to which stuffed birds and wings he made were attached. After leaving Allegheny Observatory to become secretary of the Smithsonian in 1888, he continued his flight research, designing and flying the first, unmanned, aircraft capable of stable continuously powered flight from a houseboat on the Potomac River. His full-size manned Aerodrome was funded by the U.S. Army. Two well-publicized crashes of the Aerodrome in 1903 ended his flight research.

== The new Allegheny Observatory ==
The original observatory building was replaced by the current structure, shown in the photograph above. It was designed in the Classic Revival style by Thorsten E. Billquist. The cornerstone was laid in 1900, and the new structure was completed in 1912. It is located four miles north of downtown Pittsburgh, Pennsylvania, at Riverview Park. The building is a tan brick and white terra cotta hilltop temple whose Classical forms and decoration symbolize the unity of art and science. The L-shaped building consists of a library, lecture hall, classrooms, laboratories, offices, and three hemispherical domed telescope enclosures. Two were reserved for research; one for use by schools and the general public.

The core of the building is a small rotunda, housing an opalescent glass window depicting the Greek muse of astronomy, Urania, designed by artist Mary Elizabeth Tillinghast. A crypt in the basement of the observatory holds the ashes of two eminent astronomers and former directors of the Allegheny Observatory, James Edward Keeler and John Brashear. In addition, the crypt holds the remains of Brashear's wife Phoebe and Keeler's wife Cora Matthews Keeler and son Henry Bowman Keeler.

The original observatory building was converted into an athletics training facility in 1907 and used by the university's football team. The original observatory building was sold, along with the rest of the adjacent university buildings, to the Protestant Orphan Asylum prior to the move of the main academic portion of the university to the Oakland section of Pittsburgh in 1909. The original observatory building was torn down in the 1950s and the site is now occupied by Triangle Tech.

== Current work ==
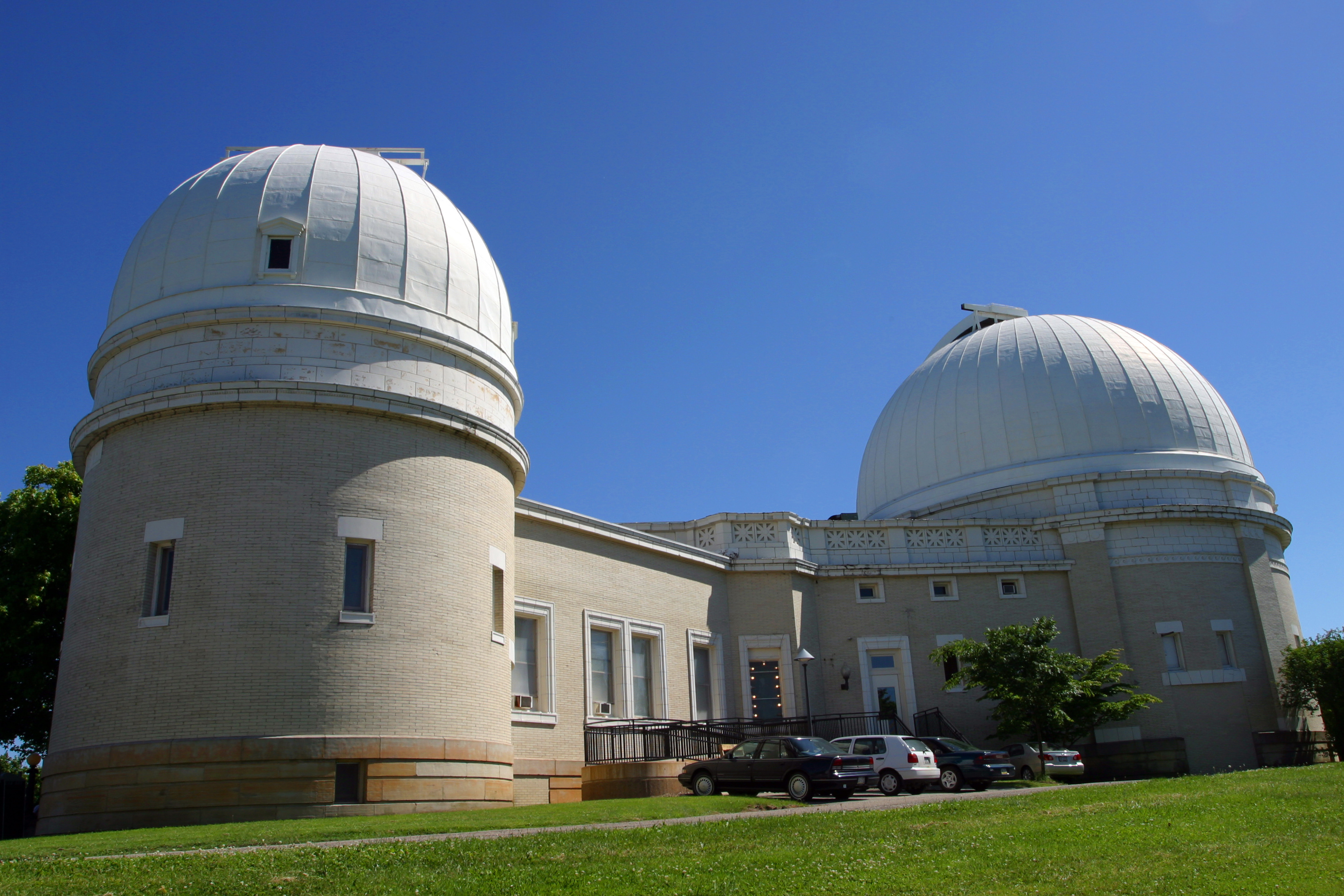
University of Pittsburgh's Allegheny Observatory

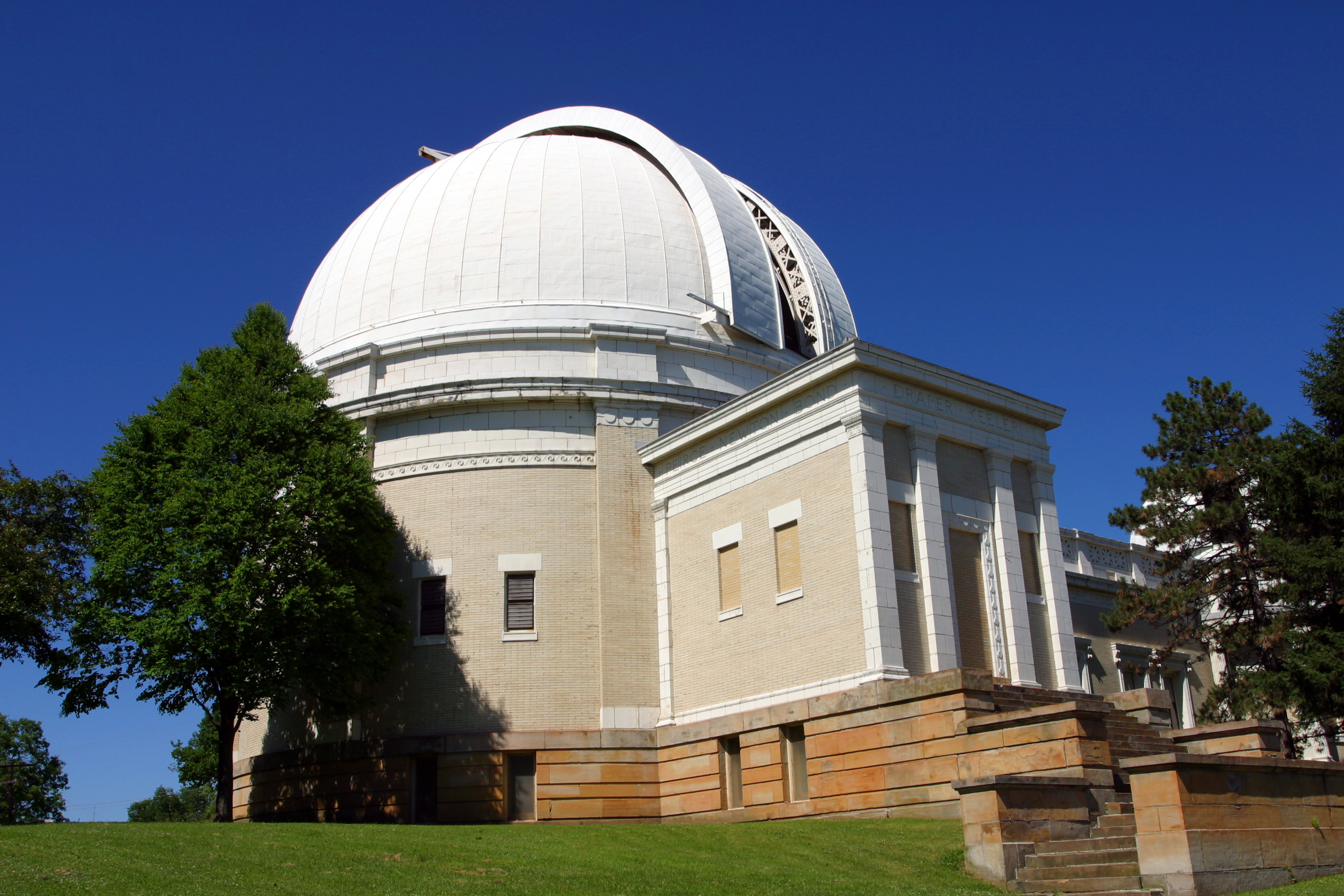

The main active research pursuit at the Allegheny Observatory involves detections of extrasolar planets. This is done using photometry, which is the practice of measuring the brightness of stars. The brightness of a target star and its close neighbors are measured on digital images taken every 30–60 seconds, and if a planet crosses (transits) in front of its parent star's disk, then the observed visual brightness of the star drops a small amount. The amount the star dims depends on the relative sizes of the star and the planet. The research team consists of students at the University of Pittsburgh whose observations have recently contributed to a collaborative effort to observe a transit of the planet HD 80606 b. The group is also actively contributing to upgrading the Allegheny Observatory.

In 2009, the university's Department of Geology and Planetary Science installed Western Pennsylvania's only seismic station, which is connected to IRIS Consortium networks, in the observatory.

== Tours ==
When the new Allegheny Observatory was designed it was done with the public in mind; the floor plan included a lecture hall. When the new facility first went into operation, on every clear evening it was opened for the public to look through the 13" telescope but if it were a cloudy night "they would be given an illustrated lecture on astronomy." John Brashear once said "the Allegheny observatory would remain forever free to the people" and to this day it has although in modern times the free public tours are only offered a couple nights each week.

== See also ==
- List of astronomical observatories
- Samuel Pierpont Langley, Allegheny Observatory's first director.
- James Edward Keeler
- John A. Brashear
- Henry Fitz

Preceded by Pittsburgh Athletic Association	University of Pittsburgh buildings Allegheny Observatory; Constructed: 1900–1912	Succeeded by Gardner Steel Conference Center
