= Vukmir =

- Pronunciation: [vuːk]
- Gender: male
- Language: Serbian, Slovene, Croatian, Macedonian, Bulgarian, Russian, Ukrainian

Origin
- Language: Slavic
- Meaning: "wolf" + "lord"
- Region of origin: Slavic

Other names
- Variant forms: Vukmira (female); Vukmirović (surname)
- Related names: See Vuk (name) and list

Vukmir (Serbian Cyrillic: Вукмир) is a Slavic male given name and surname. It is derived from the Slavic noun vuk (wolf) and mir (peace). It is one of many Serbian given names derived from vuk. All the derivatives from vuk were regarded as apotropaic names. At least 66 people with the surname died at the Jasenovac concentration camp. It may refer to:

== People ==
- Leah Vukmir (born 1958), American politician
- Dragan Vukmir (born 1978), Serbian footballer
- Rade Vukmir, American emergency and critical care physician

== Fictional characters ==
- Vukmir, portrayed by Sergej Trifunović, is the main fictional villain from the 2010 controversial Serbian movie A Serbian Film

== See also ==
- Vladimir Velmar-Janković, writer, pen name "Jorge Vukmir"
