= Children's Museum of Pittsburgh =

Children's museum in Pennsylvania, US

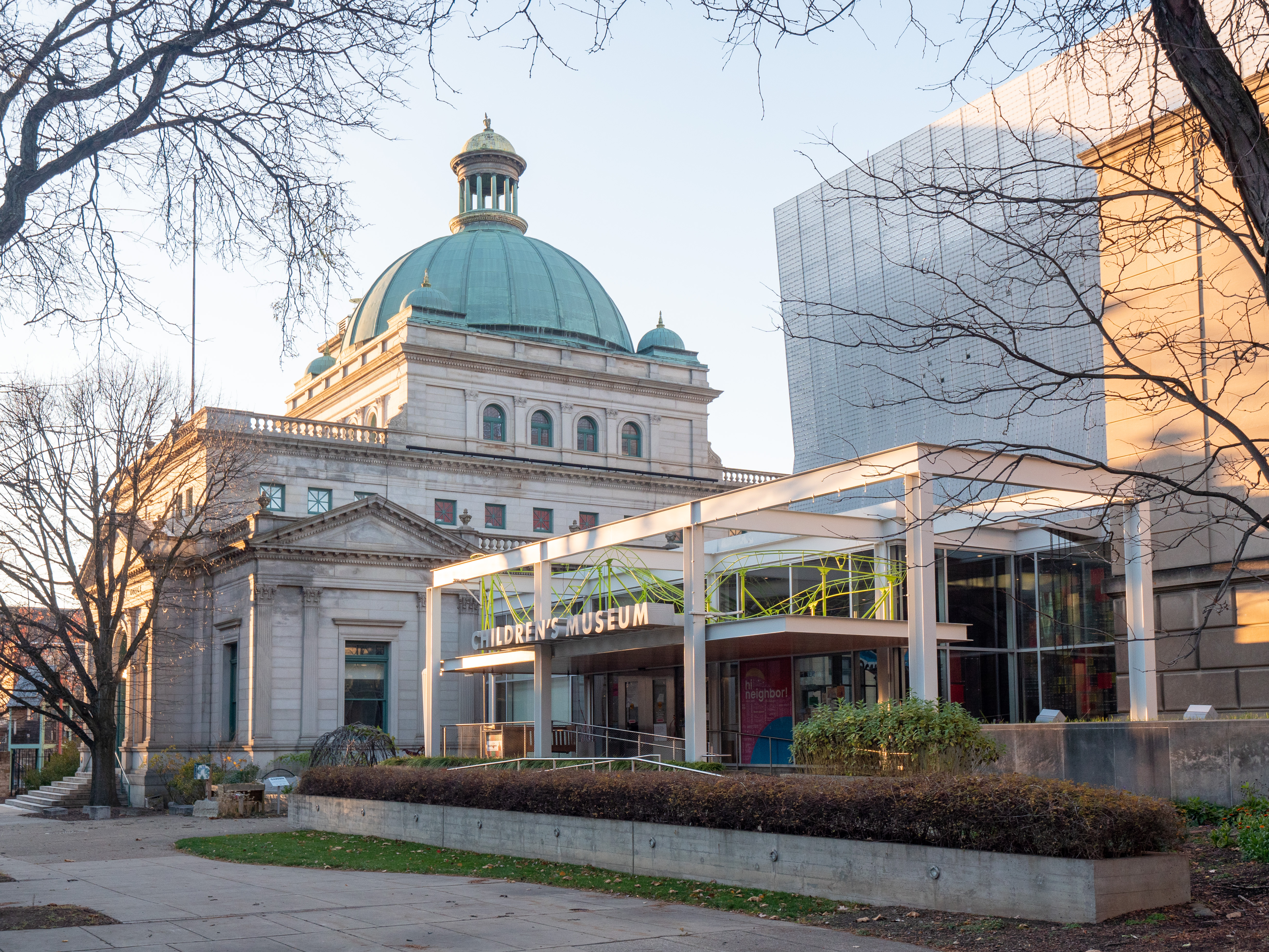
- The original Children's Museum facility in the former Allegheny Post Office building
- Location: 10 Children's Way, Allegheny Center, Pittsburgh, Pennsylvania, United States
- Coordinates: 40.4529°N 80.0064°W

The Children's Museum of Pittsburgh is a hands-on interactive children's museum in Pittsburgh, Pennsylvania. It is in the Allegheny Center neighborhood in Pittsburgh's Northside.

== History ==
The Children's Museum of Pittsburgh was founded in 1983 in the old Allegheny Post Office, gifted to the museum by the Pittsburgh History and Landmarks Foundation, and is situated on Pittsburgh's North Side, formerly Allegheny City. The neighboring Buhl Planetarium building was vacated by 1991 when it was superseded by the nearby Kamin Science Center. The museum grew from a traveling mobile museum started at the Three Rivers Arts Festival in 1972, and was part of the first wave of children's museums spreading across the country at that time.

=== New building ===
In the early 2000s, it was announced the museum would be expanding from the old Beaux Arts-style post office into the neighboring vacant Art Deco Buhl Planetarium. A plan was devised by Koning Eizenberg Architecture, Inc. to connect the two historic structures with a modern glass addition over what was a street called Allegheny Square. The street was vacated and realigned and the addition was built.

The Children's Museum of Pittsburgh became the largest Silver LEED certified museum in the country in March 2006. This validates that the museum's expansion has been designed and constructed using sustainable practices with particular attention to site development, water conservation, energy management, using recycled materials, waste management, reusing resources, indoor air quality as well as developing new programs for visitors. To offer teaching moments about the new green museum, many of the building's structural and mechanical systems are left exposed.

=== Buhl Community Park ===
In 2010, officials announced plans to rehab a rundown park in front of the museum. The centerpiece of the new park is a fog sculpture by Ned Kahn. The park opened on June 23, 2012, during a community celebration.

=== Grounds ===
In its seasonal "Backyard", the museum grounds includes an interactive environment called "Allegheny Waterworks" which incorporates preserved local architectural relics.

A garden on the grounds once displayed sculptures of Guyasuta, Christopher Gist and others, designed by sculptor Charles Keck and rescued from the Manchester Bridge when it was razed in 1970. The garden was removed in the 2000s to make room for more parking. The Guyasuta and Gist sculptures have been reinstalled near Stage AE in the North Shore neighborhood.

=== Exhibits ===
The Children's Museum of Pittsburgh houses several ongoing exhibits as well as rotating exhibits. The MAKESHOP, Kindness Gallery, Studio, Backyard, Garage, Garden, Theater, Waterplay, and Nursery areas are ongoing interactive exhibits and encourage touch and play. Also located within the museum are iconic items from the show Mister Rogers' Neighborhood. These include the original puppets, one of Fred Rogers' sweaters, and his sneakers.

== Programs ==
The Children's Museum of Pittsburgh presents a wide variety of programs for children in fields ranging from dance and rocket building to quilting and robotics. Visiting artists offer workshops in a host of media, including pottery, Japanese paper cutting, animation and painting. The museum's extensive outreach program offers performances, workshops, after school programs, artist days and festival programs for schools and groups throughout the year. Educational field trips are offered for local schools, scouts and other groups. The museum has collaborated with a number of regional institutions and programs, such as the University of Pittsburgh and the Create a Comic Project.

== Awards ==
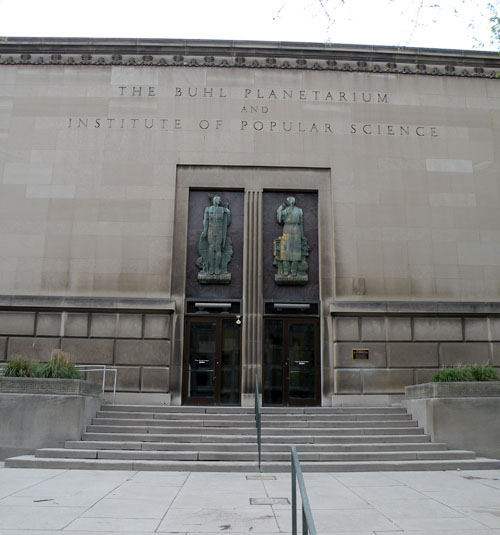
The former Buhl Planetarium building is now part of the Children's Museum

The addition has received numerous awards, including a 2009 National Medal for Museum and Library Service from the Institute of Museum and Library Services, National Trust for Historic Preservation award, LEED silver certification, and an award from American Institute of Architects.

Children's Museum Executive Director Jane Werner received the Green Building Alliance 2006 Shades of Green Leadership Award which celebrates leaders who have helped transform the Pittsburgh region into a more sustainable place to live and work. Werner's contributions cited include launching a new program/initiative supporting green-building related activities; raising significant community awareness and outreach of green issues through materials, programs and events; and influencing the adoption of a program/policy through advocacy efforts and implementing green management and operation policies within the Children's Museum of Pittsburgh.
