= Allegheny Post Office =

- U.S. National Register of Historic Places
- City of Pittsburgh Historic Structure
- Pittsburgh Landmark – PHLF
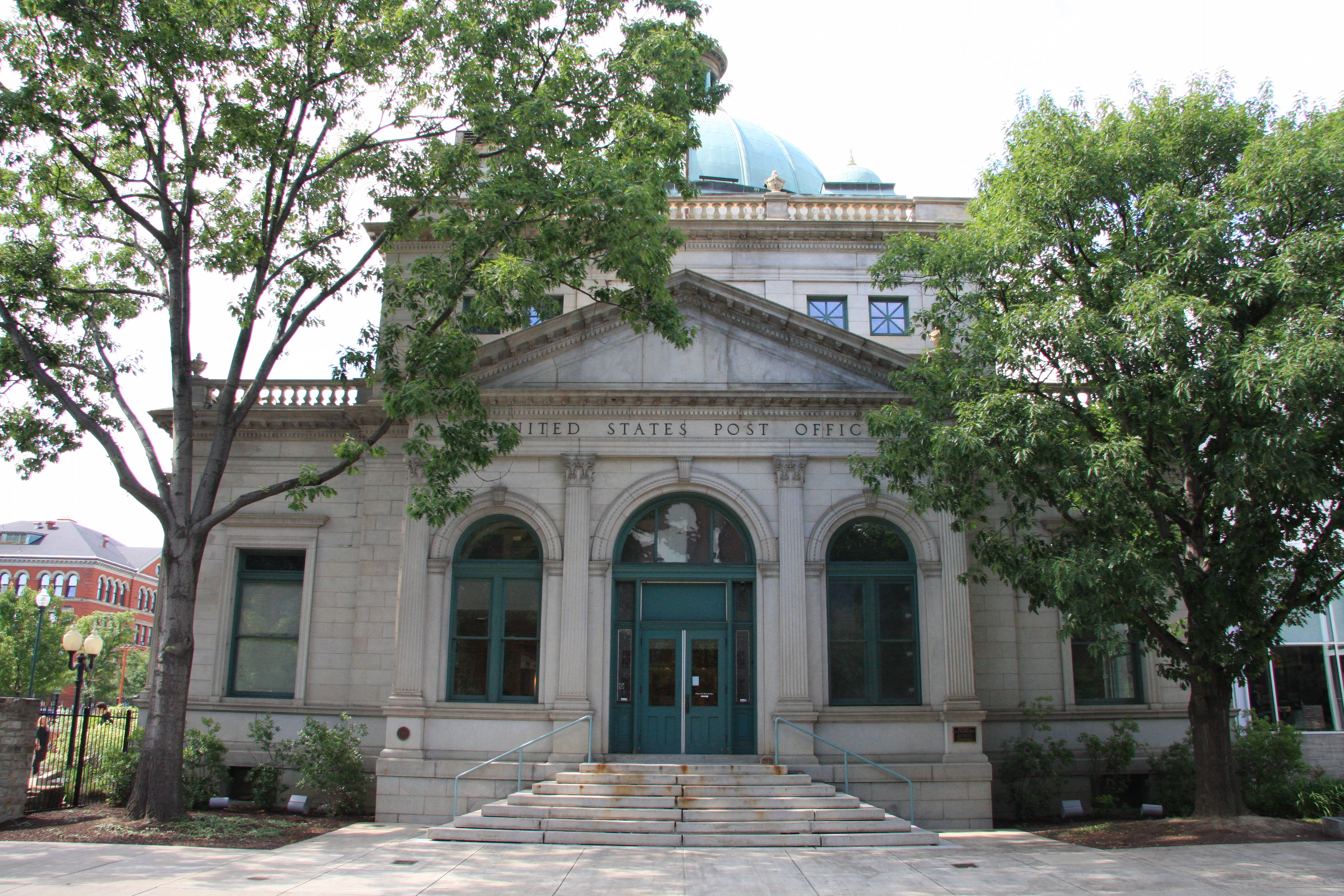

- Location within Pittsburgh Location within Pennsylvania Location within the United States
- Location: Allegheny Center, Pittsburgh, Pennsylvania
- Coordinates: 40°27′9″N 80°0′26″W
- Built: 1897
- Architectural style: Late 19th And 20th Century Revivals
- NRHP reference No.: 71000683

Significant dates
- Added to NRHP: July 27, 1971
- Designated CPHS: December 26, 1972
- Designated PHLF: 1971

The Allegheny Post Office is a historic building in the Allegheny Center neighborhood on the North Side of Pittsburgh, Pennsylvania. It was built in 1897 as the main post office for what was then the independent city of Allegheny and later became part of Pittsburgh. After the post office closed in 1967, the building was slated for demolition as part of the Allegheny Center urban renewal project. However, the Pittsburgh History and Landmarks Foundation (PHLF) mounted a successful campaign to save the building, raising about $835,000 to purchase and restore it for their own use. In 1972, the building reopened as the Pittsburgh History and Landmarks Museum, exhibiting items from PHLF's collections of historic artifacts.

In 1983, the lower level of the building became the first home of the Children's Museum of Pittsburgh. The Children's Museum eventually expanded to occupy the entire post office building as well as the neighboring Buhl Planetarium building and a new addition.

The building was listed on the listed on the National Register of Historic Places in 1971. It was the first building in Allegheny County to be added to the register.
