= Allegheny Commons =

Municipal park located in the North Side region of Pittsburgh

Allegheny Commons Park
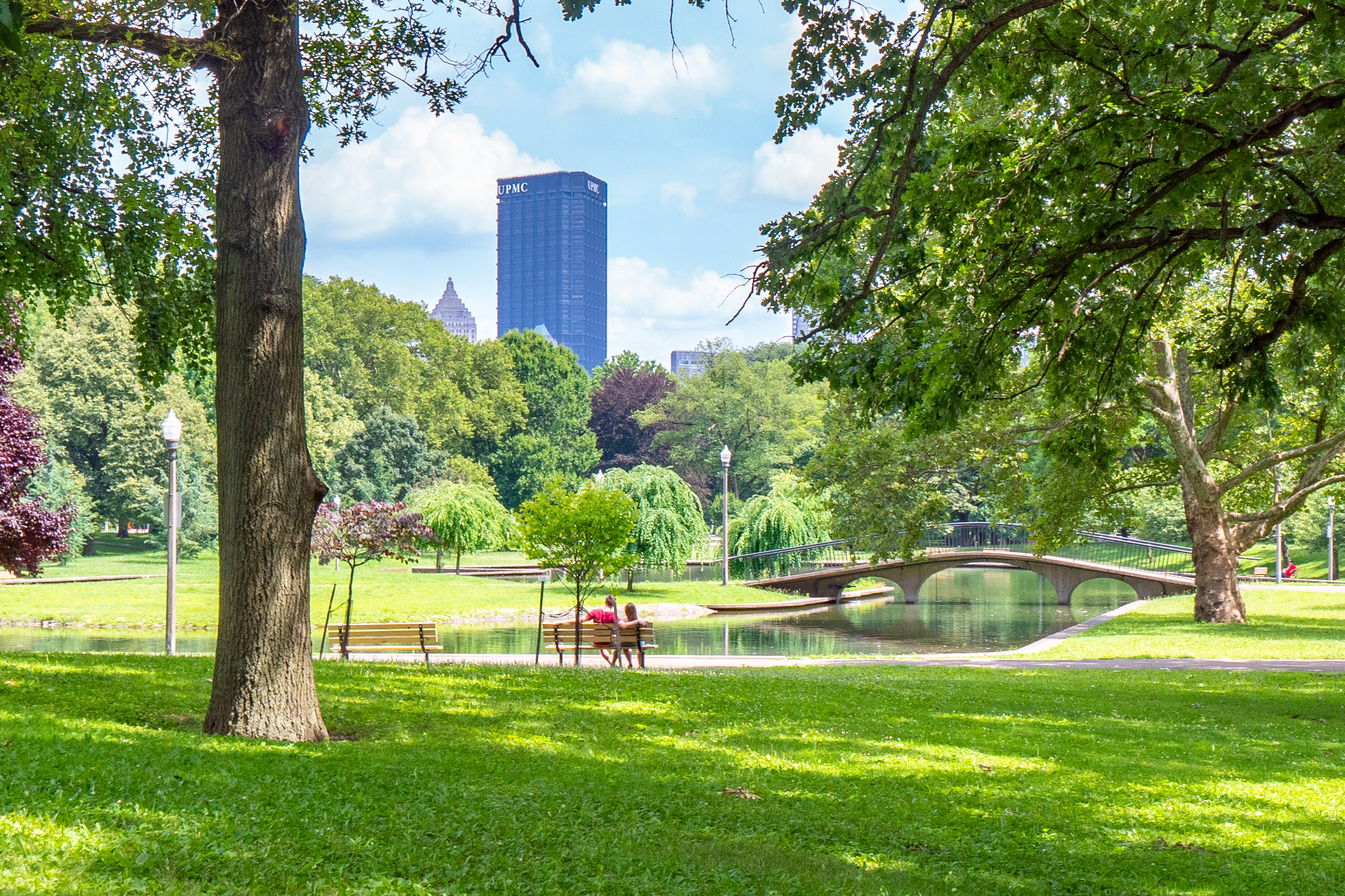
- Location of the Allegheny Commons Park in Pittsburgh
- Interactive map of Allegheny Commons Park
- Location: Allegheny Center neighborhood, Pittsburgh, Pennsylvania
- Nearest city: Pittsburgh
- Coordinates: 40°27′12.4″N 80°0′43.9″W
- Created: 1867
- Operator: City of Pittsburgh Parks & Recreation (CitiParks), Department of Public Works
- Status: Open all year
- Designation: November 26, 1990
- Website: Official website

Allegheny Commons is a municipal park located in Pittsburgh's North Side. The park surrounds the neighborhood of Allegheny Center. Dating to 1867, it is the oldest park in the city of Pittsburgh. (Note: Note, however, that it did not become part of Pittsburgh until the annexation of Allegheny, Pennsylvania, in 1907.)

== History ==
The park was once free grazing land which surrounded the first 32 blocks of Allegheny City in John Redick's 1784 town plan. It was re-made into a municipal park in the 1860s by landscape architects hired by Allegheny City.

Allegheny Commons Park has three main parts, all of which are in the Allegheny Center neighborhood: Allegheny Commons Park West Park, Allegheny Commons Park North Park, and Allegheny Commons Park East Park. The West Park portion is the largest of the three, and it has housed the National Aviary since 1952.

A non-profit organization, The Allegheny Commons Initiative maintains the park acting as a liaison between it and the city through advocacy, fundraising, and project management.

== Western Penitentiary ==
From 1826 to 1880, the first prison west of the Atlantic Plain operated in the present day park. It was demolished in 1880. In 1882 a new prison bearing its name was completed a few blocks west, along the Ohio River.

Charles Dickens visited the city from March 20–22, 1842, during his American tour. He visited the prison and some scholars believe conditions at the facility inspired elements of the classic A Christmas Carol.

The site is famous for housing 118 Confederate soldiers after their capture in Morgan's Raid a dozen miles to the west. It held them from August 5, 1863, until they were transferred to a military fort in New Jersey on March 18, 1864. Although conditions were good for the time, at least eight Confederates died during the winter, one while attempting escape.

== Gallery ==
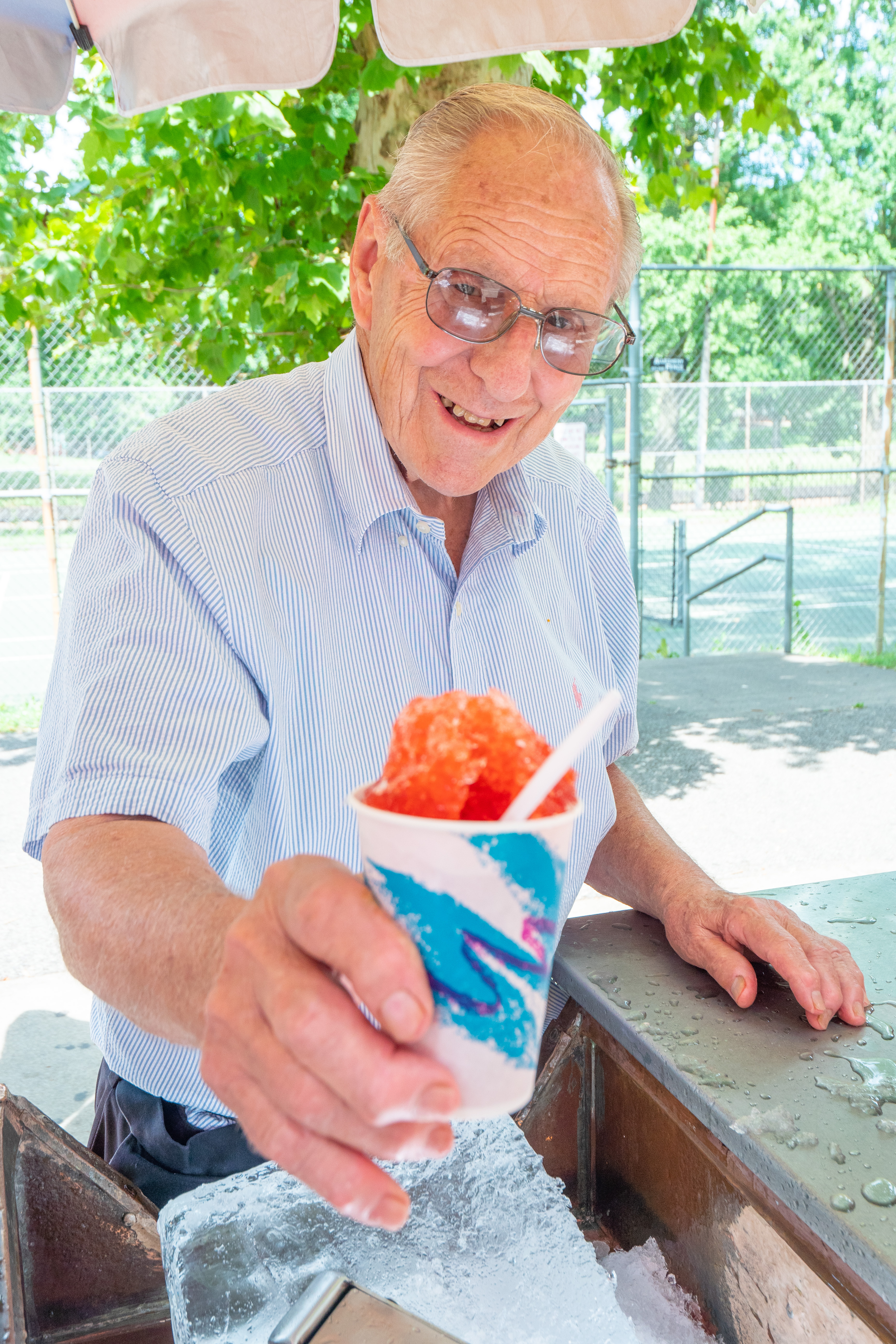
Gus Kalaris, owner of Gus and Yiayia's.

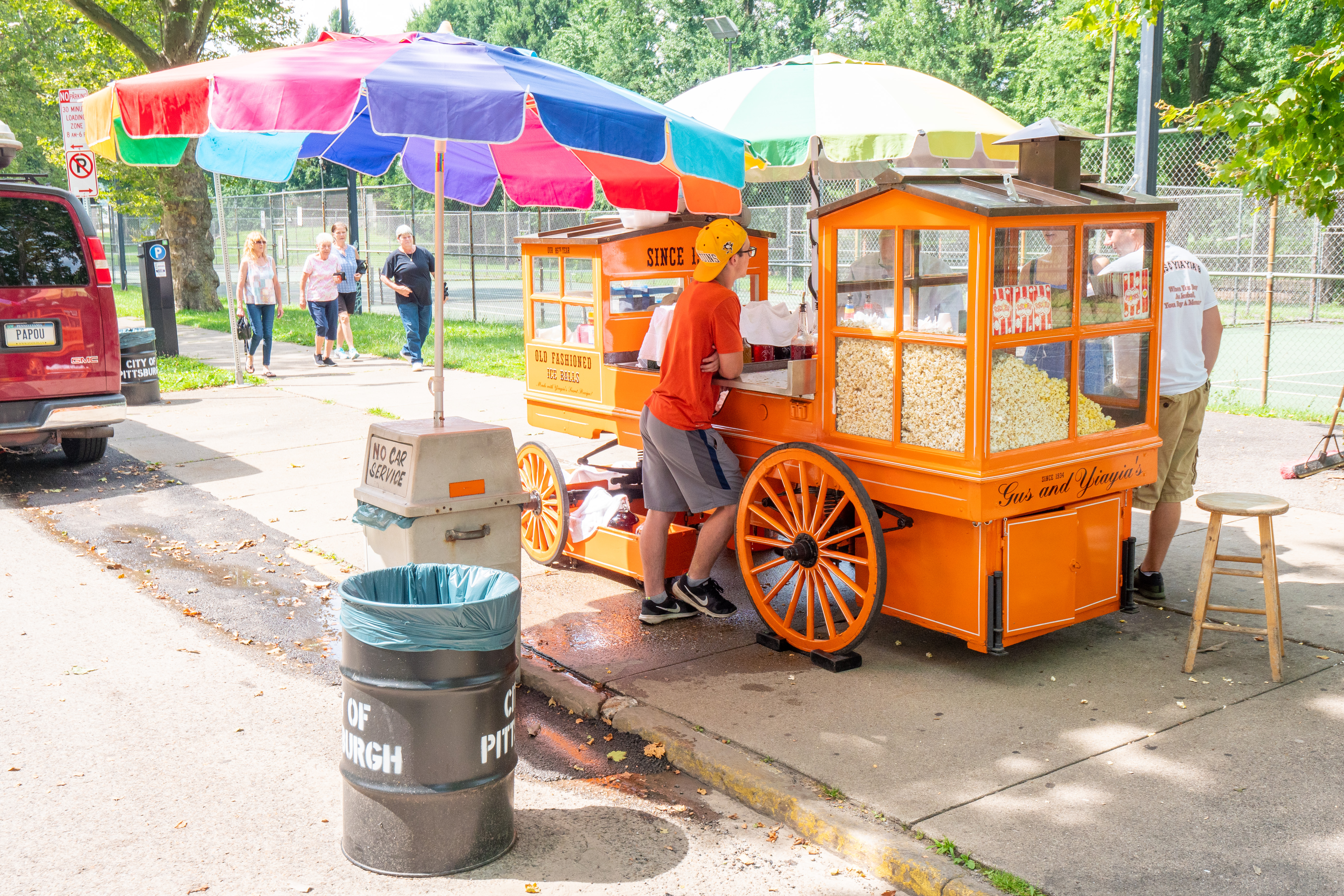
Gus and Yiayia's is a historic shaved ice stand in Pittsburgh's Allegheny Commons Park.

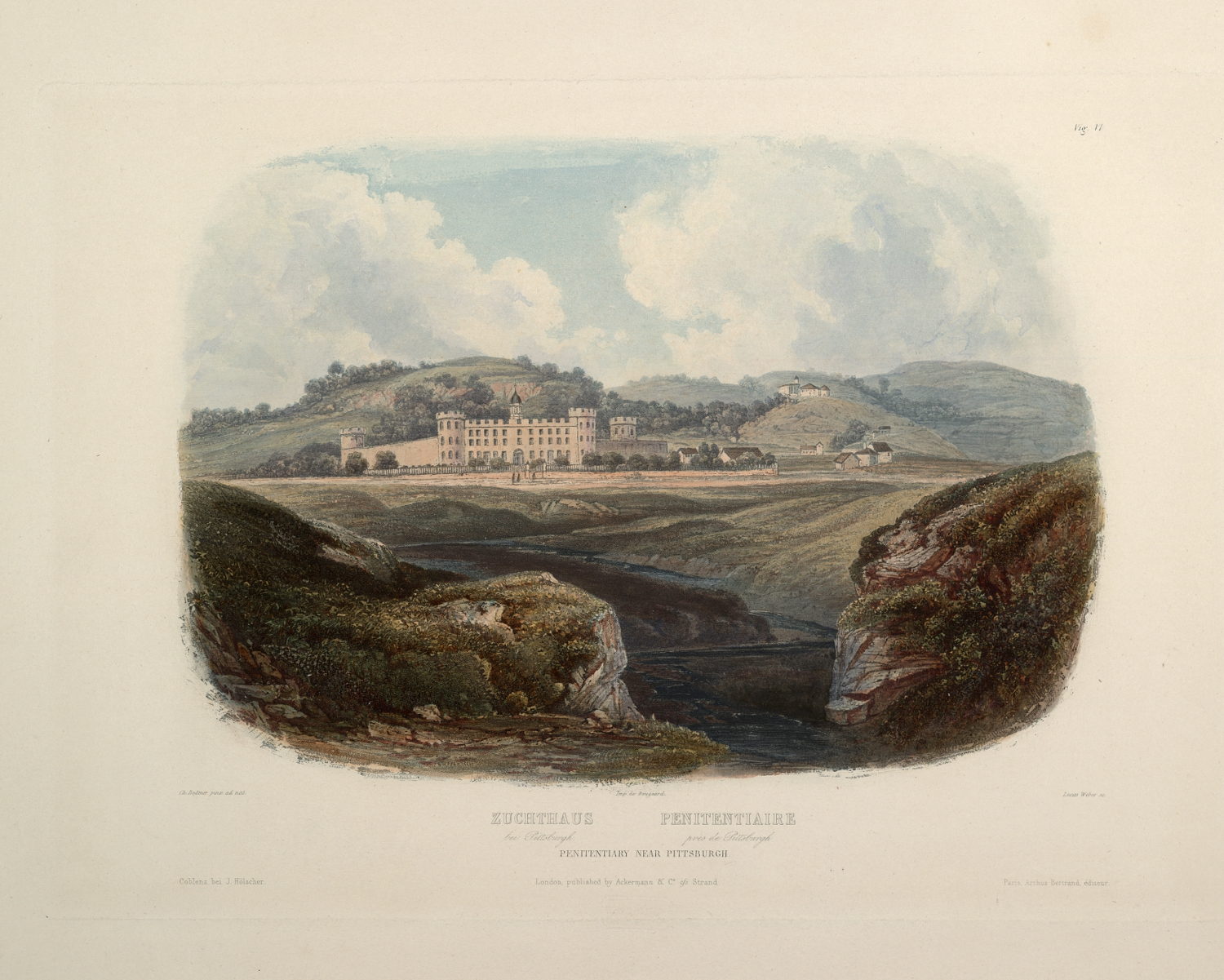
"Penitentiary near Pittsburgh" by Karl Bodmer, 1832–1839.

== See also ==
- List of Pittsburgh neighborhoods
