= Gus and Yiayia's =

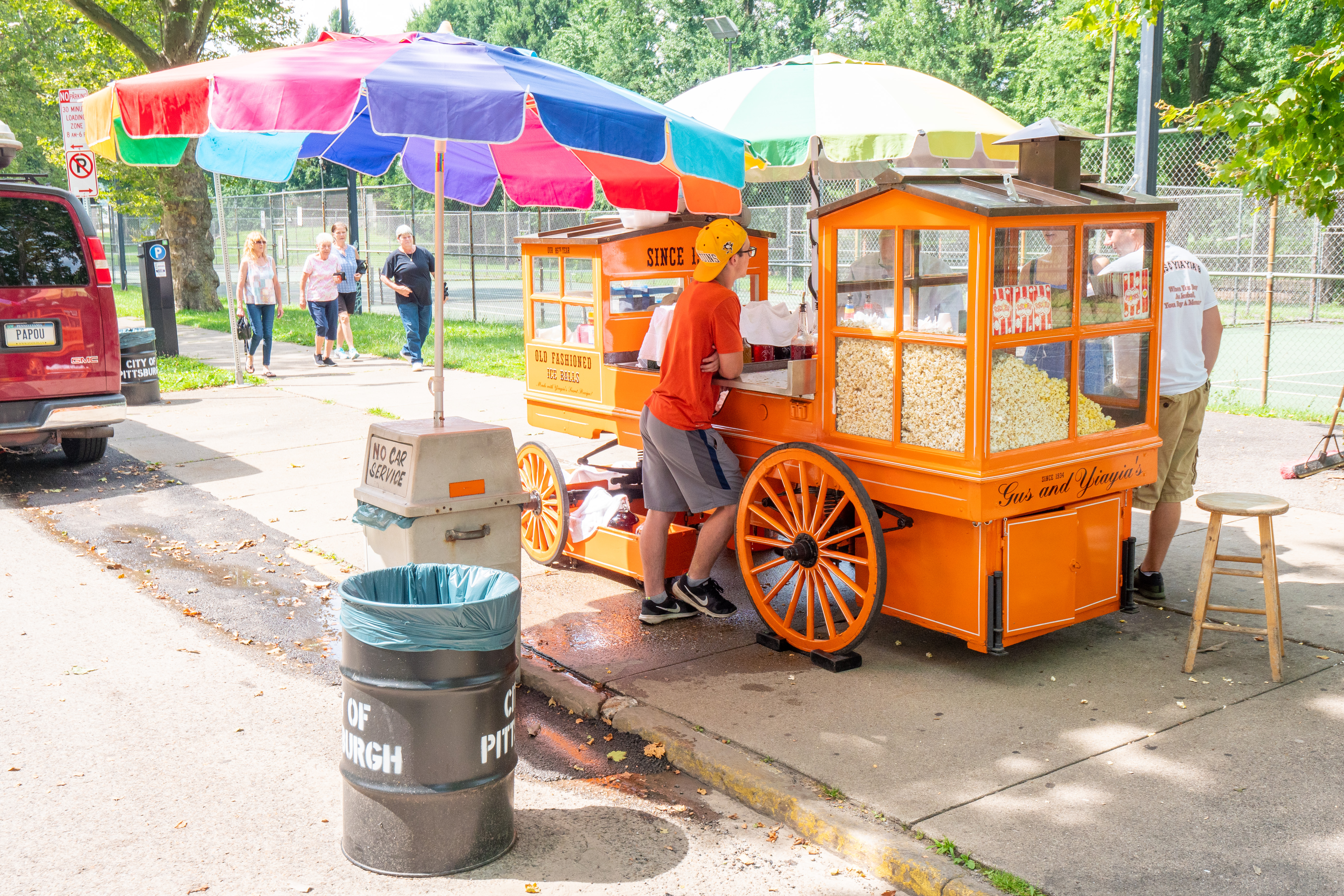
- Interactive map of Gus and Yiayia's

Restaurant information
- Established: 1934
- Location: 638 West Ohio St., Pittsburgh, Allegheny County, Pennsylvania, 15212
- Coordinates: 40.4520947°N 80.0122423°W

Gus and Yiayia's (Note: The stand's name is usually rendered Gus and Yiayia's, reflecting the spelling used on the cart itself; media sources vary in their styling and spacing.) is a seasonal food cart in Allegheny Commons Park on the North Side of Pittsburgh, Pennsylvania. The cart was acquired by the Kalaris family in 1934 and later became known as Gus and Yiayia's. It is known for its ice balls and is a longstanding summertime fixture in the neighborhood.

== History ==
The snack cart itself dates to 1917. Gus Kalaris's father bought the cart in 1934 for $175. According to Kalaris, the name Yiayia, a Greek word meaning "grandmother," was added later. It was painted on the cart after he took over the business while still in high school, in reference to his mother, Pauline Kalaris.

After Pauline's death in 1992, Gus Kalaris's wife, Stella Kalaris, came to be known as the stand's "Yiayia". Following Stella Kalaris's death in 2016, a scholarship in her name was established to benefit local children.

Gus Kalaris died in June 2024 at the age of 92, several months after the stand marked its 90th anniversary. He remained the owner of Gus and Yiayia's at the time of his death. Kalaris' son-in-law, Art Avlon, said in 2025 that the family plans to continue operating the stand.

== Menu ==
The stand sells ice balls, peanuts, and popcorn, with ice balls as its signature item. The ice used for the stand's products originally came from a manufacturer on Brighton Road; later it was sourced from Ohio.

== Legacy and recognition ==
Gus and Yiayia's was featured in Rick Sebak's 1997 documentary North Side Story. In 2012, the Pittsburgh City Council proclaimed April 25 "Gus and Yiayia Day". In 2017, Pittsburgh Magazine included Gus Kalaris among its "Best of the 'Burgh" personalities. In 2021, a miniature version of the cart was added to the Kamin Science Center's Miniature Railroad and Village. In 2025, a stretch of West Ohio Street near Allegheny Commons Park was given the honorary name "Gus & Yiayia Way" in recognition of the stand's longstanding role in the community.
