= List of mayors of Allegheny, Pennsylvania =

This is a list of mayors of the Pittsburgh suburb and "twin city" of Allegheny, Pennsylvania which was annexed by Pittsburgh in 1907 and is currently the North Side of the city.

== Burgesses of the Borough of Allegheny ==
- John Irwin 1829-34
- Hugh Davis 1835-38
- John Morrison 1839-40

== Mayors of the City of Allegheny ==
Mayoral terms were for one year until 1868, two years from 1868-1872, and three years from 1872 on.

Mayor	Party	Took office	Left office	Notes
William Robinson Jr.	Whig	17 Jul 1840	15 Jan 1841	First white child born on the site of Allegheny City
Thomas Sample	Whig	15 Jan 1841	28 Jan 1842	
William Barclay Foster	Independent	28 Jan 1842	12 Jan 1844	Father of songwriter Stephen Foster
Hezekiah Nixon	Whig	12 Jan 1844	16 Jan 1846	
Robert Simpson Cassatt	Whig	16 Jan 1846	15 Jan 1847	Father of painter Mary Cassatt
Henry Campbell	Whig	15 Jan 1847	12 Jan 1849	
Jonathan Rush	Whig	12 Jan 1849	11 Jan 1850	
Hugh S. Fleming	Whig	11 Jan 1850	14 Jan 1853	
Robert W. Park	Whig	14 Jan 1853	13 Jan 1854	
William B. Adams	Independent	13 Jan 1854	16 Jan 1857	
Herman Jeremiah DeHaven	Independent Republican	16 Jan 1857	15 Jan 1858	
Jacob Stuckrath	Democratic	15 Jan 1858	14 Jan 1859	
John Morrison	Republican	14 Jan 1859	11 Jan 1861	
Simon Drum	Republican	11 Jan 1861	12 Aug 1862	Greeted Abraham Lincoln in his visit here on 14 February 1861; resigned to enter Civil War
James Miller		12 Aug 1862	4 Sep 1862	Acting mayor for 24 days upon Drum's departure
Alexander C. Alexander	Republican	4 Sep 1862	13 Jan 1865	Completed Drum's unexpired term, then re-elected twice
John Morrison	Republican	13 Jan 1865	17 Jan 1868	
Simon Drum	Republican	17 Jan 1868	14 Jan 1870	
Alexander Purviance Callow	Republican	14 Jan 1870	18 Apr 1874	Only mayor to die in office
David Neillie	Republican	18 Apr 1874	21 May 1874	Appointed to temporary office upon the death of Callow
Hugh S. Fleming	Republican	21 May 1874	5 Jan 1875	Completed Callow's unexpired term
Ormsby Phillips	Independent	5 Jan 1875	8 Jan 1878	
Thomas Megraw	Republican	8 Jan 1878	4 Apr 1881	
Lewis Peterson, Jr.	Republican	4 Apr 1881	7 Apr 1884	
James G. Wyman	Republican	7 Apr 1884	4 Apr 1887	
Richard Turner Pearson	Republican	4 Apr 1887	7 Apr 1890	
James G. Wyman	Republican	7 Apr 1890	24 Feb 1892	Only mayor to be impeached and put in jail while in office
Nicholas H. Voegtly	Republican	24 Feb 1892	2 May 1892	Served as mayor during Wyman's impeachment and imprisonment
William M. Kennedy	Republican	2 May 1892	6 Apr 1896	Completed Wyman's unexpired term, then re-elected
Charles Geyer	Republican	6 Apr 1896	3 Apr 1899	
James G. Wyman	Republican	3 Apr 1899	28 May 1901	Ousted by state government's "ripper bill"
John R. Murphy	Republican	28 May 1901	6 Apr 1903	Appointed by Gov. William A. Stone under the ripper bill; title of office changed to "Recorder"
James G. Wyman	Citizens / Democratic	6 Apr 1903	2 Apr 1906	Title of office restored to Mayor on 24 April 1903
Charles Frederick Kirschler	Republican	2 Apr 1906	6 Dec 1907	Last two years of his term served as Deputy Mayor of Pittsburgh
