= Allegheny Center =

- Neighborhood of Pittsburgh
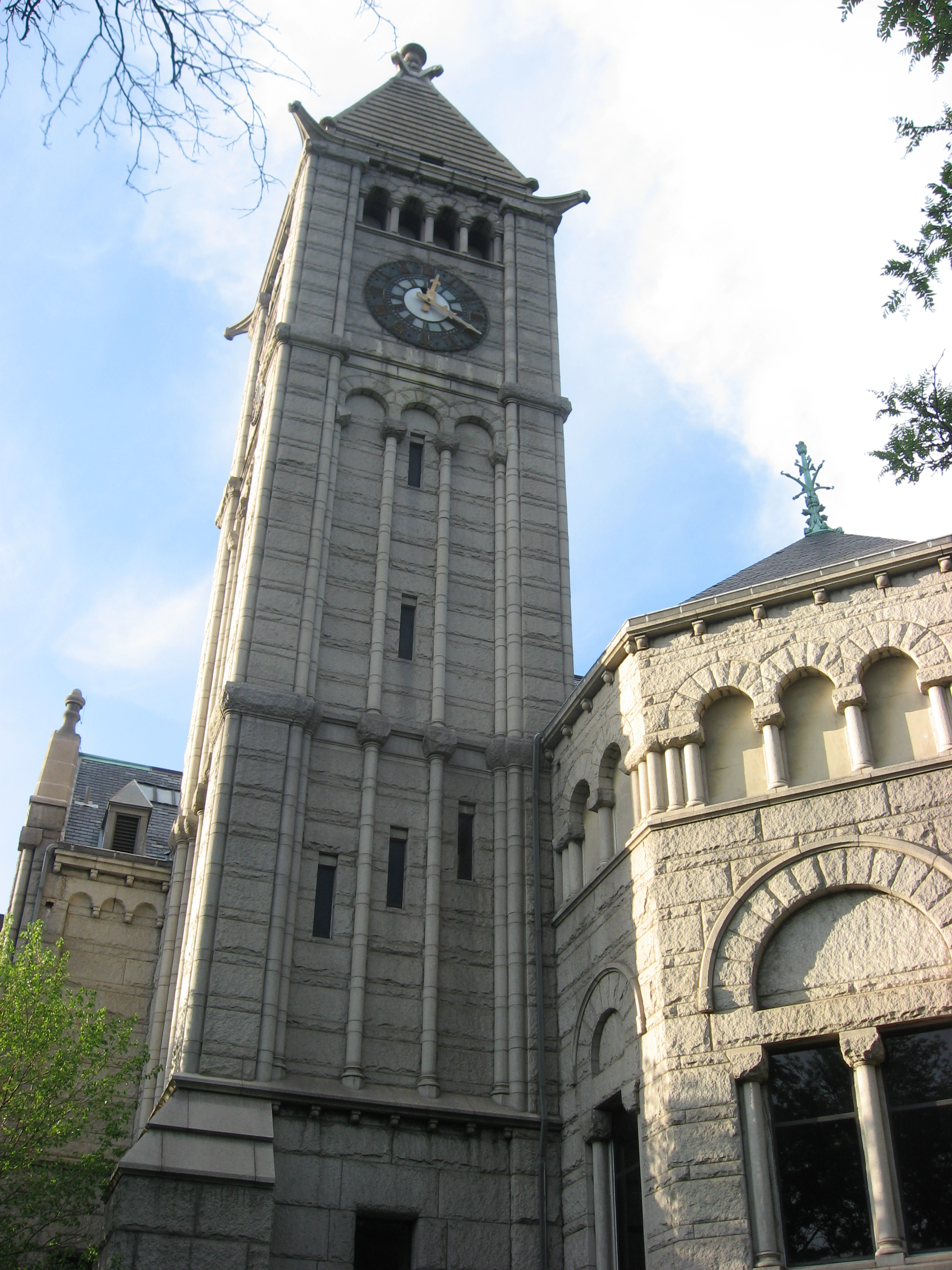
- Carnegie Free Library of Allegheny, built in 1889

- Coordinates: 40.453°N 80.005°W
- Country: United States
- State: Pennsylvania
- County: Allegheny County
- City: Pittsburgh

Area
  - Total: 0.21 sq mi (0.54 km^{2})

Population (2010)
  - Total: 933
  - Density: 4,400/sq mi (1,700/km^{2})

Allegheny Center is a neighborhood on Pittsburgh's North Side. Its zip code is 15212, and it has representation on Pittsburgh City Council by both council members for District 6 (Downtown, North Shore) and District 1 (Northside).

== History ==
In 1783, the Commonwealth of Pennsylvania established a 3000-acre tract of land north of where the Allegheny River merged with the Ohio River. John Redick created an initial town plan for Allegheny City- which featured 36 city blocks surrounded by a common grazing area - the following year. That initial 36-block area is today's Allegheny Center. It is still surrounded on three sides by the former grazing area, now a public park called Allegheny Commons. On either side of this park are the neighborhoods of Allegheny West and East Allegheny.

Because Allegheny City was intended by the Pennsylvania Legislature to serve as the county seat of Allegheny County, the central blocks of Redick's 36-block plan were designed for public uses, including a market house and post office. The main thoroughfare was East Ohio Street, which stretched from Allegheny West through Allegheny Center and then to Allegheny East and beyond.

From the 19th century to 1907, Allegheny Center was thus the hub of downtown Allegheny City. The Children's Museum of Pittsburgh (consisting of the old Allegheny Post Office and Buhl Planetarium joined by a 2006 addition) is located within it, as is the old Carnegie Free Library of Allegheny (now the New Hazlett Theater and the Children's MuseumLab). Allegheny Center is also home to the National Aviary, situated within West Park.

After 1907 (when Pittsburgh annexed Allegheny City), this area continued to be a hub for those residents of what was now Pittsburgh's North Side. But the area deteriorated as: 1) Allegheny's wealthiest residents, who had founded Allegheny Country Club in 1895, moved the club to Sewickley in 1902 and began moving their residences along with it; 2) the Great Depression caused an economic slowdown; and 3) rationing during World War II prevented much investment in the buildings. As one example of the trend, the landmark Boggs & Buhl department store, which had done a thriving business among Allegheny City's wealthy residents, steadily lost money after 1931 and was closed in 1958.

In the 1950s, community leaders discussed how to revitalize the historic hub of Allegheny City and established a modern plan for Allegheny Center. Designed by architects Deeter & Ritchey, it involved a $65 million project by Alcoa Properties, Inc. The construction project razed about 518 buildings (including the Boggs & Buhl department store) - many of them taken by eminent domain - to make way for 2 professional buildings, 4 apartment complexes totaling 840 units, 50 townhouses, a shopping mall, and a 3-acre (12,000 m^{2}) public square. The public square was the object of an international design competition sponsored by the Pittsburgh Urban Redevelopment Authority. The entire Allegheny Redevelopment Area encompasses approximately 79 acres (320,000 m^{2}) on the North Side, about a half-mile from downtown Pittsburgh.

The project converted what had been an open, walkable business district into an enclosed mall called Allegheny Center Mall that had few pedestrian entrances and sat above an underground parking garage. The central portion of East Ohio Street was closed, and drivers were forced to take a new ring road around the mall and the other blocks of Redick's initial plan to proceed east or west.

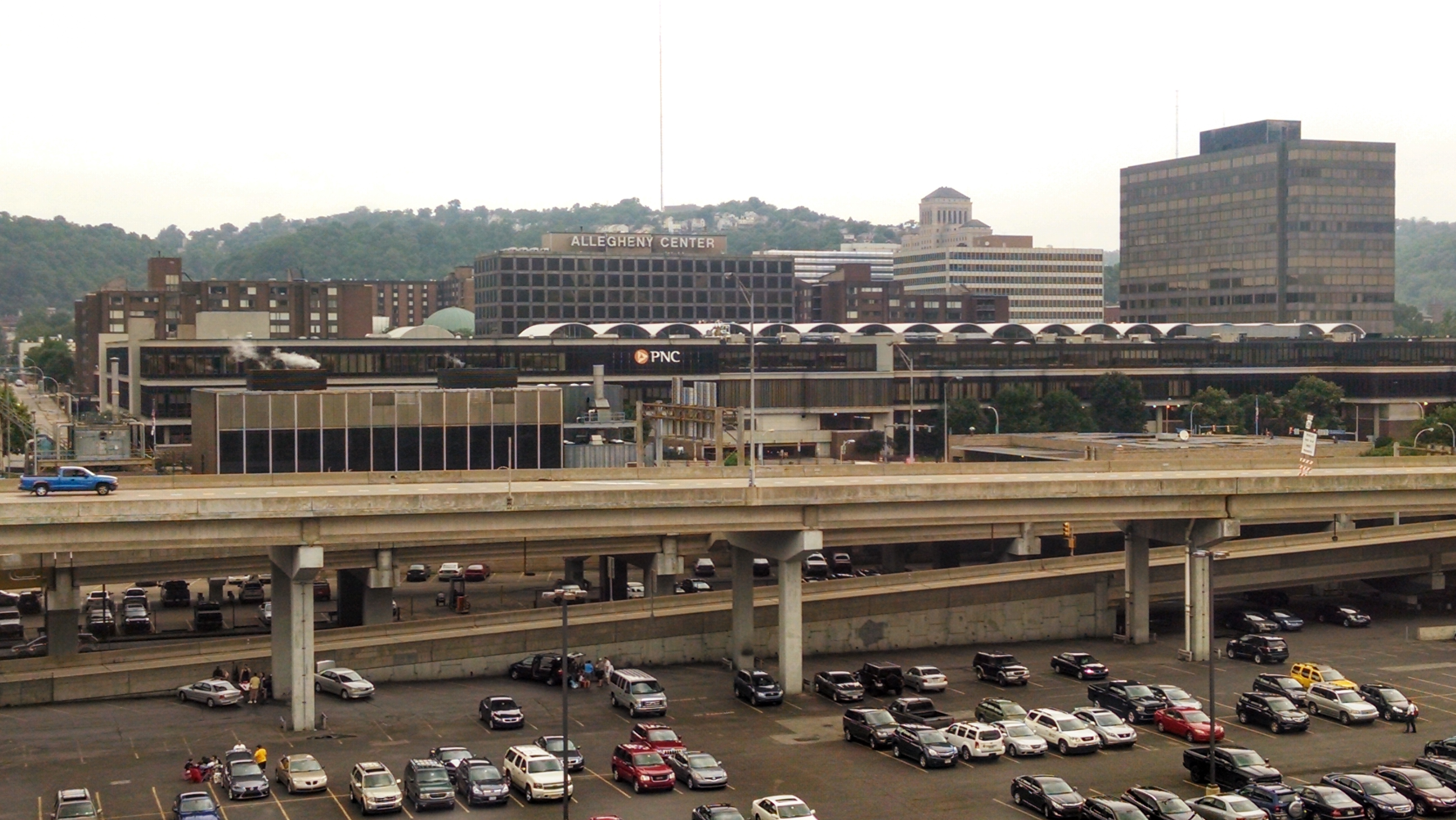
The former Allegheny Center Mall from PNC Park in 2014.

The mall, opened in 1965 and anchored by Sears, F. W. Woolworth Company, and Zayre, had some initial success, but it did not revive the business fortunes of Allegheny City, which continued to decline after Interstate 279 allowed area residents to drive to the northern suburbs to shop.

The mall's stores began closing in the 1990s, and the mall gradually became a successful office complex.

Today, the 36-block area initially planned by John Redick consists of the Allegheny Center Mall - now Nova Place, which contains 1.5 million square feet of Class A office space in the old mall concourse, plus two of the office towers, restaurants, including Federal Galley, a fitness center, and Alloy 26, Pittsburgh's largest coworking space, which is located in the concourse - and several public structures including the Children's Museum of Pittsburgh. A former business district along North Avenue in Central Northside, which deteriorated along with Allegheny Center, is also being revived.

Historical population
Census	Pop.	Note	%±
1940	4,521		—
1950	3,862		−14.6%
1960	2,512		−35.0%
1970	632		−74.8%
1980	1,586		150.9%
1990	1,262		−20.4%
2000	886		−29.8%
2010	933		5.3%
2020	1,419		52.1%

== Surrounding Pittsburgh neighborhoods ==
- Allegheny West
- Central Northside
- East Allegheny
- North Shore

== See also ==
- List of Pittsburgh neighborhoods

== Gallery ==
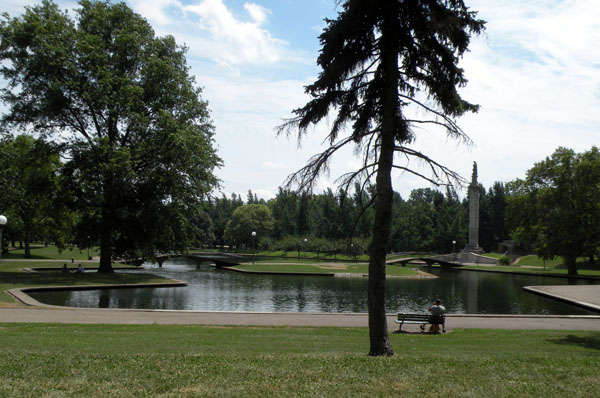
Allegheny Commons Park West Park, dating to 1867.

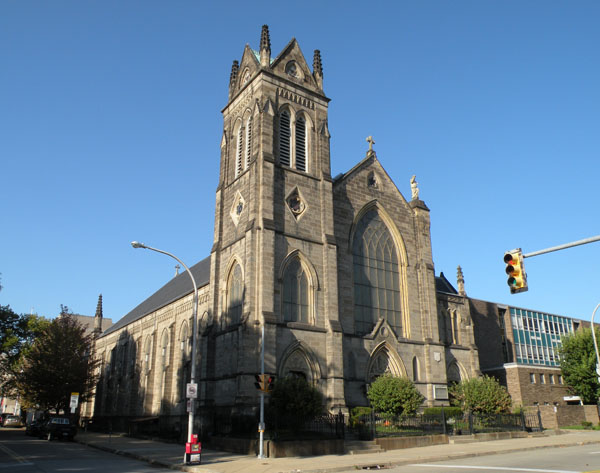
St. Peter's Roman Catholic Church, built in 1874, at 720 Arch Street.

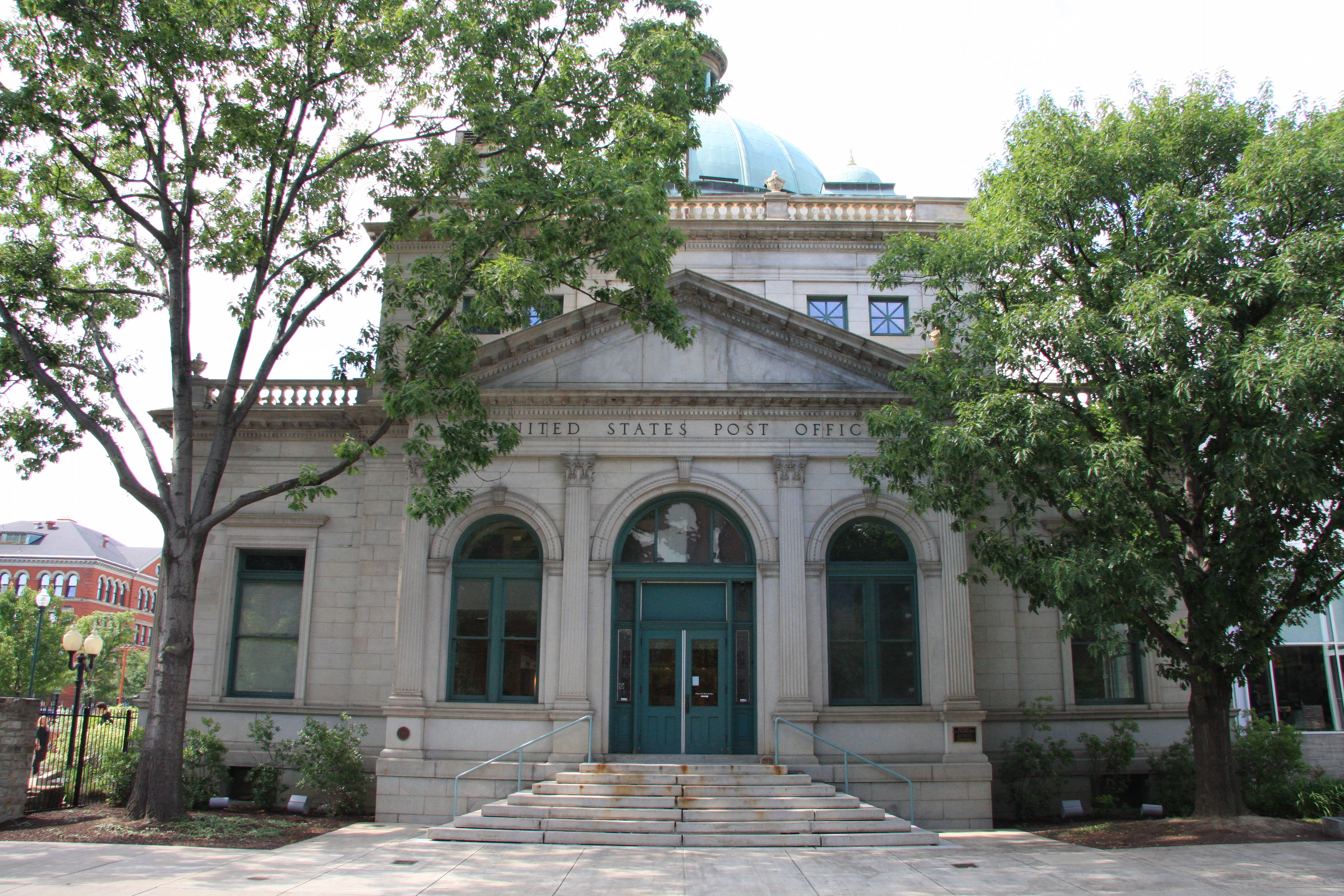
Former Allegheny Post Office (now part of the Children's Museum of Pittsburgh), built in 1897, at 10 Children's Way.

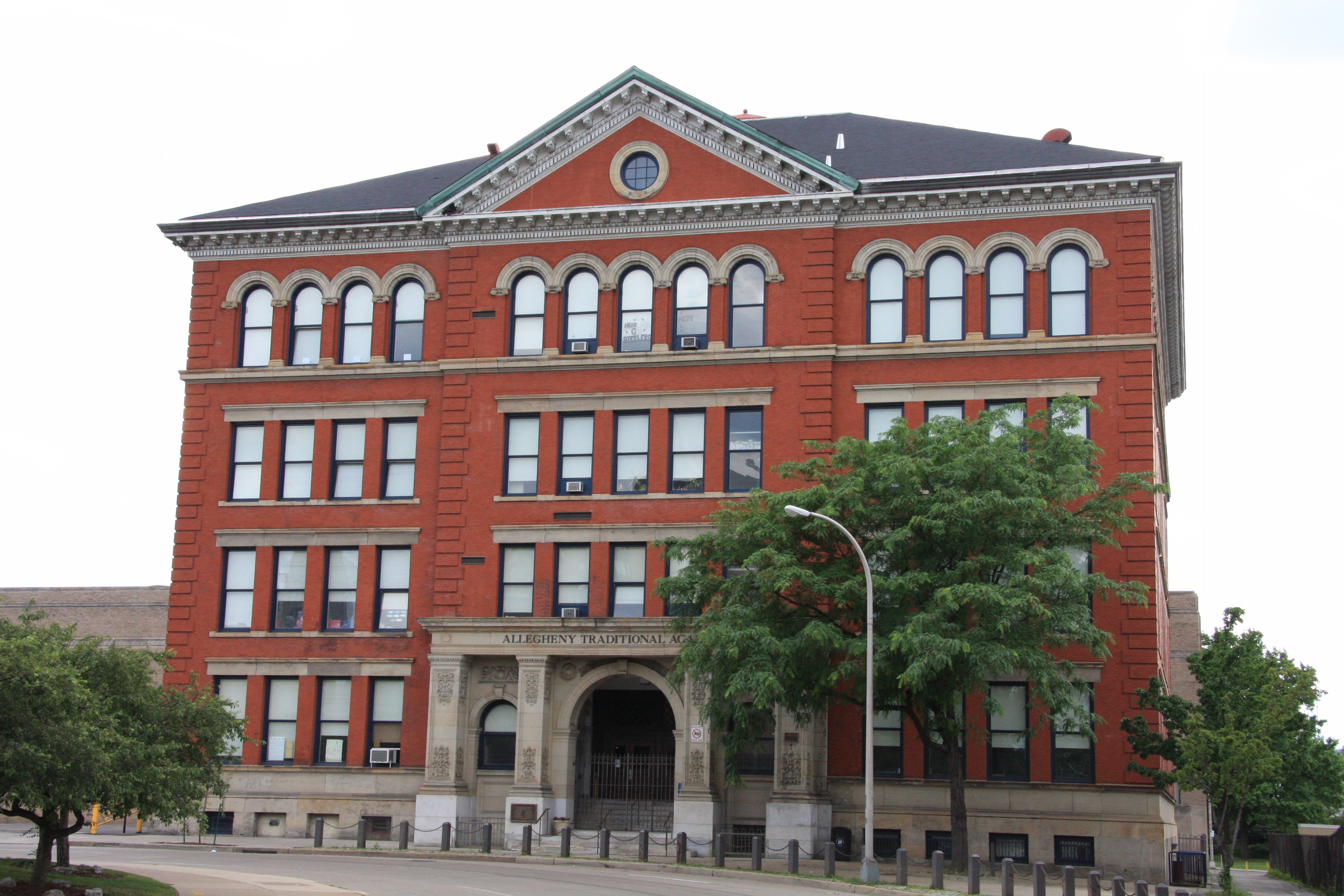
Allegheny High School, built in 1904, at 810 Arch Street.

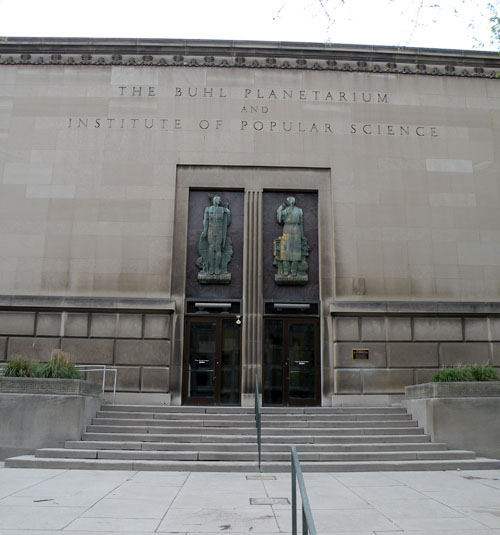
Buhl Planetarium and Institute of Popular Science (now part of the Children's Museum of Pittsburgh), built in 1939, at 10 Children's Way.

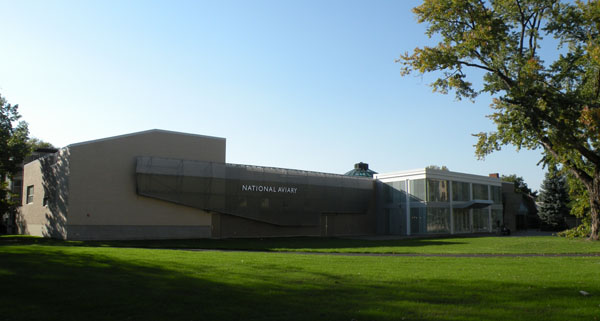
The National Aviary, founded in 1952, at 700 Arch Street.

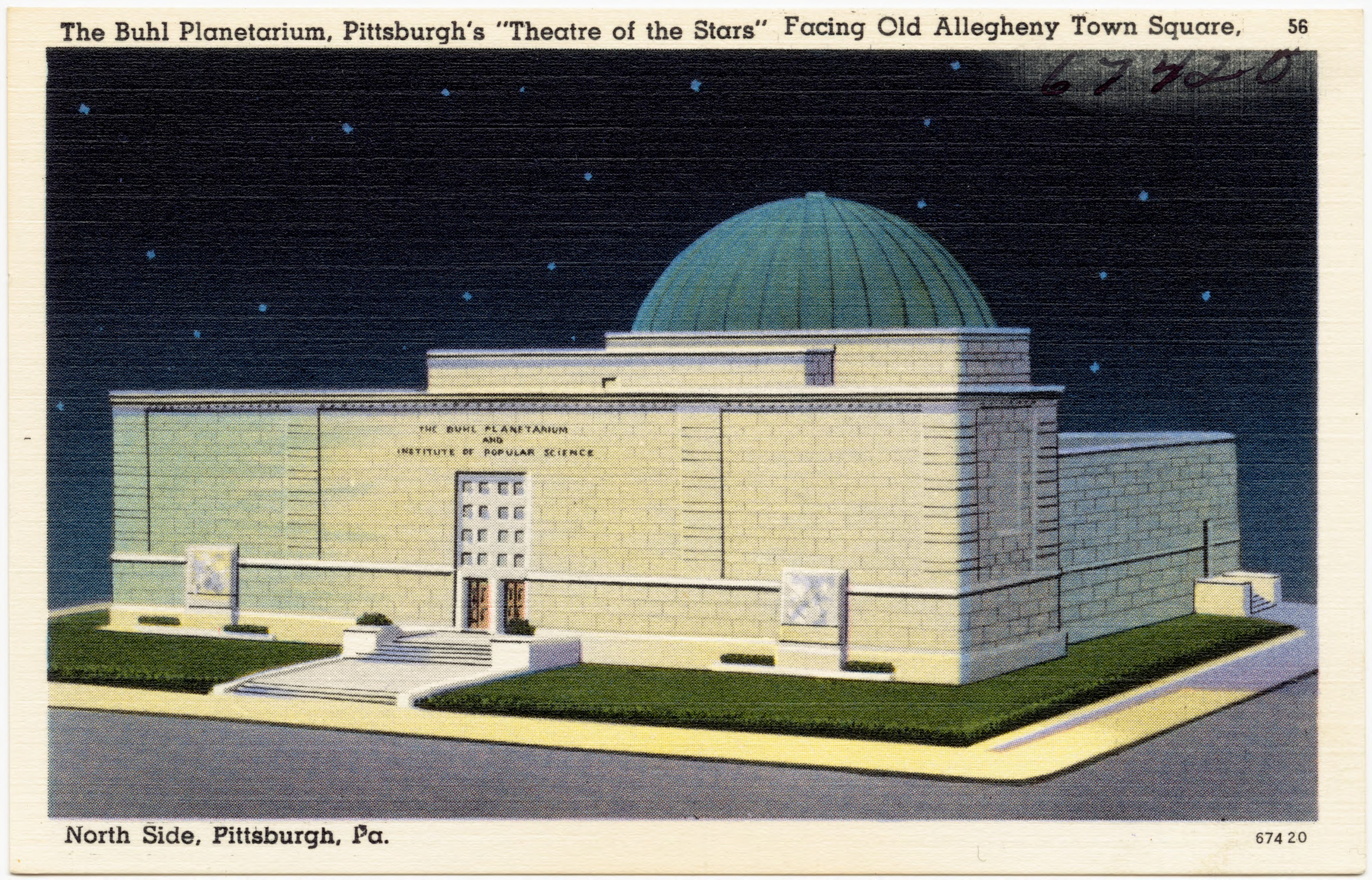
Buhl Planetarium postcard c. 1930s
