= William Robinson Jr. =

American politician

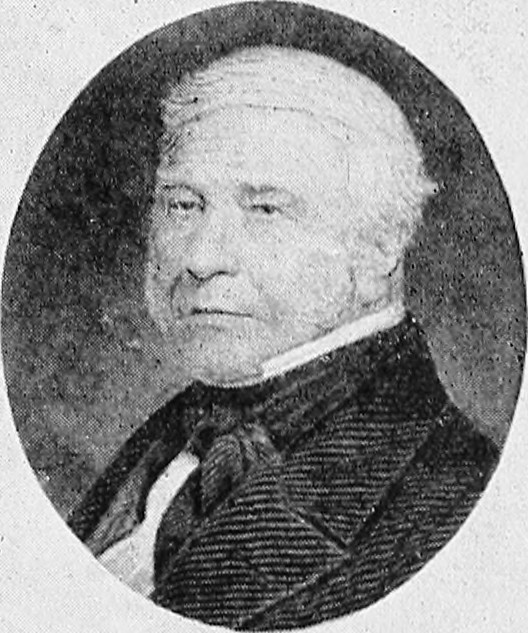
William Robinson Jr.

William Robinson Jr. (17 December 1785 – 25 February 1868) was an American politician, business executive, and militia general active in Allegheny, Pennsylvania, now the North Side of Pittsburgh. He was the first mayor of Allegheny and a state legislator.

== Early life ==
Robinson was born on 17 December 1785 in a log cabin in the area soon to become Allegheny. He was reputedly the first white child born west of the Allegheny River. His parents were James Robinson, who operated a ferry across the river, and Martha Boggs Robinson. William was styled "Junior" to distinguish him from an uncle of the same name. After schooling at Pittsburgh Academy (now the University of Pittsburgh) and Princeton University, he read law under ex-senator James Ross, but did not go on to practice the profession.

In 1806, on a flatboat trip down the Ohio River, the young Robinson and several companions were detained on suspicion of taking part in the Aaron Burr conspiracy to found a Southwestern empire. They were released as nothing treasonous could be proven against them.

== Business ==
Robinson managed a number of companies over his lifetime. He was the first president of the Allegheny Bridge Company, which built a bridge over the Allegheny River at the site of his father's ferry crossing (now the site of Pittsburgh's Roberto Clemente Bridge). Opened in 1819, the bridge was the first to cross the Allegheny at Pittsburgh. Robinson was the first president of the Ohio and Pennsylvania Railroad, which became part of the Pittsburgh, Fort Wayne and Chicago Railway, a major component of the Pennsylvania Railroad system, for which he was a director from 1851 to 1856. He served for 16 years as the first president of the Exchange Bank of Pittsburgh. He was also partner in one of the area's early rolling mills.

== Politics ==
Robinson was elected as a Democrat to the Pennsylvania House of Representatives, serving from 1833 to 1834. When Allegheny borough became a city in 1840, Robinson, then a Whig, became its first mayor. His other positions in the Allegheny government included treasurer, assessor, and president of Select Council. According to one historian, Robinson had a "haughty and dictatorial" manner that hampered his political ambitions.

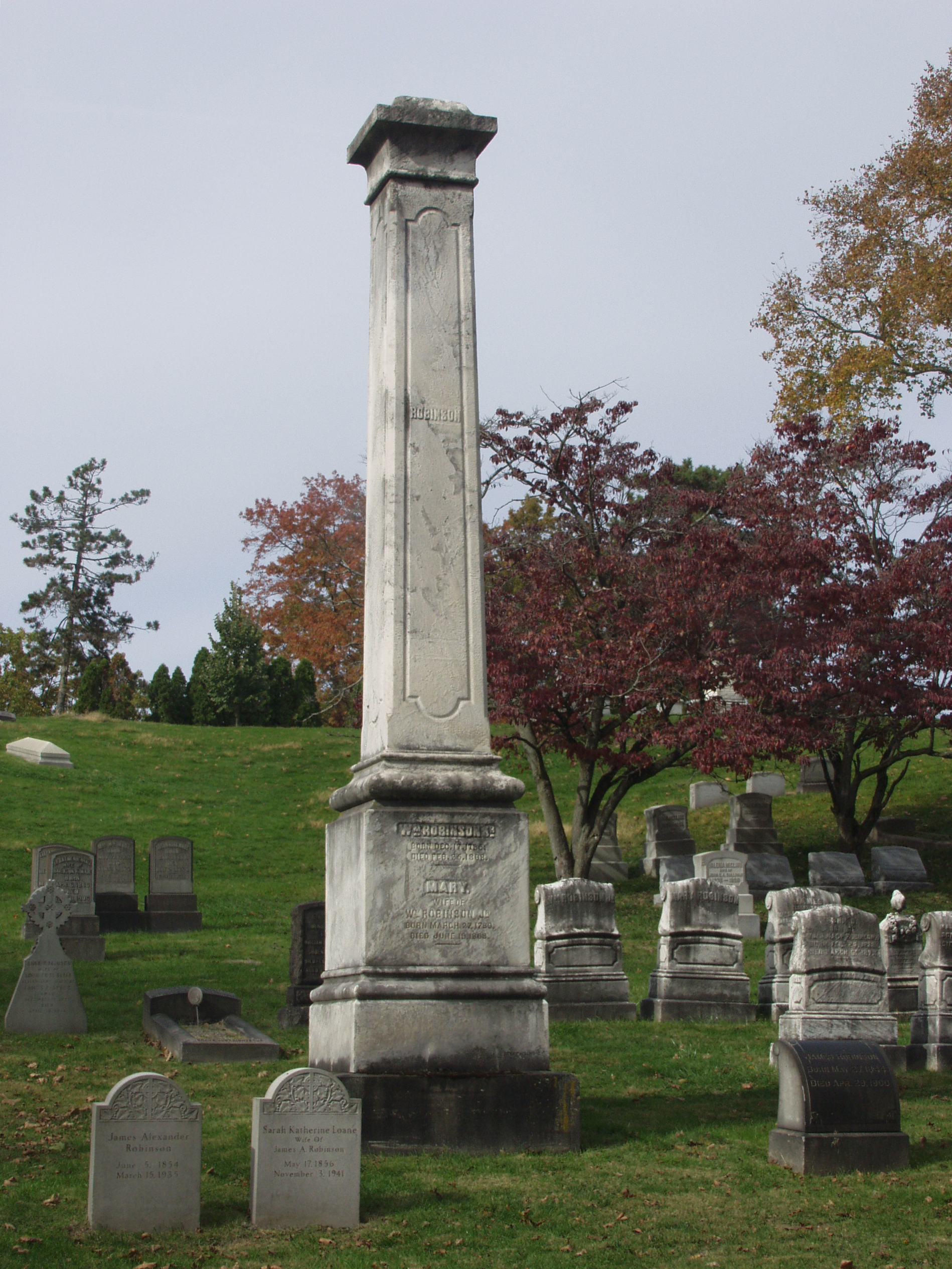
Robinson monument at Allegheny Cemetery

== Mexican War Streets ==
The Mexican War Streets neighborhood, originally called Buena Vista, was established by Robinson on part of his extensive land inheritance from his father. He laid out the plan in 1847 during the Mexican–American War, naming the streets for the war's battles and leaders. Contrary to legend, he saw no active service in the conflict.

== State militia ==
In 1849, Robinson was elected major general of the 18th Division, Pennsylvania Volunteers, resulting in his being known afterward as "General" Robinson. The Volunteers at the time were a more social than military organization.

== Death and legacy ==
Robinson died on 25 February 1868 and was buried at Allegheny Cemetery. He is commemorated on the North Side of Pittsburgh by General Robinson Street, which runs through his father's original farm. At the end of the 20th century, many artifacts from Robinson Jr.'s estate were unearthed at the construction site of PNC Park.

His grandson, John Buchanan Robinson, was a politician who became a member of the Pennsylvania House of Representatives, the Pennsylvania State Senate and the U.S. House of Representatives.

== See also ==
- List of mayors of Allegheny, Pennsylvania
