= Eleanor Hiestand Moore =

American physician and suffragist (1859–1923)

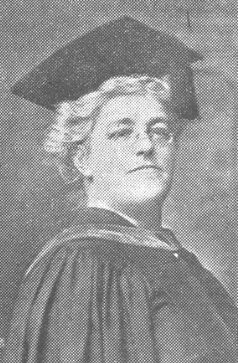
- Eleanor M. Hiestand Moore, from a 1916 publication.
- Born: Eleanor Moore Gill; 20 October 1859; Allegheny, Pennsylvania
- Died: 29 November 1923 (aged 64); Philadelphia
- Other names: Eleanor Moore Hiestand
- Occupations: Physician, writer, suffragist, editor

Eleanor Hiestand Moore (October 20, 1859 – November 29, 1923), born Eleanor Moore Gill, was an American physician, writer, editor, and suffragist. She coined the suffrage slogan "Ballots for Both", to win a 1916 contest.

== Early life and education ==
Eleanor Moore Gill was born in Allegheny, Pennsylvania, the daughter of Samuel Brown Wylie Gill and Ann Eliza Blair Gill. Her father was a lawyer. She attended Vassar College and Bryn Mawr College, and earned a medical degree in 1890, at the Woman's Medical College of Pennsylvania.

== Career ==
Hiestand-Moore (her name was given with and without the hyphen) was assistant editor of the Medical Register from 1887 to 1889. She taught chemistry at the Women's Medical College of Pennsylvania from 1890 to 1895. In 1916, she entered and won a slogan contest sponsored by the National American Woman's Suffrage Association (NAWSA), with "Ballots for Both", which was used on pins in the last years of the American campaign. In 1917 she was mentioned among the prominent Philadelphia suffragists forgoing new shoes as a wartime sacrifice.

"Reform in the Government of Medical Schools" (1896), a report written by Eleanor M. Hiestand-Moore

Hiestand-Moore co-edited Godey's Lady's Book in the 1880s, and wrote short fiction, including "Le Valet du Diable" (1881), in Potter's American Monthly; "Up in the Greenwood Tree" (1884), "A Parisian Idyl" (1884), "Solid for Whom?" (1887), "Con Amore: A Nocturne in Gray" (1887), "The Shears of Atropos" (1887), "Allan's Masquerade" (1887), "When the Ship Comes In" (1888), and "The Wild Irishman" (1888), all in Godey's Lady's Book; "Fu Chow's Lottery", "The Cigarettes of Ishmond", "A Bargain in Ancestors", "Miss Brown's Baggage", and "A Proof of Title", all published in The Pacific Monthly in 1904; and "An Episode in a Motor Car" (1906), also in The Pacific Monthly. Her non-fiction writing included "Something about Tapestry" (1880, Potter's), "The Daily Papers" (1881, Potter's), "Furniture and Furnishing" (1881, Potter's), and "Novelties in Fancy Work" (1882, Godey's).

Heistand-Moore was founder and editor of The Theosophic Voice, a Chicago-based journal representing a faction of American theosophy. She lectured at the Theosophical Society meetings in Chicago, and in other cities.

== Personal life ==
Eleanor Blair married twice. Her first husband was John Howard Hiestand; they married in 1879. Her second husband was William Chestnut Moore; they married in 1892. She died in 1923, aged 64 years, in Philadelphia.
