= Rade Vukmir =

American emergency and critical care Physician

- Born: Center Township, Beaver County, Pennsylvania
- Education: Cornell University; University of Pittsburgh
- Scientific career
- Fields: Emergency Medicine; Intensive care medicine
- Workplaces: Drexel University; University of Pittsburgh; Temple University

Rade B. Vukmir is an emergency critical care and neurocritical care physician. With a career spanning over three decades, he has held positions, including President of Critical Care Medicine Associates, Chief Clinical Officer for National Guardian Risk Retention Group, the ECI PSO (Patient Safety Organization), and Chairman of ECI Healthcare Partners Education and Risk Management Department. He is recognized as a Fellow of the American College of Emergency Physicians (ACEP), American College of Chest Physicians, and the American College of Healthcare Executives. His work includes the authorship of 43 peer-reviewed medical journal articles, numerous book chapters and eleven books. Currently, he is a clinical professor at the Drexel University a position previously at University of Pittsburgh and Temple University.

== Biography ==
Born in Center Township, Pennsylvania, he is the first of two children to steelworkers Leni and Matthew. Early signs of his interest in science and medicine emerged when he became a Buhl Planetarium and Institute of Popular Science Scholar at the age of six. Vukmir attended Cornell University and graduated with a BS in biology from the University of Pittsburgh in 1981.

== Career ==
Vukmir's professional journey began with summers in the blooming mill and blast furnace, echoing his family's industrial background. After graduating from the University of Pittsburgh medical school in 1986, he entered Emergency Medicine, later pursuing critical care expertise at the University of Pittsburgh.

His career includes roles as the first Emergency Medicine-based Critical Care physician, ICU Gatekeeper, and Chair of the Resuscitation Committee.

Beyond academia, Vukmir ventured into law, earning a Juris Doctor in 1999 with additional certification in health law. He contributed to disaster management as a member of the federal emergency medicine Disaster Medical Assistance Team and the critical care Multi-Specialty Evaluation Team (MSET).

== Personal and public image ==
Vukmir's leadership includes founding and chairing the Critical Care Medicine Section within the American College of Emergency Physicians in 1997. He served on ACEP committees, contributing to medicolegal and communications initiatives. Acknowledged with two Emergency Medicine Faculty of the Year awards, Vukmir maintained academic positions at the University of Pittsburgh, Temple, and Drexel University.

== Bibliography ==
Vukmir published his book The Mills narrate the life in an American steel town, particularly the Jones and Laughlin Steel Company, drawing from personal experience and interviews.

== Enterprise ==
In 1997, Vukmir joined Emergency Consultants Inc. (ECI) as a Regional Director, later becoming Chairman of Education and Risk Management. He served as Chief Clinical Officer for National Guardian Risk Retention Group and ECI Reinsurance. His contributions extended to the development of the first ACCME accredited web-based continuing medical education program in 2006.

In 2011, Vukmir assumed the role of Chief Clinical Officer for the ECI Patient Safety Organization, the first federally chartered emergency medicine quality organization. He continued to contribute to the critical care community as the National Corporate ICU Director and later served as Vice President of Medical Affairs for the Alzheimer's Association, coordinating scientific, research, and clinical strategies.

== Selected publications ==
=== Journals ===
- Vukmir, Rade B; Bircher, Nicholas; Safar, Peter (March 1996). "Sodium bicarbonate in cardiac arrest: A reappraisal". The American Journal of Emergency Medicine. 14 (2): 192–206. doi:10.1016/S0735-6757(96)90133-3. PMID 8924147.
- Vukmir, Rade B (March 2004). "The influence of urban, suburban, or rural locale on survival from refractory prehospital cardiac arrest". The American Journal of Emergency Medicine. 22 (2): 90–93. doi:10.1016/j.ajem.2003.12.008. PMID 15011220.
- Vukmir, R B (1 January 2004). "Prehospital cardiac arrest outcome is adversely associated with antiarrythmic agent use, but not associated with presenting complaint or medical history". Emergency Medicine Journal. 21 (1): 95–98. doi:10.1136/emj.2003.006445. PMC 1756380. PMID 14734394.
- Vukmir, Rade B. (January 2005). "Association of obesity with worsened prehospital cardiac arrest". Journal of Nutritional & Environmental Medicine. 15 (1): 1–8. doi:10.1080/13590840500191596.
- Vukmir, Rade B.; Katz, Laurence (March 2006). "Sodium bicarbonate improves outcome in prolonged prehospital cardiac arrest". The American Journal of Emergency Medicine. 24 (2): 156–161. doi:10.1016/j.ajem.2005.08.016. PMID 16490643.
- Vukmir, Rade B. (June 2008). "The Outcome of Cardiac Dysfunction in Critically Ill Trauma Patients: Myocardial Contusion Complicated by Refractory Hypotension". European Journal of Trauma and Emergency Surgery. 34 (3): 261–266. doi:10.1007/s00068-007-7062-0. PMID 26815747. S2CID 195227650.
- Vukmir, Rade B. (January 2009). "Initial Cardiac Rhythm Correlated to Emergency Department Survival". Clinical Medicine. Cardiology. 3: 9–14. doi:10.4137/cmc.s695. PMC 2872586. PMID 20508762.
- Vukmir, Rade B.; Howell, Randy N. (1 December 2010). "Emergency medicine provider efficiency: the learning curve, equilibration and point of diminishing returns". Emergency Medicine Journal. 27 (12): 916–920. doi:10.1136/emj.2009.079194. PMID 21076164.

== See also ==
- Jones and Laughlin Steel Company
