= Allegheny, Pennsylvania =

Former city in the United States (1788–1907)

Allegheny City
- Former city
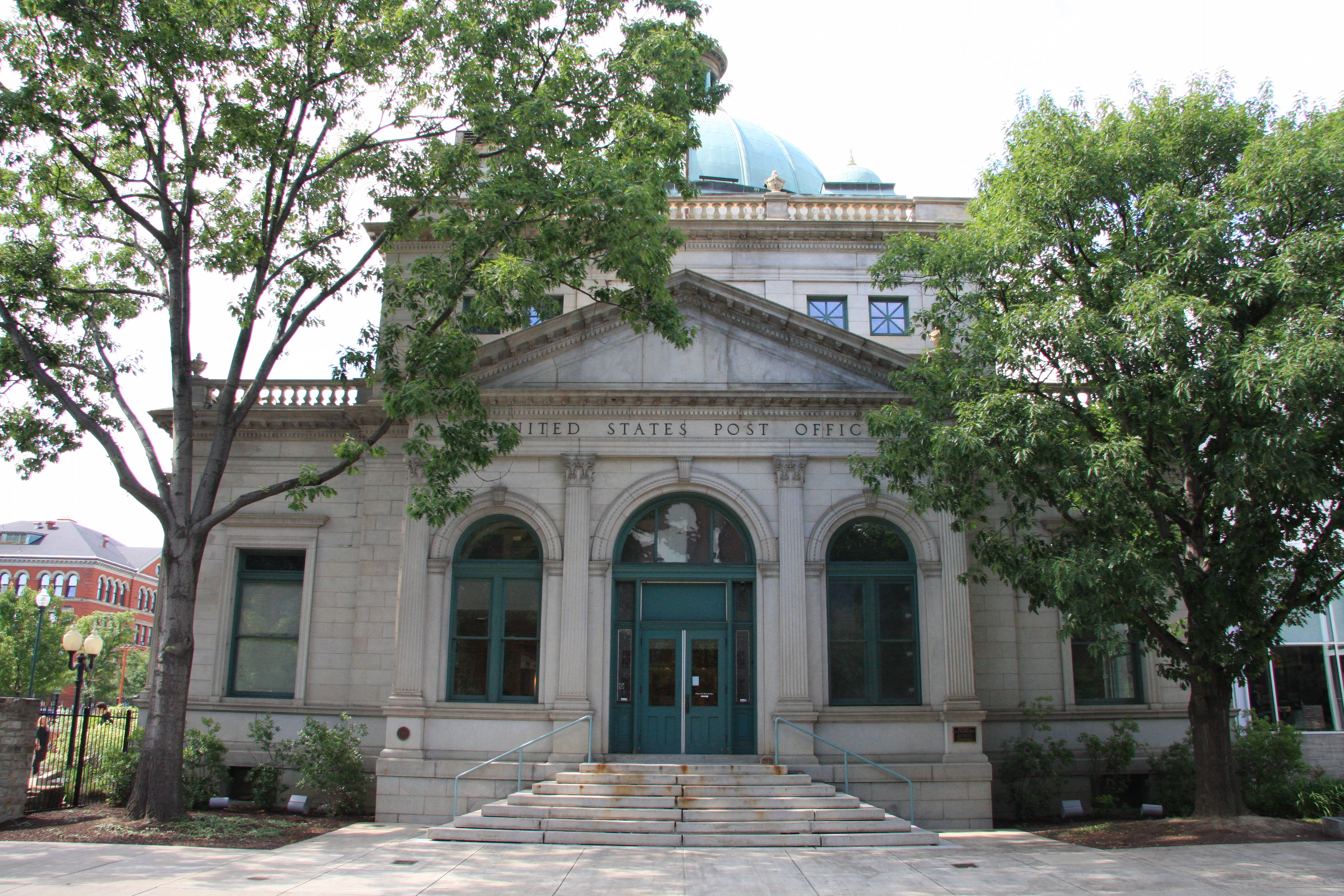
- The Allegheny Post Office, one of the remaining structures of Allegheny City's downtown

- Location within Pennsylvania Location within the United States
- Coordinates: 40°26′30″N 80°00′00″W
- Country: United States
- State: Pennsylvania
- County: Allegheny
- Founded: 1788
- Incorporated (borough): 1828
- Incorporated (city): 1840
- Annexed (Pittsburgh): 1907
- Elevation: 1,370 ft (420 m)

Population (1900)
  - Total: 129,896
- Time zone: UTC-5 (EST)
  - Summer (DST): UTC-4 (EDT)
- ZIP Code: 15212, 15214, 15233
- Area code: 412

Allegheny City was a municipality that existed in the U.S. state of Pennsylvania from 1788 until it was annexed by Pittsburgh in 1907. It was located north across the Allegheny River from downtown Pittsburgh, with its southwest border formed by the Ohio River, and is known as the North Side. The city's waterfront district, along the Allegheny and Ohio rivers, became Pittsburgh's North Shore neighborhood.

The boundary of Allegheny City encompassed the modern Pittsburgh neighborhoods of Allegheny Center, Allegheny West, Brighton Heights, California-Kirkbride, Central Northside, Chateau, East Allegheny, Fineview, Manchester, Marshall-Shadeland, North Shore, Perry South, Spring Hill–City View, and Troy Hill; most of Perry North; and parts of Northview Heights and Spring Garden.

== History ==
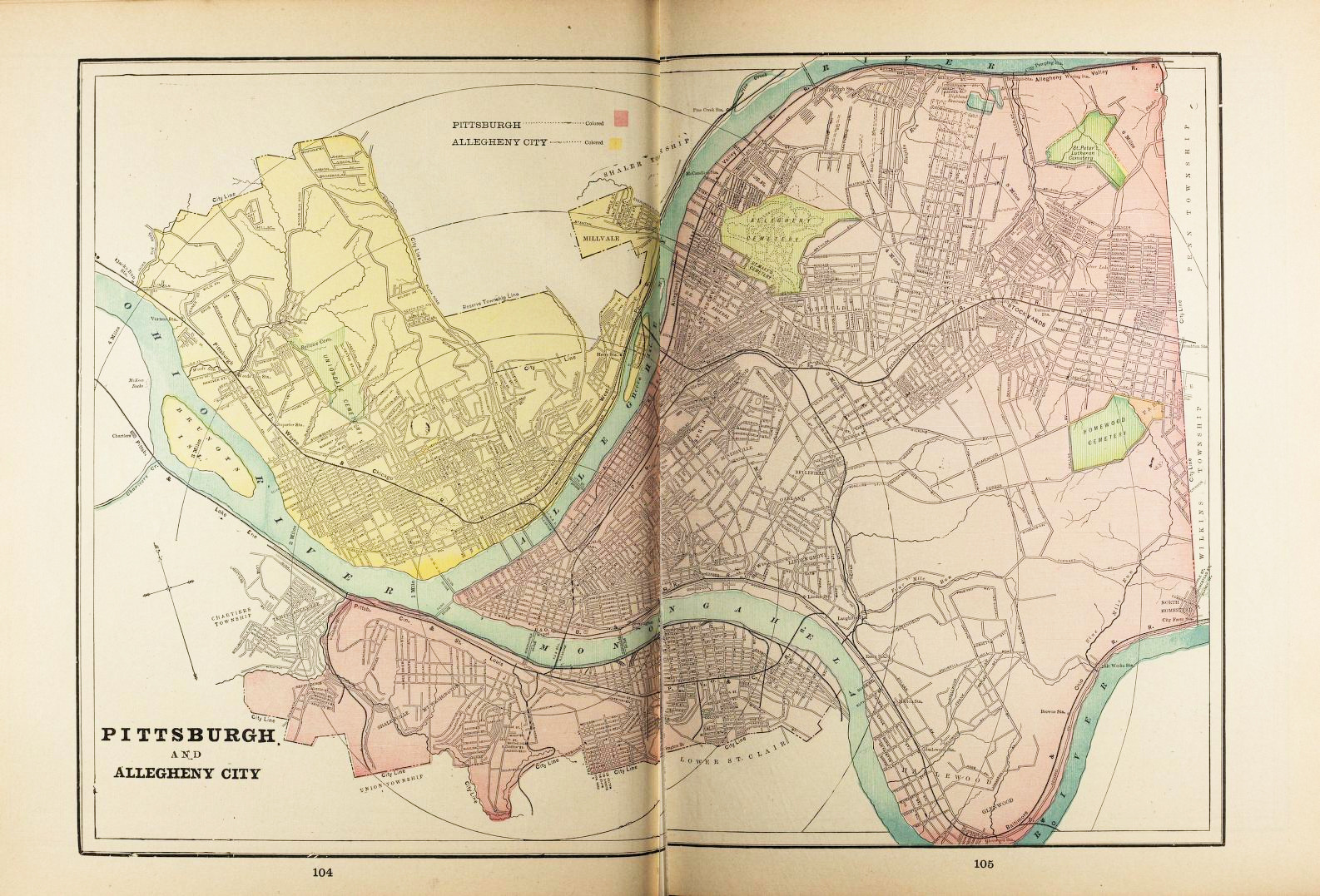
An 1898 map featuring Allegheny and adjoining Millvale (in yellow), Pittsburgh (in red), and parks (in green)

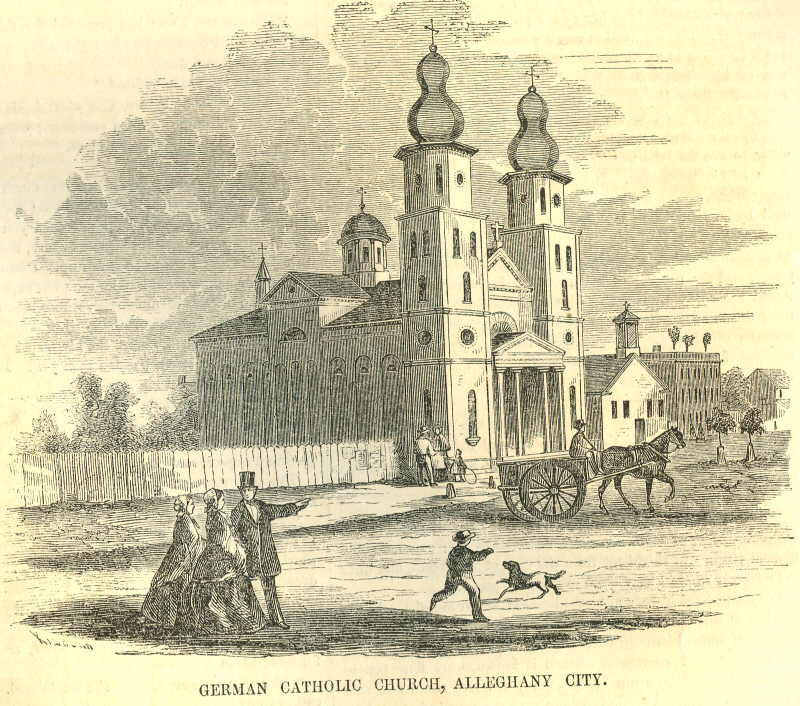
German Catholic Church in Allegheny in 1857

Historical population
Census	Pop.	Note	%±
1830	2,801		—
1840	10,089		260.2%
1850	21,262		110.7%
1860	28,702		35.0%
1870	53,180		85.3%
1880	78,682		48.0%
1890	105,287		33.8%
1900	129,896		23.4%
1910	132,283		1.8%

Allegheny was laid out in 1788 according to a plan by John Redick. The lots were sold in Philadelphia by Pennsylvania's state government or given as payment to Revolutionary War veterans. It was incorporated as a borough in 1828 and as a city in 1840. Prior to the 1850s, most of the area was still largely farmland, but was subdivided into residential lots, first for the growing German population and later for Croat immigrants. It was commonly referred to as "Deutschtown", derived from the German word Deutsch, referring to the language and ethnicity.

Allegheny annexed adjoining municipalities such as the boroughs of Manchester, Spring Garden and Duquesne, and the areas that became Brighton Heights, Observatory Hill, Perry Hilltop, Summer Hill, Spring Hill and Troy Hill.

The annexation of Allegheny by Pittsburgh began with voting in favor of a "Greater Pittsburg" in a special election held on June 12, 1906 and was effected on December 9, 1907, in the wake of the U.S. Supreme Court's landmark decision Hunter v. City of Pittsburgh handed down on November 19 that year. It was approved by the federal government in 1911. The annexation was controversial at the time, as an overwhelming majority of Allegheny City residents were opposed to the merger. Previous Pennsylvania law had directed that a majority of the voters in each merging municipality had to approve an annexation agreement. In 1906, the State Assembly passed a new law that authorized annexations if a majority of the total voters in both combined municipalities approved the merger. The annexation was rejected by the residents of Allegheny City by a 2:1 margin, but was approved by much more populous Pittsburgh residents, and the annexation bill passed into law. Allegheny City residents tried unsuccessfully for years to have the annexation overturned in court.

The population of Pittsburgh rose from 321,616 in 1900 to 533,905 in 1910, which included the 132,283 who lived in Allegheny in 1910, when the last separate census of Allegheny was taken.

When the two cities were joined, both of the old ward systems were discarded. A new ward system was established made up of 27 wards. In the new ward system, Allegheny was divided into wards 21 to 27. Its past territory is easily seen by viewing a map of the city wards.

In the 1960s, Pittsburgh undertook a massive urban redevelopment project that demolished the historic core of Allegheny City, leaving only the Commons of Allegheny Center and its surrounding neighborhoods. The Carnegie Library, the Old Post Office Building, and the Buhl Planetarium buildings were not demolished. Major portions of the neighborhoods of Allegheny West, Manchester, Central Northside, California-Kirkbride (Old Allegheny Rows), and East Allegheny are listed on the National Register of Historic Places, including the Mexican War Streets in Central Northside.

== Industry ==
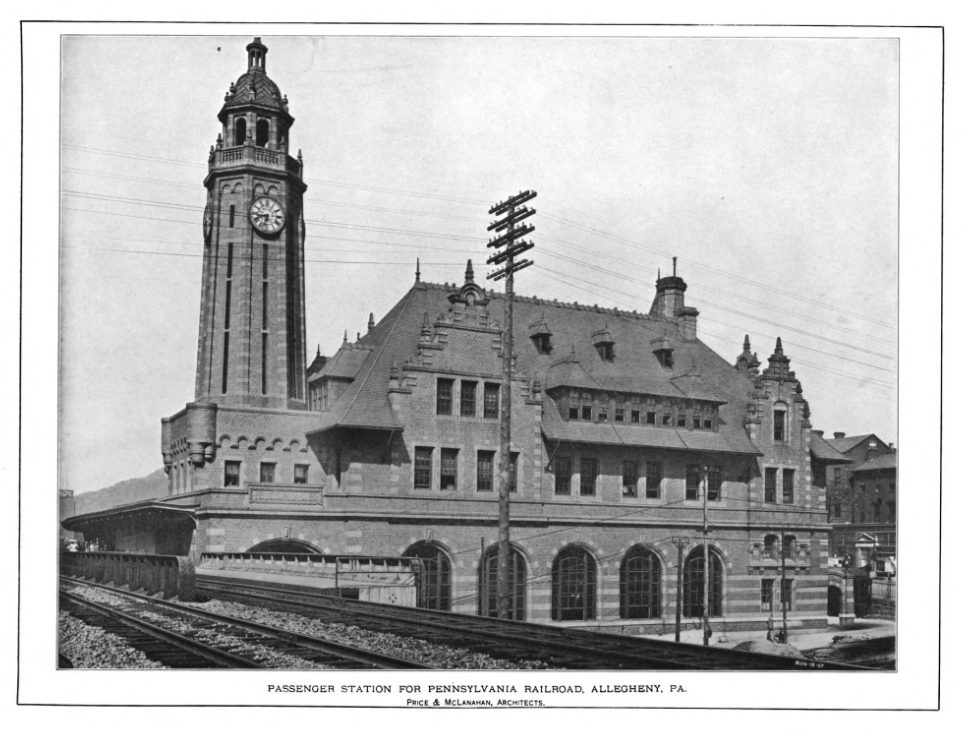
Federal Street Station

Allegheny was an industrial city and had numerous commercial areas, churches, and social organizations, packing houses, tanneries, soap factories and glue factories that provided opportunities for employment to the primarily German immigrants who settled there. The H.J. Heinz Company built its factory in Allegheny City, close to the Chestnut Street bridge (this has been replaced by the 16th Street Bridge). Heyl & Patterson Inc., a manufacturer of railcar dumpers and ship unloaders, also established a factory in Allegheny City. The surviving structures are now occupied by a furniture warehouse and a bus garage.

By the middle of the 19th century, the "Made in Allegheny" label could be found not only on basic iron but on rope, plows, cotton cloth, wool, food, paper, paint, steam engines, wagons and carts, meat, soap, candles, lumber, linseed oil, furniture and a host of other diversified products. Railroad lines were built along the north side of the Allegheny for the Pittsburgh, Fort Wayne and Chicago and the Pittsburgh, Cincinnati, Chicago and St. Louis Railroad railroads in Allegheny. When workers in Pittsburgh struck against the Pennsylvania Railroad after wage cuts in July 1877, railroad workers on these lines also went on strike.

== Historic places ==
=== Teutonia Männerchor ===
The Teutonia Männerchor Hall in the East Allegheny (Deutschtown) neighborhood of Pittsburgh, Pennsylvania, is a building constructed in 1888. It was listed on the National Register of Historic Places in 2004. The Teutonia Männerchor is a private membership club with the purpose of furthering choral singing, German cultural traditions and good fellowship. The club features a number of heritage activities and celebrations, including choral singing in German and folk dancing.

=== The Priory ===
The Priory is the name for two historic landmarks – the 1852 St. Mary's German Catholic Church and the adjacent 1888 home for Bavarian Benedictine priests and brothers. Once a largely German parish, the church later merged with nearby Italian and Polish congregations. The church and rectory have since closed. The buildings are operated as a banquet hall and a bed-and-breakfast.

=== Penn Brewery ===
Although Penn Brewery began in 1987, it is housed in the old Eberhardt & Ober Brewery (1882–1906) buildings. Penn Brewery makes the award-winning Penn Pilsner and a number of other specialty beers. The "tied house" (brewery owned restaurant) features a full German menu and live music.

=== Saint Nicholas Church ===
Saint Nicholas Croatian Catholic Church, nestled in the hillside above the Allegheny River, was the first Croatian Church built in the United States. The structure was razed in January 2013.

=== Ridge Avenue Neighborhood ===
Ridge Avenue, in its heyday between 1890 and 1910, was known as "Millionaires' Row". After 20 years, the area began to decline as some residents moved further out. The entire North Side community began to fray after having been annexed by Pittsburgh in 1907.

=== Mexican War Streets ===
In the late 19th century, Allegheny became known for its stately homes, occupied by some of the area's wealthy families. One such area became known as The Mexican War Streets.

The Mexican War Streets were laid out in 1847 by William Robinson Jr., who had earlier been mayor of the city of Allegheny. Robinson, who contrary to some popular tellings did not actually serve in the Mexican War, subdivided his land and named the new streets after the battles and generals (Buena Vista Street, Filson Way, Monterey Street, Palo Alto Street, Resaca Place, Sherman Avenue, Taylor Avenue) of that war.

=== Carnegie Free Public Libraries ===
Through his foundation matching fund, Andrew Carnegie contributed to the financing and construction of the Carnegie Free Library of Allegheny in Allegheny City.

=== St. Anthony Chapel ===
Built on Troy Hill between 1880 and 1892 by Father Suitbert Mollinger, the chapel houses the largest collection of religious relics outside of the Vatican and features life sized Stations of the Cross statues.

=== Ballparks ===
Allegheny was the location of Exposition Park and Recreation Park, which were the earliest home fields of the Pittsburgh Pirates professional baseball team (founded as the Allegheny Base Ball Club). On the North Side of Pittsburgh today are PNC Park, home of the Pittsburgh Pirates, and Acrisure Stadium (formerly Heinz Field), home of the Pittsburgh Steelers. These facilities replaced Three Rivers Stadium, which was the shared home of both teams.

=== Felix Brunot Mansion ===
The Felix Brunot mansion on Stockton Avenue was once used as a station on the Underground Railroad. Fugitive slaves from the South stopped here for food and shelter. While Pennsylvania was a free state, many slaves continued to Canada to gain more distance from slavecatchers.

=== Allegheny Observatory ===
The original Allegheny Observatory was built in 1859 near Perrysville Avenue, by prominent Allegheny citizens who formed the Allegheny Telescope Association. The association donated the observatory to the Western University of Pennsylvania (now the University of Pittsburgh) in 1867, after which it was used for astrophysical, solar, and planetary studies. The observatory maintained a successful subscription time service to railroads via telegraph for many years. A new Allegheny Observatory was built between 1900 and 1912 in today's Riverview Park. It is owned and operated by the University of Pittsburgh for education, astronomical research, and public lectures and tours.

== Notable people ==
- Dwight Edward Aultman (1872–1929), born in Allegheny City, brigadier general, veteran of Spanish American War, WWI, commander of Camp Knox and Fort Sill
- Nellie Bly (1864–1922), journalist, industrialist, inventor, and charity worker
- John A. Brashear (1840–1920), scientific instrument engineer
- Andrew Carnegie (1835–1919), Scottish native immigrated to Allegheny City at age 13, steel industrialist and philanthropist
- Alexander Cassatt (1839–1906), born in Allegheny City on December 8, 1839, executive of Pennsylvania Railroad and brother of artist Mary Cassatt
- Mary Cassatt (1844–1926), born in Allegheny City on May 22, 1844, impressionist painter and printmaker
- Willa Cather (1873–1947), novelist, taught English at Allegheny High School 1903–1906
- David L. Clark (1864–1939), founder of Allegheny City candy manufacturer D. L. Clark Company, maker of the Clark Bar
- Alexander Gilmore Cochran (1846–1928), born in Allegheny City, Democratic member of the U.S. House of Representatives from Pennsylvania
- William Henry Conley (1840–1897), born in Allegheny City, steel industrialist, first president of the Watch Tower Bible and Tract Society, co-founder of the Jehovah's Witnesses religious group
- Stanley Fields (1883–1941), actor, born in Allegheny City
- Mary Porter Gamewell (1848–1906), American missionary to China
- Lillian Burkhart Goldsmith (1871–1958), Los Angeles real estate developer and lecturer
- Martha Graham (1894–1991), born in Allegheny City on May 11, 1894, modern dancer and choreographer
- Kate Harrington (1831–1917), born in Allegheny City, teacher, writer, and poet
- George Washington Harris (1814–1869), born in Allegheny City, steamboat captain and noted humorist, including the "Sut Lovingood" stories
- Frederick Orrin Hartman (1868–1938), third baseman in Major League Baseball
- Eleanor Hiestand Moore (1859–1923), suffragist, writer, editor, physician
- Elijah Hise (1802–1867), born in Allegheny City, lawyer, judge, and United States Congressman from Kentucky
- Robinson Jeffers (1887–1963), poet known for his epic poetry
- Samuel Pierpoint Langley (1834–1906), aviation pioneer, astrophysicist
- Mary A. Miller (1837–1925), editor and publisher of Methodist Protestant Church missionary periodicals
- Dwight Morrow (1873–1931), moved to Allegheny City at age 2, banker/diplomat
- Henry Phipps, Jr. (1839–1930), moved to Allegheny as a child, financier/philanthropist
- John Pitcairn (1841–1916) Scottish-American industrialist who founded PPG Industries; emigrated to Allegheny City at age 5
- William Plankinton (1843–1905), businessman
- Mary Roberts Rinehart (1876–1958), mystery author, born in Allegheny City
- John Buchanan Robinson (1846–1933), politician, born in Allegheny City
- William Robinson, Jr., (1785–1868), politician, businessman and militia general, first mayor of Allegheny City
- Art Rooney (1901–1988), founding owner of the Pittsburgh Steelers franchise of National Football League
- Charles Taze Russell (1852–1916), born in Allegheny City, first president of the Watch Tower Bible and Tract Society, founder of the Bible Students, a branch of which became the Jehovah's Witnesses after his death
- George E. Smith or "Pittsburgh Phil" (1862–1905), 1870s resident, noted gambler and Thoroughbred owner
- John M. Snowden (1776–1845), mayor of Pittsburgh City 1825–1828
- Leo Stein (1872–1947), born in Allegheny City on May 11, 1872, art collector and critic
- Gertrude Stein (1874–1946), born in Allegheny City on February 2, 1874, American avant-garde writer
- Harry Todd (1863–1935), actor, born in Allegheny City
- Ellwood J. Turner (1886–1948), Pennsylvania state representative from Delaware County (1925–1948), speaker of Pennsylvania House of Representatives (1939–1941)
- Lois Weber (1879–1939), born in Allegheny City, pioneer silent film actor, screenwriter, producer, and director

== See also ==
- List of mayors of Allegheny, Pennsylvania
