= Buhl Planetarium and Institute of Popular Science Building =

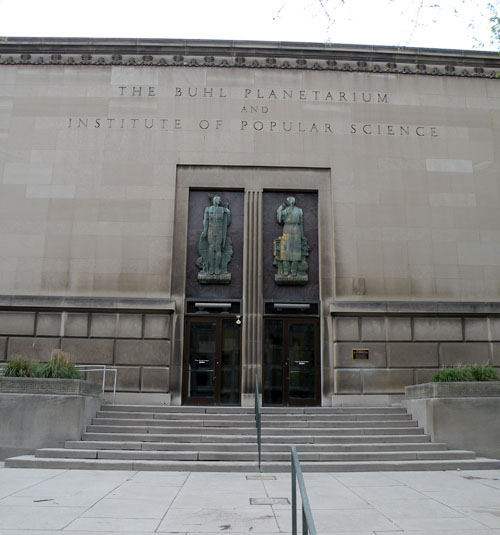

- Location within Pittsburgh
- 40°27′10.44″N 80°0′23.04″W
- Location: 10 Children's Way (Allegheny Center), Pittsburgh, Pennsylvania, USA

History
- Built: 1939

Site notes
- Governing body: Children's Museum of Pittsburgh

The Buhl Planetarium and Institute of Popular Science Building, also known as the "People's Observatory", is located at 10 Children's Way in the Allegheny Center neighborhood of Pittsburgh, Pennsylvania.

== Construction and opening ==
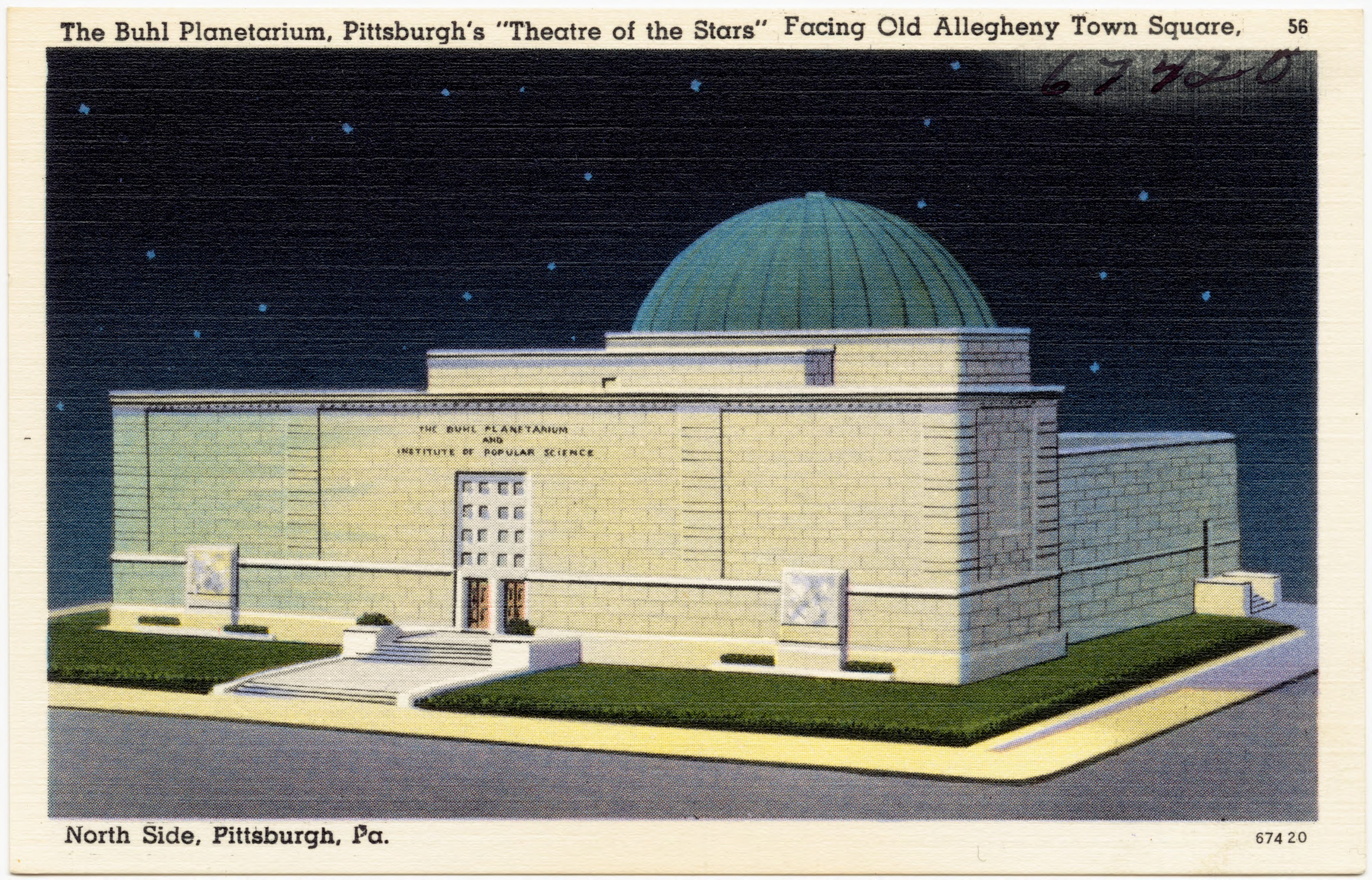
The Buhl Planetarium.

The planetarium opened on October 24, 1939, and was the fifth major planetarium in the United States. The Buhl Foundation completely funded the construction and furnishing of the Buhl Planetarium and Institute of Popular Science building at a cost of $1.07 million.

The building was named after Henry Buhl, Jr. and was designed by architects Ingham, Pratt & Boyd in the "stripped Classical style" and featured an octagonal copper dome that housed the projector.

== Equipment ==
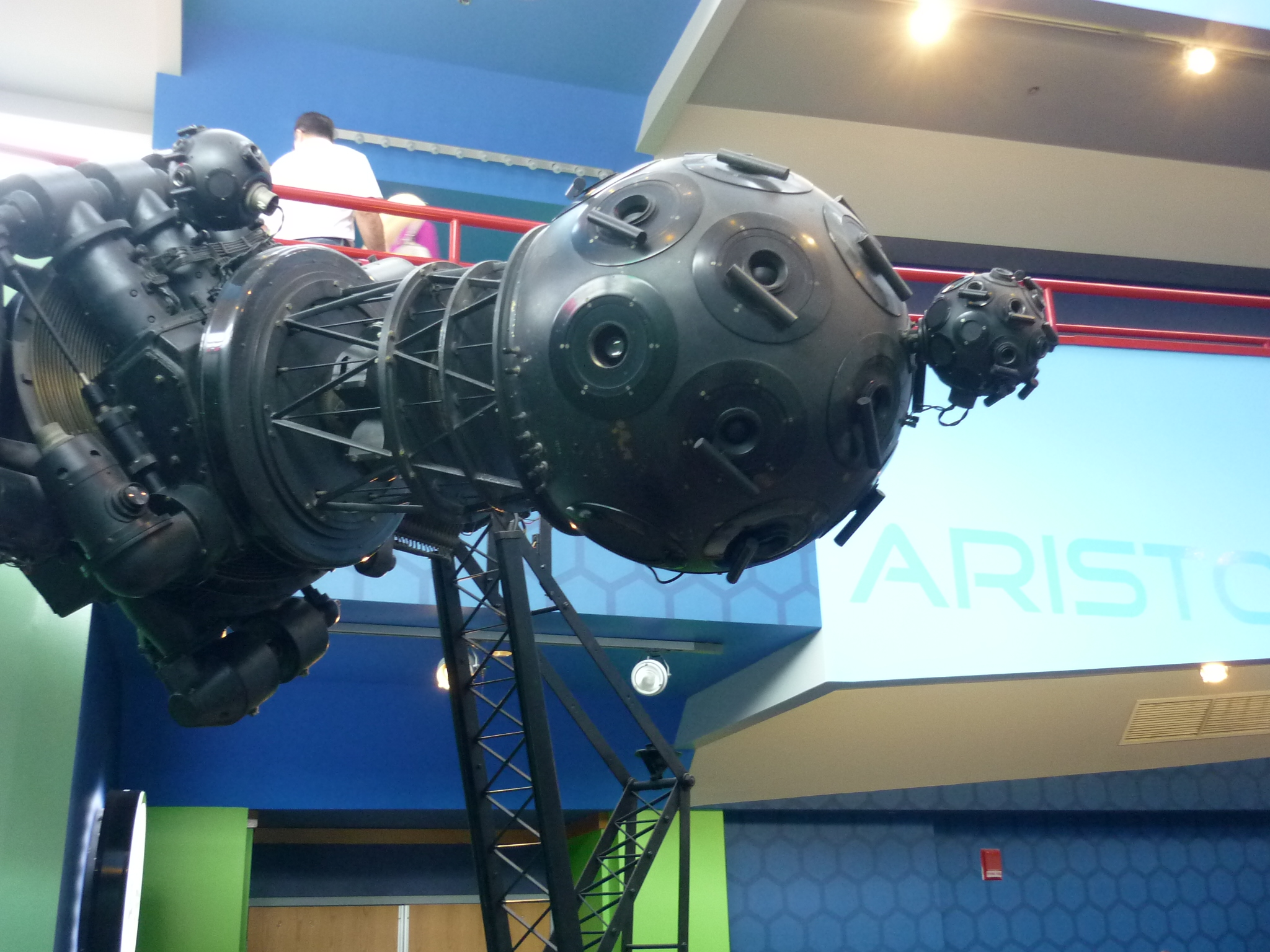
The Zeiss Model II Star Projector

Equipment in the Buhl Planetarium included a Zeiss II Planetarium projector with 106 lenses capable of producing 9000 images of stars. The projector was manufactured by the Zeiss Optical Works in Jena, Germany, at a cost of $135,000. The planetarium had a 492-seat “Theater of the Stars” with a 65-foot-diameter dome. This projector was officially retired in 1994.

The Buhl Planetarium was the first building of its type to have a special sound system for the hearing-impaired in its operating theater.

The planetarium also housed a thirty-five foot long Foucault pendulum and a ten-inch, Siderostat-type, refractor telescope (now the second largest of its type).

The planetarium also housed the Miniature Railroad and Village from 1954.

== Closing and historic landmark designation ==
The Buhl Planetarium and Institute of Popular Science closed as a general public venue on August 31, 1991, but continued to hold science classes, camps and teacher workshops in the building as an annex of its successor, Kamin Science Center, which opened in 1991. In 1994, the Annex closed and all programming moved to the CSC, while the Carnegie Museums of Pittsburgh sought a new use or owner for the building. In April 2002, Pittsburgh City Council approved the lease of the building and it is now part of the Children's Museum of Pittsburgh. It was added to the List of Pittsburgh History and Landmarks Foundation Historic Landmarks in 2001, and the List of City of Pittsburgh historic designations on July 29, 2005.
