= East Street Valley =

Former neighborhood in Pittsburgh, Pennsylvania

- Former neighborhood of Pittsburgh
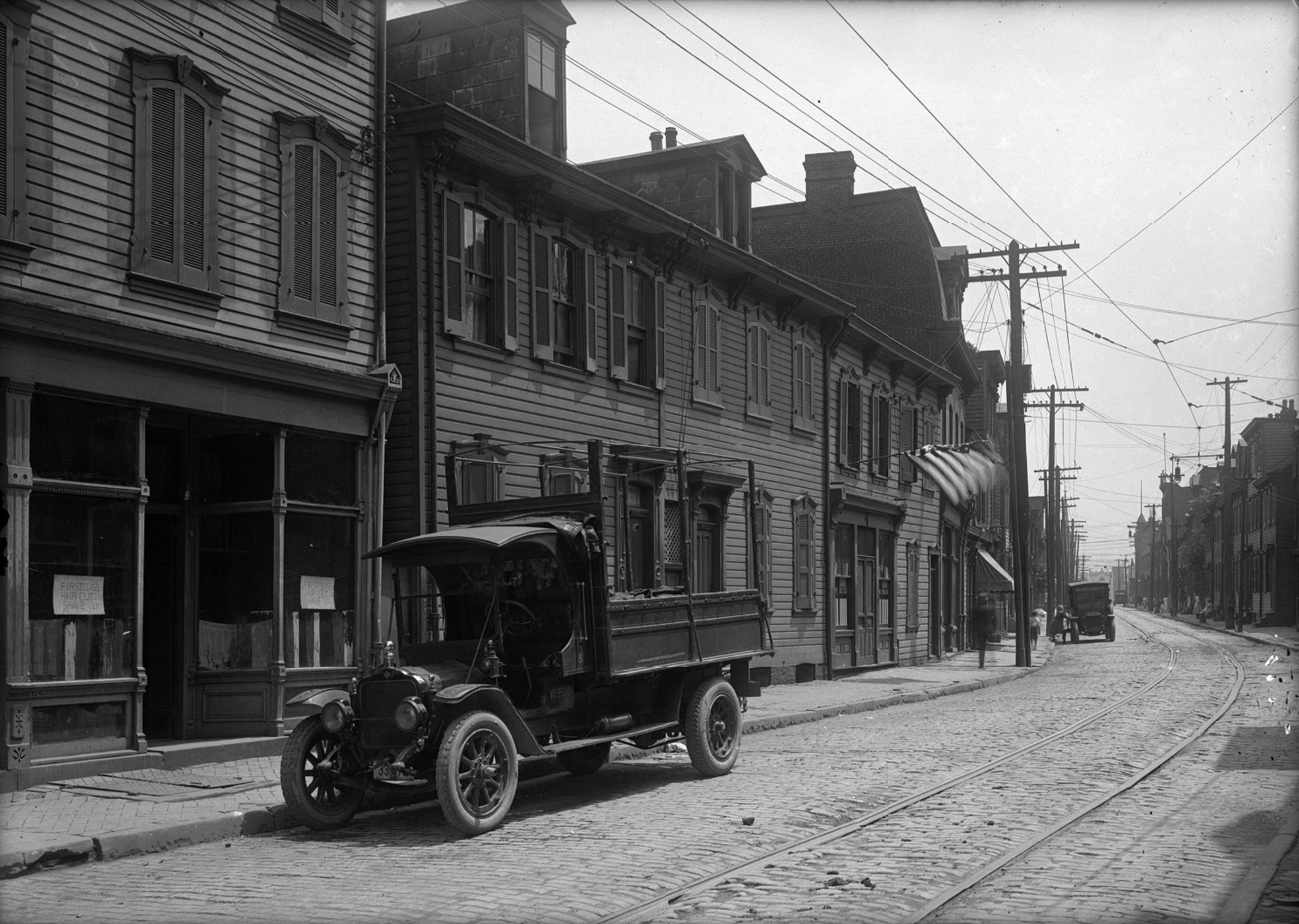
- East Street, photographed by the Pittsburgh City Photographer on July 6, 1922.

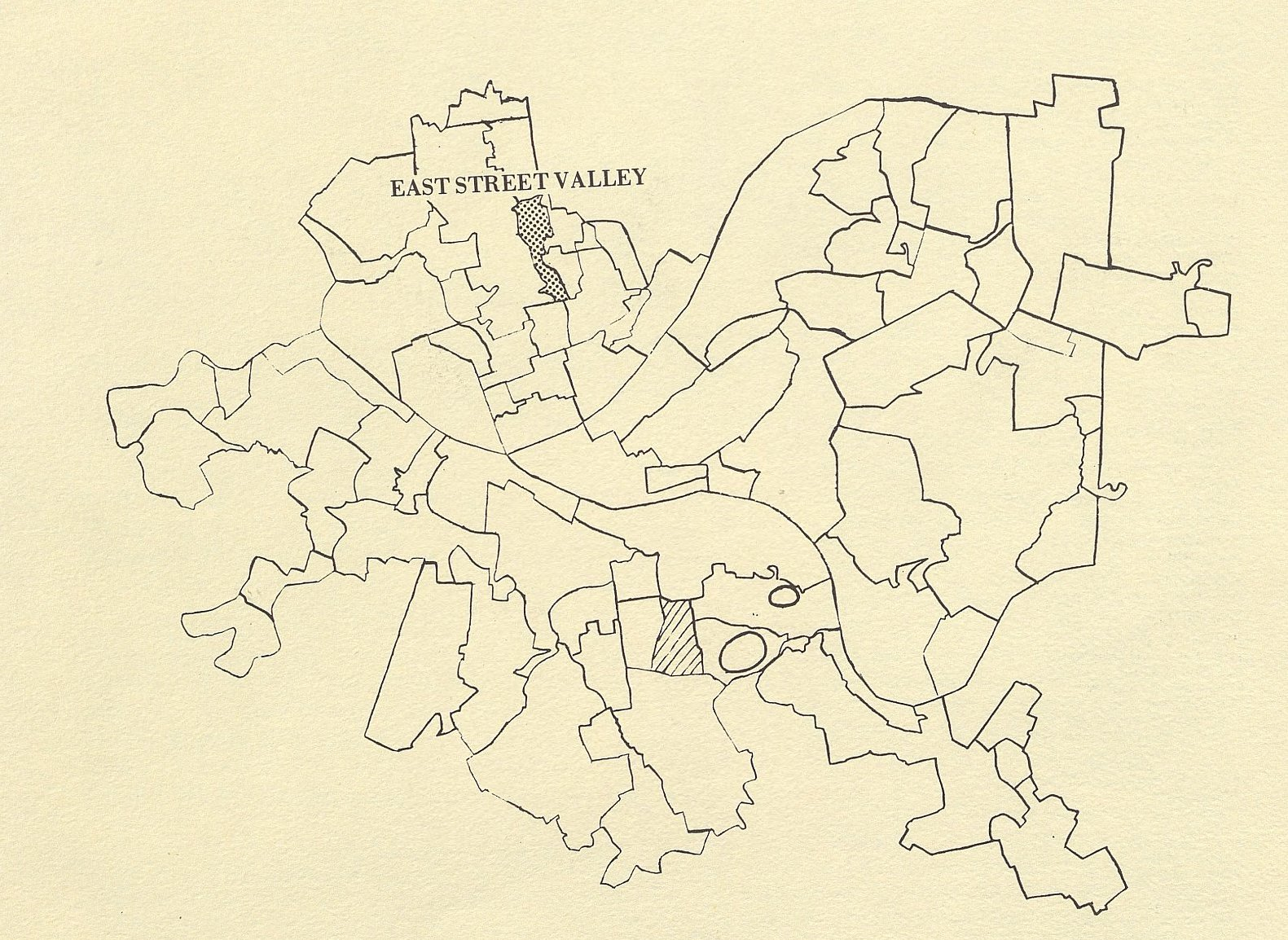
- Coordinates: 40.4671°N 80.0004°W
- Country: United States
- State: Pennsylvania
- County: Allegheny County
- City: Pittsburgh

East Street Valley was a neighborhood on Pittsburgh's North Side that stretched northward along the historic path of Butcher's Run, once home to residences, shops, industries, and civic and religious institutions. The neighborhood was demolished prior to the construction of Parkway North, causing the displacement of hundreds of residents over several decades.

== History ==
=== Early history ===
As the region formerly known as the city of Allegheny grew in the early 18th century from a borough of hundreds to a city of thousands, people including many German immigrants began to settle in the valley between Nunnery Hill and Spring Hill. The corridor became a dense offshoot of Allegheny's Deutschtown section, with residences developing alongside factories and other industrial structures. Mass transit first arrived in the neighborhood in the early 1880s in the form of horse-drawn streetcars operated by the People's Park Passenger Railway Company. By 1907, when Pittsburgh annexed the valley along with the rest of Allegheny, the East Street Valley was home to a school, a lumberyard, a soap factory, a singing society, two meatpackers, three churches, and numerous other small shops and institutions.

=== "Urban renewal" and the East Street Valley Expressway ===
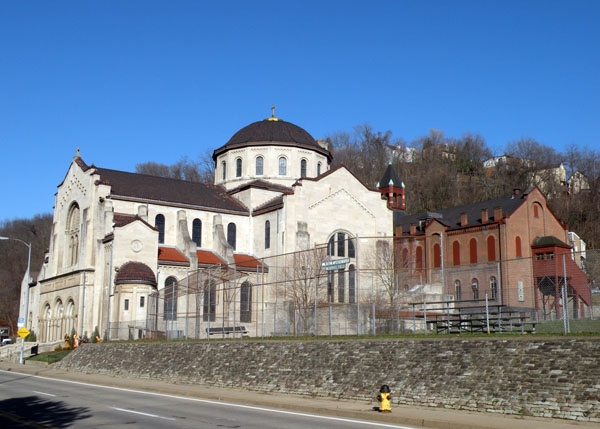
St. Boniface Roman Catholic Church located at 2208 East Street in the Spring Hill–City View neighborhood of Pittsburgh, Pennsylvania, on December 12, 2009.

Efforts to remake the Lower North Side in the image of a prosperous, car-friendly, "towers in the park" city center began as early as 1939, when a local coalition called the Federation of Civic Bodies advocated for slum clearance, street improvements, and real estate development. Plans coalesced further in 1954 with the publishing of the North Side Study. Again, planners and business leaders expressed their intention to overhaul much of the Lower North Side's built environment in order to remove blight, increase commerce, reduce traffic congestion, and provide more parking. They proposed several new highways, one of which would connect car-owning suburbanites to Downtown Pittsburgh and the North Shore via the East Street Valley. Though it was not explicitly stated within the North Side Study, most if not all of the valley's residents would be displaced by such a highway.

Public planning meetings for the East Street Valley Expressway, as the project came to be known, commenced in 1963 and continued through the decade, during which time a highway cut through the Manchester neighborhood and some 850 families and dozens of businesses fled the wrecking ball in the newly-dubbed Allegheny Center. Government planners thus faced heightened resistance from local residents — especially members of the Highway Emergency and Relocation Team, or HEART, who sought fairer treatment and better recompensation for affected property owners — as well as from historic preservationists, who fought for a route alteration unveiled in 1974 that would spare St. Boniface Roman Catholic Church. There was relatively little remonstration against the expressway itself.

In 1963, PennDOT estimated that there were either 480 or 640 families living within proposed rights-of-way in the East Street Valley. By 1981, 805 families and individuals had been relocated and 134 business had been relocated or closed. Meanwhile, 133 families, 130 individuals, and 88 businesses still required relocation. The turmoil and heartache of relocation for residents, many of whom were working class, was compounded by deindustrialization and rampant unemployment in the Pittsburgh region during the 1970s and 1980s.

On June 16, 1982, nearly three decades after the North Side Study, and just as the fervor for urban expressways had already begun to wane, civic leaders including Mayor Richard Caliguiri, Governor Dick Thornburgh, and Pittsburgh Steelers owner and Northsider Art Rooney celebrated the expressway's groundbreaking. Optometrist and HEART organizer Marty Krauss told a reporter, "I can assure you that the people celebrating today live comfortably. They live in places like Mt. Lebanon or Fox Chapel. They are not threatened by relocation. If they would be, they could get a good attorney."
