= Fayette County Housing Authority =

Public Housing Authority overview
- Headquarters: 624 Pittsburgh Road; Uniontown, Pennsylvania 15401
- Employees: 30
- Website: Fayette County Housing Authority

The Fayette County Housing Authority oversees federal and state housing facilities, as well as Section 8 rentals in Fayette County, Pennsylvania. FCHA oversees 1,323 public housing units as well as 1,104 Section 8 rentals.

== Public housing facilities ==
Of the 1,323 public housing rentals, FCHA has them spread into nineteen federally overseen sites as well as four state-managed sites.

=== Federal sites ===
Project name	Location	# Units	Type of Project
Belle Vernon Apartments	Belle Vernon	150	Elderly
Biererwood Acres	South Union Twp.	86	Family
Clarence E. Hess Terrace	Masontown	50	Family/Elderly
Crossland Place	Uniontown	40	Family
East View Terrace	Uniontown	100	Family
Fort Mason Village	Masontown	100	Family
Howard J. Mulligan Manor	Brownsville	63	Elderly
J. Watson Sembower	Uniontown	32	Family
Lemont Heights	North Union Twp.	24	Family
Marion Villa	Washington Twp.	77	Family
Marshall Manor	Uniontown	97	Elderly
Outcrop I	Nicholson Township	32	Family
Outcrop II	Nicholson Township	20	Family
Scattered Sites	Uniontown	23	Family
Snowden Terrace	Brownsville	60	Elderly/Family
South Hills Terrace	Brownsville	47	Family
White Swan Apartments	Uniontown	78	Elderly
Individual Homes	Fairchance	28	Family

=== State-managed sites ===
- Little Wood Acres
- Luzerne Terrace
- Oliver Heights
- Washington Mill

== See also ==
- Housing and Urban Development
- List of public housing authorities in Pennsylvania
