= James Andrews (stonemason) =

Stonemason and civil engineer active in Pittsburgh, St. Louis, and elsewhere

- Born: October 7, 1828; New Abbey, Dumfries and Galloway, Scotland
- Died: July 6, 1897 (aged 69); Allegheny, Pennsylvania, United States
- Resting place: Union Dale Cemetery, Pittsburgh
- Occupations: Stonemason and engineer
- Known for: Projects with James Buchanan Eads, Heathside Cottage
- Spouse: Maria Carson (m. 1849)

James Andrews (October 7, 1828 – July 6, 1897) was a Scottish-American stonemason, engineer, and capitalist who collaborated with civil engineer James Buchanan Eads on such projects as the Eads Bridge in St. Louis, the Mississippi River jetties, and a proposed railway system across the Isthmus of Tehuantepec. He was reportedly a millionaire by the end of his life, having accrued a fortune of at least $32 million in 2022 dollars. His Heathside Cottage in the Fineview neighborhood of Pittsburgh is listed on the National Register of Historic Places. He was known for much of his life as "Col. James Andrews," though he never served in the military.

== Work ==
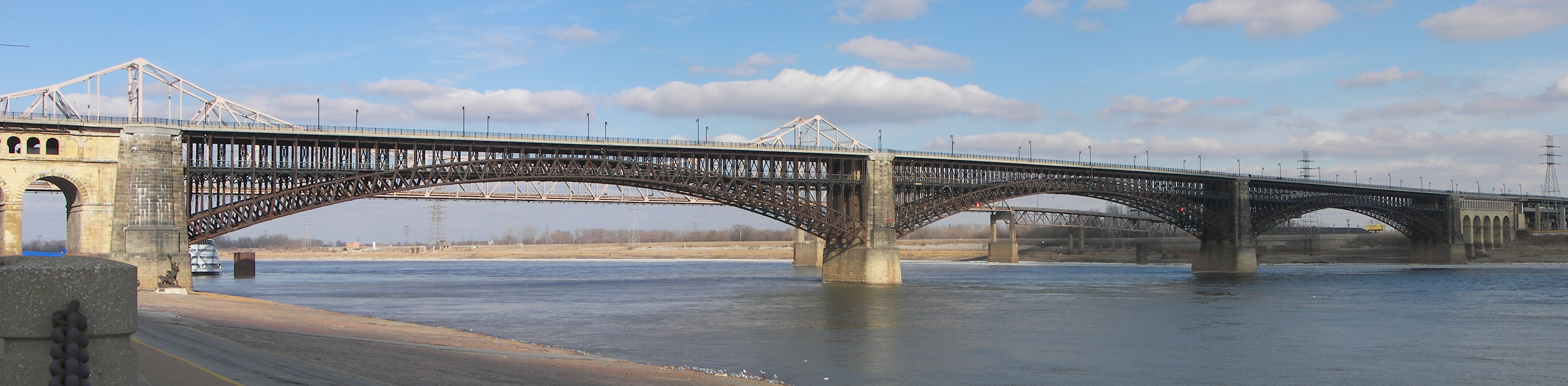
Eads Bridge, St. Louis

Andrews received no formal education, going immediately into a masonry apprenticeship as a young man. In his early 20s, he won a contract to oversee the masonry work on a new post office in downtown Pittsburgh, which served as the city's main post office from 1853 until 1891. As his career progressed, he turned his attention to bridges and tunnels. Andrews directed construction of the masonry piers of the Eads Bridge, constructed between 1867 and 1874, and in so doing formed a relationship with Eads himself. Andrews later served as mason for Eads' South Pass jetties, which eased passage by ships through the mouth of the Mississippi River. Andrews and Eads eventually produced designs for a railroad to span the Isthmus of Tehuantepec in Mexico, proposed as an alternative to the Panama Canal. The railway system was intended to transport entire ships between the Gulf of Mexico and the Pacific Ocean

Andrews also directed for some time the Pittsburgh Steel and Iron Company and the Federal Street & Pleasant Valley Railway Company, which was based in Allegheny City.

== Personal life ==
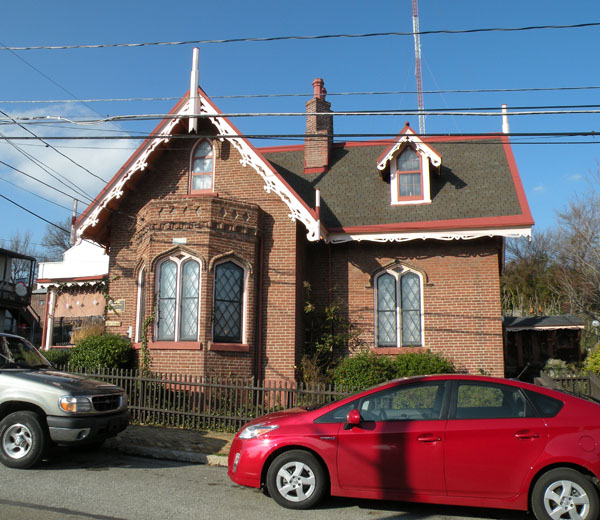
Heathside Cottage, Pittsburgh

James Andrews was born on October 10, 1827, in New Abbey, Dumfries and Galloway, Scotland and immigrated to the United States from Scotland as a boy. He lived for much of his adult life in the city of Allegheny, the North Side of present-day Pittsburgh, Pennsylvania. He married Irish immigrant Maria Carson in 1849. He commissioned a home for his family on Allegheny's Nunnery Hill, Heathside Cottage, between 1864 and 1866, and moved there soon thereafter. The Andrews moved into a much larger estate — Ingleside Place, also on Nunnery Hill — in the early 1880s. Andrews had the neighborhood's namesake "Nunnery," the old St. Clare's Seminary, demolished to build his new manor. The estate was named in reference to Ingleston, a town in Scotland owned by Andrews' father. Andrews died at Ingleside Place on July 6, 1897, of a kidney ailment. Maria continued to live there until her death in 1926 at age 98. The estate was left abandoned and later sold by the Andrews' heirs to the Housing Authority of the City of Pittsburgh in 1941.
