= Deffenbaugh Site =

- Deffenbaugh Site (36FA57)
- U.S. National Register of Historic Places
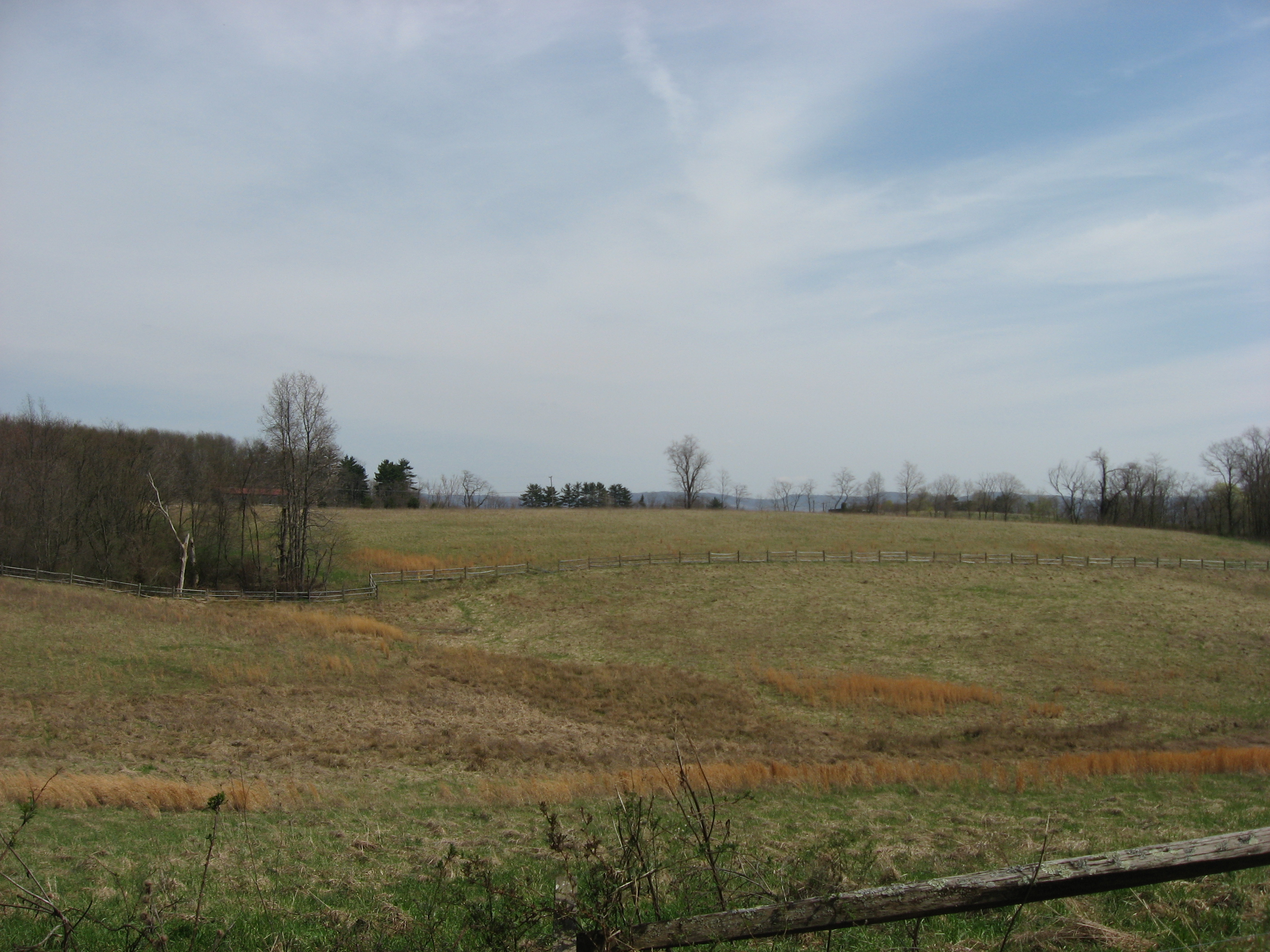
- Overview of the site

- Location within Pennsylvania Location within the United States
- Location: On a saddle between two hills, along Old Frame Rd., in Nicholson Township, Fayette County, Pennsylvania
- Coordinates: 39°48′7.2″N 79°51′36″W
- Area: 2 acres (0.81 ha)
- NRHP reference No.: 84003368
- Added to NRHP: May 14, 1984

The Deffenbaugh Site is an archaeological site in southwestern Fayette County, Pennsylvania, United States. Located in Nicholson Township west of the borough of Smithfield, it was once occupied by a village of the Monongahela people.

== Location ==
The Deffenbaugh Site occupies a saddle between two low hills; its elevation is approximately 1,140 feet (350 m), while the hills rise to approximately 1,200 feet (370 m). Rising in a valley immediately southeast of the site is a spring that feeds York Run; via Georges Creek, this stream is a tributary of the Monongahela River. Land in the vicinity of the site is a mix of cleared and wooded areas; the site itself is clear of trees.

== Profile ==
Like other Monongahela villages, the Deffenbaugh Site is believed to consist of the remains of circular houses built around a central plaza and surrounded by a defensive stockade. Like many other Monongahela villages, the site occupies a location atop a ridge; this location was likely chosen for its defensive value, as the Monongahela were a warlike people who frequently fought among themselves. The residents may have been related to those of villages excavated in Somerset County to the east, who produced pottery similar to that found at Deffenbaugh. Additionally, the site may be related to other sites in Fayette County; while pottery samples for identification purposes are lacking, it is known that at least two other Monongahela villages occupied hilltops within 4 miles (6.4 km) of Deffenbaugh.

== Excavations ==
The first study of the Deffenbaugh Site, published in 1931, reported the excavations of local archaeologist George Fisher, who recorded the discovery of bone beads and the burial of a child. After this minimal investigation, the next work at the site was carried out in the 1960s by Donald Tanner of the Carnegie Museums of Pittsburgh. His test excavations revealed pottery, bits of bones, and shells, as well as the remnants of a tramway. A further study, conducted in 1980, revealed that the tramway had significantly damaged part of the site. Despite this disturbance, it was rated to be in fine condition overall; because surface mining has disrupted wide areas of Fayette County, sites such as Deffenbaugh are extremely rare and thus of great value.

In 1984, the Deffenbaugh Site was added to the National Register of Historic Places for its information-yielding potential.

== See also ==
- List of Native American archaeological sites on the National Register of Historic Places in Pennsylvania
