= New Geneva Historic District =

Historic district in Pennsylvania, United States

- U.S. National Register of Historic Places
- U.S. Historic district
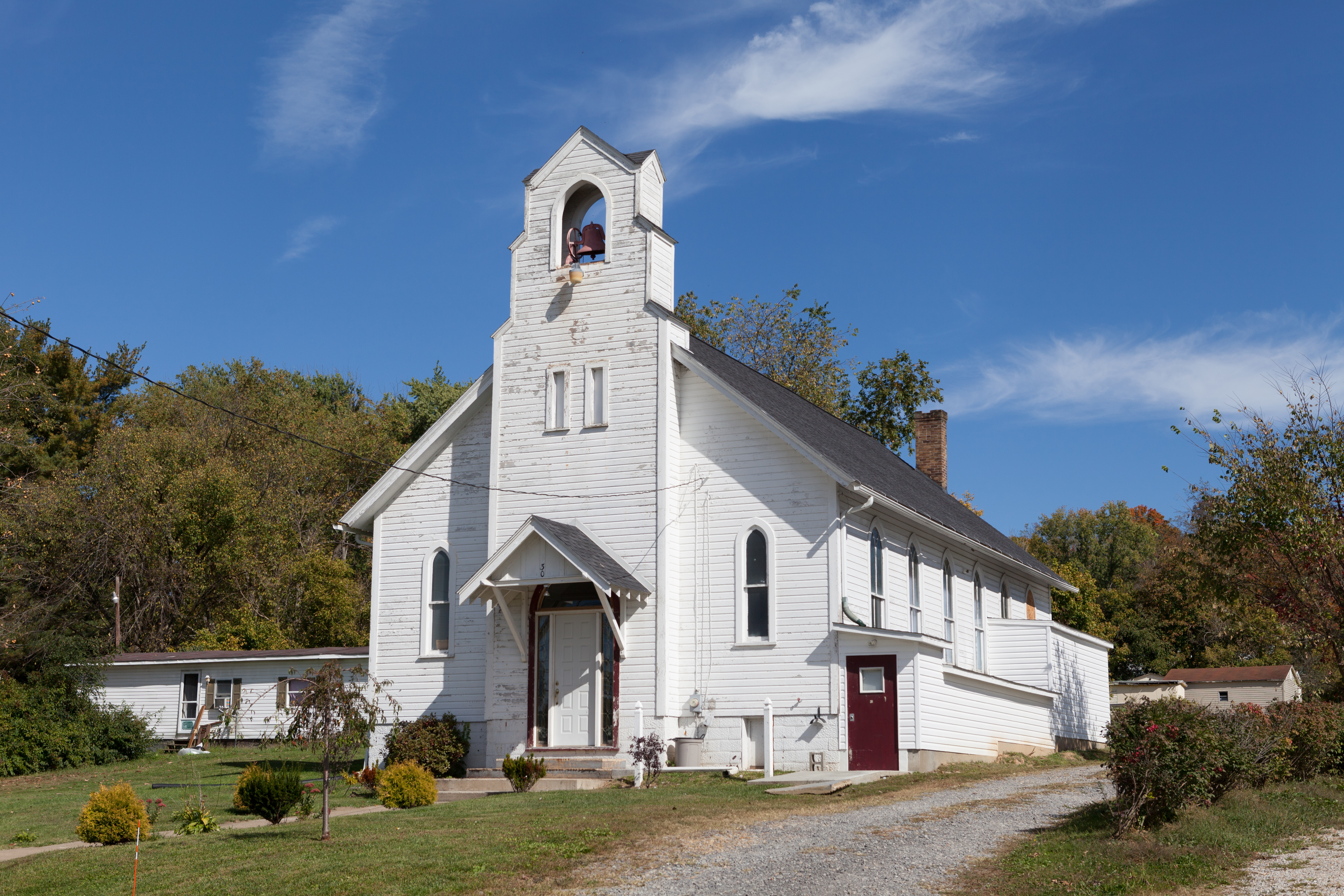
- The church at 30 Front St

- Location within Pennsylvania Location within the United States
- Location: Roughly bounded by Front St. E from Church Ln., Georges Cr. and the Monongahela R., Nicholson Township, Nicholson Township, Pennsylvania
- Coordinates: 39°47′11″N 79°54′49″W
- Area: 16 acres (6.5 ha)
- Built: 1797
- Architectural style: Federal, Queen Anne
- MPS: Greensboro--New Geneva MPS
- NRHP reference No.: 95000119
- Added to NRHP: August 28, 1996

The New Geneva Historic District is a national historic district that is located in Nicholson Township, Fayette County, Pennsylvania.

It was added to the National Register of Historic Places in 1996.

== History and architectural features ==
This district includes twenty-nine contributing buildings and the stone Wilson House (c. 1768). Most of the contributing buildings were built between c. 1790 and 1910, and are representative of a number of popular architectural styles including Federal and Queen Anne. The district includes twenty-two contributing houses, two churches, a school building, a store, a shop, a garage, and some sheds. There are also three archaeological sites associated with the former pottery works, and a historic site related to the ferry landing. The town of New Geneva was originally laid out in 1797, by Albert Gallatin.
