= St. Boniface Roman Catholic Church (Pittsburgh) =

Historic church in Pennsylvania, United States

- U.S. National Register of Historic Places
- Pittsburgh Landmark – PHLF
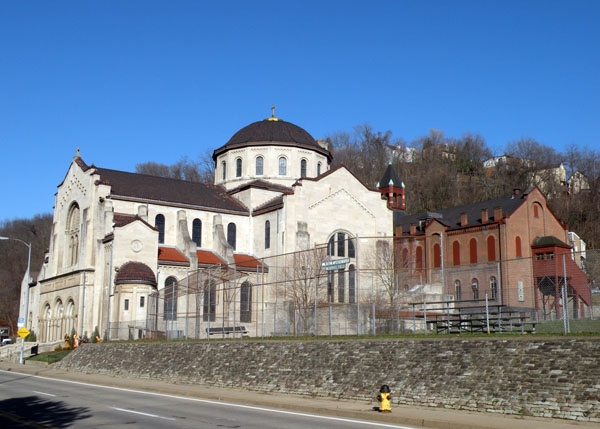

- Location within Pittsburgh Location within Pennsylvania Location within the United States
- Location: 2208 East Street, Pittsburgh, Pennsylvania
- Coordinates: 40°28′1.32″N 80°0′0.03″W
- Area: 0.7 acres (0.28 ha)
- Built: 1925 and 1926
- Architect: A.F. Link
- Architectural style: Romanesque Revival, Byzantine Revival, Italianate
- NRHP reference No.: 81000525

Significant dates
- Added to NRHP: November 17, 1981
- Designated PHLF: 1974

St. Boniface Catholic Church is a Roman Catholic church in the East Street Valley neighborhood of Pittsburgh, Pennsylvania within the Diocese of Pittsburgh.

== Description ==
The parish was founded in 1884 by German-Americans. The church building located at 2208 East Street was constructed in 1925 and 1926, and added to the National Register of Historic Places in 1981. The church has a three bay nave, and a pendentive dome. Guastavino tile system on the dome and interior vaulting, and the exterior is cased in limestone with some carving.

From 1994 to 2019, the church was part of Holy Wisdom Parish, a 1994 union between St. Ambrose Parish in Spring Hill and St. Boniface. It was also home to St. John XXIII Personal Quasi-Parish, which is dedicated exclusively to the Traditional Latin Mass (Extraordinary Form of the Roman Rite).. Since 2019, the church is part of Christ Our Savior Parish, along with St. Peter Church and St. Cyril Church.
