= Johnstown Housing Authority =

- JHA

Public housing authority overview
- Type: Public Housing
- Jurisdiction: City of Johnstown, Cambria County, Pennsylvania
- Headquarters: 501 Chestnut Street; Johnstown, Pennsylvania 15906

Map
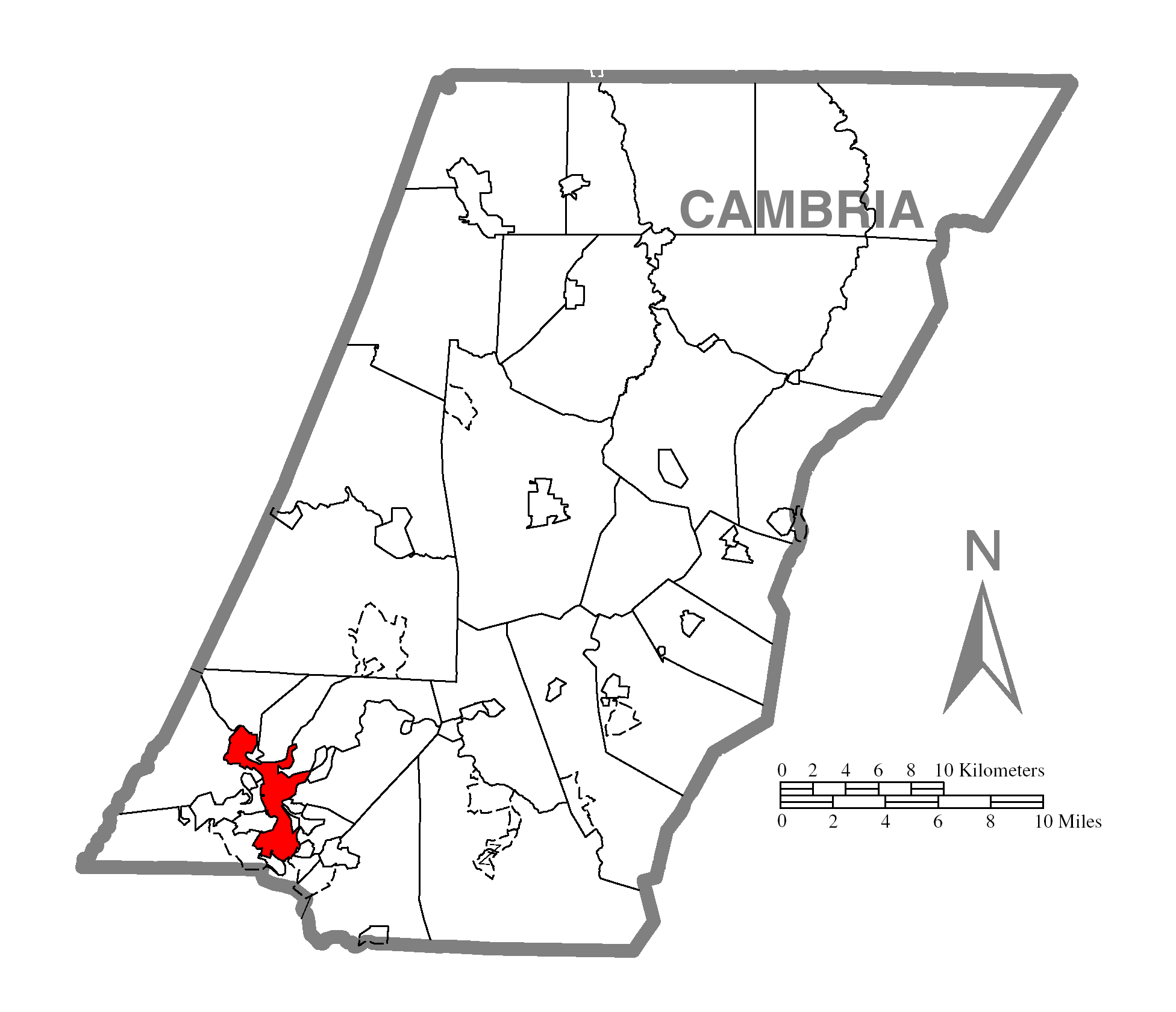
- City of Johnstown

The Johnstown Housing Authority in Pennsylvania, USA, is the only municipal authority in Cambria County that is designated to oversee public housing. Johnstown Housing Authority has four housing projects as well as four senior buildings inside the city limits. In 2011, the authority had a 98-percent occupancy rate as well as a waiting list.

== Housing Projects ==
Site Name	Neighborhood	Year Constructed	Units/Buildings	Bldg. Type	Type of site
Connor Towers	Center Town	1972	169/1	High-Rise	Senior/Disabled
Coopersdale Homes	21st Ward	1959	121/6	Mid-Rise	Family
Loughner Plaza	8th Ward	1985	51/1	Mid-Rise	Senior/Disabled
Oakhurst Homes	20th Ward	1943	100/16	Townhouse/Villas	Family
Oakhurst Homes Extension	20th Ward	1951	300/54	Townhouses	Family
Prospect Homes	Prospect	1943	110/19	Townhouse/Villas	Family
Solomon Homes	17th Ward	1959	248/14	Mid-Rise	Family
Town House Tower	Center Town	1976	120/1	High-Rise	Senior/Disabled
Vine Street Towers	Center Town	1971	182/1	High-Rise	Senior/Disabled

== See also ==
- List of municipal authorities in Cambria County, Pennsylvania
- Housing and Urban Development
- City of Johnstown Housing Authority Project Map, Johnstown Tribune-Democrat
- List of public housing authorities in Pennsylvania
