= List of public housing authorities in Pennsylvania =

This is a list of public housing authorities in Pennsylvania.

Public Housing Authority	City	External link
Adams County Housing Authority	Gettysburg, Pennsylvania	
Allegheny County Housing Authority	Pittsburgh, Pennsylvania	http://www.achsng.com/
Allegheny County Residential Finance Authority	Pittsburgh, Pennsylvania	
Allentown City Housing Authority	Allentown, Pennsylvania	
Altoona Housing Authority	Altoona, Pennsylvania	http://www.altoonahousing.org
Armstrong County Housing Authority	Kittanning, Pennsylvania	
Beaver County Housing Authority	Beaver, Pennsylvania	https://web.archive.org/web/20091107123939/http://www.beavercounty.com/Service/HousingAuthority.asp
Bedford County Housing Authority	Bedford, Pennsylvania	
Berks County Housing Authority	Reading, Pennsylvania	https://www.berksha.org/
Bethlehem Housing Authority	Bethlehem, Pennsylvania	http://www.bha645.com
Blair County Housing Authority	Hollidaysburg, Pennsylvania	
Bradford City Housing Authority	Bradford, Pennsylvania	
Bucks County Housing Authority	Doylestown, Pennsylvania	
Butler County Housing Authority	Butler, Pennsylvania	http://www.housingauthority.com
Carbon County Housing Authority	Lehighton, Pennsylvania	
Carbondale Housing Authority	Carbondale, Pennsylvania	
Centre County Housing Authority	Bellefonte, Pennsylvania	
Chester County Housing Authority	West Chester, Pennsylvania	
Chester Housing Authority	Chester, Pennsylvania	https://web.archive.org/web/20110626195022/http://www.chesterhousingauthority.org/
Clarion County Housing Authority	Clarion, Pennsylvania	
Clearfield County Housing Authority	Clearfield, Pennsylvania	
Clinton County Housing Authority	Lock Haven, Pennsylvania	
Columbia County Housing Authority	Bloomsburg, Pennsylvania	
Connellsville Housing Authority	Connellsville, Pennsylvania	http://www.chaofpa.com/
Corry Housing Authority	Corry, Pennsylvania	
Cumberland County Housing Authority	Carlisle, Pennsylvania	http://www.cchra.com/
Dauphin County Housing Authority	Steelton, Pennsylvania	
Delaware County Housing Authority	Woodlyn, Pennsylvania	
Dubois City Housing Authority	Dubois, Pennsylvania	
Easton City Housing Authority	Easton, Pennsylvania	
Elk County Housing Authority	Johnsonburg, Pennsylvania	
Erie City Housing Authority	Erie, Pennsylvania	
Erie County Housing Authority	Corry, Pennsylvania	
Fayette County Housing Authority	Uniontown, Pennsylvania	
Franklin City Housing Authority	Franklin, Pennsylvania	
Franklin County Housing Authority	Chambersburg, Pennsylvania	
Fulton County Housing Authority	McConnellsburg, Pennsylvania	
Greene County Housing Authority	Waynesburg, Pennsylvania	
Harrisburg Housing Authority	Harrisburg, Pennsylvania	http://www.harrisburghousing.org/
Hazleton City Housing Authority	Hazleton, Pennsylvania	
Huntingdon County Housing Authority	Mt. Union, Pennsylvania	
Indiana County Housing Authority	Indiana, Pennsylvania	
Jefferson County Housing Authority	Punxsutawney, Pennsylvania	
Johnstown Housing Authority	Johnstown, Pennsylvania	
Lackawanna County Housing Authority	Dunmore, Pennsylvania	http://www.hacl.org/
Lancaster County Housing Authority	Lancaster, Pennsylvania	http://www.lchra.com
Lancaster Housing Authority	Lancaster, Pennsylvania	http://lcha.ws
Lawrence County Housing Authority	New Castle, Pennsylvania	
Lebanon County Housing And Redevelopment Authority	Lebanon, Pennsylvania	
Lehigh County Housing Authority	Emmaus, Pennsylvania	
Luzerne County Housing Authority	Kingston, Pennsylvania	
Lycoming County Housing Authority	Williamsport, Pennsylvania	
McKean County Housing Authority	Smethport, Pennsylvania	
McKeesport City Housing Authority	McKeesport, Pennsylvania	http://www.mckha.org/
Meadville Housing Authority	Meadville, Pennsylvania	
Mercer County Housing Authority	Sharon, Pennsylvania	
Mifflin County Housing Authority	Lewistown, Pennsylvania	
Monroe County Housing Authority	Stroudsburg, Pennsylvania	
Montgomery County Housing Authority	Norristown, Pennsylvania	
Montour County Housing Authority	Danville, Pennsylvania	
Nanticoke Housing Authority	Nanticoke, Pennsylvania	
Northampton County Housing Authority	Bath, Pennsylvania	
Northumberland County Housing Authority	Milton, Pennsylvania	
Oil City Housing Authority	Oil City, Pennsylvania	
Philadelphia Housing Authority	Philadelphia, Pennsylvania	http://www.pha.phila.gov
Pittsburgh City Housing Authority	Pittsburgh, Pennsylvania	http://www.hacp.org/
Pittston City Housing Authority	Pittston, Pennsylvania	
Potter County Housing And Redevelopment Authority	Coudersport, Pennsylvania	
Pottsville Housing Authority	Pottsville, Pennsylvania	https://web.archive.org/web/20100811043950/http://www.pottsvillehousing.com/
Reading Housing Authority	Reading, Pennsylvania	http://www.readingha.org/
Schuylkill County Housing Authority	Schuylkill Haven, Pennsylvania	
Scranton Housing Authority	Scranton, Pennsylvania	
Shamokin Housing Authority	Shamokin, Pennsylvania	
Snyder Housing Authority	Middleburg, Pennsylvania	
Somerset County Housing Authority	Boswell, Pennsylvania	
Sullivan County Housing Authority	Laporte, Pennsylvania	
Sunbury Housing Authority	Sunbury, Pennsylvania	
Susquehanna County Housing Authority	Montrose, Pennsylvania	
Tioga-Bradford-Sullivan Counties Housing Authority	Blossburg, Pennsylvania	
Titusville Housing Authority	Titusville, Pennsylvania	
Union County Housing Authority	Lewisburg, Pennsylvania	https://web.archive.org/web/20111009143546/http://www.housing-authority.co.union.pa.us/
Venango County Housing Authority	Oil City, Pennsylvania	
Warren County Housing Authority	Warren, Pennsylvania	
Washington County Housing Authority	Washington, Pennsylvania	https://web.archive.org/web/20030524004932/http://housing-authority.co.washington.pa.us/
Wayne County Housing Authority	Waymart, Pennsylvania	
Westmoreland County Housing Authority	Greensburg, Pennsylvania	
Wilkes Barre Housing Authority	Wilkes Barre, Pennsylvania	
Williamsport Housing Authority	Williamsport, Pennsylvania	
Wyoming County Housing And Redevelopment Authority	Nicholson, Pennsylvania	
York City Housing Authority	York, Pennsylvania	
