= Heathside Cottage =

Historic house in Pittsburgh, Pennsylvania

- U.S. National Register of Historic Places
- Pittsburgh Landmark – PHLF
- Pittsburgh Historic Designation
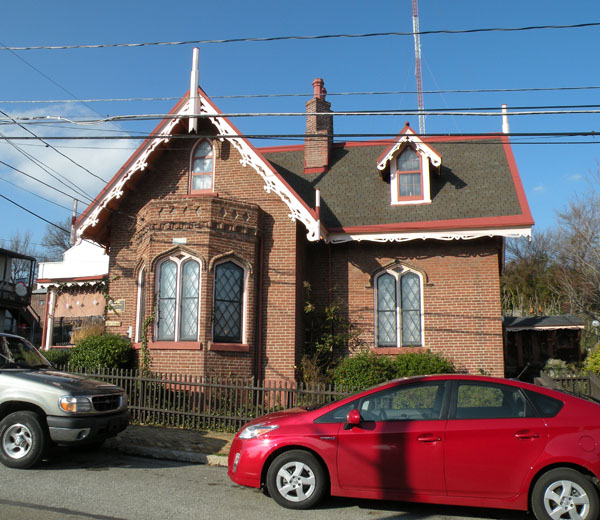

- Location within Pittsburgh Location within Pennsylvania Location within the United States
- Location: 416 Catoma St., Pittsburgh, Pennsylvania
- Coordinates: 40°27′38.83″N 80°0′12.88″W
- Area: 0.5 acres (0.20 ha)
- Built: 1864-1866
- Architectural style: Late Victorian, Gothic Revival
- NRHP reference No.: 74001740

Significant dates
- Added to NRHP: December 30, 1974
- Designated PHLF: 2000
- Designated PHD: November 6, 2019

The Heathside Cottage in the Fineview neighborhood of Pittsburgh, Pennsylvania, is a Gothic Revival structure built between 1864 and 1866 for the family of stonemason and civil engineer James Andrews. It was listed on the National Register of Historic Places in 1974.
