= Nunnery Hill Incline =

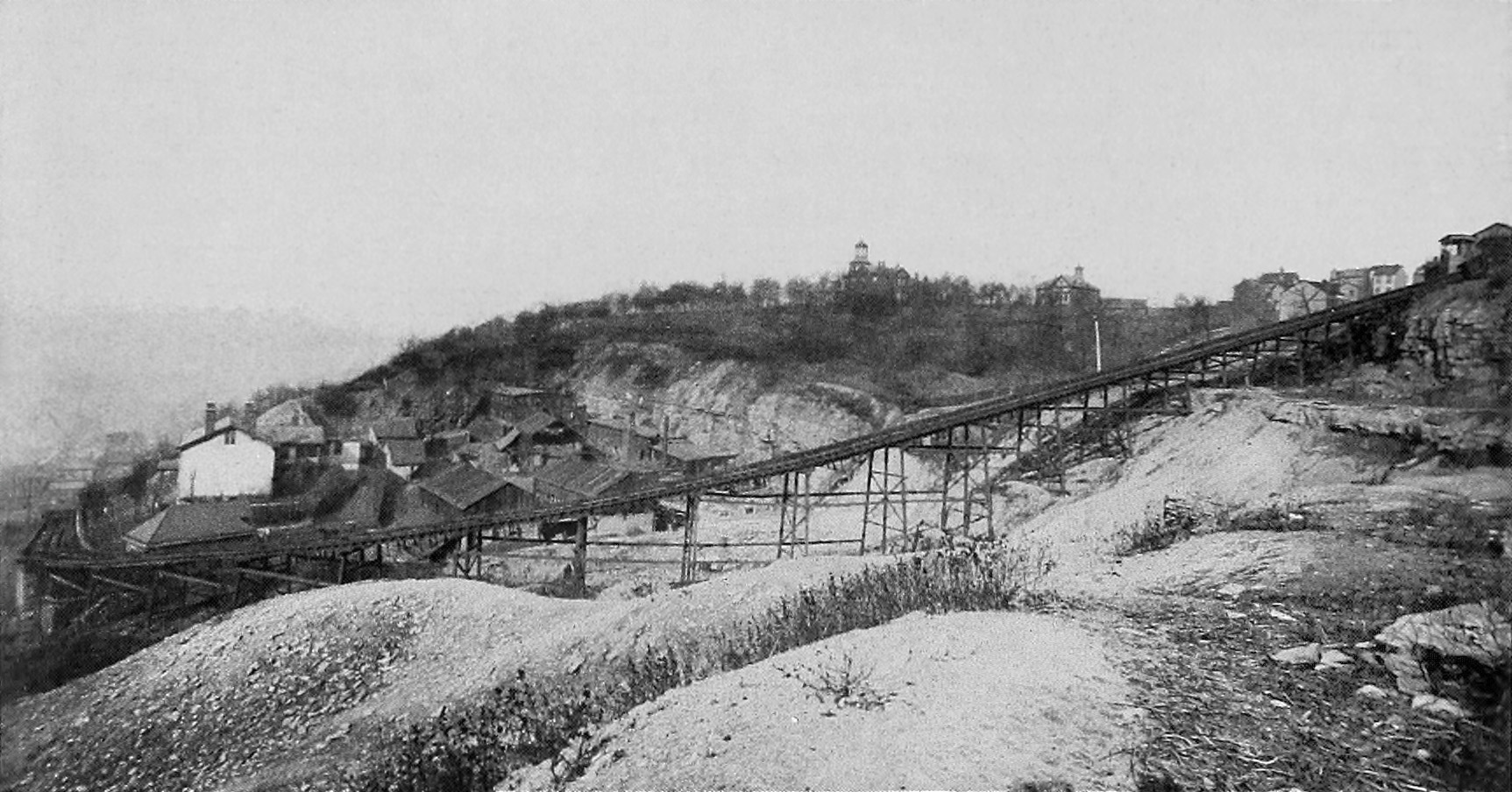

Overview
- Locale: Fineview, Pittsburgh, Pennsylvania
- Coordinates: 40.460°N 80.006°W

Service
- Type: Funicular

History
- Opened: 23 June 1888
- Closed: 13 September 1895

Technical
- Line length: 1,100 feet (340 m)
- Track gauge: 5 ft (1,524 mm)
- Minimum radius: 250 feet (76 m)

The Nunnery Hill Incline was a funicular located in Allegheny City, Pennsylvania, in what is now the Fineview neighborhood of Pittsburgh.

== History and notable features ==
Designed by Samuel Diescher, this incline operated from 1888 until 1895, running between its base station on Federal Street and its upper station on the currently named Meadville Street. It was one of only a few inclines with a curve in its track.

The name of the hill derived from a short-lived settlement of Poor Clares earlier in the century.

The incline suspended operations without warning on September 13, 1895, to the consternation of many of the hill's residents. It did not resume business. By 1901, it was being dismantled.

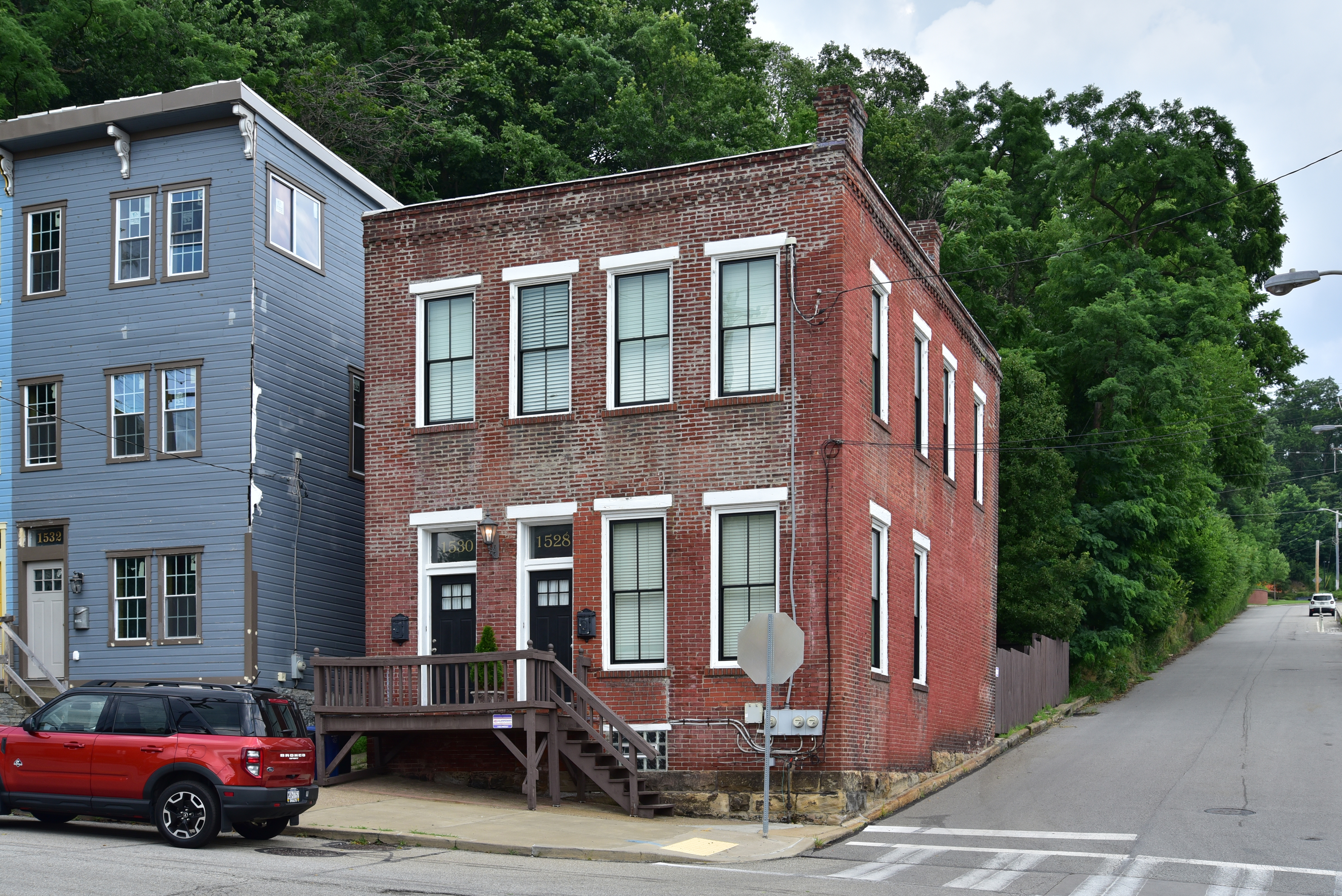
Former base station in 2025

Remnants of the incline, including the red-brick lower station and a stone retaining wall along Henderson Street, have been the focus of recent preservation efforts.

Both structures received City of Pittsburgh historic designations in 2011.

== See also ==
- List of funicular railways
- List of inclines in Pittsburgh
