= Henderson–Metz House =

Historic house in Pennsylvania, United States

- U.S. National Register of Historic Places
- Pittsburgh Landmark – PHLF
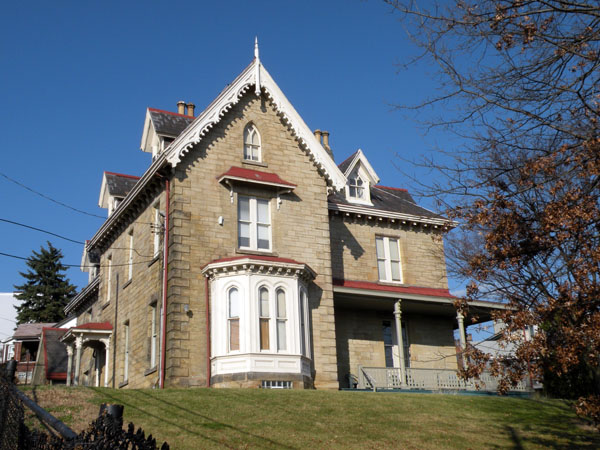

- Location within Pittsburgh Location within Pennsylvania Location within the United States
- Location: 1516 Warren St., Pittsburgh, Pennsylvania
- Coordinates: 40°27′37″N 80°0′8″W
- Area: 1.5 acres (0.61 ha)
- Architectural style: Gothic Revival
- NRHP reference No.: 79003141

Significant dates
- Added to NRHP: August 22, 1979
- Designated PHLF: 1976

The Henderson–Metz House is located in the Fineview neighborhood of Pittsburgh, Pennsylvania. The house was built circa 1860, was listed on the National Register of Historic Places in 1979.
