= Fineview =

Neighborhood in Pittsburgh, Pennsylvania, USA

- Neighborhood of Pittsburgh
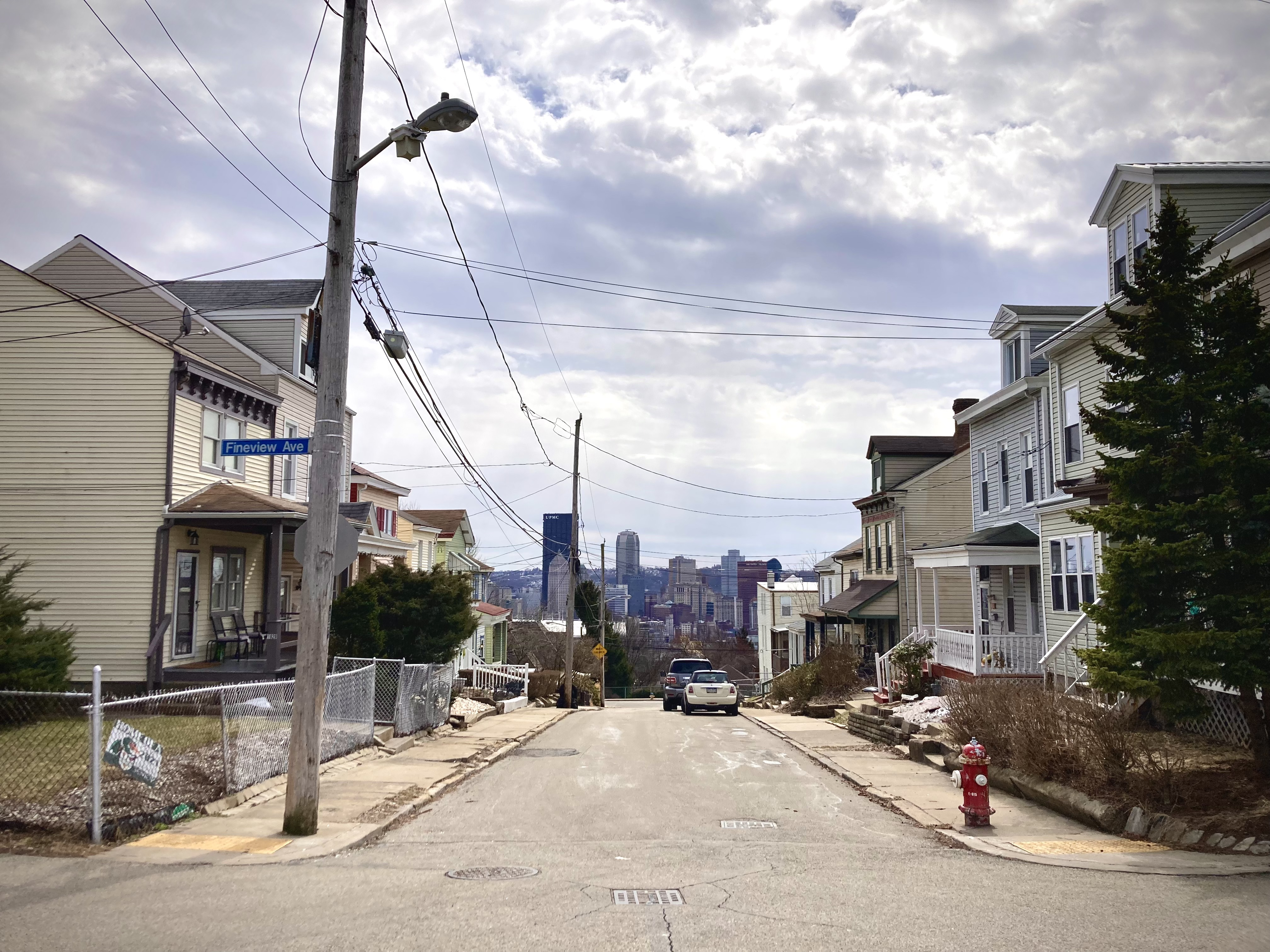
- Myler Street, looking down from Fineview Avenue

- Coordinates: 40.464°N 80.003°W
- Country: United States
- State: Pennsylvania
- County: Allegheny County
- City: Pittsburgh

Area
  - Total: 0.25 sq mi (0.65 km^{2})

Population (2010)
  - Total: 1,285
  - Density: 5,100/sq mi (2,000/km^{2})

Fineview—known to older generations as Nunnery Hill—is a neighborhood on Pittsburgh's North Side with expansive views of downtown Pittsburgh. The most famous of these views is from the Fineview Overlook at the corner of Catoma Street and Meadville Street.

In the past, this neighborhood was known for its streetcar line (#21 Fineview) and for the Nunnery Hill Incline. This funicular railway, which ran from 1888 until 1895, was one of two in the Pittsburgh area that had a curve in it. (The other was the Knoxville Incline on the South Side.)

Fineview has zip codes of both 15212 and 15214 and has representation on Pittsburgh City Council by the council members for District 6 (North Shore and Downtown neighborhoods) and District 1 (North Central neighborhoods). It is within Pittsburgh's 25th ward.

Historical population
Year	Pop.	±%
1910	4,179	—
1920	4,203	+0.6%
1930	4,183	−0.5%
1940	3,960	−5.3%
1950	4,778	+20.7%
1960	4,305	−9.9%
1970	3,183	−26.1%
1980	2,815	−11.6%
1990	1,907	−32.3%
2000	1,751	−8.2%
2010	1,285	−26.6%
2020	1,140	−11.3%
Source: U.S. Census

== History ==
=== 1788–1870: Early settlement ===
On orders from the Supreme Executive Council of the Commonwealth of Pennsylvania, surveyor and Pennsylvania Vice-president David Redick visited the area north of Pittsburgh during the winter of 1788. He reported back to the Supreme Executive Council and its then-president, Benjamin Franklin, on February 19, 1788, warning that the land, including the Fineview area, "abounds with high Hill and deep Hollows, almost inaccessible to a Surveyor. . . . I cannot think that ten acre lotts [sic] on such pitts [sic] and hills will possably [sic] meet with purchasers, unless like a pig in a poke it be kept out of view."

Nuns of the Order of St. Clare ("Poor Clares") became early settlers of the Fineview area in 1828 when they purchased 60 acres for a convent and young women's academy. They completed construction on their institution, St. Clare's Seminary, and began accepting applications in 1829. The seminary consisted of a wood-frame structure that stood at the present-day southern terminus of Belleau Drive. The seminary closed in 1835 following a dispute with the nuns' church superiors. Prior to auctioning the land in 1839, an auctioneer praised the land's "many advantages in point of health, abounding with springs of the purest water, and commanding a view of the City, the Rivers, and surrounding country." The seminary building remained atop its hill until 1881, giving the Fineview area its old nickname, "Nunnery Hill."

The next significant development came under the ownership of banker Thompson Bell, who acquired the same 60 acres in 1847–1848 and began advertising subdivided lots of land for sale in 1849. He had the former St. Clare's Seminary renovated to rent out as a summer home and had a smaller brick house built for himself in 1850–1851 along "Belle Avenue" at the present-day intersection of Mountford Avenue and Belleau Street. In 1854, Bell sold a five-acre tract of land to St. Mary's Parish, whose predominantly German Catholic parishioners worshiped in East Allegheny, for a cemetery. Stonemason and engineer James Andrews bought his first section of "Nunnery Hill" in 1864 and commissioned his Heathside Cottage for the site soon thereafter. Other significant early purchasers include Robert Henderson, who had the Henderson-Metz House built around 1860.

=== 1870–1900: Growth ===
While wealthy residents of Allegheny established country estates on Nunnery Hill in the late 19th century, others put the hilltop area to other uses typical of the rural-urban fringe. Stone quarrying, brick-making, and coal mining occurred throughout the hill. St. Mary's laid the cornerstone for a mortuary chapel at its Nunnery Hill cemetery in 1870. After searching for several years for a "hill district" site for a municipal smallpox hospital ("pest house"), in 1883 the city of Allegheny bought a house and land on Warren Street for this purpose.

Still, new private and public sector services encouraged settlement of Nunnery Hill in the 1870s and 1880s. The Twelfth Ward school district bought land for a new school on Willis Street (now Meadville Street) in 1877, which opened to students within the next several years. The city built a pumping station at Howard Street in 1882 to pump water along the present-day location of the Rising Main steps to tanks (and later a reservoir) atop Nunnery Hill. But no improvement accelerated speculation and homebuilding so much as the Nunnery Hill Incline, completed in 1888. The curved incline carried passengers from the present-day intersection of Henderson Street and Federal Street to its terminus on Meadville Street. (The old retaining wall that was built for the incline can still be seen running up the side of Henderson Street.)

Other developments during the late 19th century included the founding in 1880 of a "Home for Colored Orphans," located for a few short years at the intersection of Fountain Street and Sandusky Street; demolition of the old St. Clare's Seminary in 1881 to make way for James Andrews' second and final Nunnery Hill residence, Ingleside Place; installation of a sewer system; establishment of the McNaugher Memorial United Presbyterian Mission, in 1896; forming of a Nunnery Hill Athletic Association; and opening of at least one grocery store.

By the time the Nunnery Hill Inclined Plane Company closed its titular funicular in 1895, due to safety concerns, the area it had served had transformed over the previous century from an "inferior," "inaccessible" hillside, per surveyor David Redick, into an urban neighborhood of such a size that could support a school, a church, a baseball team, and two grocery stores.

=== 1900–1950: Organization and stability ===
New institutions, organizations, and services accrued in Fineview in the first half of the 20th century. Despite challenges involving public health, housing, and abandonment, the neighborhood's population remained relatively stable during this period.

The McNaugher Memorial Mission, which had begun in 1896 in a home on Pilsen Street, built a church on Parkview Avenue (Catoma Street) in 1900, adding a yellow-brick facade and bell tower in 1907. That same year, classes began at a new school located on Fineview Avenue. The Pittsburgh Railways Company began operation of its Nunnery Hill streetcar line months later, on March 31, 1908, ending the neighborhood's 13-year transit drought. The City of Pittsburgh built a fire station to house Engine No. 59, a horse-drawn fire engine, around 1912. And in 1915 the Nunnery Hill Board of Trade (organized the previous year) successfully lobbied the Pittsburgh City Council to discard the neighborhood's old, irrelevant name — the "nunnery" being long gone — in favor of a title that might boost local real estate and business activity: Fineview.

But not all in Fineview was necessarily "fine" during this period of social organization and improvement. Ailing Allegheny City residents strained the Municipal Hospital on Warren Street during a smallpox epidemic in 1903. Dozens died at the hospital, which remained at or near capacity during the outbreak.

Though Fineview's hilltops were crowned with mansions and middle-class homes, bunched-up tenements hugged its hillsides. As one report later described such housing, alongside a photograph of Fineview's Henderson and Fountain Streets: "rambling structures grafted to hillsides, no outdoor play-spaces except vertical ones." One such row of tenements, "Rafferty's Row," stood alongside a staircase connecting Fountain Street and Henderson Street, housing 50 people, 34 of them Black, as of the 1900 census. Evictions were common; a neighbor later recalled that a constable would accompany the tenements' owner for weekly rent collection. A fire destroyed the wood-frame row in 1907, leaving more than a dozen Black families homeless.

Another neighborhood landmark met its demise soon thereafter: the mortuary chapel in the former St. Mary's Cemetery. Two decades after the church had abandoned the site, the secluded, crumbling chapel became an ideal spot for boxing matches, chicken fights, and card games. The chapel was razed in 1913.

This simultaneous improvement and abandonment continued in Fineview over the next few decades. The community dedicated a war memorial at the intersection of Meadville Street and Catoma Street in 1919, and then learned of the closure of its ten-year-old fire station three years later. The Fineview Board of Trade built a new grandstand at their baseball field (home of the "Highlanders") in 1923; by the end of the decade, the estate overlooking the ballpark, the Andrews family's Ingleside Place, was vacant.

Ingleside Place sat empty and weather-beaten until 1941, when the Housing Authority of the City of Pittsburgh chose the estate as the site of its fifth low-income housing project, Allegheny Dwellings. By the time applications for its 282 apartments opened in July 1942, war had intervened, and the project had been reclassified as being for defense workers first, low-income families second. Allegheny Dwellings' first residents began moving in on December 15, 1942. 988 people lived there by 1944, 791 of whom were white and 197 of whom were Black. The single largest age group were those under five years old. Between 1940 and 1950, the population of the census tract comprising much of Fineview (25C) grew from 1,654 to 2,688, an increase of 1,034 people. Allegheny Dwellings accounted for approximately 96 percent of that growth, Fineview's last through the present day.

== Surrounding neighborhoods ==
Fineview has four borders with the Pittsburgh neighborhoods of Perry South to the north and west, Central Northside to the southwest, East Allegheny to the south and Spring Hill–City View to the east.

== City steps ==
Seventeen distinct flights of city steps connect pedestrians to public transportation and provide an easy way to travel through this hilly area. Rising Main Avenue, located in the eastern side of the neighborhood, includes the fourth longest flight of city steps in Pittsburgh (331 steps). The flight is open to the public but has suffered structural damage in places due to erosion of the hillside. Since 1996, the Fineview Citizens Council has sponsored the Fineview Step Challenge, a five-mile race that utilizes all of the neighborhood's active sets of steps.

== Notable people ==
Notable individuals who were born in or lived in Fineview include:

- James Andrews (1825–1897), Scottish-American stonemason, civil engineer, builder of the Heathside Cottage.
- Luke Ravenstahl (born 1980), American politician, member of Pittsburgh City Council, 59th Mayor of Pittsburgh.
- Harvey O'Connor (1897-1987) and Jessie Lloyd O'Connor (1904-1988), labor journalists and political activists.
- Earl Carroll (1893–1948), American theatrical producer, director, songwriter, composer.
- Richard Foster (1919–2002), American architect.
- Tom Atkins (born 1935), American actor.
- Milan Getting (1878–1951), Slovak-American journalist, diplomat, signatory of the Pittsburgh Agreement.

== In popular culture ==
- Alex's bike ride during the Flashdance title sequence begins in Fineview. She pets a cat at the intersection of Catoma Street and Warren Street before biking down Warren Street. She then makes the hairpin turn from Henderson Street onto Fountain Street.

== Gallery ==
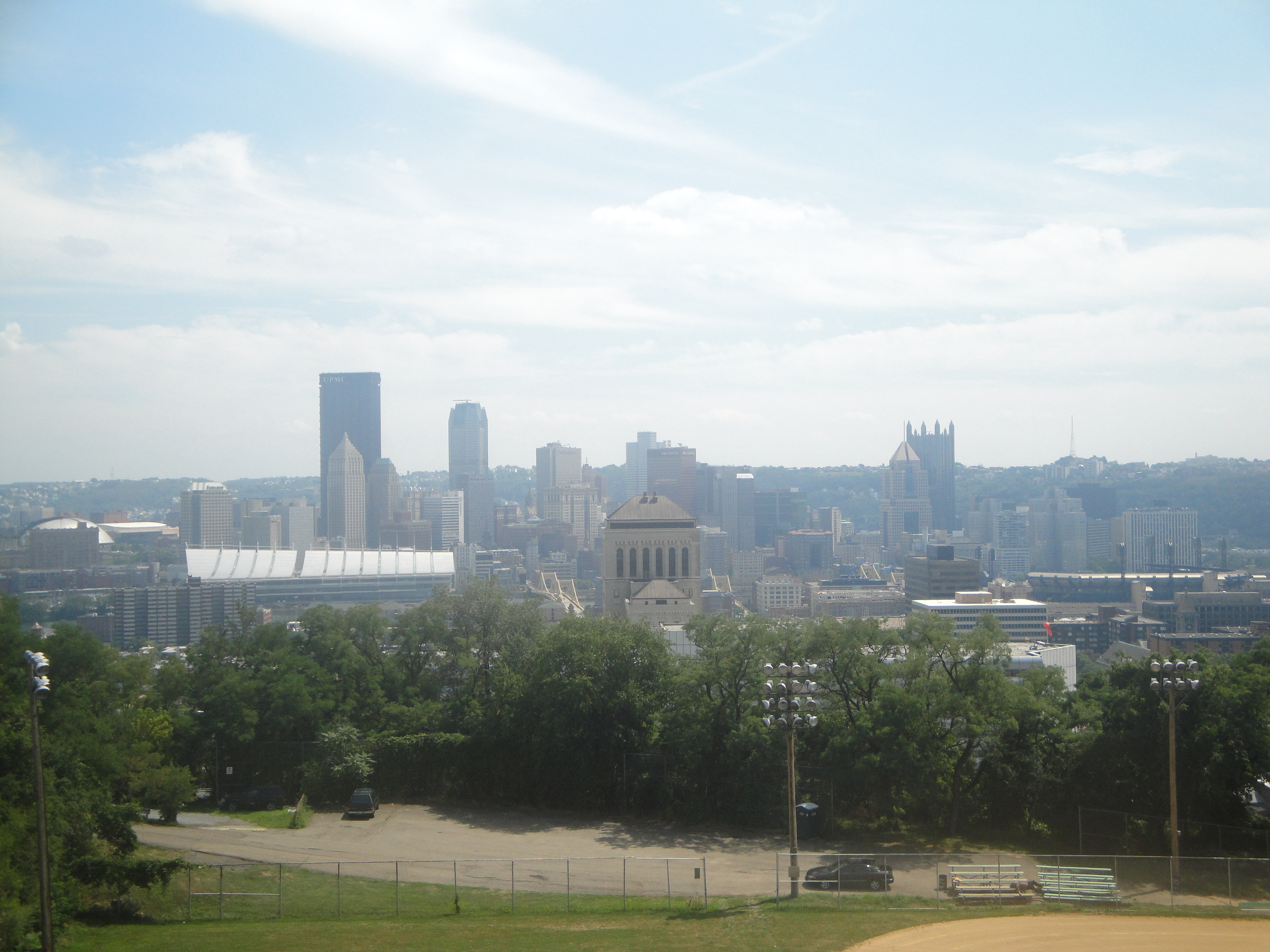
Downtown Pittsburgh from the Fineview Overlook.

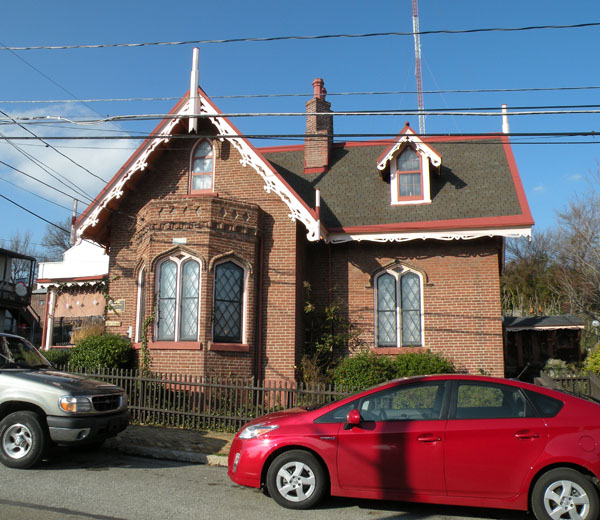
Heathside Cottage, built circa 1855 to 1860, at 416 Catoma Street.

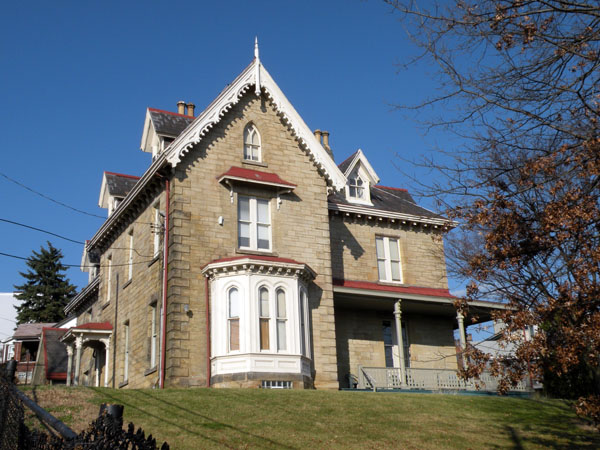
Henderson-Metz House, built circa 1860, at 1516 Warren Street.

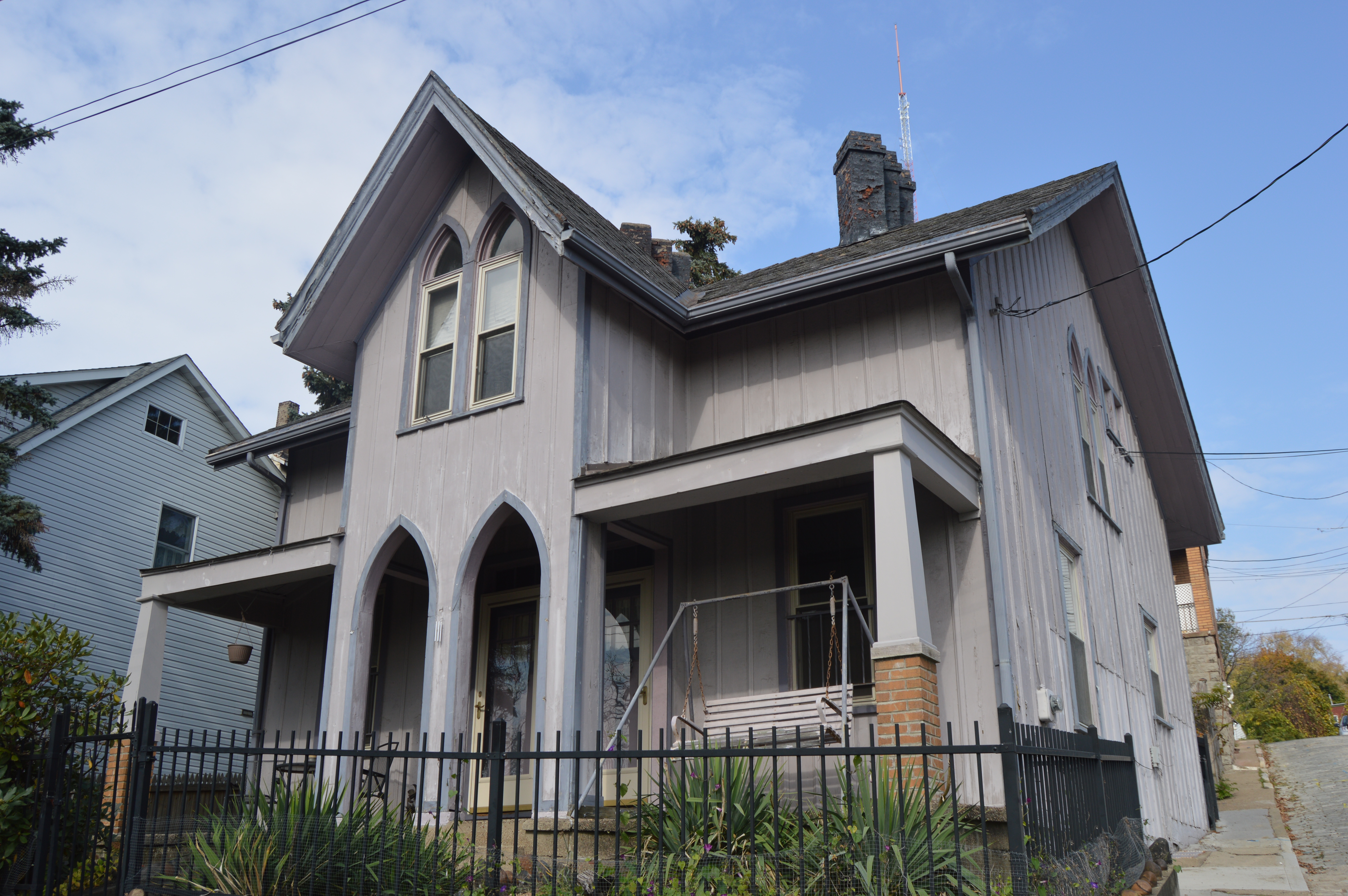
Carpenter Gothic house located at Warren Street and Lee Street.

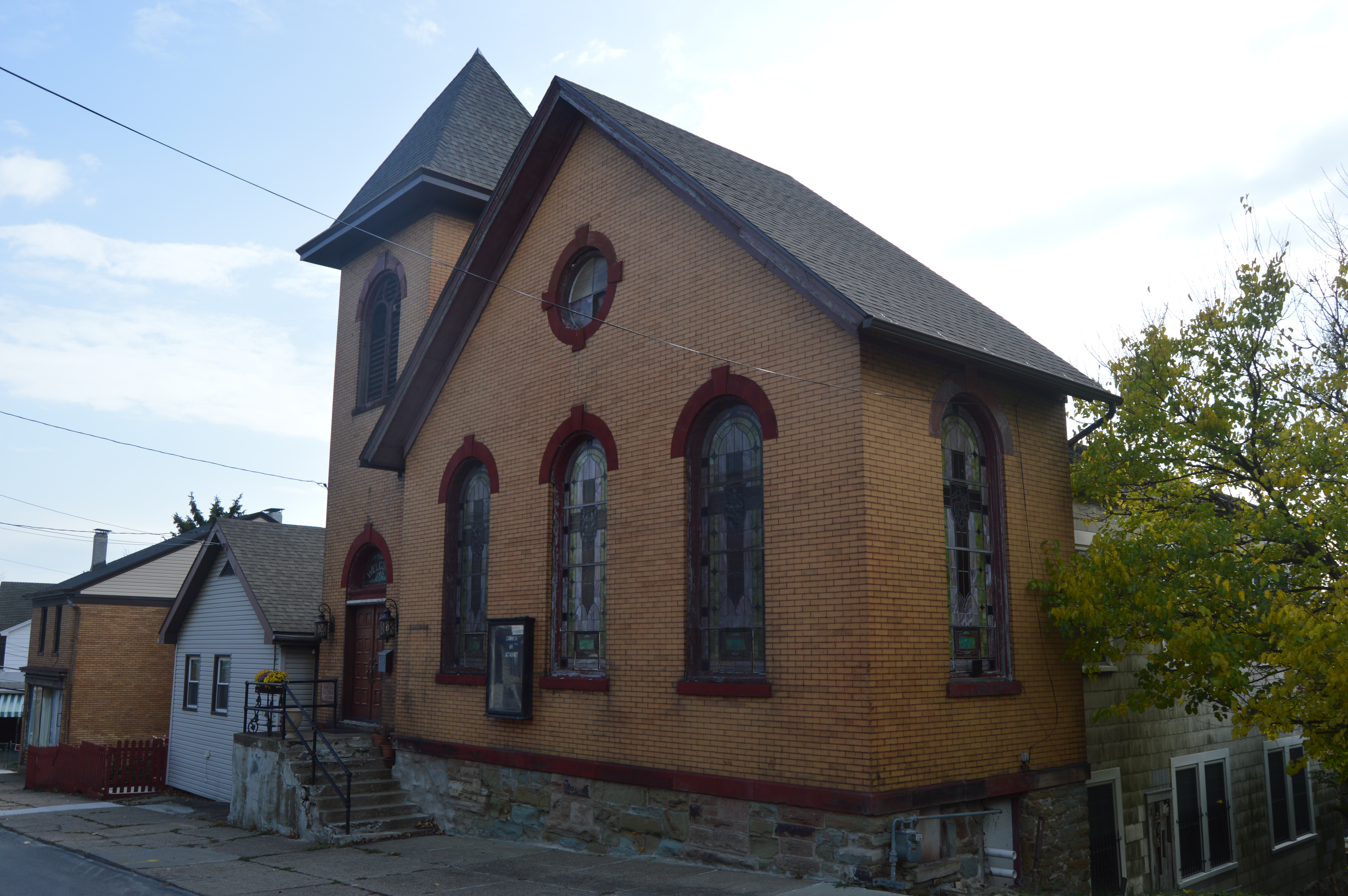
The former McNaugher Memorial United Presbyterian Church, at 431 Catoma Street.

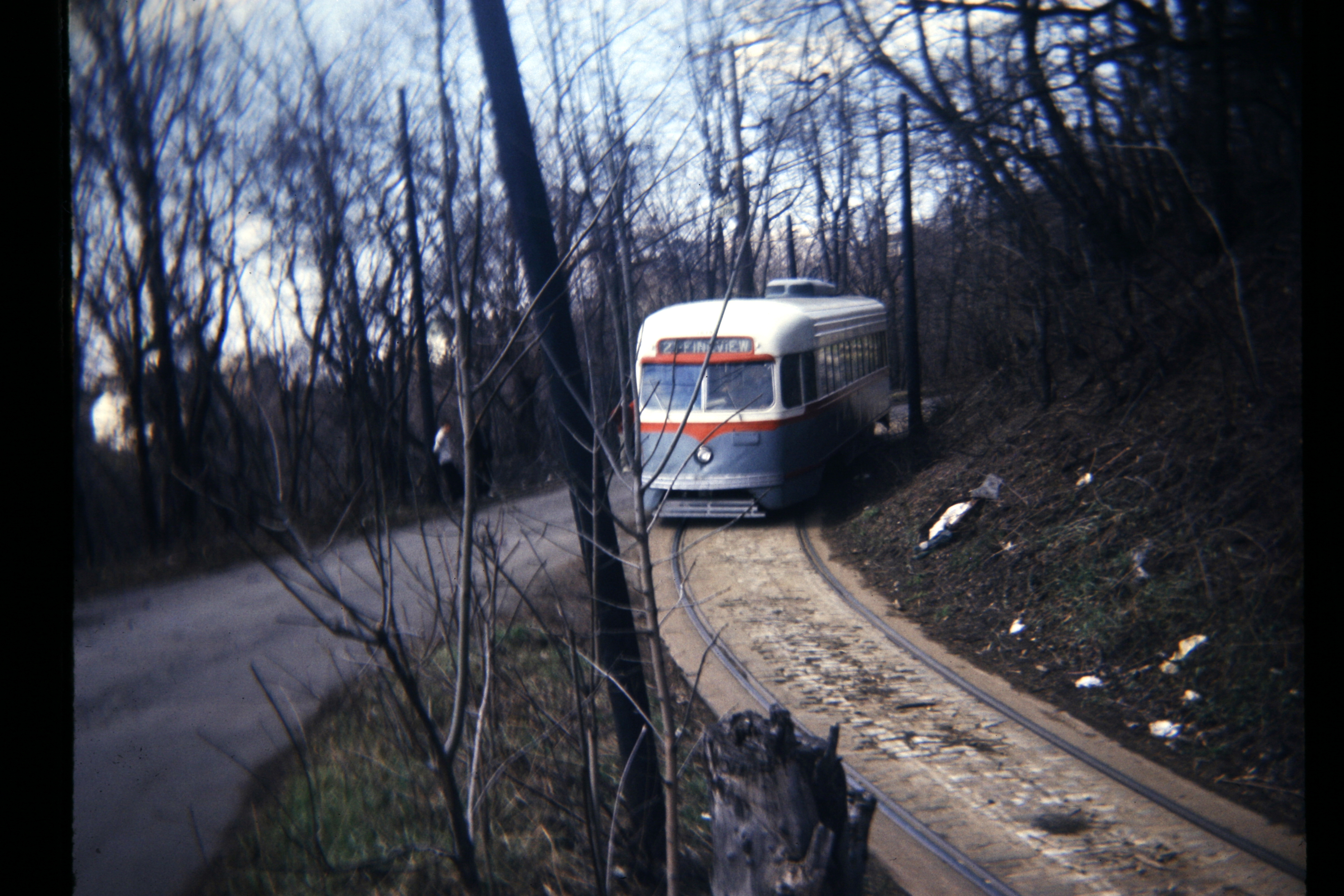
No. 21 Fineview streetcar rounds the curve on Hazelton Street.

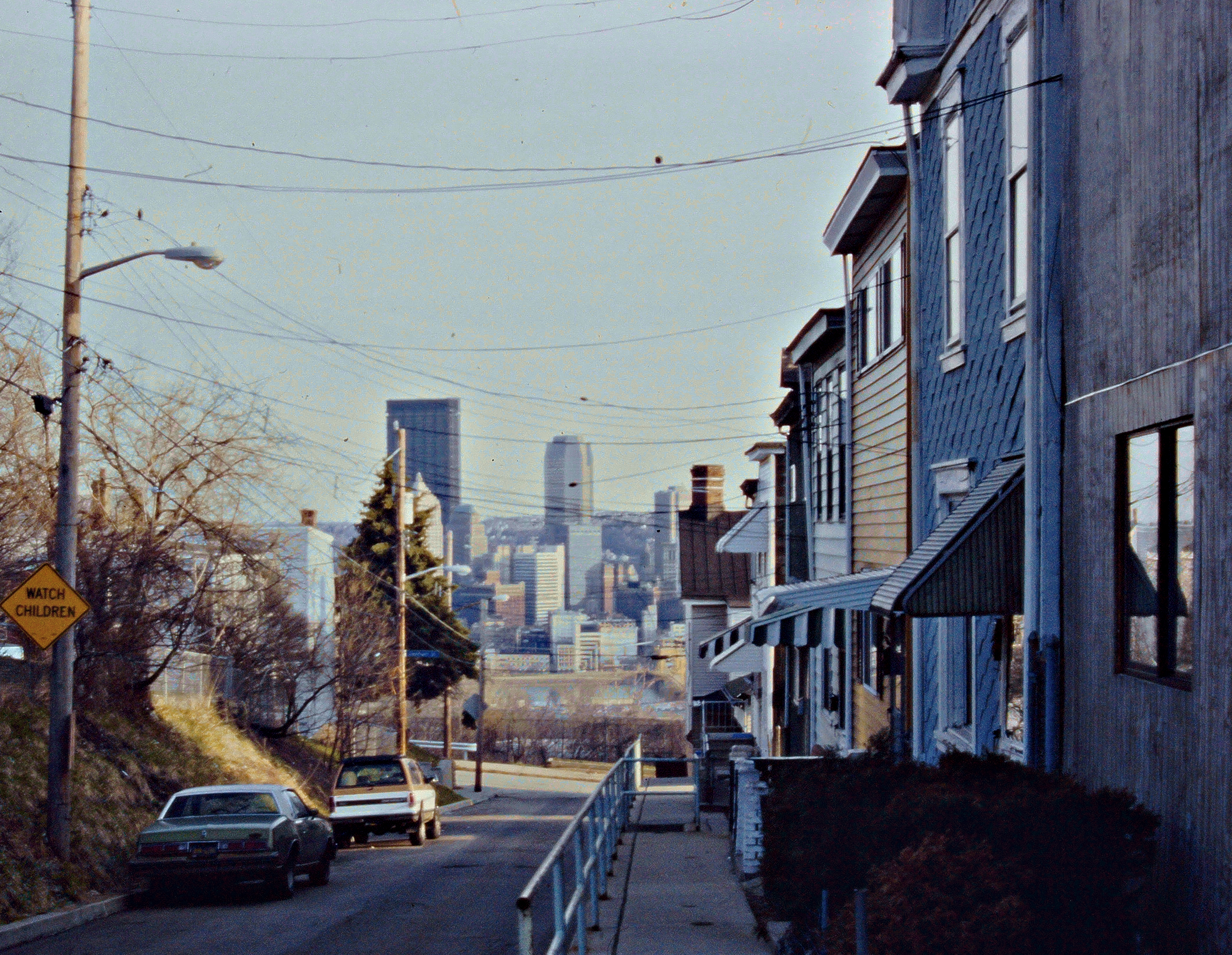
Lanark Street in 1994.

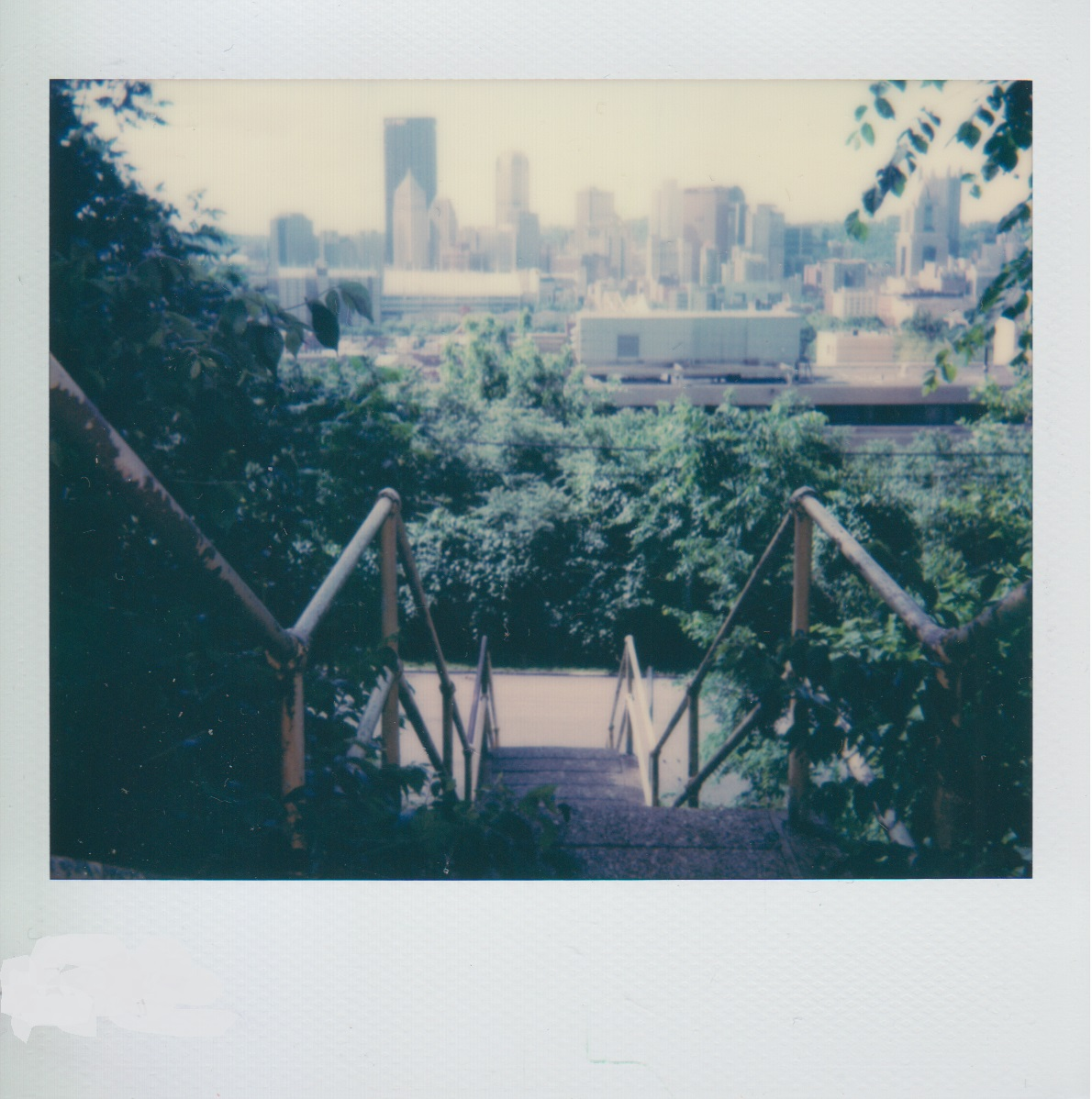
City steps connecting Fountain Street to Graib Street.

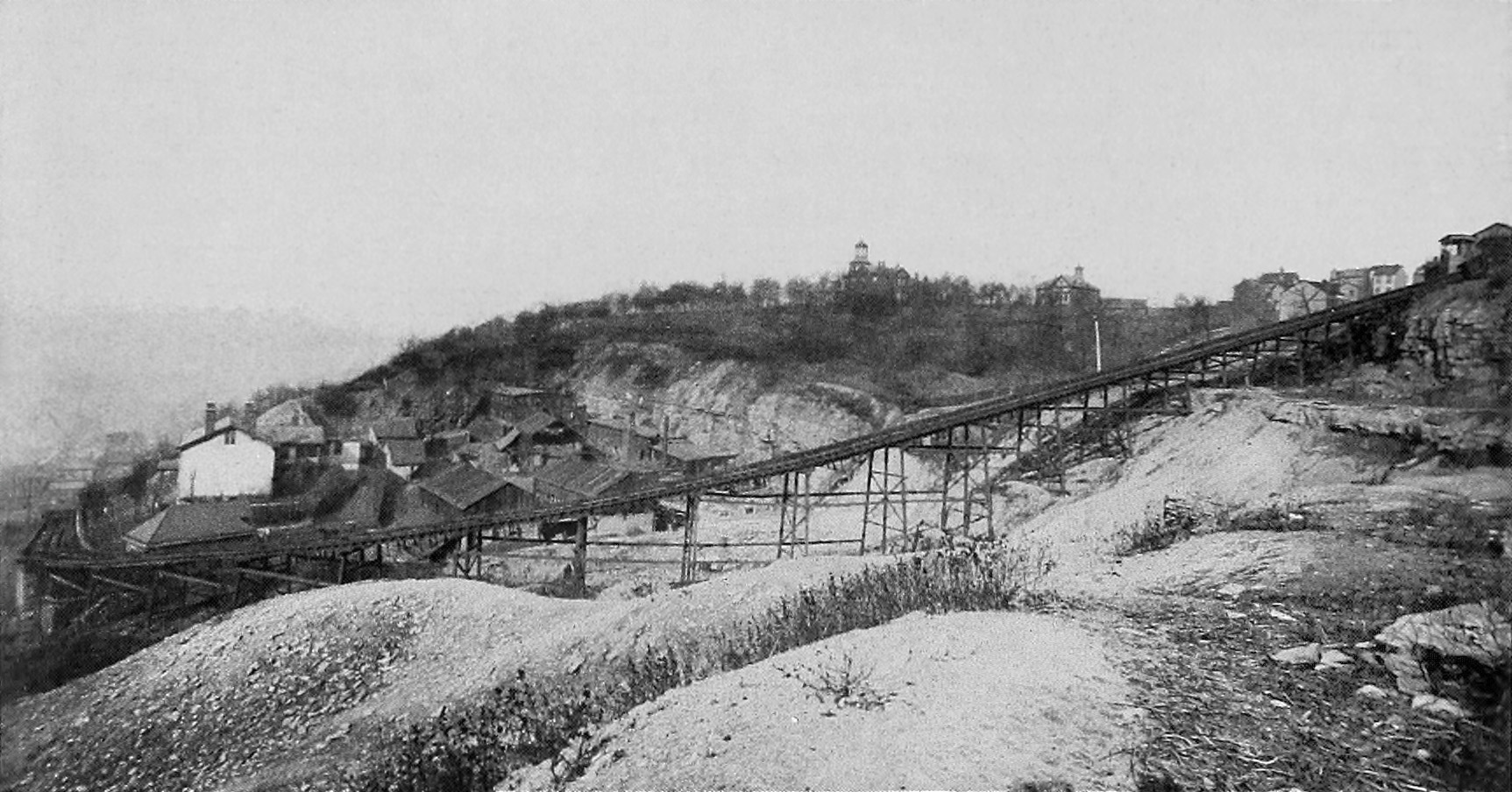
The Nunnery Hill Incline circa 1897.

== See also ==
- List of Pittsburgh neighborhoods
