= Nicholson Township, Fayette County, Pennsylvania =

Township in Pennsylvania, United States

Coordinates: 39°50′00″N 79°52′59″W

Nicholson Township
- Township
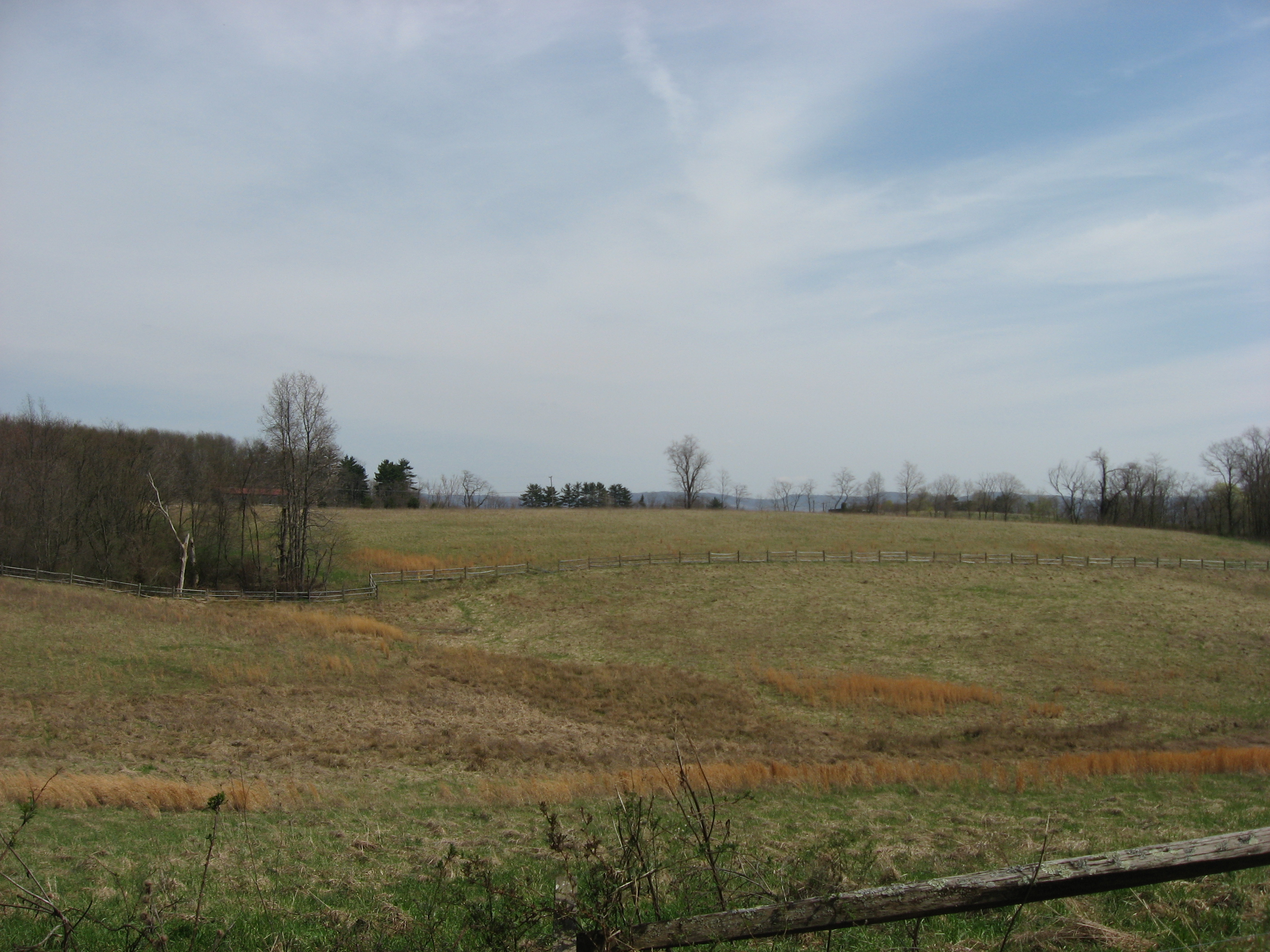
- Fields on Old Frame Road, the Deffenbaugh Site

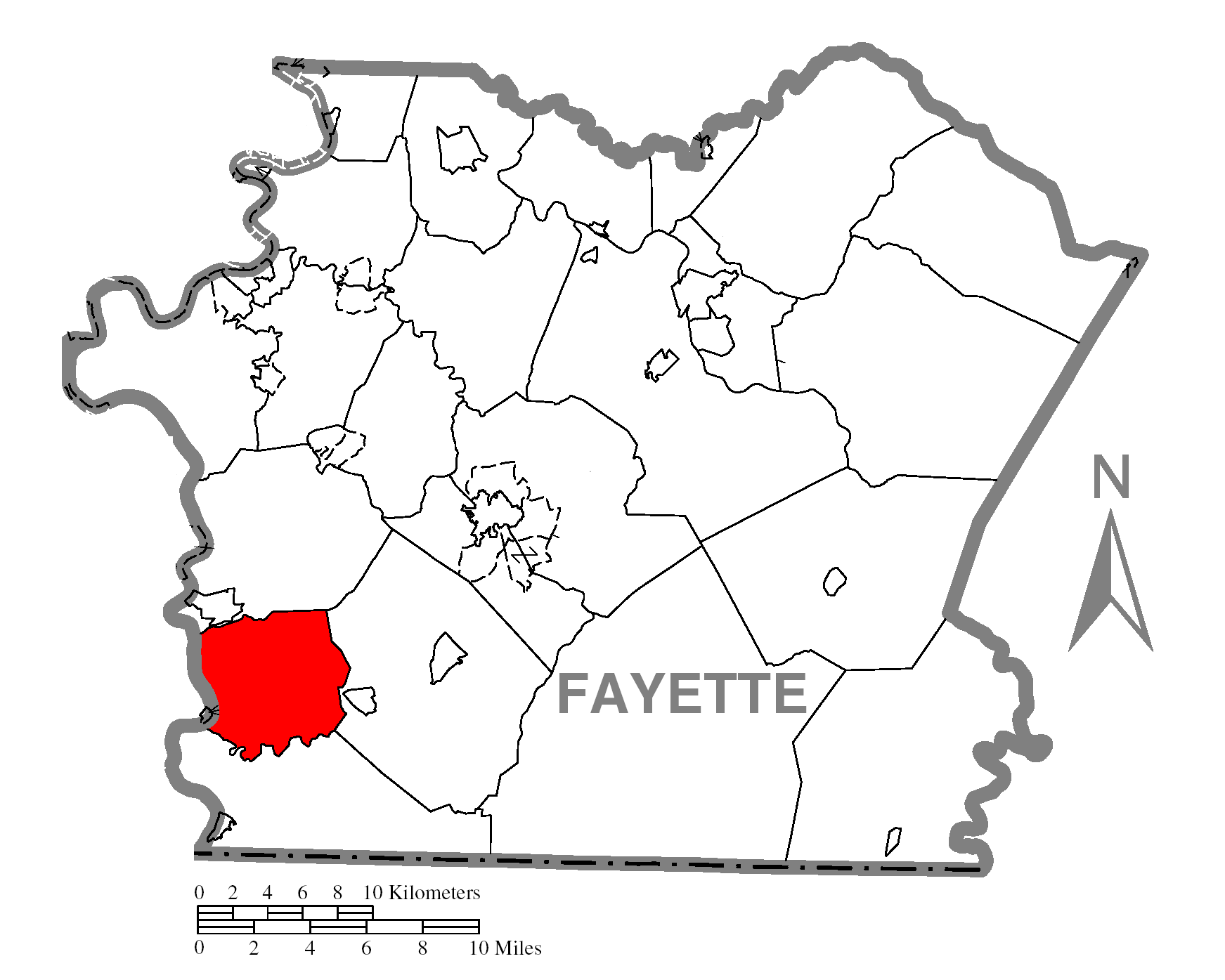
- Location of Nicholson Township in Fayette County

- Location of Fayette County in Pennsylvania
- Country: United States
- State: Pennsylvania
- County: Fayette

Area
  - Total: 21.97 sq mi (56.90 km^{2})
  - Land: 21.81 sq mi (56.49 km^{2})
  - Water: 0.16 sq mi (0.41 km^{2})

Population (2020)
  - Total: 1,730 ▼
  - Estimate (2022): 1,690
  - Density: 80.2/sq mi (30.96/km^{2})
- Time zone: UTC-4 (EST)
  - Summer (DST): UTC-5 (EDT)
- Area code: 724
- FIPS code: 42-051-54392

Nicholson Township is a township in Fayette County, Pennsylvania, United States. The population was 1,730 at the 2020 census, a decline from the figure of 1,805 tabulated in 2010. The Albert Gallatin Area School District serves the township. New Geneva, Martin, Gallatin, Old Frame, Bowood, Woodside, and Grays Landing are communities in the township.

== History ==
Nicholson Township was created in 1853 from portions of Springhill Township, German Township, and Georges Township, all of which are also located within Fayette County. Southern Nicholson Township is the location of an archaeological site, the Deffenbaugh Site. Once occupied by a Monongahela village, the site is listed on the National Register of Historic Places. The village of New Geneva was laid out by Albert Gallatin, Secretary of the Treasury during the Jefferson Administration. The New Geneva Historic District was listed on the National Register of Historic Places in 1996.

== Geography ==
The township is in southwestern Fayette County, with its western border following the Monongahela River, which forms the Greene County line. The southern border of the township follows Georges Creek, a tributary of the Monongahela. Pennsylvania Route 166 crosses the western side of the township, following the Monongahela; the road leads north to Masontown and south to Point Marion.

According to the United States Census Bureau, Nicholson Township has a total area of 22.0 square miles (56.9 km^{2}), of which 21.8 square miles (56.5 km^{2}) is land and 0.2 square miles (0.4 km^{2}), or 0.73%, is water.

== Demographics ==
Historical population
| Census | Pop. | Note | %± |
|---|---|---|---|
| 2010 | 1,805 | | — |
| 2020 | 1,730 | | −4.2% |
| 2022 (est.) | 1,690 | | −2.3% |
U.S. Decennial Census

As of the 2000 census, there were 1,989 people, 737 households, and 577 families residing in the township. The population density was 90.9 inhabitants per square mile (35.1/km^{2}). There were 777 housing units at an average density of 35.5 per square mile (13.7/km^{2}). The racial makeup of the township was 98.34% White, 0.40% African American, 0.15% Native American, 0.10% Asian, and 1.01% from two or more races. Hispanic or Latino of any race were 0.90% of the population.

There were 737 households, out of which 35.7% had children under the age of 18 living with them, 61.9% were married couples living together, 10.2% had a female householder with no husband present, and 21.6% were non-families. 19.7% of all households were made up of individuals, and 9.9% had someone living alone who was 65 years of age or older. The average household size was 2.70 and the average family size was 3.04.

In the township the population was spread out, with 25.2% under the age of 18, 7.3% from 18 to 24, 29.6% from 25 to 44, 24.5% from 45 to 64, and 13.4% who were 65 years of age or older. The median age was 39 years. For every 100 females, there were 99.5 males. For every 100 females age 18 and over, there were 98.9 males.

The median income for a household in the township was $29,279, and the median income for a family was $33,125. Males had a median income of $30,985 versus $23,403 for females. The per capita income for the township was $13,568. About 14.6% of families and 17.6% of the population were below the poverty line, including 24.6% of those under age 18 and 11.5% of those age 65 or over.

== Government ==
Nicholson Township is governed by a Board of Supervisors duly elected by the citizens of the township with offices at the Nicholson Township Building located at 142 Woodside-Old Frame Road in Smithfield. The current Township Supervisors are John Black of Old Frame, Jack Arndt, of Jacobs Creek Road, and Richard Jarrett, of Boy Scout Road. Said supervisors serve staggered six-year terms. The Township Engineer is Pole Star Engineering located in Uniontown, and the Township Solicitor is Douglas Sholtis, a resident of the township.

== Notable person ==
Isaac Griffin (1756–1827), a politician who represented Pennsylvania in the U.S. House of Representatives, made his home in Nicholson Township. He is buried within the boundaries of the township, but the site of his grave is now unknown.
