= Housing Authority of the City of Pittsburgh =

- HACP

Public Housing Authority overview
- Type: Public Housing Authority
- Jurisdiction: Pittsburgh, Pennsylvania, USA
- Headquarters: 200 Ross Street; Pittsburgh, Pennsylvania 15217
- Motto: Your Housing of Choice
- Website: www.hacp.org

Map
- City of Pittsburgh in Allegheny County, Pennsylvania

The Housing Authority of the City of Pittsburgh (HACP) was created in 1937 under the U.S. Housing Act of 1937 to establish public housing within the city limits. HACP was the first housing authority in the Commonwealth of Pennsylvania and one of the first in the United States.

== History ==
- Bedford Dwellings was the authority's first Housing Project, approved by President Franklin D. Roosevelt in 1938
- Scattered Sites were established in the late 1960s, creating culturally diverse housing locations within the city's neighborhoods.
- The authority's security force, later becoming an official police department, was established in 1974, after an extremely high increase of crime at the authority's Housing sites
- In the 1980s two closed city schools were refurbished into senior housing.

== Housing sites ==
HACP operates seven Family Communities as well as eleven Senior/Disabled/High Rise Communities. Also the authority oversees eight privately managed communities throughout the city.

=== Family communities ===
Community Name	Neighborhood	# Units	# ADA Units
Addison Terrace	Hill District	734	3
Allegheny Dwellings	North Side	271	14
Arlington Heights	South Side	143	8
Bedford Dwellings	Hill District	411	21
Glen Hazel	Hazelwood	127	7
Homewood North	Homewood	134	8
Northview Heights	North Side	488	21

=== Senior/disabled communities ===
Community Name	Neighborhood	# Units	# ADA Units
Caligiuri Plaza	Allentown	104	10
Carrick Regency	Carrick	66	4
Finello Pavilion	Oakland	60	6
Glen Hazel High-Rise	Hazelwood	97	16
Gualteri Manor	Beechview	30	2
Mazza Pavilion	Brookline	16	2
Morse Gardens	South Side	70	4
Murray Towers	Squirrel Hill	67	4
Northview Heights High-Rise	North Side	87	5
Pennsylvania-Bidwell	North Side	120	20
Pressley Street	North Side	211	16

=== Privately managed communities ===
Community Name	Neighborhood
Garfield Commons	Garfield
Bedford Hill	Hill District
Oak Hill	Oakland
Manchester	Manchester
New Pennley Place	East Liberty
Christopher A. Smith Terrace	Hill District
The Commons at North Aiken	Garfield
Silver Lake Commons	Homewood
Fairmont Apartments	Garfield
The Legacy Apartments	Hill District

== American Recovery and Reinvestment Act of 2009 ==
In 2009, as part of the American and Reinvestment Act, HACP received $27 million in the form of a Recovery Act Public Housing Capital Fund Formula Grant as well as created 107 Jobs. $21 million of these funds were used to make units up to code with the Uniform Federal Accessibility Standards (UFAS). The other projects used with ARARA Funding, included:

- An authority physical needs assessment ($170,000)
- Replacement of the Fire Alarm System at Bedford Dwellings ($1 Million)
- Acquisition of Scattered Sites and Accessible Homes ($2.6 Million)
- Roof Replacements at Addison Hall and Northview Heights High Rise ($618,000)
- Renovation to the elevators at Gualtieri Manor ($152,000)
- administrative costs: ($1.2 Million)

== See also ==
- List of public housing authorities in Pennsylvania
