= La Prima Espresso Company =

American coffee roasting company

- Industry: Coffeehouse and Coffee roaster
- Founded: Pittsburgh, Pennsylvania (October 1, 1988)
- Headquarters: Pittsburgh, Pennsylvania
- Products: Coffee
- Owner: Sam Patti
- Website: laprima.com

La Prima Espresso is a coffee roaster formerly on Smallman Street in Strip District neighborhood of Pittsburgh, Pennsylvania, United States. In 2013, the roasting operation moved to a 4,000 square foot building 1500 Chateau Street in Manchester on the North Side. It is considered to be one of the "powerhouse local brands" in Pittsburgh. In addition to the 205 Twenty-first Street retail operation, La Prima operates two satellite locations at Carnegie Mellon University—one in Wean Hall and another in the Gates Hillman Centers. Its coffee is also available in other local coffee shops. There had previously been a location near PPG Place. It offers organic options and is fair trade certified. As of 2008, it had remained the only such coffee roaster in Pittsburgh.

Owner Sam Patti opened La Prima on October 1, 1988. It also sells and repairs coffee equipment. In 2008, Patti opened Crêpes Napoleon and Josephine, a cafe with seating for 35, at 2107 Penn Avenue in the Strip District. The original location for the roasting operation had been in the long terminal building on the Allegheny River side of Smallman Street, along with the retail operation.
