= Hoene-Werle House =

Historic house in Pennsylvania, United States

- U.S. National Register of Historic Places
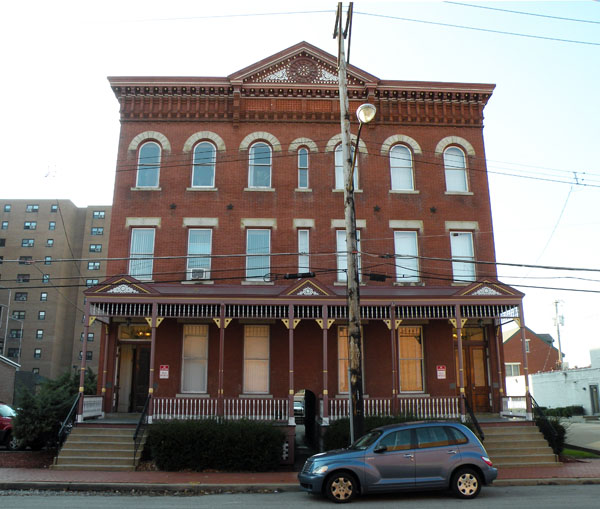

- Location within Pittsburgh Location within Pennsylvania Location within the United States
- Location: 1313-1315 Allegheny Ave., Pittsburgh, Pennsylvania
- Coordinates: 40°27′5″N 80°0′59″W
- Area: 0.2 acres (0.081 ha)
- Built: 1887
- NRHP reference No.: 84000533
- Added to NRHP: November 15, 1984

The Hoene-Werle House, which is located in the Manchester neighborhood of Pittsburgh, Pennsylvania, was built in 1887 as a double house with a courtyard in the rear and a complex molded brick and millwork cornice in the front.

It was listed on the National Register of Historic Places in 1984. It is also part of the Manchester Historic District

== History and architectural features ==
German immigrants Herman H. Hoene, who owned a retail piano store, and Fred H. Werle, a druggist, originally owned the house.

The house was abandoned then acquired by the city in the 1970s and then bought in the 1980s and restored.

The Hoene-Werle House was listed on the National Register of Historic Places in 1984. It is also part of the Manchester Historic District

== See also ==
- Emmanuel Episcopal Church (Pittsburgh, Pennsylvania) - church designed by Henry Hobson Richardson located two blocks south on Allegheny Avenue.
