= Chalfant Hall =

Historic site in Pennsylvania, US

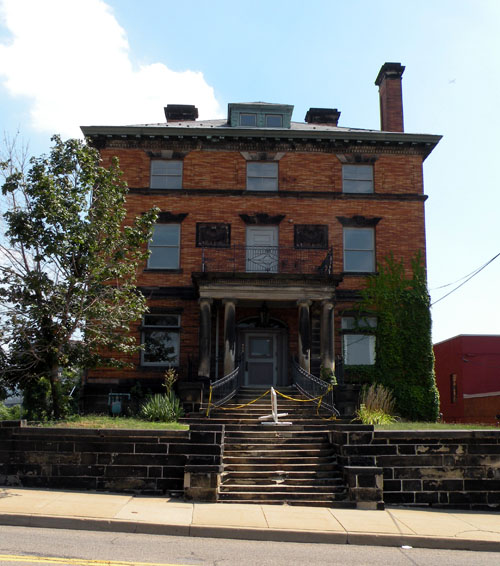

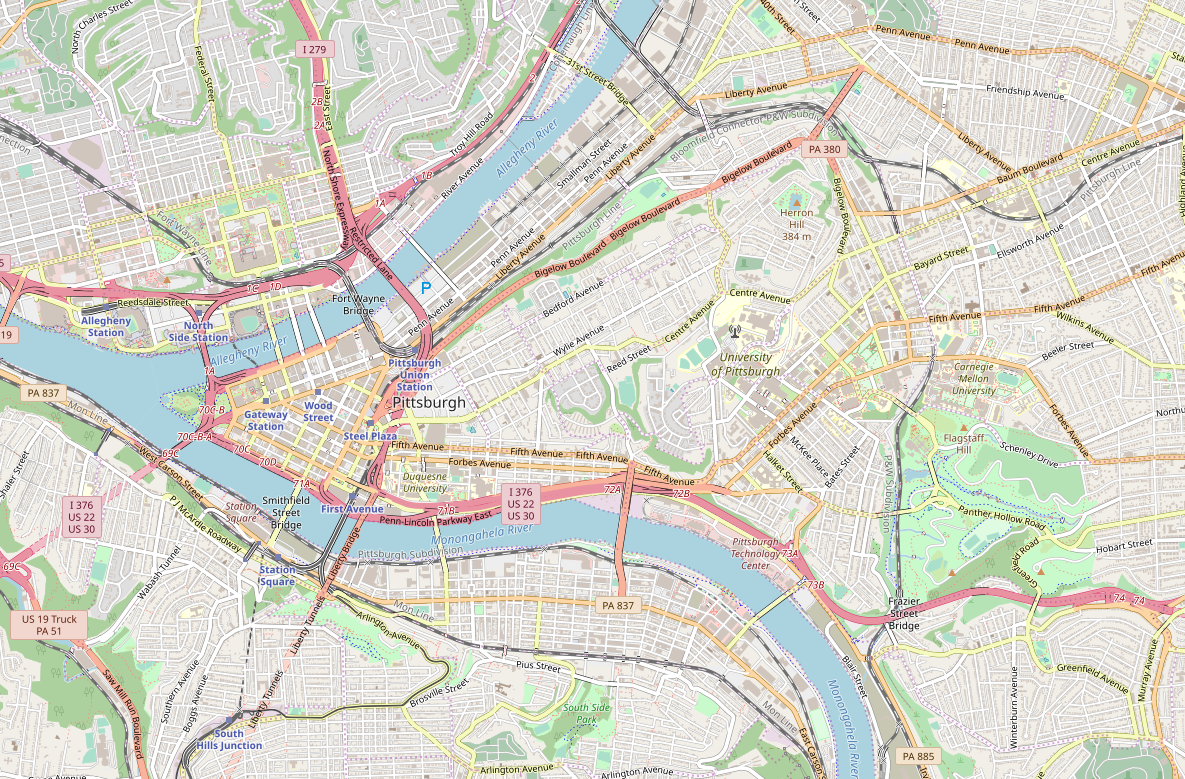
- Location of Chalfant Hall in Downtown Pittsburgh
- 40°26′59.16″N 80°0′59.83″W
- Location: 915 Ridge Avenue (Allegheny West), Pittsburgh, Pennsylvania, USA

History
- Built: circa 1900

Pittsburgh Landmark – PHLF
- Designated: 1981

Chalfant Hall of the Community College of Allegheny County (CCAC), located at 915 Ridge Avenue in the Allegheny West neighborhood of Pittsburgh, Pennsylvania, was built circa 1900. It was the former house of Henry Chalfant (1867–1928), who graduated from Harvard in 1899 and succeeded his father in the firm of Spang, Chalfant & Co. The house was added to the List of Pittsburgh History and Landmarks Foundation Historic Landmarks in 1981. CCAC acquired the property the same year.

In 2019, CCAC announced that Chalfant Hall would be renovated to become the college's new Center for Teaching and Learning.
