= Allegheny West (Pittsburgh) =

- Neighborhood
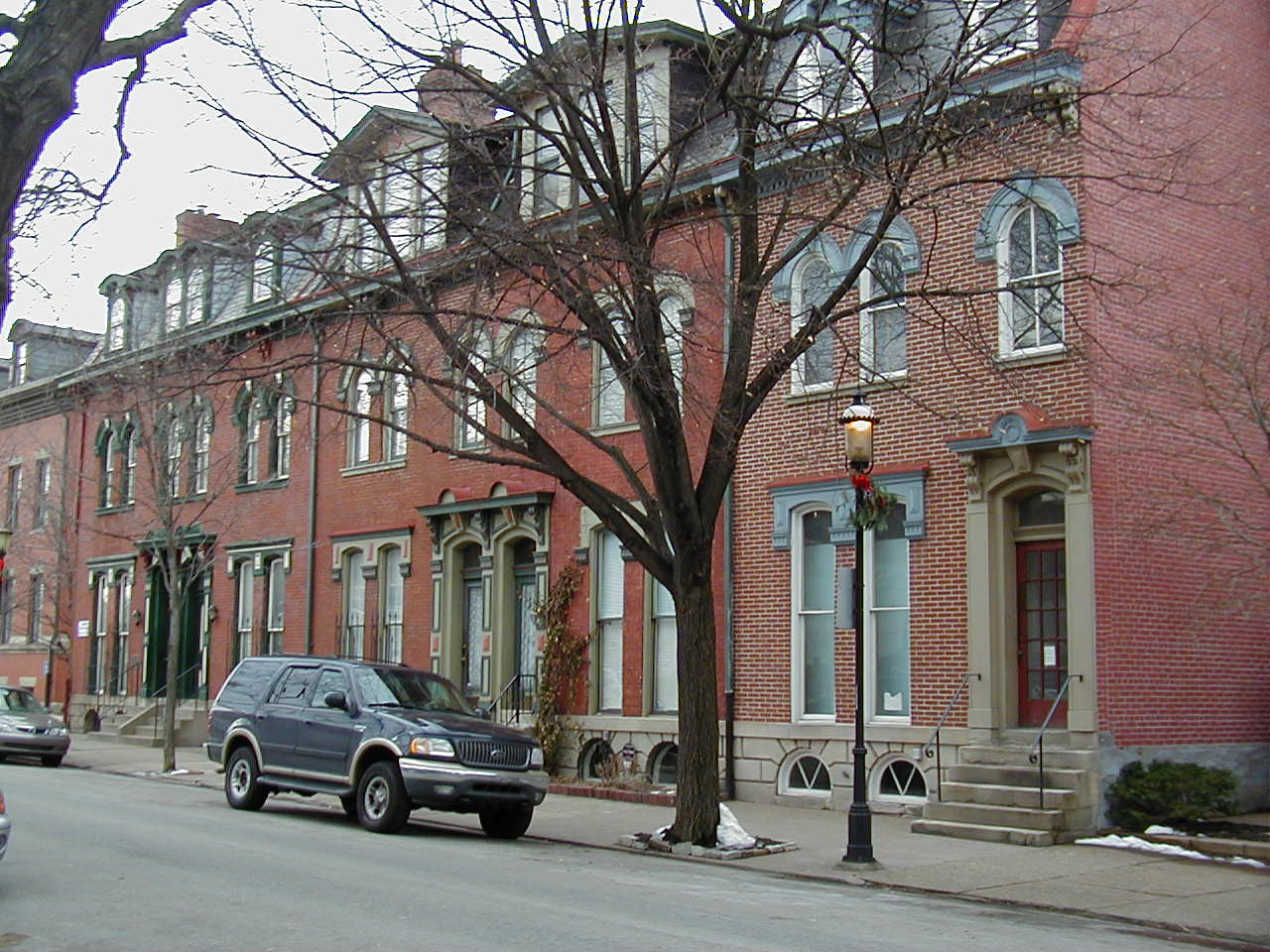
- Victorian housing of Allegheny West

- Location of Allegheny West in Pittsburgh
- Coordinates: 40°27′7.50″N 80°0′56.79″W
- Country: United States
- State: Pennsylvania
- City: Pittsburgh

Area
  - Total: 0.141 sq mi (0.37 km^{2})

Population (2010)
  - Total: 462
- ZIP code: 15212, 15233
- Allegheny West Historic District
- U.S. National Register of Historic Places
- U.S. Historic district
- City of Pittsburgh Historic District
- Pittsburgh Landmark – PHLF
- Location within Pittsburgh Location within Pennsylvania Location within the United States
- Area: 43 acres (17 ha). Roughly bounded by Brighton Road, Jabok Way, Ridge and Allegheny Avenues.
- Architectural style: Late Victorian
- NRHP reference No.: 78002334

Significant dates
- Added to NRHP: November 2, 1978
- Designated CPHD: November 26, 1990
- Designated PHLF: 1997

Allegheny West is a historic neighborhood in Pittsburgh, Pennsylvania's North Side. The Pittsburgh Historic Review Commission voted in favor of designating the neighborhood as a city historic district in September 1989.

The neighborhood has two zip codes of both 15233 and 15212, and has representation on Pittsburgh City Council by the council member for District 1 (North Side).

== History ==
The area was frequented by Native Americans until late in the 18th century. In 1787 David Redick began a survey of the area, with land to be given to Continental soldiers as part of their pay for service in the American Revolution. In 1788 lots in the area were auctioned off in Philadelphia. Houses were first built in the district in 1846-47 and streets were laid out about the same time. In the 1860s there was another boom in housing construction.

In the late 19th century Ridge Avenue became known as "Millionaire's Row" with mansions built for Henry W. Oliver, William Penn Snyder, Harmar Denny, Alexander M. Byers, and others. Lincoln Avenue also became known for its mansions.

The neighborhood is the birthplace of Gertrude Stein.

== Gallery ==
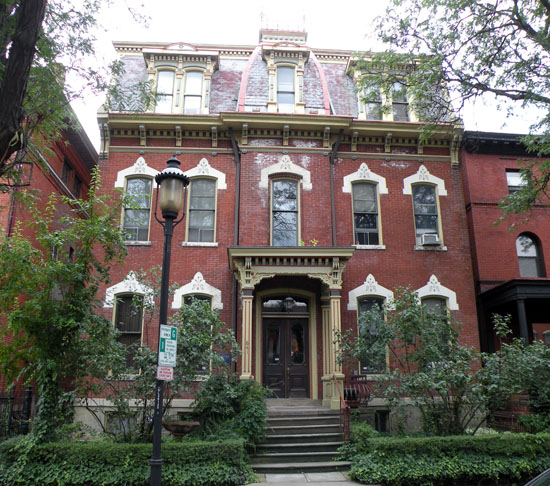
841 North Lincoln Avenue, built in 1878.

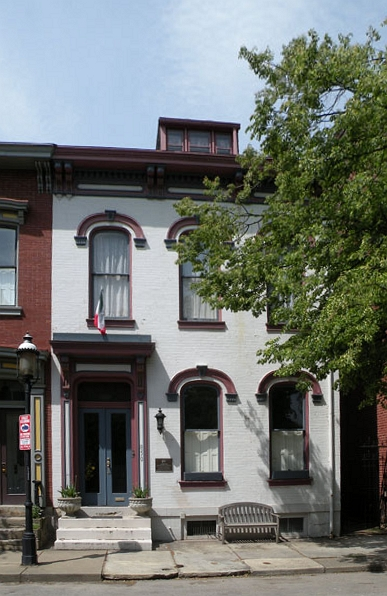
Gertrude Stein's birthplace (February 3, 1874) and childhood home, at 850 Beech Avenue.

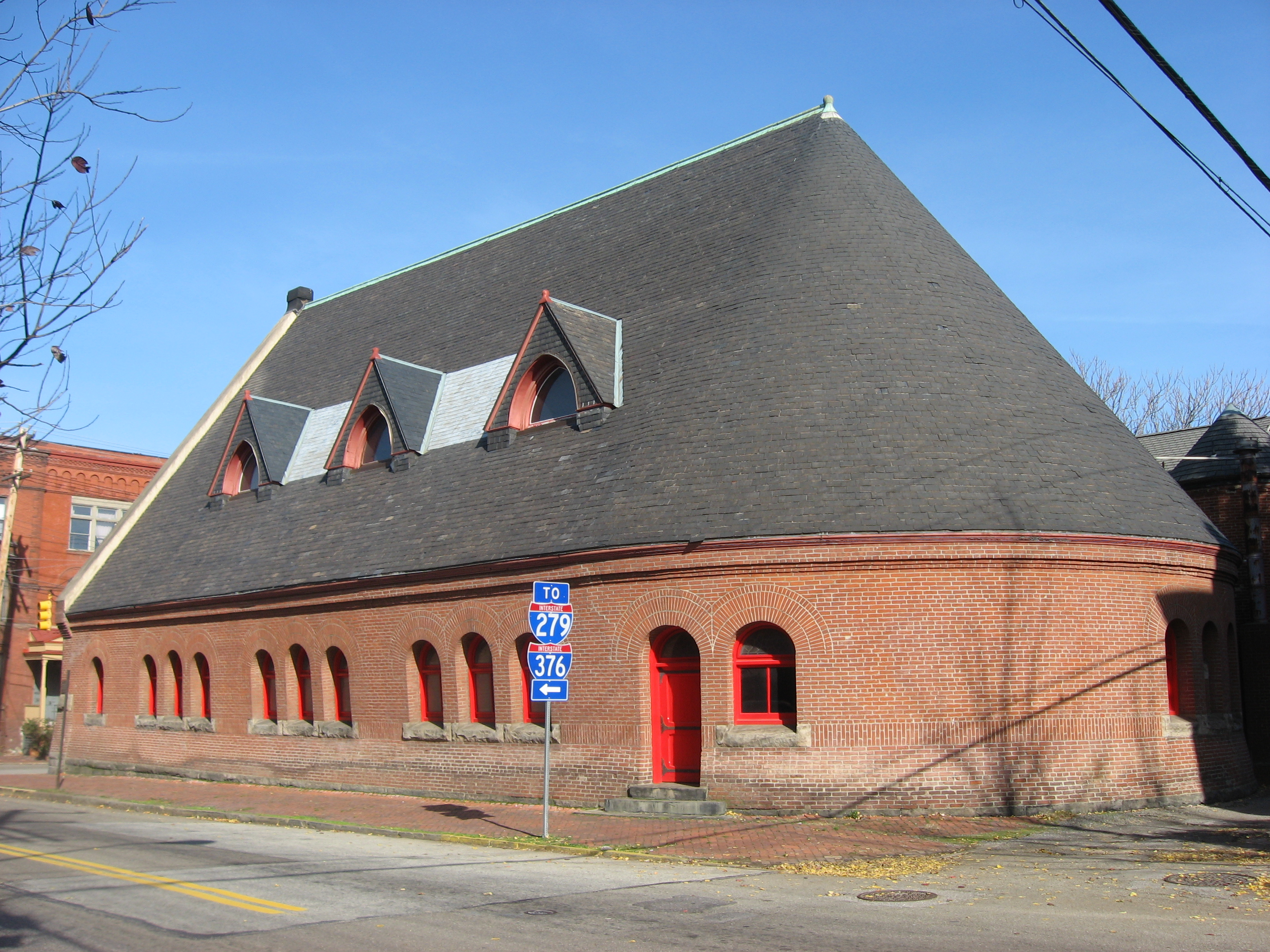
Emmanuel Episcopal Church, built in 1885, at 957 West North Avenue.

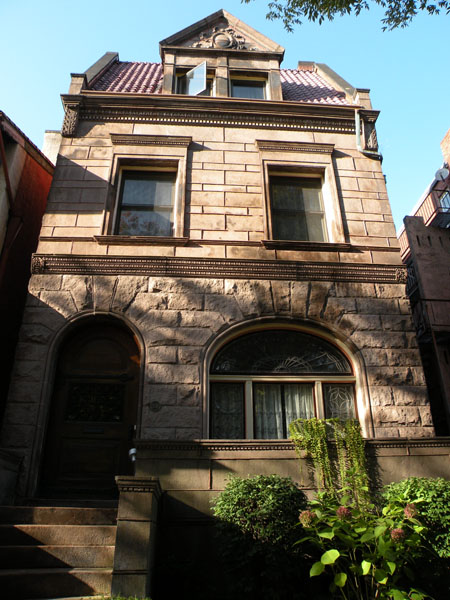
Joseph Horne House, built in 1889, at 838 North Lincoln Avenue.

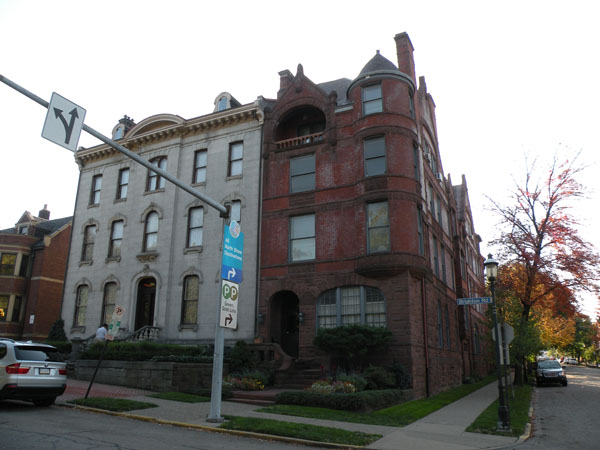
Harry Darlington House, built circa 1890, at 721 Brighton Road.

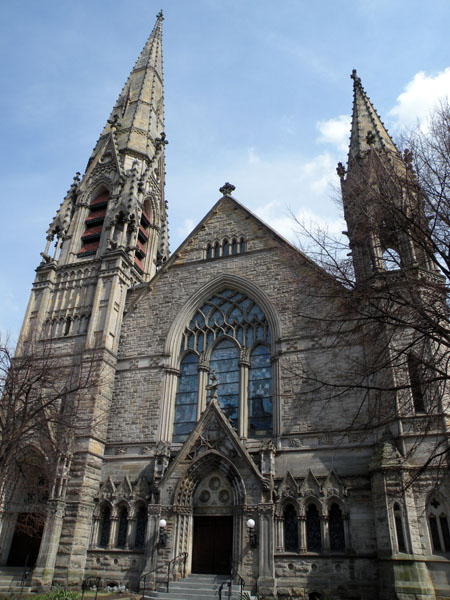
Calvary United Methodist Church, built from 1892 to 1895, at Allegheny Avenue and Beech Avenue (954 Beech Avenue).

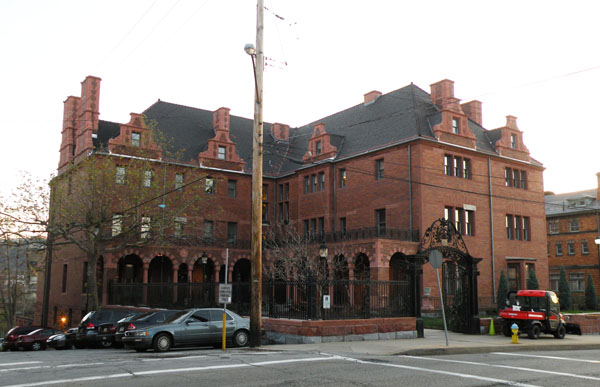
Byers-Lyons House, built in 1898, at 901 Ridge Avenue.

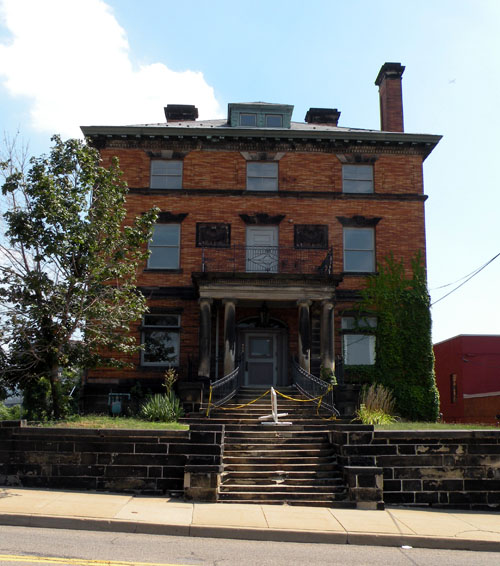
Chalfant Hall of CCAC (former house of Henry Chalfant), built circa 1900.

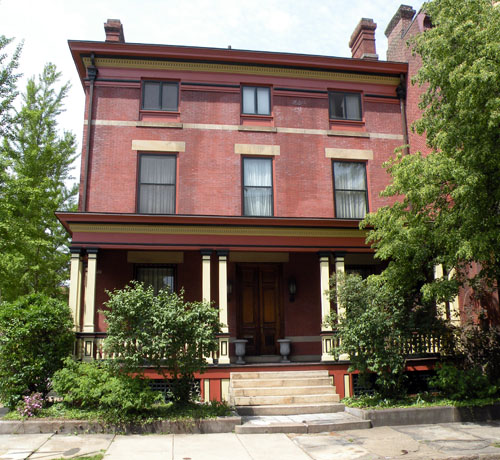
Mary Roberts Rinehart house (Rinehart lived at this house with her family from 1907 to 1912), at 954 Beech Avenue.

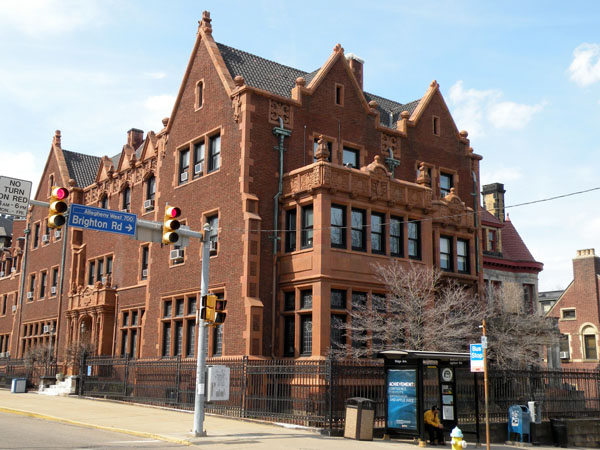
B. F. Jones House, built from 1908 to 1910, at 808 Ridge Avenue.

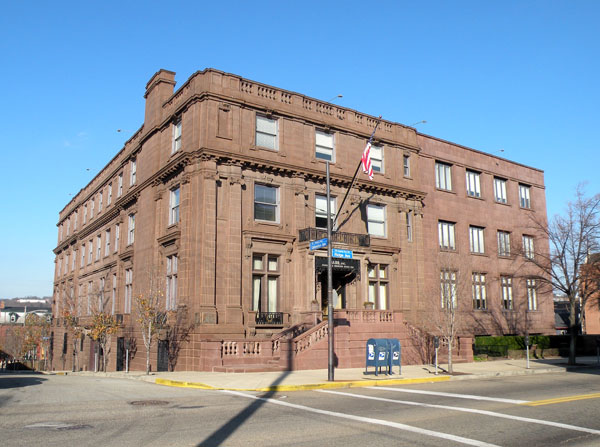
William Penn Snyder House, built in 1911, at 852 Ridge Avenue.

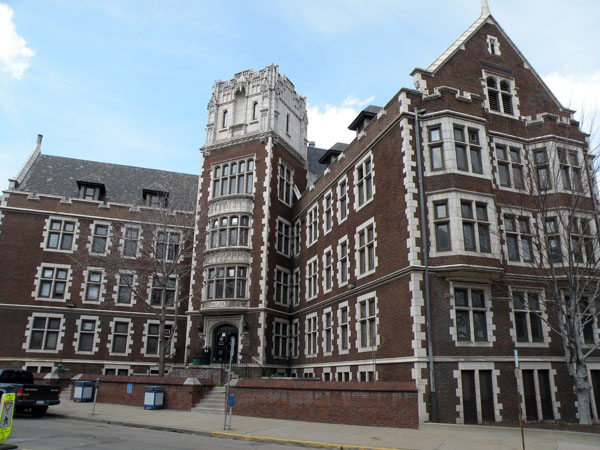
West Hall of CCAC (formerly Memorial Hall, Western Theological Seminary), built in 1911 and 1912.

Historical population
Census	Pop.	Note	%±
1940	3,210		—
1950	3,313		3.2%
1960	2,170		−34.5%
1970	1,124		−48.2%
1980	820		−27.0%
1990	654		−20.2%
2000	508		−22.3%
2010	462		−9.1%
2020	540		16.9%

== Surrounding Pittsburgh neighborhoods ==
- Allegheny Center
- Central Northside
- Chateau
- Manchester
- North Shore

== See also ==
- List of Pittsburgh neighborhoods
