= Manchester (Pittsburgh) =

- Neighborhood
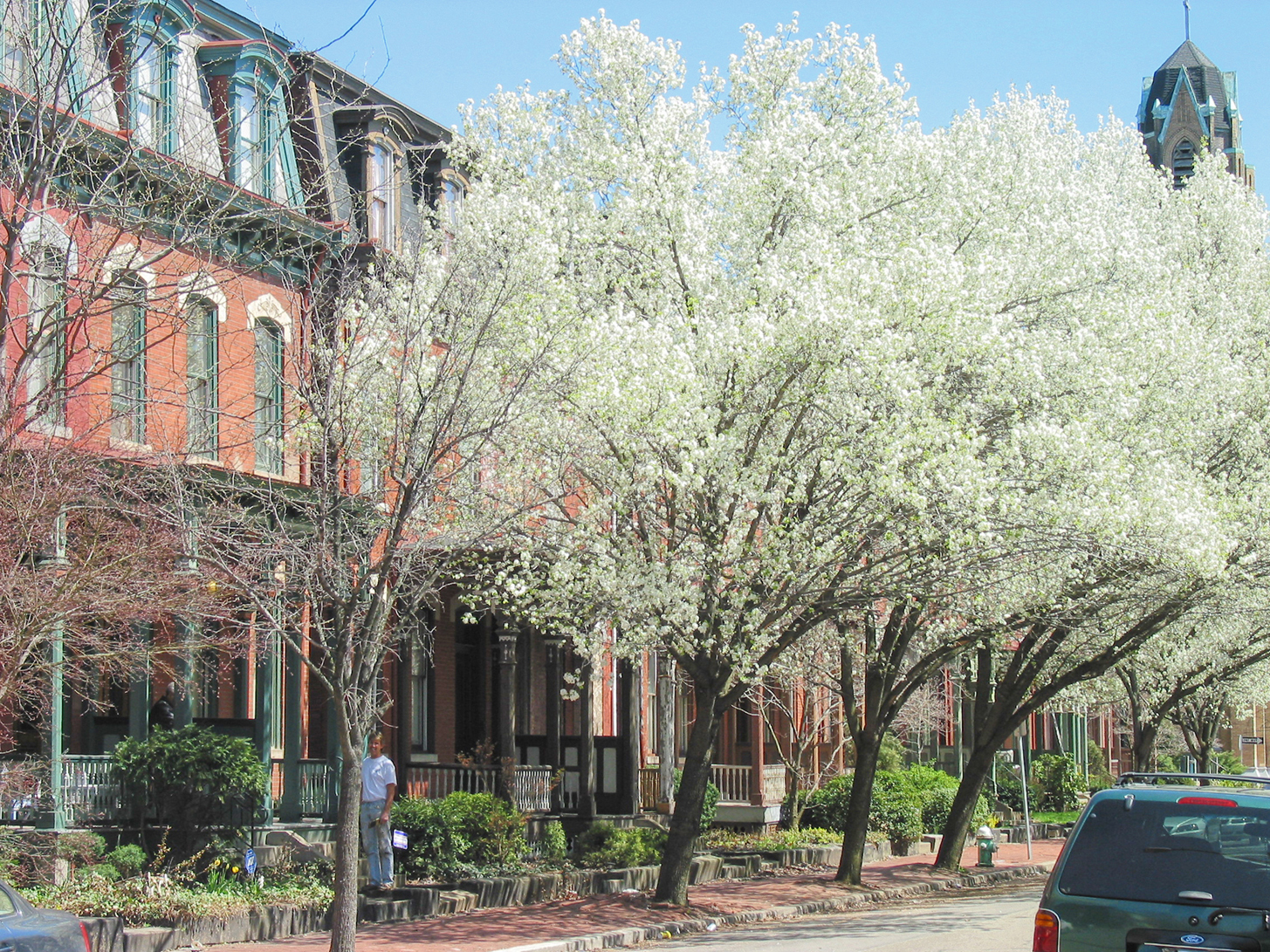
- Liverpool Street in Manchester

- Location of Manchester in Pittsburgh
- Coordinates: 40°27′18″N 80°1′30″W
- Country: United States
- State: Pennsylvania
- City: Pittsburgh

Area
  - Total: 0.279 sq mi (0.72 km^{2})

Population (2020)
  - Total: 2,031
  - Density: 7,280/sq mi (2,810/km^{2})
- Manchester Historic District
- U.S. National Register of Historic Places
- U.S. Historic district
- City of Pittsburgh Historic District
- Pittsburgh Landmark – PHLF
- Location within Pittsburgh Location within Pennsylvania Location within the United States
- Area: 51.6 acres (20.9 ha). Irregular pattern contained with Faulsey, Chateau, Franklin, and Bidwell Streets.
- Architectural style: Late Victorian
- NRHP reference No.: 75001611

Significant dates
- Added to NRHP: September 18, 1975
- Designated CPHD: July 30, 1979
- Designated PHLF: 1976

Manchester is a neighborhood located in the North Side region of Pittsburgh, Pennsylvania. The neighborhood is represented on Pittsburgh City Council by the District 6 (Northshore/Downtown Neighborhoods). Manchester houses PBF Battalion 1 & 37 Engine, and is covered by PBP Zone 1 and the Bureau of EMS Medic 4. The neighborhood includes the Manchester Historic District, which protects, to some degree, 609 buildings over a 51.6-acre (20.9 ha) area. The district was listed on the National Register of Historic Places in 1975. It uses ZIP code of 15233.

== History ==
The Manchester area was undeveloped until 1832, when a group of local land owners laid out the town along the banks of the Ohio River, in what is now Chateau. Most notable among these was Thomas Barlow, nephew of poet-diplomat Joel Barlow. In its early years, the settlement provided supplies and services to the surrounding farms. By 1836, Manchester had grown large enough to function as a suburb of Allegheny City. That same year, the Globe Plow Works opened, which operated until at least 1888. Its population in 1837 had risen to 500. The populace was largely employed at local factories, which included a wagon factory and the Hinds and Howard paper mill. Amenities at this time included a school, taverns, and stores. On November 2, 1843, by act of the Pennsylvania Assembly, the borough of Manchester was created out of the surrounding Ross Township. By 1868 there was a well-used wharf in the borough that needed repair. On 12 March 1867, the State Legislature enacted a statute to allow Allegheny City to annex the Borough of Manchester, adding a 9 April 1867 supplement to also annex the southern portions of McClure and Reserve townships. Until 1907, Manchester was a ward of Allegheny. Thereafter it is a neighborhood of Pittsburgh with boundaries that are still clearly known.

Manchester enjoyed easy access to the Ohio River and the Beaver Road, which followed approximately the same route as present-day Pennsylvania Route 65. The area was therefore well-connected to points west such as Sewickley and Beaver, which contributed to its continued development through the early 20th century.

Like many other predominantly African-American areas in the Rust Belt, the history of Manchester in the mid-20th century was defined by the effects of urban renewal. By the late 1950s, those displaced by the leveling of the Hill District moved to the area. The Urban Redevelopment Authority of Pittsburgh razed 164 acres in Manchester in 1961.

In the 1950s and 1960s, community protests stalled plans to extend the congested Route 65 through Manchester. Opposition to the highway culminated in the founding of the Manchester Citizens Corporation in 1965. Despite their advocacy, extensions to the highway ultimately proceeded. Construction cut through Manchester beginning in the 1970s and by January 1992 the construction of Route 65 as an elevated highway was complete. The community was devastated by the highway's construction. The once-thriving business district along Beaver Avenue was razed. As of 2025, the street now serves as a frontage road in a desolate industrial area of Chateau. Unlike many other elevated highways, a concrete wall was constructed under the road. It has since been dubbed "Great Wall of Manchester" due to the barrier's profound influence on the community. Manchester lost easy access to the riverfront in Chateau, especially pedestrian access. Only a single pedestrian underpass connects the two neighborhoods. On March 31, 2023, United States Representative Summer Lee and United States Senator Bob Casey, Jr. announced a $1.4 million dollar grant funded by the Infrastructure Investment and Jobs Act to study the impacts of the Great Wall on Chateau and Manchester.

As of 2025, efforts spearheaded by the Manchester Community Corporation to reconnect the two communities are ongoing.

== Geography ==
The Manchester Historic District is Pittsburgh's largest historic district under the National Register of Historic Places, preserved for its early 19th century-built Late Victorian-style houses.

It has a central location within Allegheny County. The Three Rivers Heritage Trail System runs along Manchester.

== Demographics ==
Manchester is almost exclusively residential. As of the 2020 census, there were 2,031 people residing in Manchester, a decline of 5% from 2010. According to a report created by the University Center for Social and Urban Research, 46.3% of houses were families while 55.7% were nonfamily households. The median sales price for homes in Manchester for Nov 12 to Jan 13 was $172,350. This represents an increase of 36.8%, or $46,350, compared to the prior quarter and an increase of 48.6% compared to the prior year. Sales prices have appreciated 94.7% over the last 5 years in Manchester, Pittsburgh. The median sales price of $172,350 for Manchester is 29.68% higher than the median sales price for Pittsburgh PA. Average price per square foot for homes in Manchester was $54 in the most recent quarter, which is 43.75% lower than the average price per square foot for homes in Pittsburgh.

== Education ==
Manchester's public schools are managed by Pittsburgh Public Schools.

== Surrounding Pittsburgh neighborhoods ==
- Allegheny West
- California-Kirkbride
- Central Northside
- Chateau
- Marshall-Shadeland

== Gallery ==
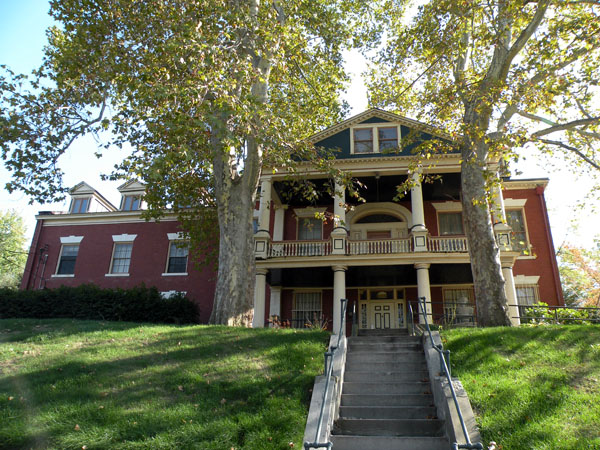
Anderson Manor, built circa 1830, at 1423 Liverpool Street.

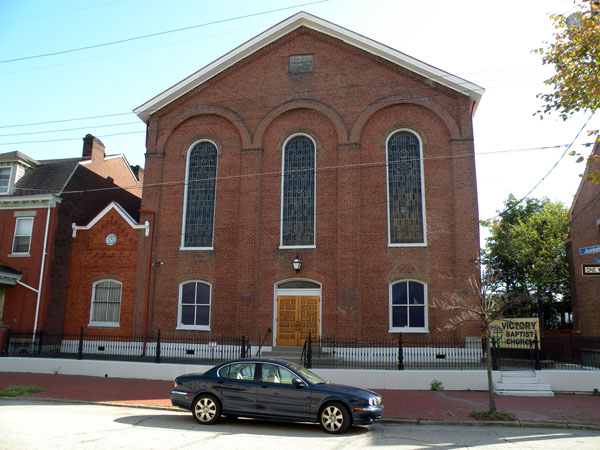
Victory Baptist Church (formerly the First German United Evangelical Protestant Church), built in 1865, located at 1437 Juniata Street.

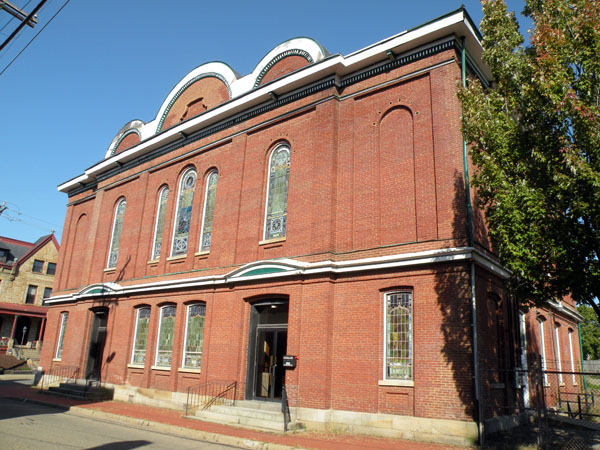
New Zion Baptist Church (formerly Union Methodist Church), built in 1867, located at 1304 Manhattan Street.

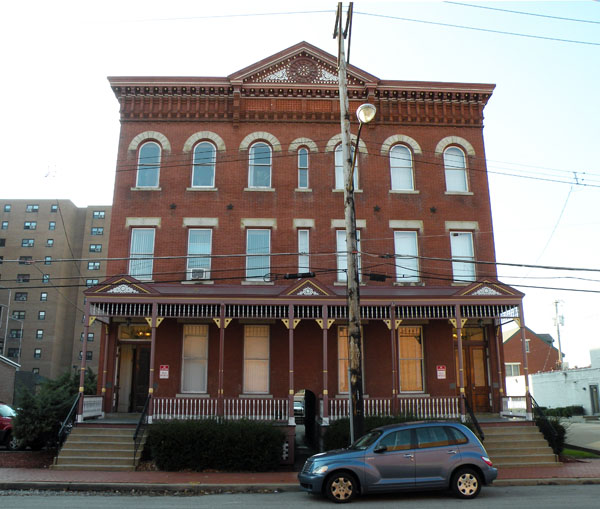
Hoene-Werle House, built in 1887, at 1313–1315 Allegheny Avenue.

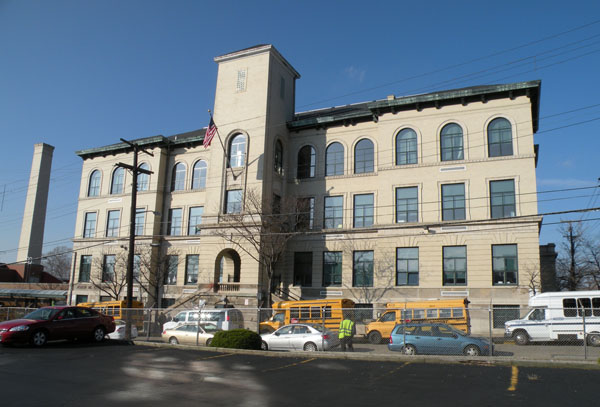
Conroy Junior High School (also known as Conroy Education Center), built in 1936, at the corner of Page and Fulton Streets.

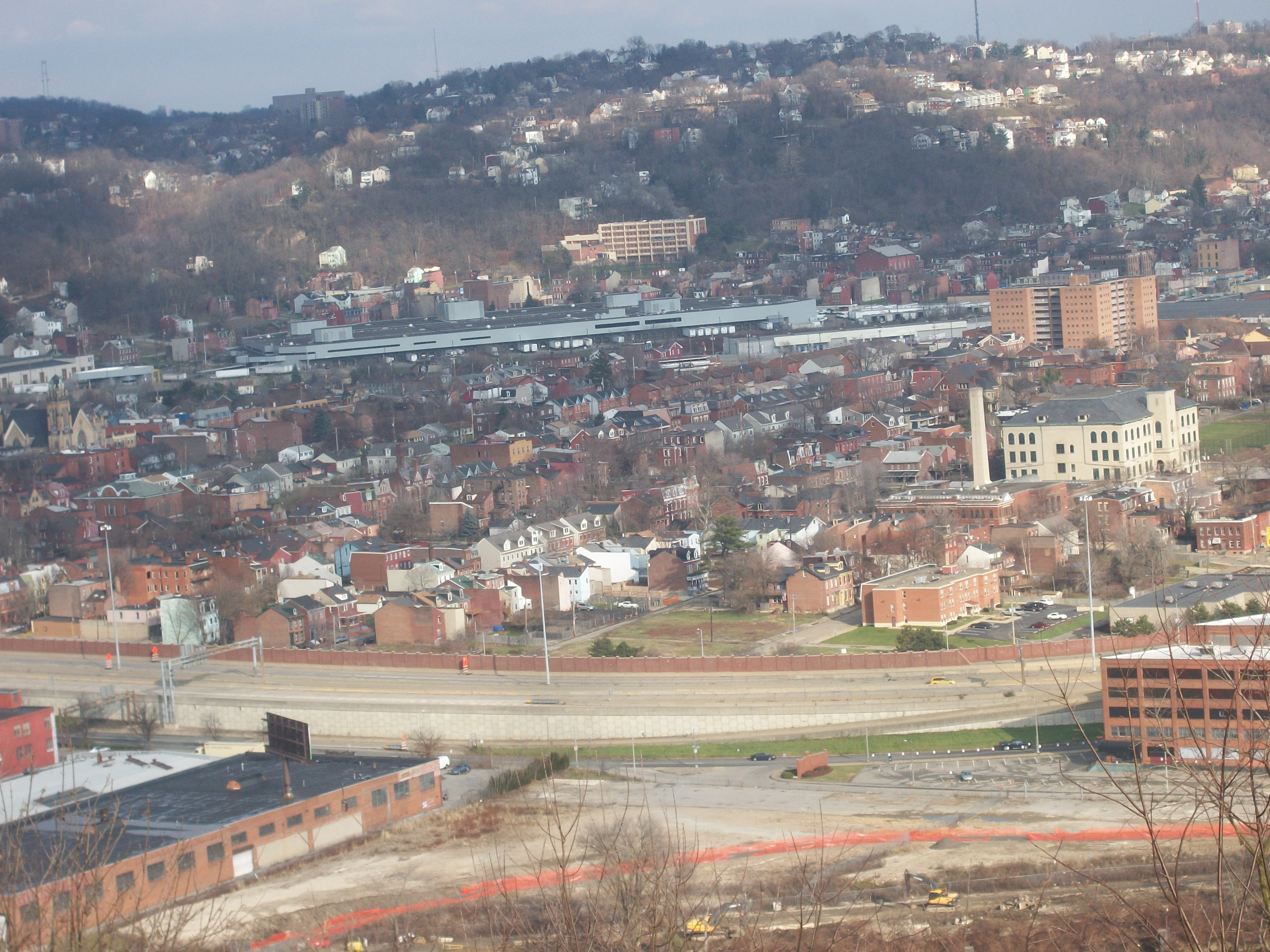
Manchester, as seen from the West End Overlook.

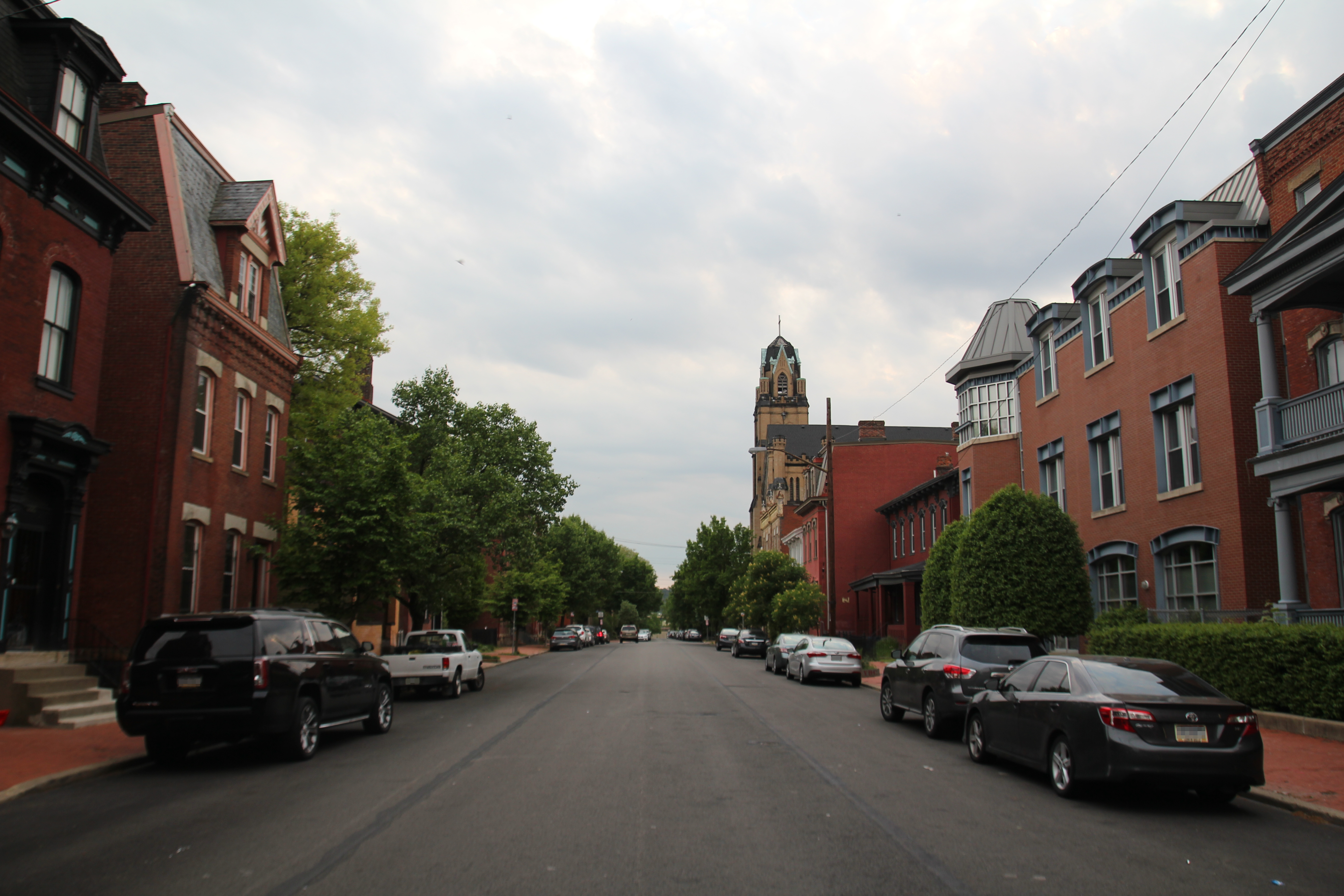
West facing view of Liverpool Street

== Notable residents ==
- Sue Kerr

== See also ==
- List of Pittsburgh neighborhoods
