= William Penn Snyder House =

Historic house in Pennsylvania, United States

- U.S. National Register of Historic Places
- City of Pittsburgh Historic Structure
- Pittsburgh Landmark – PHLF
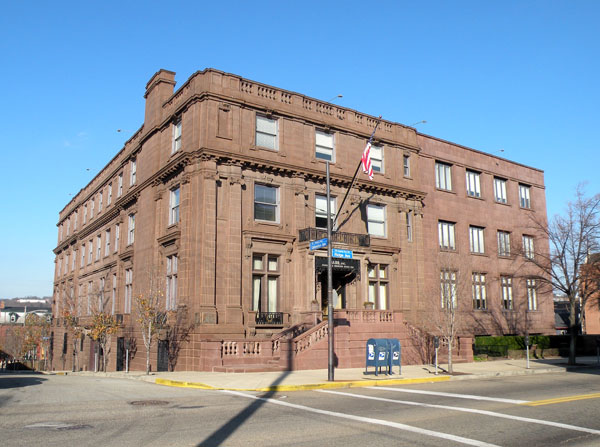

- Location within Pittsburgh Location within Pennsylvania Location within the United States
- Location: 852 Ridge Avenue, Pittsburgh, Pennsylvania, USA
- Coordinates: 40°27′1.08″N 80°0′57″W
- Built: 1911
- Architect: George Orth and Brother
- Architectural style: French Renaissance Revival, Renaissance Revival
- NRHP reference No.: 76001599

Significant dates
- Added to NRHP: May 3, 1976
- Designated CPHS: March 15, 1974
- Designated PHLF: 1972

The William Penn Snyder House is an historic building, which is located at 850–854 Ridge Avenue in the Allegheny West neighborhood of Pittsburgh, Pennsylvania.

A three-story, late French Renaissance-style brownstone, which was built on "Millionaire's Row" in 1911 at a cost of $450,000, it was described by The Pittsburgh Press in 1976 as "the city's sole example of the small 'town palace.'"

Presently more than a century old, the building was added to the List of Pittsburgh History and Landmarks Foundation Historic Landmarks in 1972, the List of City of Pittsburgh historic designations on March 15, 1974, and the National Register of Historic Places on May 3, 1976.

== History ==
Designed for iron industry millionaire William Penn Snyder by George Orth, with construction beginning in 1911, the William Penn Snyder House was completed in early January 1912, and received significant media coverage of its opening when the Penn family hosted a combined housewarming for their new residence and a debutantes' ball in honor of their daughter on January 19, 1912.

The William Penn Snyder House was added to the List of Pittsburgh History and Landmarks Foundation Historic Landmarks in 1972, the List of City of Pittsburgh historic designations on March 15, 1974, and the National Register of Historic Places on May 3, 1976.

Located in the historic, Pittsburgh neighborhood of Allegheny West, the home was proposed for inclusion in a new city historic district by the Pittsburg Historic Review Commission at its meeting in early September 1989.

=== Present day ===
Babb, Inc., an insurance brokerage firm currently owns and occupies the building.

== Gallery ==
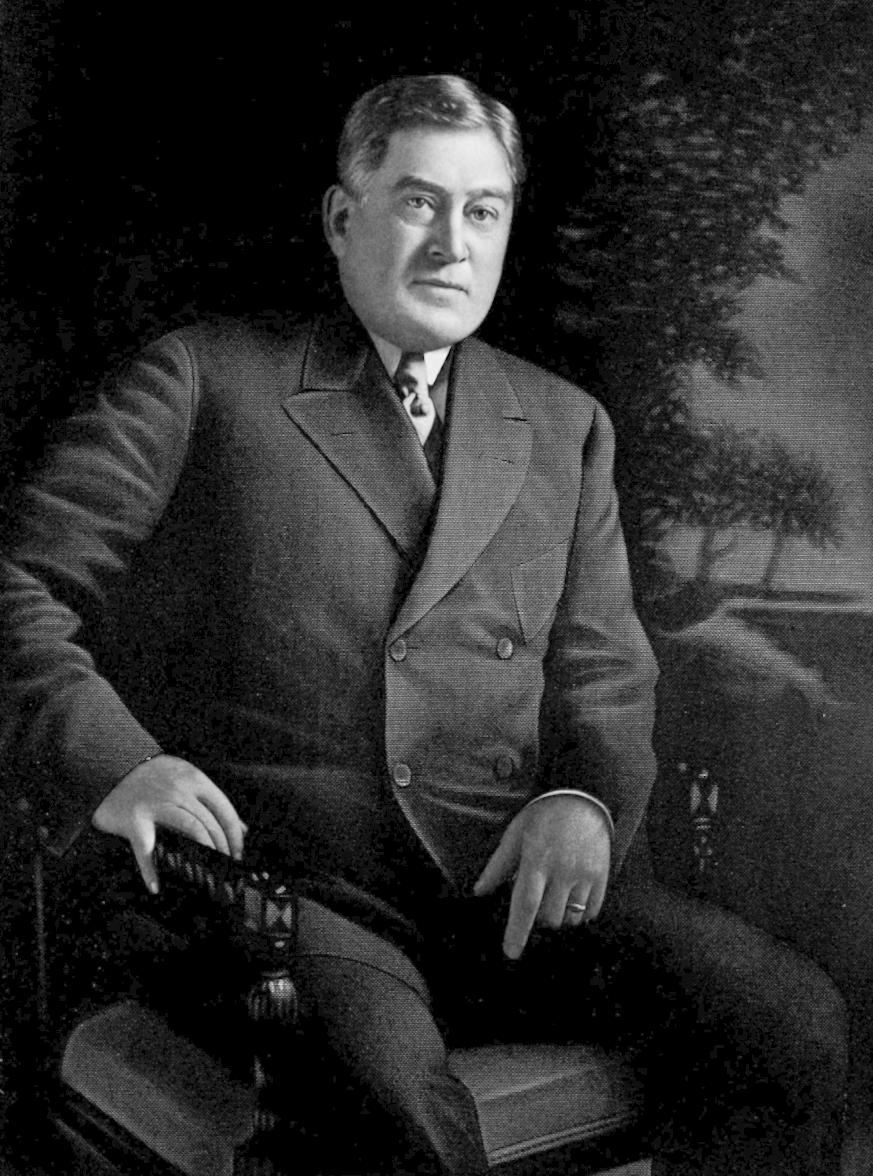
William Penn Snyder (1861–1921)
