= McClure Township, Allegheny County, Pennsylvania =

McClure Township
- Former Township
- Location within the state of Pennsylvania
- Coordinates: 40.476°N 80.032°W
- Country: United States
- State: Pennsylvania
- County: Allegheny
- Established: 8 January 1859
- Dissolved: 15 April 1873
- Named for: Judge William B. McClure
- Time zone: UTC-5 (Eastern (EST))
  - Summer (DST): UTC-4 (EDT)

McClure Township was a township in Allegheny County, Pennsylvania within what is now the North Side of Pittsburgh. It was formed in 1859 from parts of Ross, Reserve, and Robinson townships. Its original territory, bordering Allegheny City and Manchester Borough on the south and the Ohio River on the west, included the Woods Run area and present-day Brighton Heights. Allegheny annexed portions of McClure in 1867 and 1870, and the remainder in 1873.
