= Byers-Lyons House =

Historic house in Pennsylvania, United States

- U.S. National Register of Historic Places
- City of Pittsburgh Historic Structure
- Pittsburgh Landmark – PHLF
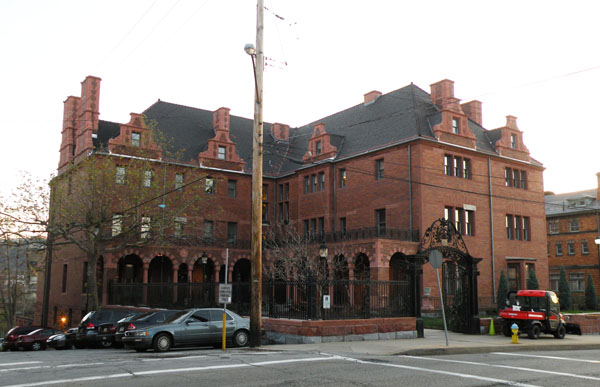

- Location within Pittsburgh Location within Pennsylvania Location within the United States
- Location: 901 Ridge Avenue (Allegheny West), Pittsburgh, Pennsylvania, USA
- Coordinates: 40°26′59″N 80°0′58″W
- Area: 0.5 acres (0.20 ha)
- Built: 1898
- Architect: Alden & Harlow
- Architectural style: Renaissance Revival, Châteauesque
- NRHP reference No.: 74001735

Significant dates
- Added to NRHP: November 19, 1974
- Designated CPHS: March 15, 1974
- Designated PHLF: 1989

The Byers-Lyons House (now Byers Hall of the Community College of Allegheny County's Allegheny Campus) in the Allegheny West neighborhood of Pittsburgh, Pennsylvania, is a building from 1898. It was added to the List of City of Pittsburgh historic designations on March 15, 1974, the National Register of Historic Places on November 19, 1974, and the List of Pittsburgh History and Landmarks Foundation Historic Landmarks in 1989.
