= 841 North Lincoln Avenue =

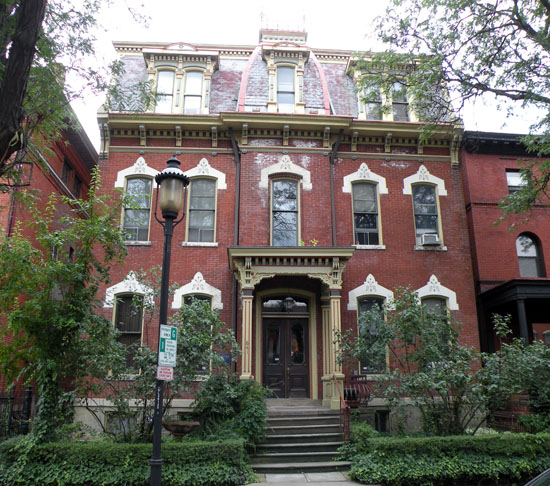

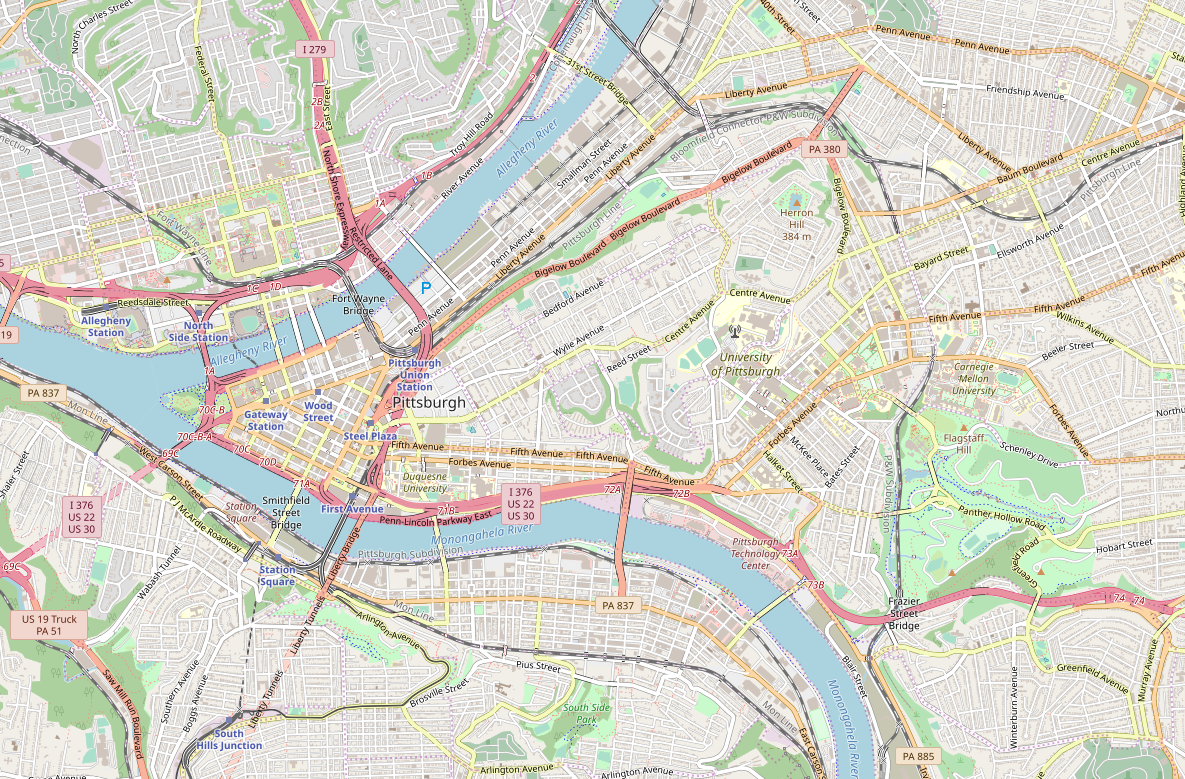
- Location of 841 North Lincoln Avenue in Downtown Pittsburgh
- 40°27′3.79″N 80°0′55.27″W
- Location: 841 North Lincoln Avenue (Allegheny West), Pittsburgh, Pennsylvania, USA

History
- Built: 1878

Pittsburgh Landmark – PHLF
- Designated: 1977

841 North Lincoln Avenue in the Allegheny West neighborhood of Pittsburgh, Pennsylvania, was built in 1878. It was added to the List of Pittsburgh History and Landmarks Foundation Historic Landmarks in 1977.
