= Stewart Sutin =

American academic administrator

Stewart Sutin is an American academic administrator. He currently serves on the advisory board of the STAR Scholars Network.

== Education ==
Sutin earned his doctorate in Latin American history from the University of Texas at Austin in 1975.

== Career ==
Sutin served as president of the Community College of Allegheny County in Pennsylvania. Under Sutin, the college was criticized for cutting class offerings while raising the salaries of administrators by double digit percentages. In 2004, Sutin received a $20,000 bonus while the college was in a self-described financial crisis. Sutin was criticized by Allegheny County chief executive Dan Onorato for taking expensive trips and buying a CCAC-paid membership in the Duquesne Club.

Sutin also served as an associate director of the Institute for International Studies in Education (IISE) at the University of Pittsburgh.
