= Anderson Manor, Pennsylvania =

Anderson Manor
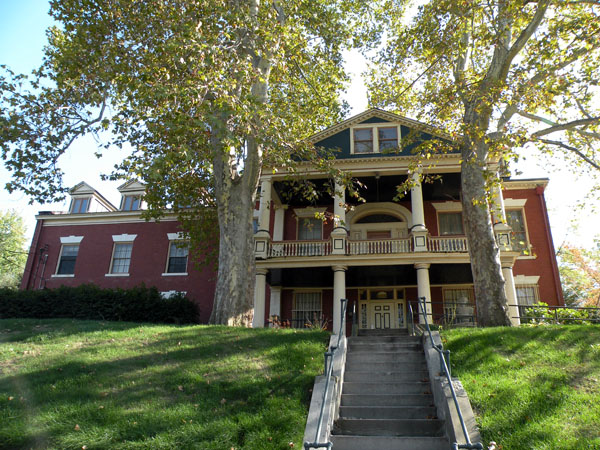

- Location of Anderson Manor in Pittsburgh
- 40°27′16.46″N 80°1′38.6″W
- Location: 1423 Liverpool Street (Manchester), Pittsburgh, Pennsylvania, USA

History
- Built: circa 1830 (with additions in 1905)

Pittsburgh Landmark – PHLF
- Designated: 1989

Anderson Manor (former James Anderson House, currently Anderson Manor ) located at 1423 Liverpool Street in the Manchester neighborhood of Pittsburgh, Pennsylvania, was built circa 1830 (additions were added to the house in 1905). Colonel James Anderson, who lived at this house, was the man from whom Andrew Carnegie (1835–1919) borrowed books during his formative years. Anderson opened his personal library of 400 volumes to working boys each Saturday night, and helped start the first library in the area. The house was added to the List of Pittsburgh History and Landmarks Foundation Historic Landmarks in 1989.
