= Community College of Allegheny County =

Multi-campus public college in Pennsylvania, U.S.

- Motto: Our goal is your success
- Type: Public community college
- Established: September 1966
- President: Quintin B. Bullock
- Administrative staff: 2,273
- Students: 66% part-time; 34% full-time
- Location: Allegheny County, Pennsylvania, United States
- Campus: Urban
- Colors: Red and white
- Website: ccac.edu

Community College of Allegheny County (CCAC) is a public community college in Allegheny County, Pennsylvania, United States. It has four campuses and four centers and offers associate degrees, certificates, and diplomas.

== History ==
The Pennsylvania legislature passed the Community College Act in 1963, and officials in Allegheny County began creating a local community college. County residents voted to fund the project in May 1965, and the first 15-member board of trustees was sworn in that December. The college opened Boyce Campus, in Monroeville, and Allegheny Campus, on Pittsburgh's North Side, in 1966. The following year, South Campus was opened; North Campus opened in 1972. The college also has centers beyond the main campuses that offer classes.

== Academics ==
CCAC's academic programs lead to an associate degree, a certificate, or a transfer to a four-year institution through more than 150 programs and lifelong learning, community education, continuing education, and workforce training courses. During the 2012–2013 academic year, it had more than 32,000 credit and 28,000 non-credit students. Through articulation agreements, students are guaranteed admission and the recognition of courses at several institutions offering four-year degrees.

== Student life and athletics ==
Volunteer students operate a college-wide newspaper, The Voice. The newspaper and its staff have received several recognitions and awards in recent years, including Keystone Student Press Awards from the Pennsylvania NewsMedia Association and the Associated Collegiate Press. In spring 2020, The Voice was recognized as one of the few community college student newspapers to continue to publish regularly during the COVID-19 pandemic.

CCAC athletics are affiliated with the National Junior College Athletic Association (NJCAA). The team name and mascot, Wild Cats, was chosen by a student vote in 2019. Intercollegiate sports include men's and women's basketball, women's volleyball, men's baseball, men's and women's golf, and bowling.

== Campuses ==
The Community College of Allegheny County has a campus or center within ten miles (16 km) of more than 95% of Allegheny County residents.

=== Allegheny Campus ===
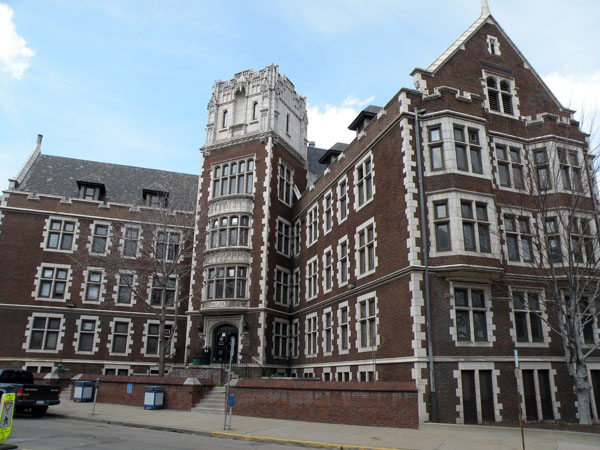
West Hall

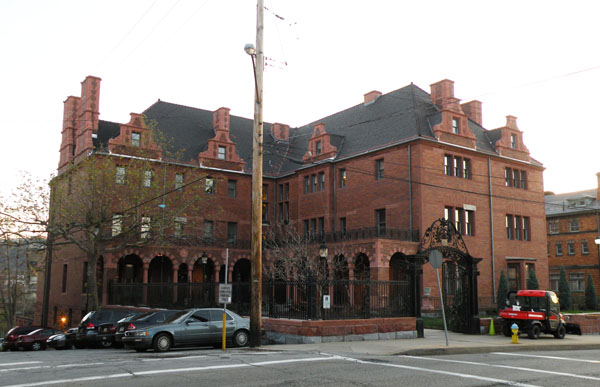
Byers Hall

In Pittsburgh's Allegheny West neighborhood and surrounded by Acrisure Stadium, PNC Park, the Carnegie Science Center, and other notable landmarks, CCAC's Allegheny Campus is the largest and only urban campus of the college.

Allegheny Campus features a blend of modern and historic architecture set on 10 acres (40,000 m^{2}) in a neighborhood once known as Pittsburgh's Millionaires' Row and extending to the once posh "Monument Hill" area (that rises above and behind modern-day Acrisure Stadium) so named for a Civil War monument dedicated on May 30, 1871, by General George G. Meade and Governor John W. Geary. The centerpiece of the campus is the Student Services Center, a 52,000-square-foot (4,800 m^{2}) hub housing the enrollment and financial aid offices, classrooms, a student lounge, dining facilities, and a 300-seat theatre/auditorium.

The campus also features a library, physical education facilities, and Milton Hall, the main campus classroom building. Along Ridge Avenue and Galveston Street are West Hall, Jones Hall, the general administration building; Byers Hall, housing the offices of the president and the Visual Arts Center. The K. Leroy Irvis Science Center was dedicated in March 2013.

=== Boyce Campus ===
The Boyce Campus, named after William D. Boyce, who founded the Boy Scouts of America, is on a 120 acres (0.49 km^{2}) plot in suburban Monroeville. A Pennsylvania State Historical Marker in the parking lot recognizes Boyce's contributions to Scouting.

The first of the four campuses to officially commence classes on September 19, 1966, Boyce moved to its current location in time for the start of fall classes in 1969. With all its programs under one roof, the multi-purpose building houses a gymnasium, cafeteria, theater, library, medical instruction facilities, and a child development center. Boyce also provides parking, an exercise room, an outdoor fitness trail, and baseball and soccer fields.

=== North Campus ===
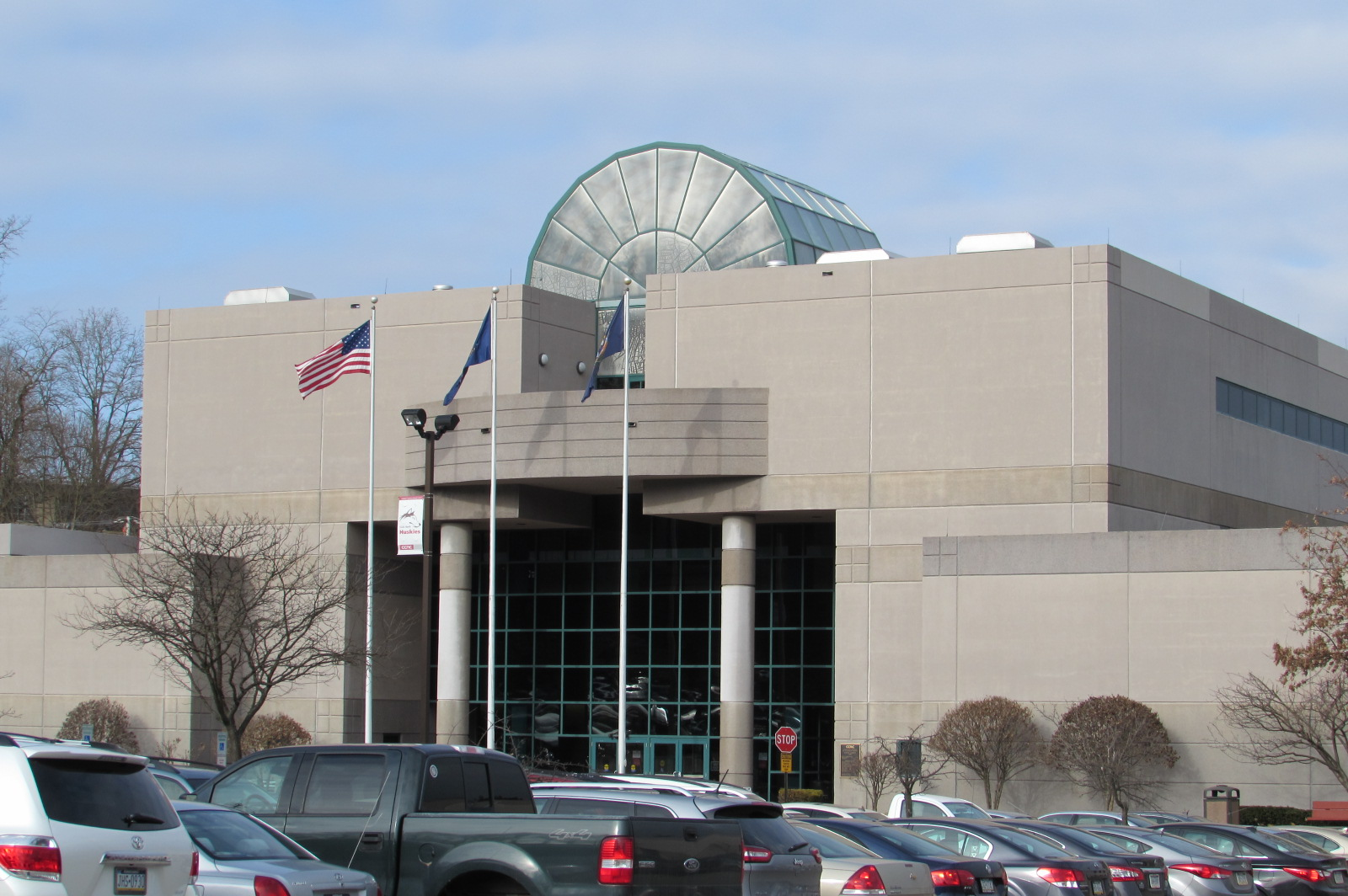
CCAC North Campus

CCAC's North Campus, located in suburban McCandless Township, Pennsylvania, was established in 1972 and is housed in a 150,000 square feet (14,000 m^{2}), single-building campus. Located approximately 12 miles (19 km) north of downtown Pittsburgh, the campus annually draws more than 38,000 students from Pittsburgh's northern and western suburbs. North Campus offers academic, workforce development, and continuing education programs and classes.

North Campus offers more than 55 different certificate and associate degrees, including Accounting and Business Management, Child Development, Computer & Information Science, Criminal Justice & Criminology, Land Administration, Tourism Management, Social Work, Nursing, and American Sign Language & Interpreting programs of study.

=== South Campus ===
In suburban West Mifflin, CCAC's South Campus serves Allegheny County's southern communities and the Mon Valley region.

The campus moved to its current six-story facility in 1973. Indoor walkways and house lecture halls, classrooms, a learning assistance center, a community library, a theater, a radio station, dining areas, and office space connect its five buildings. South Campus' recently expanded Learning Resource Center includes computer and media centers and allied health and nursing laboratories. The campus also features a new Community Education Center building containing continuing education offices, a gymnasium, a fitness center, and the United States Steel Business and Industry center.

== Centers ==
CCAC has four centers in Allegheny and Washington counties.

=== Braddock Hills Center ===
The Braddock Hills Center, which replaces the former CCAC Braddock and Turtle Creek centers, is located in the Braddock Hills Shopping Center.

The instruction facility contains six classrooms, three computer labs, videoconferencing facilities, and a health careers program laboratory. The center offers degree and certificate programs, community education, and customized workforce job training for corporations and businesses.

=== Homewood-Brushton Center ===
Situated on North Homewood Avenue, the Homewood-Brushton Center is positioned to serve the city's east-end neighborhoods and outlying suburbs. Since 1967, the center's current building has been a community presence since 1981, when the popularity of the center's programs necessitated the construction of a new 32,000-square-foot (3,000 m^{2}) facility. The center houses classrooms, including a Learning Resource center, reading, computer, anatomy, chemistry, and biology laboratories, and videoconferencing facilities.

The center offers a range of credit, non-credit, and special programming year-round and hosts four active clubs, an after-school homework clinic, and a math, science, and computer institute conducted during the summer for kindergarten and grade-school-age children. It has established a relationship with the Carnegie Library of Homewood to be the center's library. Numerous community groups use the center as a meeting and gathering place.

=== Washington County Center ===
Founded in 2001, the Washington County center was the college's first and only center operating outside of Allegheny County. It was located in the Washington Crown Center mall.

The center allowed Washington County residents to take various credit, non-credit, community education, workforce training, dual enrollment (earmarked for high school juniors and seniors), and Act 48 training classes at the center and locations throughout Washington County.

This center closed on August 31, 2022.

=== West Hills Center ===
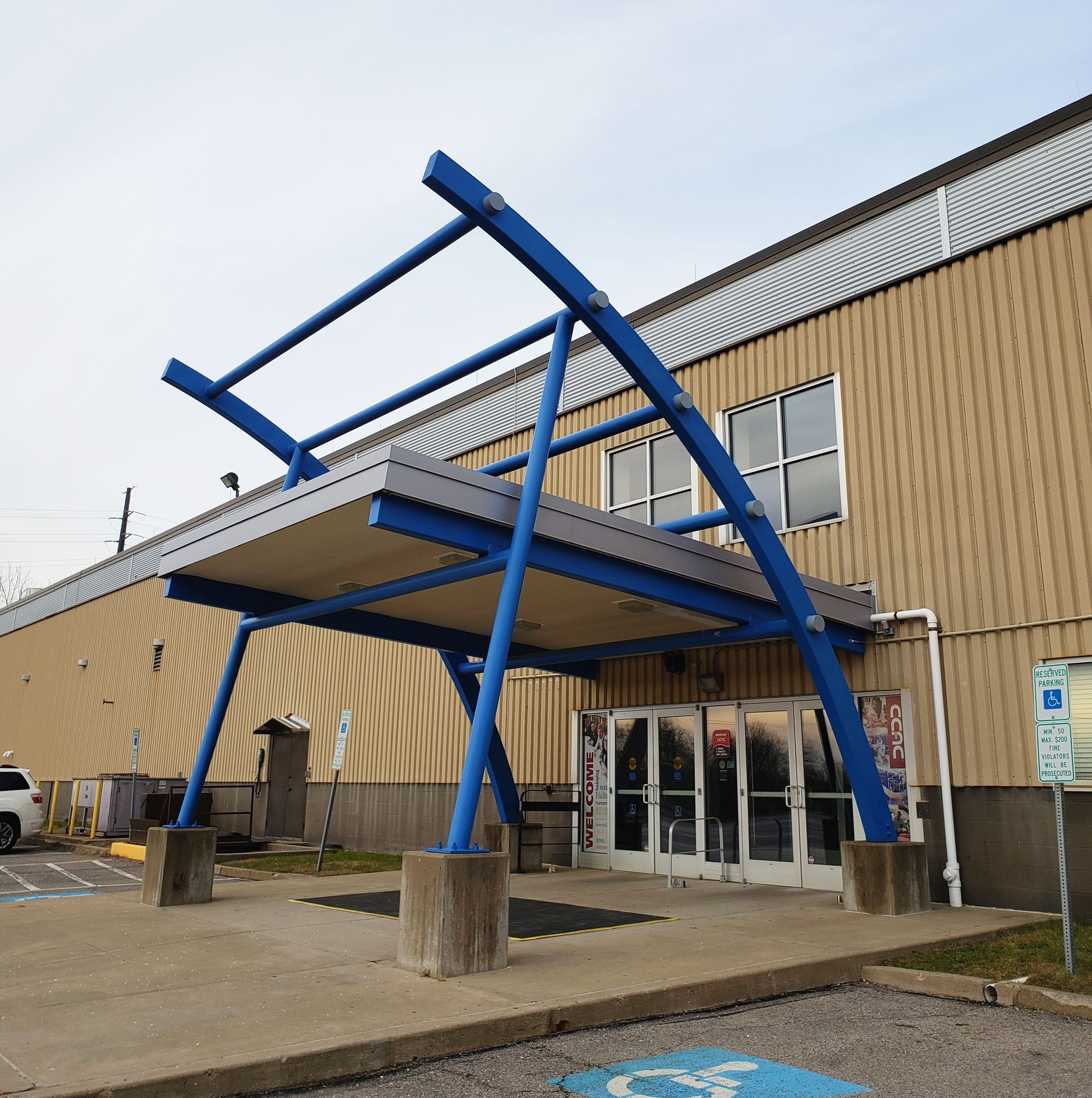
West Hills Center

Opened in spring 2007, CCAC's West Hills center replaces the former Airport West and Technology centers. Located in a 150,000-square-foot (14,000 m^{2}) facility in North Fayette Township, the center features classrooms and student life services. It also houses high-bay areas for automotive, HVAC, welding, and other trade-related programs. The West Hills Center also once had a bookstore for students, faculty and staff. The bookstore has since been replaced by a convenience store style self-service market.

On April 16, 2014, President Barack Obama and Vice President Joe Biden visited the West Campus.

== Notable alumni ==
- Paul Costa (1988), accountant and politician
- Thomas Crooks (2024), attempted assassin of Donald Trump
- David Dausey, epidemiologist; professor, provost, and president of Duquesne University
- Anthony M. DeLuca, politician and businessman
- Michael Fincke, NASA astronaut and retired colonel, U.S. Air Force
- Kathy Keller, Christian writer and church founder
- Miroslav Škoro, Croatian singer and politician

== Presidents ==
- Stewart Sutin
- Dr. Quintin Bullock
