= Conroy Education Center =

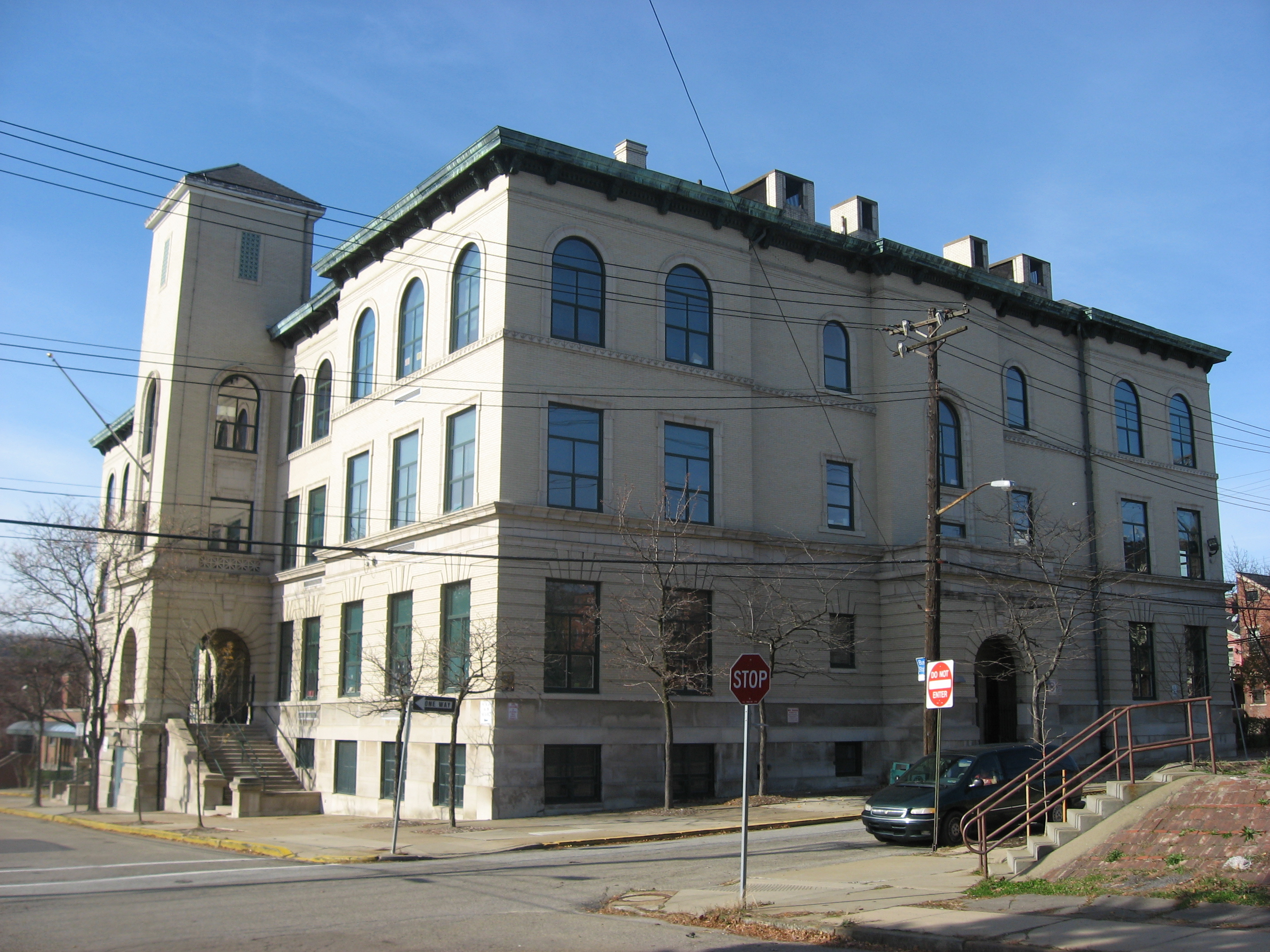

Location
- 1398 Page Street; Pittsburgh, PA 15233; United States; 40°27′39″N 80°1′28″W

Information
- Type: Public, Special education
- School district: Pittsburgh Public Schools
- Principal: Ms. Molly Skedel
- Grades: Ungraded
- Representative: Mark Brentley, Sr.
- Website: Conroy Education Center
- Conroy Junior High School
- U.S. National Register of Historic Places
- Pittsburgh Landmark – PHLF
- Area: 4 acres (1.6 ha)
- Built: 1895
- Architect: Marion M. Steen
- Architectural style: Art Deco, Renaissance
- MPS: Pittsburgh Public Schools TR
- NRHP reference No.: 86002662
- Added to NRHP: September 30, 1986

Conroy Education Center provides education for children with special needs in the Pittsburgh Public Schools. The school was added to the National Register of Historic Places on September 30, 1986, as Conroy Junior High School, and the List of Pittsburgh History and Landmarks Foundation Historic Landmarks in 2001.
