= Emmanuel Episcopal Church (Pittsburgh) =

Historic church in Pennsylvania, US

- U.S. National Register of Historic Places
- U.S. National Historic Landmark
- City of Pittsburgh Historic Structure
- Pittsburgh Landmark – PHLF
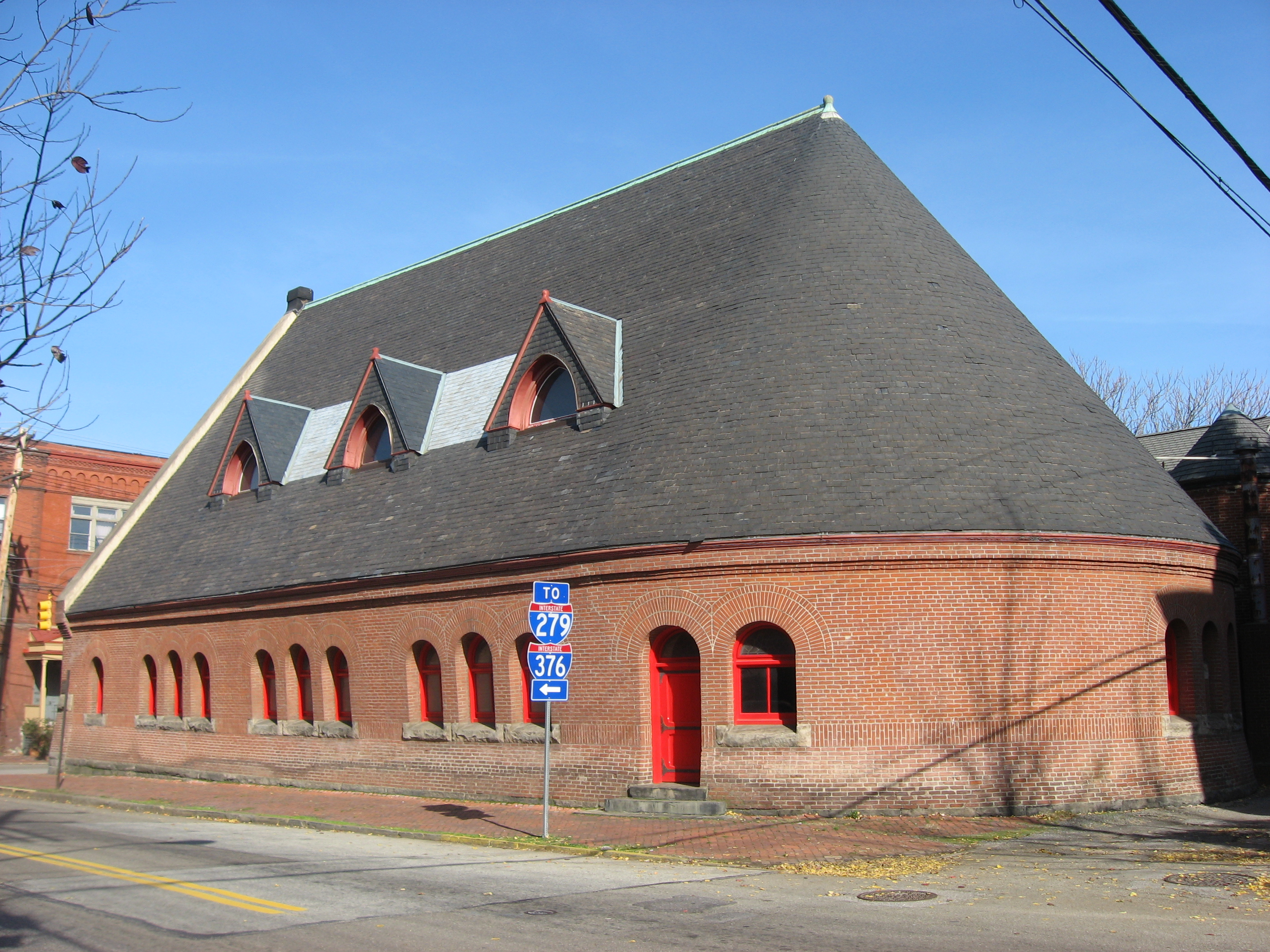
- Emmanuel Episcopal Church

- Location within Pittsburgh Location within Pennsylvania Location within the United States
- Location: 957 W. North Ave., Pittsburgh, Pennsylvania
- Coordinates: 40°27′11″N 80°1′10″W
- Area: 0.5 acres (0.20 ha)
- Built: 1886
- Architect: Henry Hobson Richardson
- Architectural style: Romanesque Revival, Richardsonian Romanesque
- NRHP reference No.: 74001737

Significant dates
- Added to NRHP: May 3, 1974
- Designated NHL: February 16, 2000
- Designated CPHS: February 22, 1977
- Designated PHLF: 1968

Emmanuel Episcopal Church is a church in the North Side neighborhood of Pittsburgh, Pennsylvania. Located at 957 West North Avenue at the corner of Allegheny Avenue, its 1886 building is known for its architectural features and was one of the last designs by Henry Hobson Richardson. It was declared a National Historic Landmark in 2000. An active parish of the Episcopal Diocese of Pittsburgh, it is known for offering a Sunday evening service of Jazz Vespers.

Though brick was selected for reasons of economy, the brickwork is one of the church's most striking features. Unlike most of Richardson's buildings, Emmanuel Episcopal's wall surfaces have fairly plain surfaces. They do not have a rough surface, moldings, belt courses or other projections to break up the planes or produce shadow lines, though the bricks do project from the main wall surface just below the eave line in two steps of different dimension to give a pleasing string course effect. Stone is used only as sills for the windows, and springing from the three entrance arches and where the foundation is exposed.

This simplicity is relieved, in part, by patterning the brickwork. Of particular note, the repetitive triangular pattern at the roofline is called “mousetooth.” The brick patterning gives the impression of finely woven fabric. The sharply incised windows and doors produce dramatic voids.

One of the best-known features of Emmanuel Episcopal Church is a mistake. The lower section of the western wall is intended to slope inward as it rises—an architectural feature called battering. Instead, the wall bows outward, a shape it began to take shortly after construction. Richardson having died a month after the building's dedication, the church hired his former employees, Longfellow, Alden & Harlow, to fix the problem. They were unable to pinpoint the cause. However, when the firm added the parish house to the far side of the church, the wall's slope stopped increasing.

== History ==
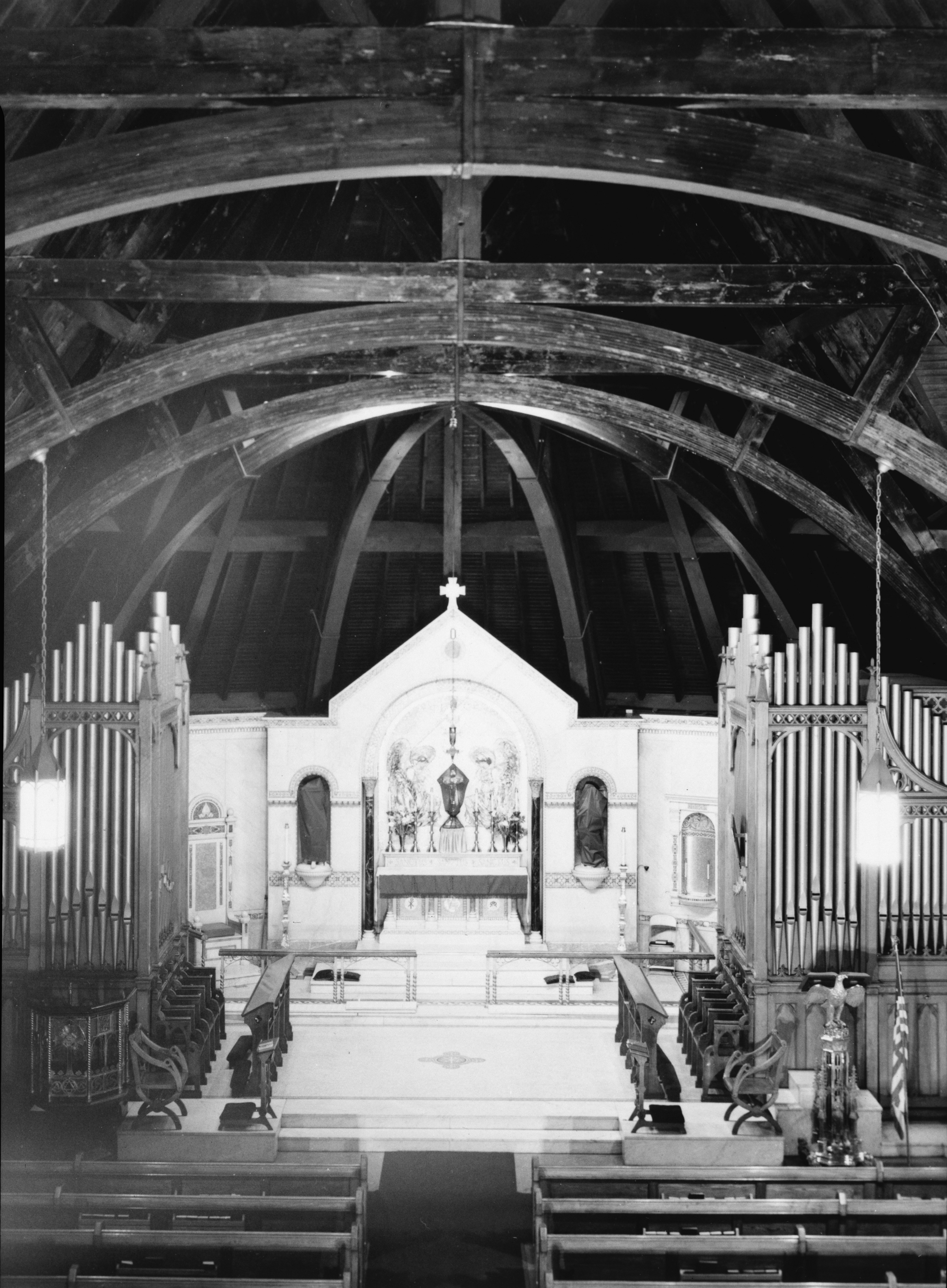
Interior

In 1867, Emmanuel Episcopal Church began as a mission fulfilling the need for a Sunday school for the children of English workmen. At first it met in homes and then in rented rooms. Membership grew to 76 people in 1868 when they received a church charter. The next year they built a frame church.

By 1875, the area became fashionable and the frame church became too small. The building committee was formed in 1882 with Postmaster Malcolm Hay as chairman. The land for the new church was purchased for $750 in 1883. H. H. Richardson was selected as the architect at the same time he was designing Pittsburgh's Allegheny County Courthouse and Jail in January 1884. Richardson's original plans were for a stone building of about the same size as the present church, but with central-tower theme, similar to the Trinity Church in Boston. The cost estimate of $25,000 was too high, and the congregation rejected the plans. The new budget was $12,000 and plans for the smaller brick church were approved.

The church was erected in 1884–1886 by Henry Shenk, and dedicated in March 1886.

Over the next 20 years, the neighborhood became much less fashionable, larger mansions were torn down, and new houses were built for the working class. Due to the financial straits of the congregation, the church was not renovated for many years.

== Architecture ==
The church is one of the finest later works of H.H. Richardson. The simple design gives vitality via the delicate brick detailing and the laminated truss system. The building is a one-story, simple rectangle with semicircular apse at one end with overall dimensions of 49' 4" x 100' 0". The walls are of red brick with several subtle patterns, the richest being on the gable end. The semicircular apse continues around the exterior wall at the other end of the building. The battered bases continue the line of the roof slope. Bands of vertical brick, or soldier's course, run across at the top and bottom of the windows, and the brick at the edge of the gables are at right angles to the slope.

The roof has a steep gable covered by slate with a molded copper ridge plate. The steep roof descends to low sidewalls. The cornice has a three-course corbel at the eaves. Three low dormers protrude about one-third up the gable roof on the east and west elevations.

The entrance facade is on the north side with an unadorned high gable and subtly patterned brickwork. There are three low wide arches with the center being the largest. The front façade contains three arched windows made of Tiffany glass above the entrance doors, taller in proportion than the entrance arches. There is a slot window in the center of the third level with a flat brick arch. Stone steps lead to the large arched wood double doors painted red with large elaborate black iron hinges.

The interior is rectangular in plan with a center aisle. The semicircular apse at the south end of the building is partially cut off from the nave by banks of organ pipes at either side. A narrow rectangular open narthex at the north end with a small enclosed winder stair on the west wall leads to the balcony. The narthex is 10' x 44'8"; the nave is 60'6" x 44'8"; and the apse has a 22'4" radius.

The walls have marble reredos, made by Leake and Greene of Pittsburgh, with bands of mosaic in the chancel. In the nave, the walls are random-width beaded-board wainscoting with chair rail. Above the chair rail, pink plaster rises up to the heavily molded wood cornice. The wood-truss system is exposed to the ceiling.

The side windows contain Romanesque stained glass, and Tiffany glass is in the triple window in the entrance gable. The floors are modern vinyl tile in the nave and marble in the chancel. In the 1998 restoration, the oak and ash furniture was removed, cleaned, and returned. A 3-foot-high (0.91 m) brass cross, given by Bishop Cortlandt Whitehead in August 1886 is still on the altar, and the brass eagle lectern made by Gorham in New York is still in place. The baptismal font and cover are original.
