= Equestrian statue of Winfield Scott Hancock =

Statue in Washington, D.C., US

General Winfield Scott Hancock
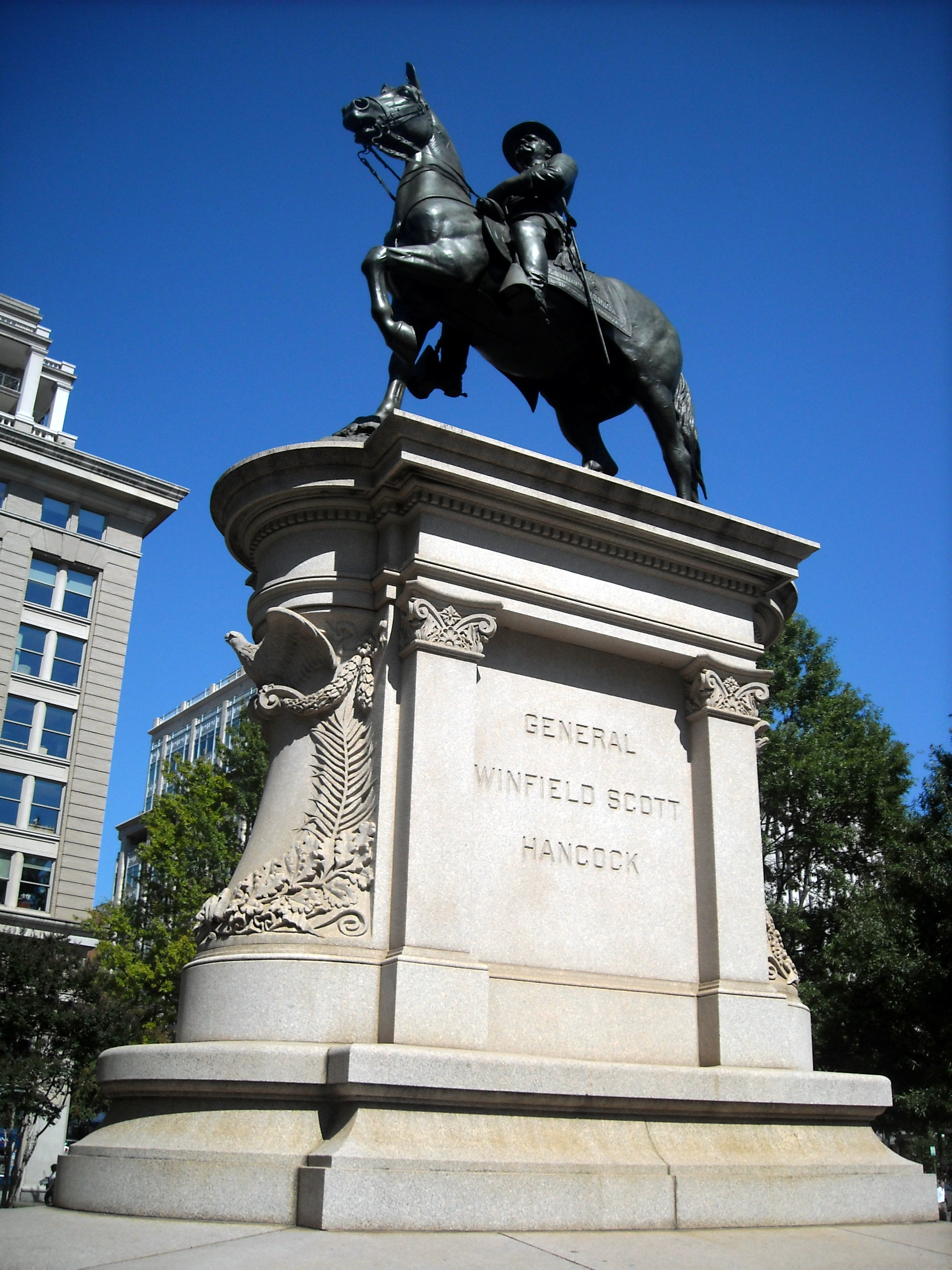
- Statue in 2009
- Artist: Henry Jackson Ellicott
- Year: 1896
- Type: Bronze
- Dimensions: 270 cm × 210 cm (9 ft × 7 ft)
- Location: Washington, D.C.
- Owner: National Park Service
- Equestrian statue of Winfield Scott Hancock
- U.S. National Register of Historic Places
- U.S. Historic district – Contributing property
- Location within Washington, D.C.
- Location: Washington, D.C.
- Coordinates: 38°53′37.46″N 77°1′20.12″W
- Part of: Civil War Monuments in Washington, DC.
- NRHP reference No.: 78000257
- Added to NRHP: September 20, 1978

General Winfield Scott Hancock is an equestrian statue of Winfield Scott Hancock, by Henry Jackson Ellicott together with architect Paul J. Pelz. It is located at Pennsylvania Avenue in United States Navy Memorial Park at the northwest corner of 7th Street, Northwest, Washington, D.C.

It was commissioned on March 2, 1889, and dedicated on May 12, 1896, by President Grover Cleveland. It cost $50,000.

The statue is a contributing monument to the Civil War Monuments in Washington, DC, of the National Register of Historic Places.

The statue is featured in the opening of the Netflix series House of Cards.

== See also ==
- List of public art in Washington, D.C., Ward 6
