= General George B. McClellan (Ellicott) =

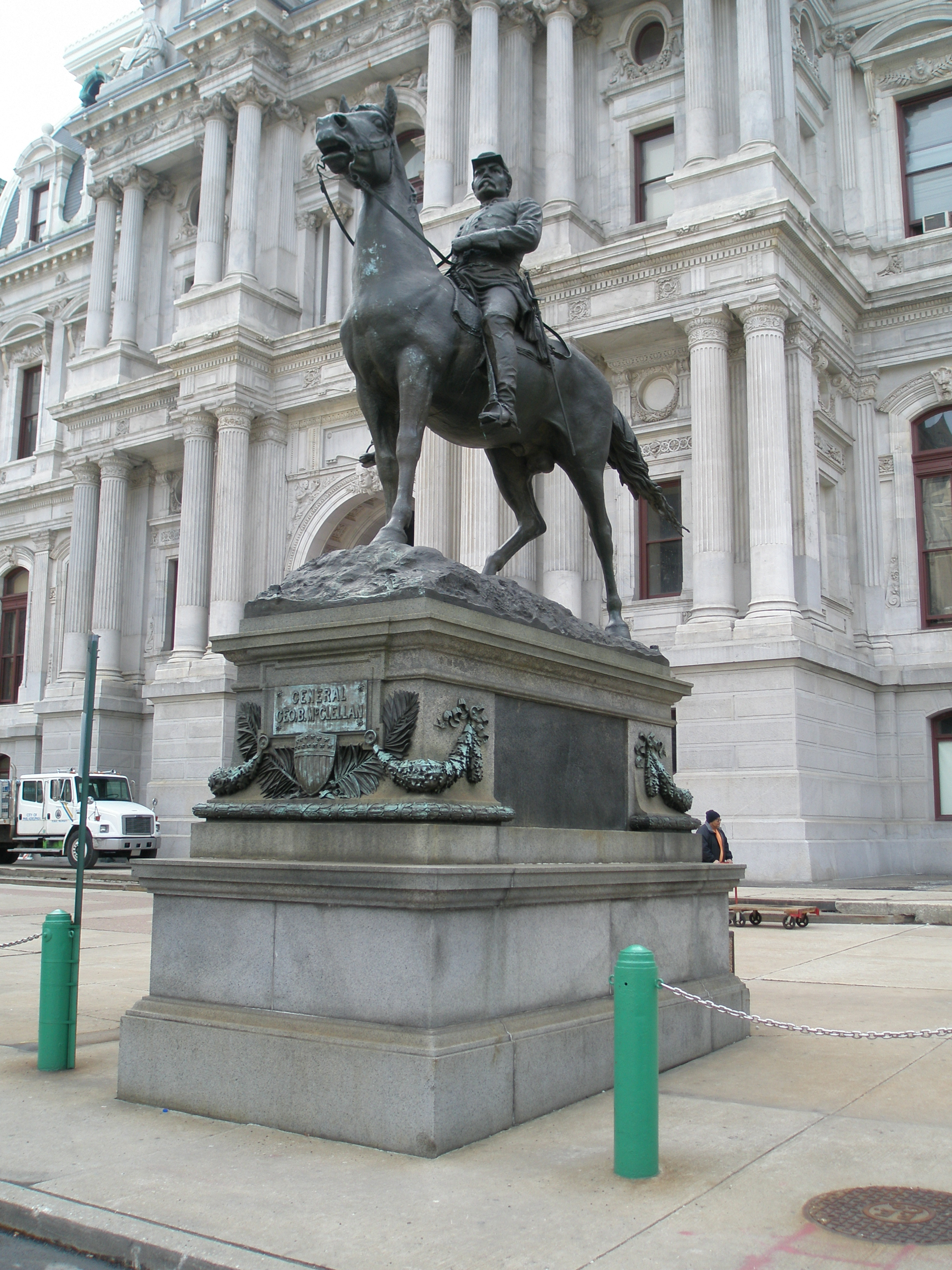
- Artist: Henry Jackson Ellicott
- Year: 1894
- Type: Bronze
- Dimensions: 4.42 m × 1.5 m × 4.6 m (14 ft 6 in × 5 ft × 15 ft)
- Location: Philadelphia, United States; 39°57′11″N 75°9′49″W
- Owner: City of Philadelphia

General George B. McClellan is an equestrian bronze sculpture, by Henry Jackson Ellicott.

== History ==
It is located at Philadelphia City Hall North plaza, at Broad Street & John F. Kennedy Boulevard, Philadelphia. It was dedicated in October 1894, and relocated in 1936.

== See also ==
- List of public art in Philadelphia
