= Union Dale Cemetery, Pittsburgh =

Cemetery in Pittsburgh, Pennsylvania

Union Dale Cemetery
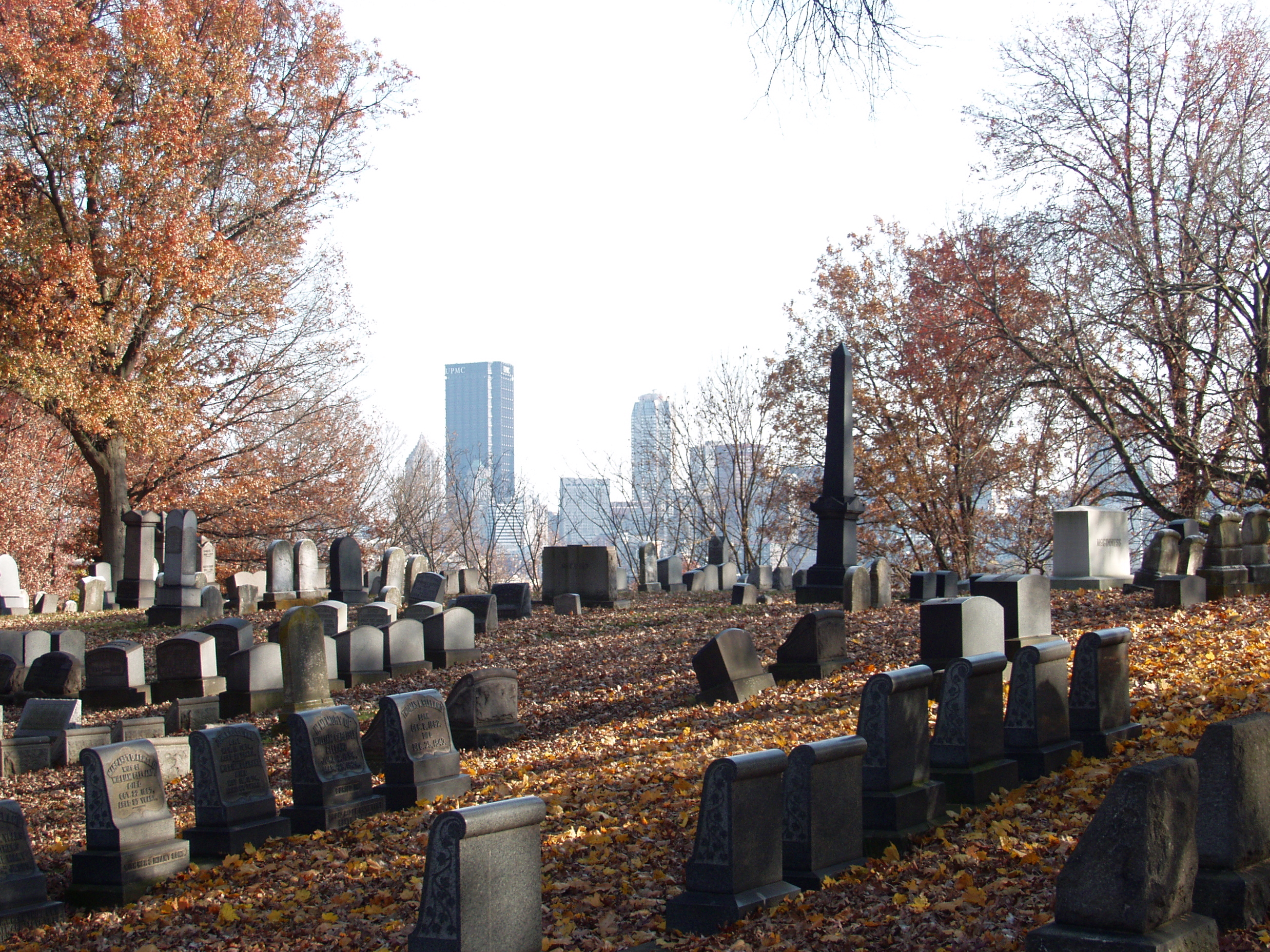
- Downtown Pittsburgh, from Union Dale Cemetery

Details
- Established: 1846
- Location: North Side, Pittsburgh, Pennsylvania
- Country: United States
- Coordinates: 40°27′49″N 80°01′17″W
- Size: 96 acres
- No. of graves: 38,500
- Website: Union Dale Cemetery

Union Dale Cemetery is a cemetery at 2200 Brighton Road, in Pittsburgh, Allegheny County, Pennsylvania, United States.

The cemetery is divided into three parts: Division 1 (north side), east of Brighton Road and north of Marshall Avenue; Division 2 (south side), east of Brighton Road and south of Marshall Avenue; Division 3 (west side), west of Brighton Road and south of Island Avenue. Divisions 1 and 2 are part of the Perry Hilltop neighborhood, and Division 3 is in the California-Kirkbride neighborhood, with Brighton Road the border between the neighborhoods.

== History ==
It was founded as Mount Union Cemetery in April 1846, by members of the First Associated Reformed Presbyterian Church of Allegheny. Its initial size was ten acres. Hilldale Cemetery was founded across the street in 1857. "On April 2, 1869, by virtue of an act of [Allegheny Borough] assembly of that date, Mount Union and Hilldale cemeteries were consolidated, under the name of Union Dale Cemetery."

In the leadup to the Battle of Gettysburg, Pittsburgh was under perceived threat, and part of the cemetery was commandeered in June 1863. Located on high ground and just downstream of where the Allegheny and Monongahela Rivers merged to form the Ohio, more than two miles of defensive fortifications were built in three weeks, "from Union Dale Cemetery to Troy Hill."

Allegheny Borough became Allegheny City in 1880, and the cemetery was described in 1886: "Uniondale Cemetery contains about 85 acres, and is located in the western part of the [Allegheny] city, about a mile northwest from the city hall. The total number of interments in Uniondale Cemetery since April 1846, is 19,645." Pittsburgh annexed Allegheny City in 1907, and the area became known as its "North Side."

Union Dale Cemetery contains the graves of eight Confederate soldiers, who died in Pittsburgh as prisoners of war. These were rediscovered in 1918: "Pittsburgh Chapter asks convention to assist in establishing identity eight Confederate prisoners of war who died in Pittsburgh in eighteen sixty-four. Confederates buried here and we are erecting memorial on their graves. Cemetery records lost."

== Notable burials ==
- Thomas McKee Bayne (1836-1894), U.S. Congressman
- Guy Edgar Campbell (1871-1940), U.S. Congressman
- Robert James Corbett (1905-1971), U.S. Congressman
- James John Davis (1873-1947), U.S. Senator and Secretary of Labor
- Thomas C. Duncan. His mausoleum was designed by architect Theophilus P. Chandler Jr., and the "Recording Angel" statue was created by sculptor Henry Jackson Ellicott.
- Gottlieb Luty (1842-1904), Medal of Honor recipient
- Edward "Cannonball" Morris (1862-1937), Major League Baseball pitcher
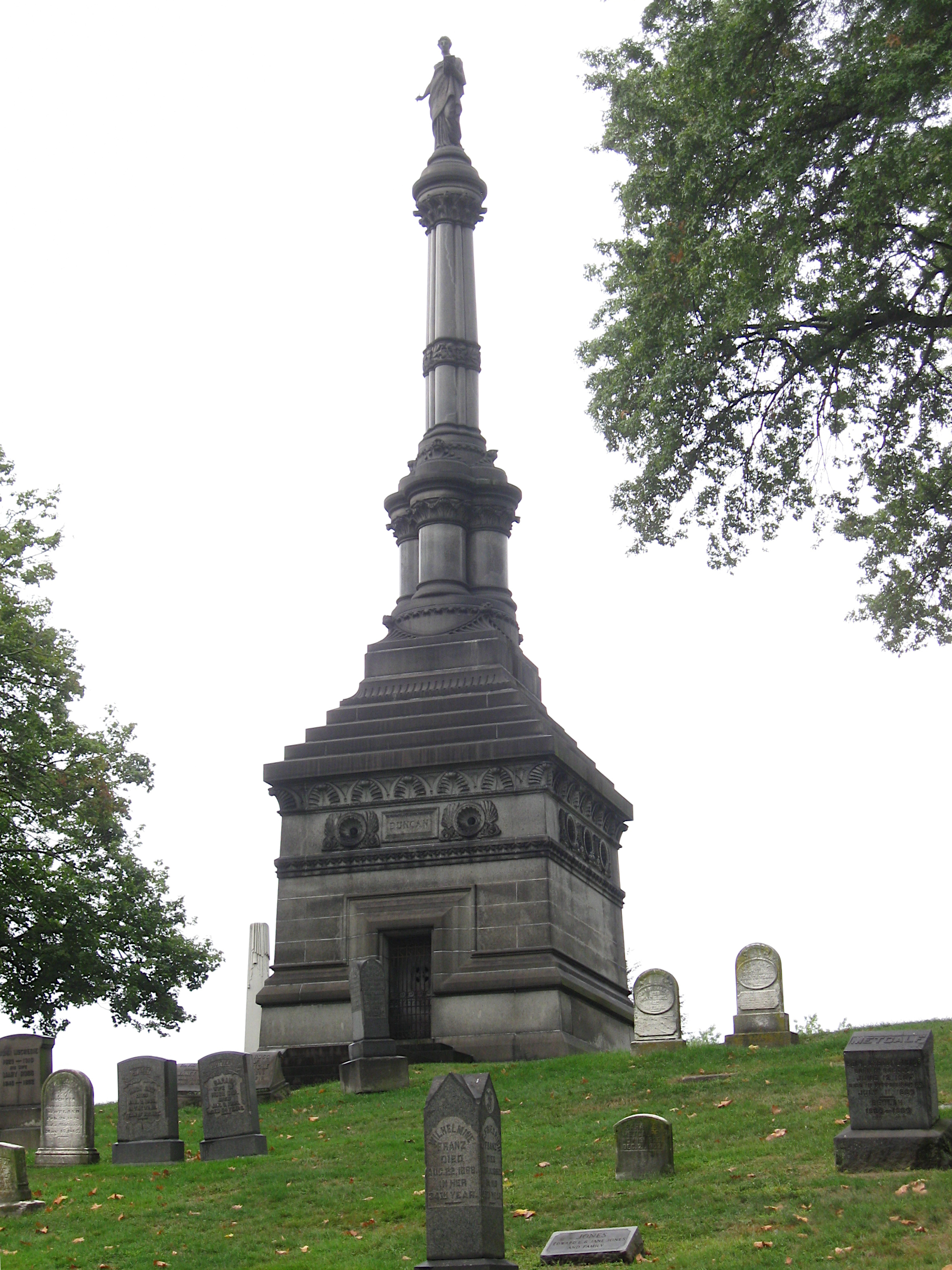
Duncan Mausoleum (1880), Theophilus P. Chandler, architect

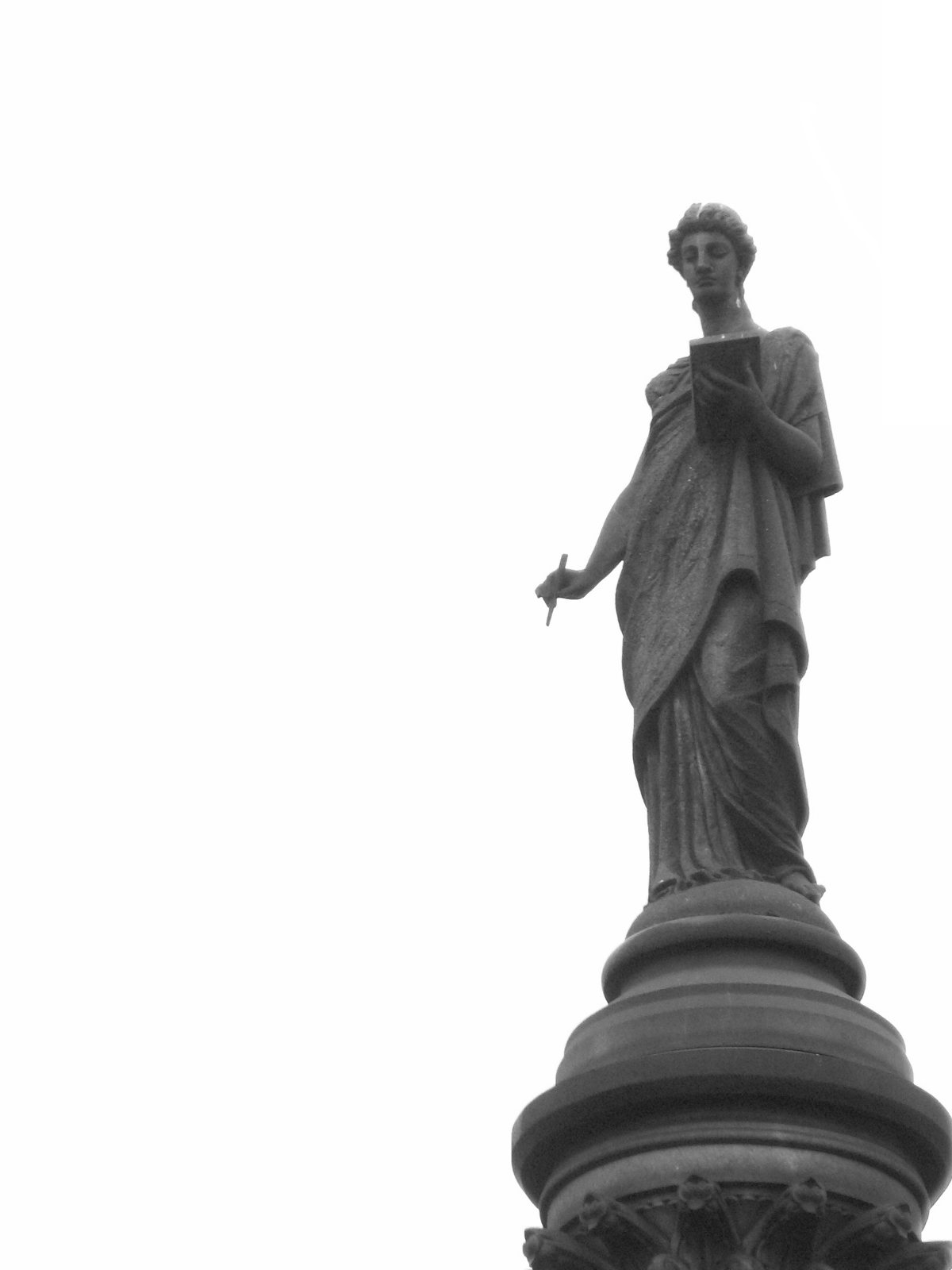
Recording Angel (1880) by Henry Jackson Ellicott, atop Duncan Mausoleum

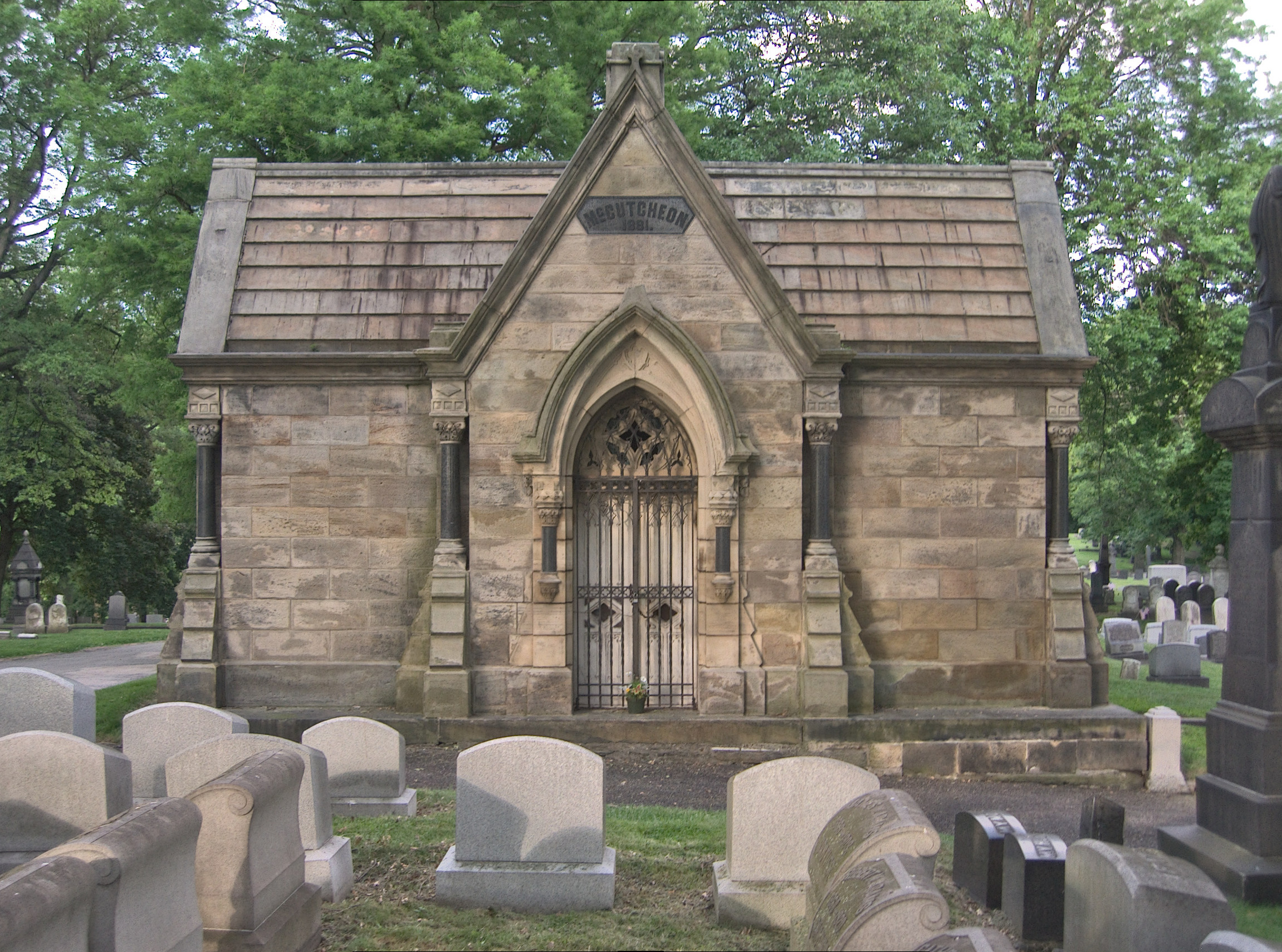
McCutcheon Mausoleum (1881)

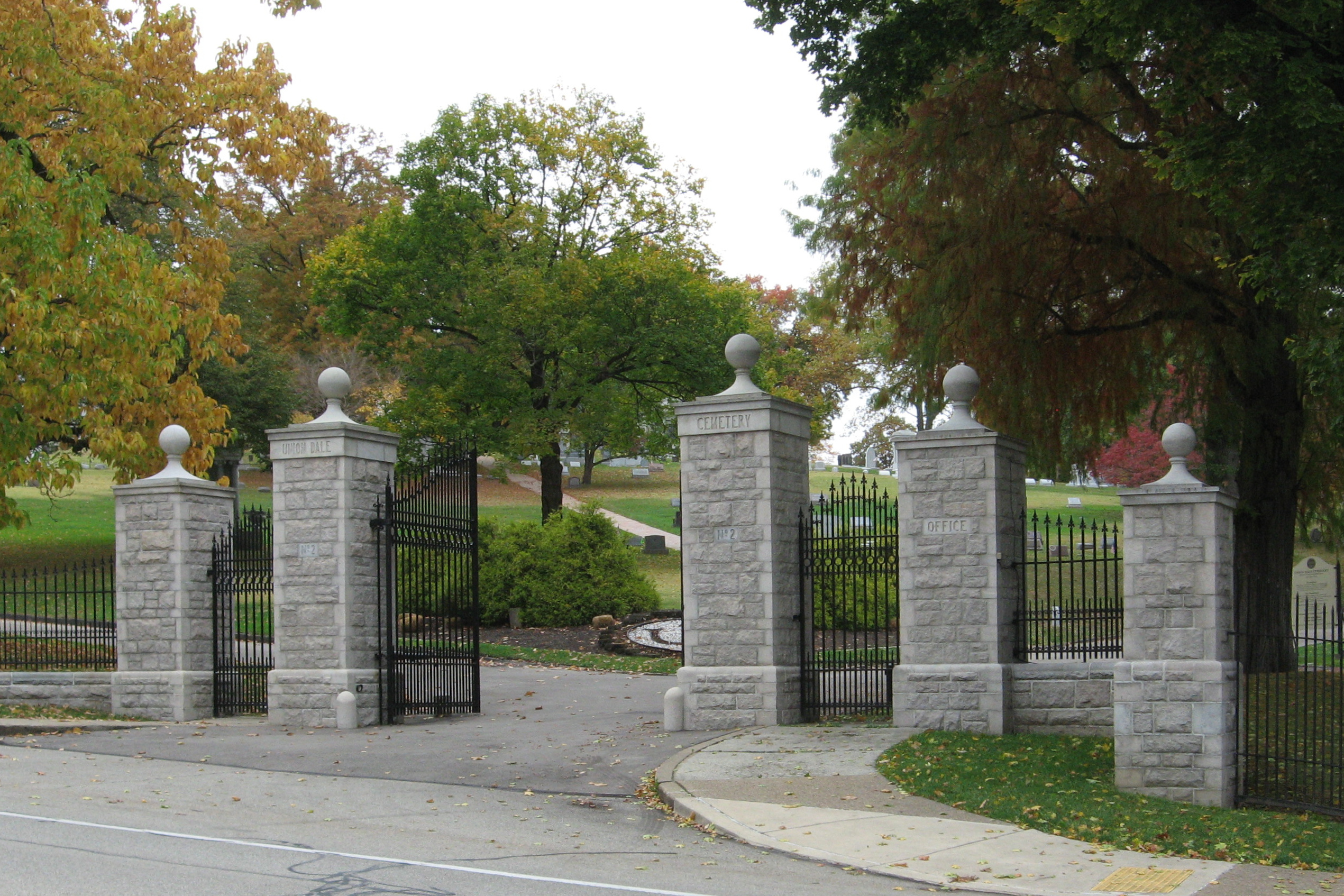
Gates to Division 2

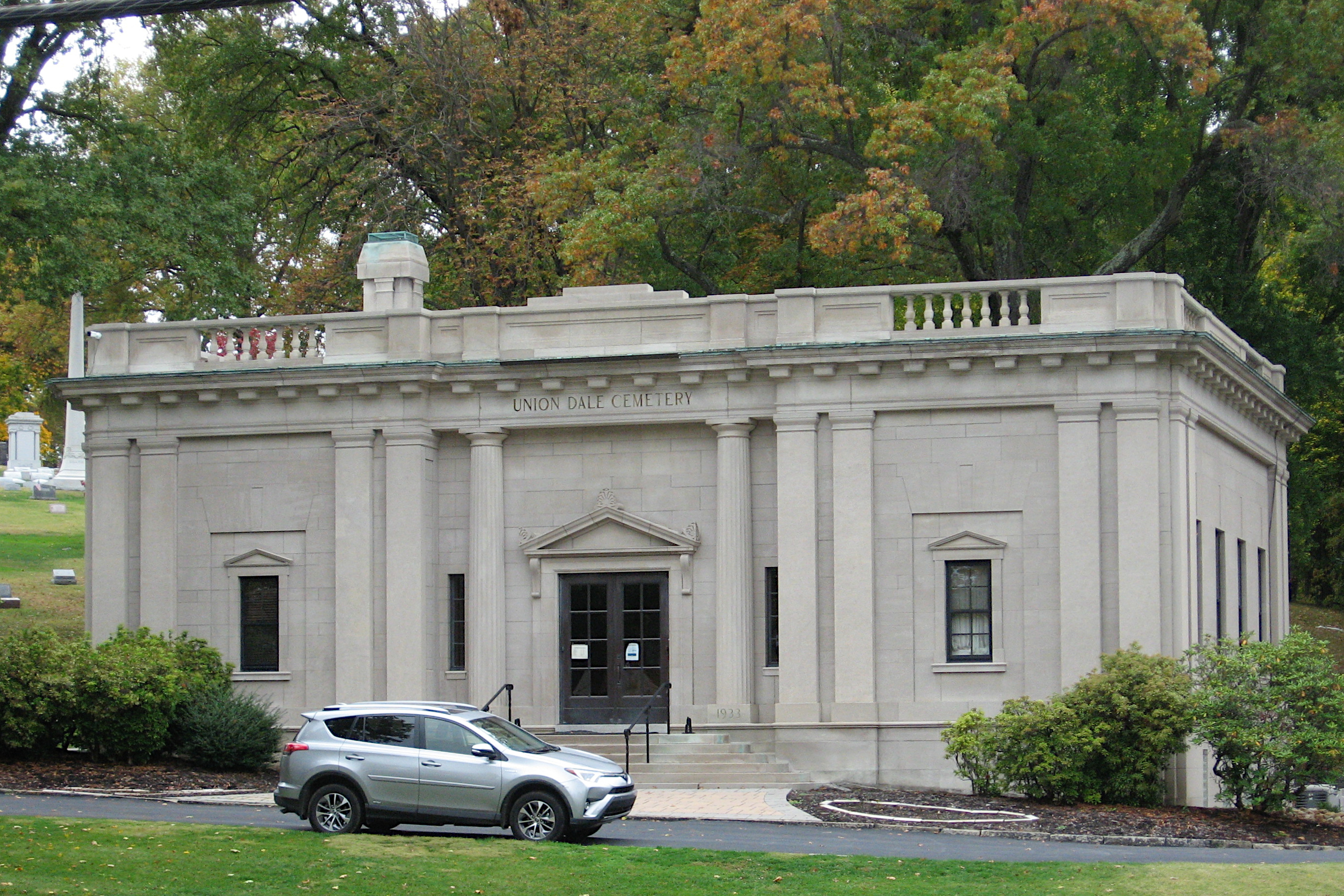
Union Dale Cemetery Office
