= Henry Jackson Ellicott =

American sculptor (1847–1901)

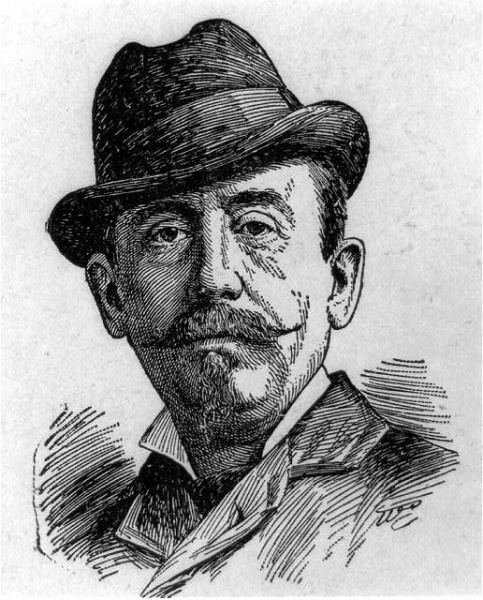
- Henry Jackson Ellicott, from National Cyclopaedia of American Biography (1904).
- Born: June 22 or 23, 1847; Annapolis, Maryland, U.S.
- Died: February 11, 1901 (aged 53); Washington, D.C., U.S.
- Resting place: Rock Creek Cemetery
- Education: Rock Hill College School; Gonzaga College High School; Georgetown Medical College
- Known for: Architectural sculpting
- Notable work: Equestrian statue of Winfield Scott Hancock (1889–1896); General George B. McClellan statue (1891–1894)
- Spouse: Lida Dyre (m. 1883)

Henry Jackson Ellicott (June 22 or 23, 1847, in Annapolis, Maryland – February 11, 1901, in Washington, D.C.) was an American sculptor and architectural sculptor, best known for his work on American Civil War monuments.

== Biography ==
The son of James P. Ellicott and Fannie Adelaide Ince, he attended Rock Hill College School in Ellicott City, Maryland, and Gonzaga College High School in Washington, D.C. He studied at Georgetown Medical College, and may have served in the Civil War.

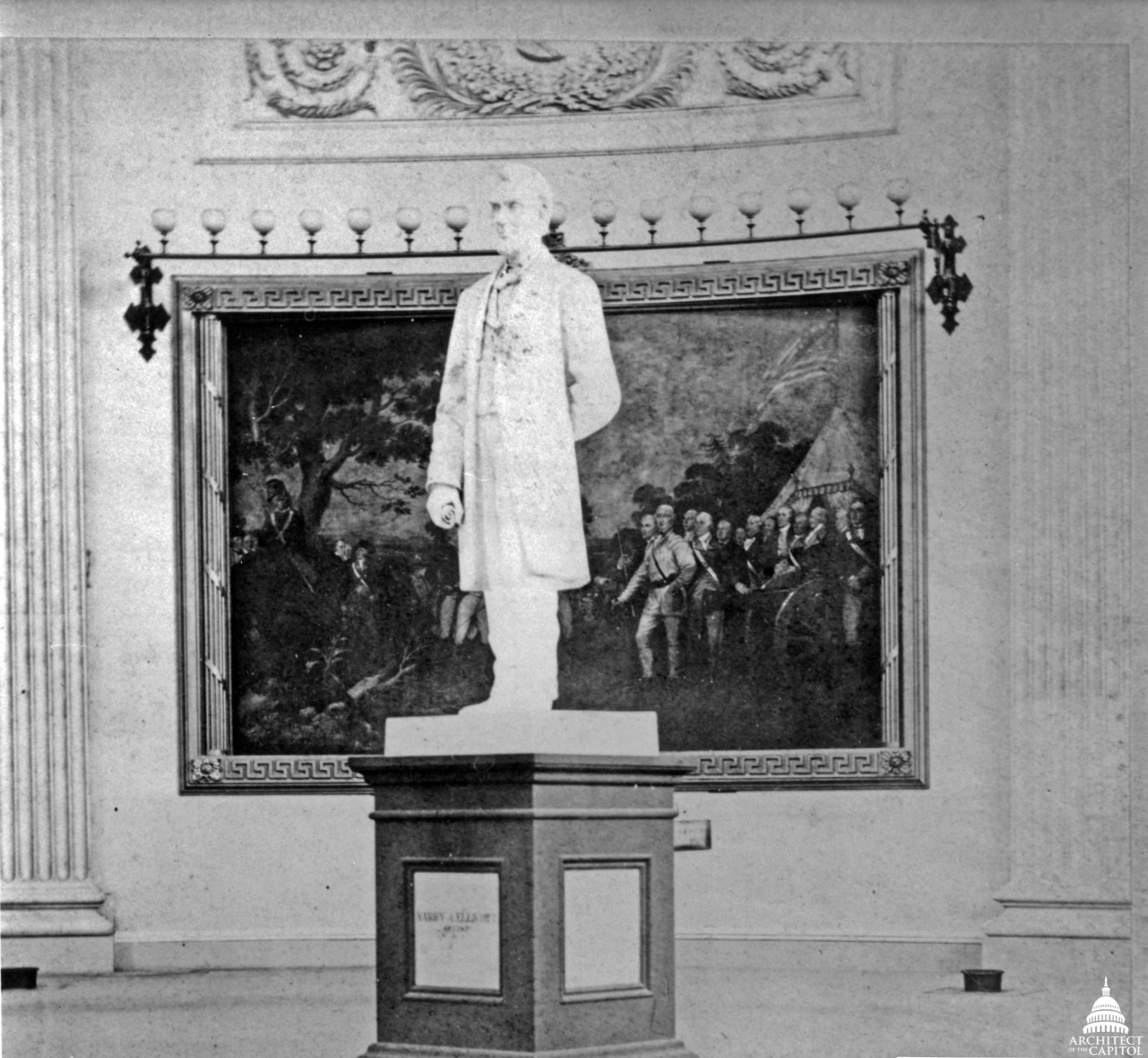
Ellicott's plaster of Abraham Lincoln in the Capitol Rotunda, 1866

At age 19, he completed a larger-than-life plaster statue of Abraham Lincoln – likely an entry in the Lincoln Monument Association's competition for a marble statue – that was exhibited for two years in the United States Capitol rotunda. The competition was won by sculptor Lot Flannery, whose statue is at District of Columbia City Hall. The fate of Ellicott's Lincoln statue is unknown.

He studied at the National Academy of Design, 1867–1870, under William Henry Powell and Emanuel Leutze; and later studied under Constantino Brumidi.

His first two commissions were for monuments at Mount Calvary Cemetery in Lothian, Maryland (1870) and Greenwood Cemetery in Laurel, Maryland. He was the likely modeler of an Infantryman statue for J. W. Fiske Architectural Metals, Inc. of New York City, that was mass-produced and used in numerous municipal Civil War monuments. Company records list the sculptor's name as "Allicot."

He moved to Philadelphia, Pennsylvania, and modeled architectural sculpture on buildings for the 1876 Centennial Exposition. He remained in Philadelphia, and exhibited occasionally at the Pennsylvania Academy of the Fine Arts between 1878 and 1891.

Ellicott was appointed Superintendent and Chief Modeler for the U.S. Treasury Department in 1889, responsible for all federal monuments. He moved to Washington, D.C. He died on February 11, 1901, in Washington, D.C. He was buried at Rock Creek Cemetery.

=== Personal ===
In 1883, he married Lida Dyre, of Maryland, a woman eighteen years his junior. They had no children.

== Selected works ==
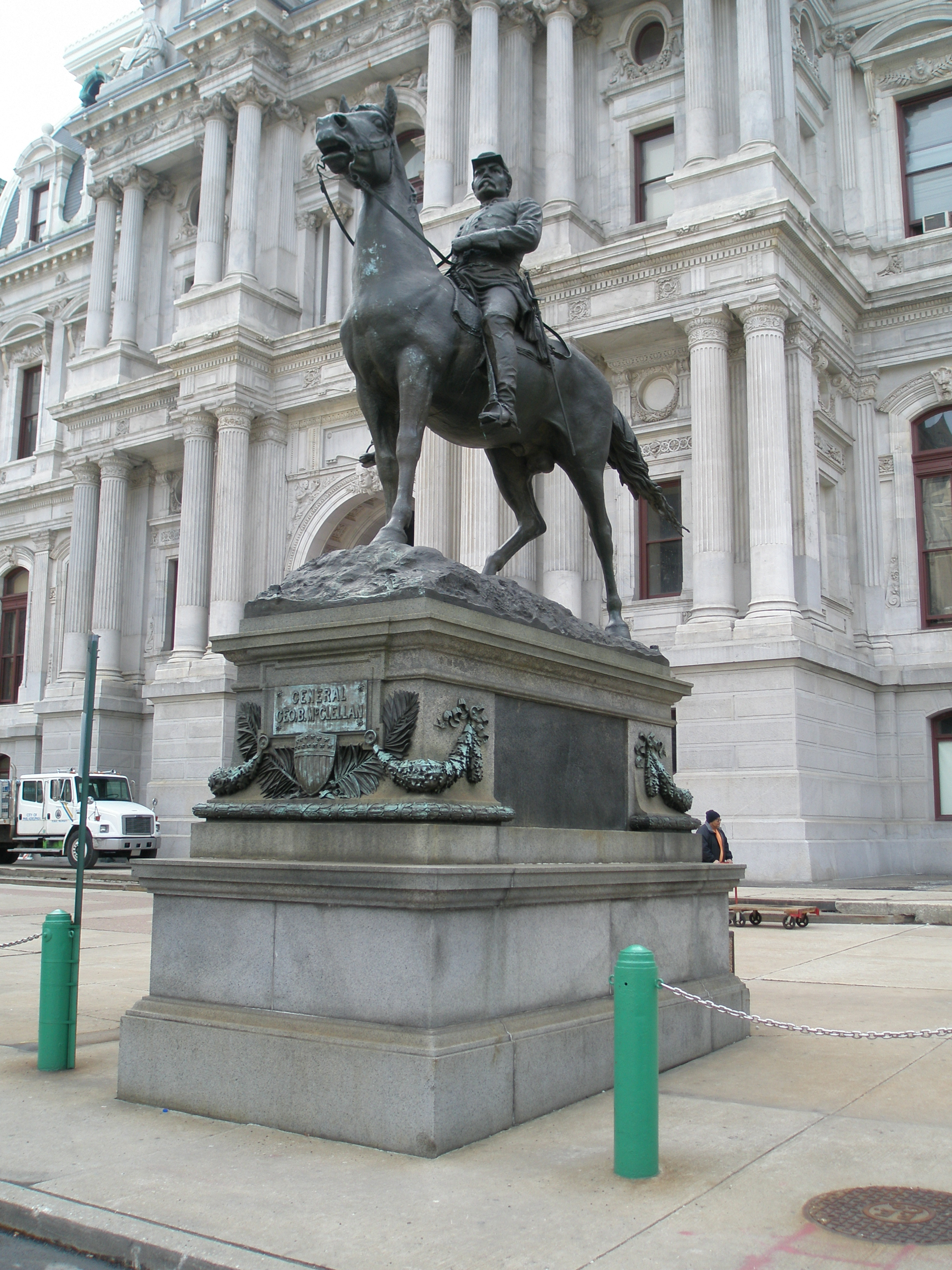
General George McClellan (1891–1894), City Hall, Philadelphia

- Abraham Lincoln, plaster, current whereabout unknown, ca. 1866. Exhibited in United States Capitol rotunda, 1866–1868.
- Goddess of Commerce, Goddess of Protection, Goddess of Mechanism, zinc, atop New England Mutual Life Insurance Building, Boston, Massachusetts, 1875, Nathaniel Jeremiah Bradlee, architect (demolished 1946). The figure group was once the symbol of the company, but the statues were melted down in a World War II scrap-metal drive.
- Recording Angel, atop Thomas P. Duncan Mausoleum, Union Dale Cemetery, Pittsburgh, Pennsylvania, 1880, Theophilus Parsons Chandler Jr., architect.
- Bas-relief portrait of John Sartain, bronze, Pennsylvania Academy of the Fine Arts, Philadelphia, Pennsylvania, ca. 1888
- Architectural sculpture: 33 Keystones (Ethnological Heads), granite, Library of Congress, Washington, D.C., 1891. Carved by Ellicott and William Boyd.
- Francis Elias Spinner, bronze, Myers Park, Herkimer, New York, 1894.
- Zebulon Baird Vance Monument, bronze, North Carolina State Capitol, Raleigh, North Carolina, 1899–1900.

=== Civil War monuments ===
- Goddess of Victory, bronze, atop Soldiers' Monument, Veterans Park, Holyoke, Massachusetts, 1875–76.
  - Ellicott also modeled the four bronze relief panels on the monument's base.
- Colonel James Cameron, granite with brass sword, Civil War Monument, Cameron Park, Sunbury, Pennsylvania, 1879.
- Infantryman, bronze, Civil War Monument, Lawrence, Massachusetts, 1881. The Sailor and Cavalry Officer figures were modeled by William Rudolf O'Donovan.
- Cavalryman, bronze, 2nd Pennsylvania Cavalry Monument, Gettysburg Battlefield, Gettysburg, Pennsylvania, 1887–1889.
- Kneeling Cavalryman, bronze, 1st Pennsylvania Cavalry Monument, Gettysburg Battlefield, Gettysburg, Pennsylvania, 1889–90.
- Equestrian statue of General Winfield Scott Hancock, bronze, Washington, D.C., 1889–1896.
- Equestrian statue of General George B. McClellan, bronze, City Hall, Philadelphia, Pennsylvania, 1891–1894.

=== Portrait busts ===
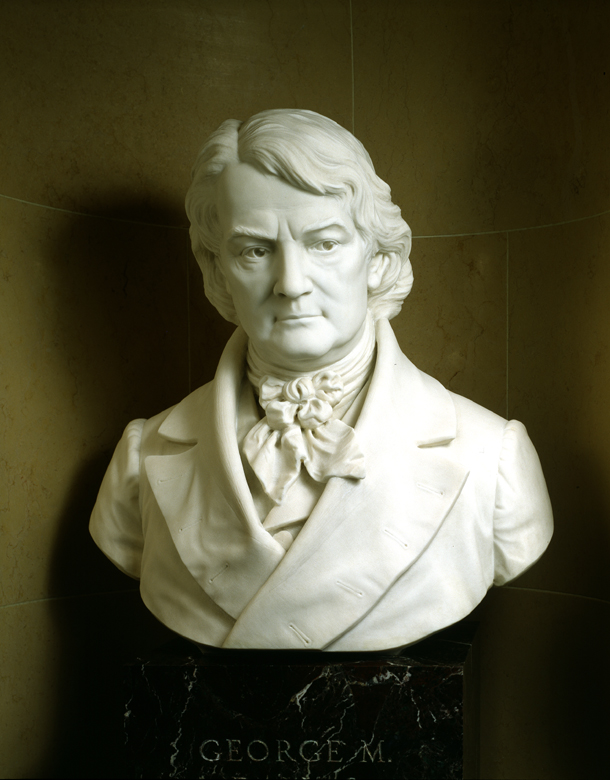
George M. Dallas (1893), U.S. Capitol, Washington, D.C.

- Vice-President George M. Dallas, marble, United States Senate Vice Presidential Bust Collection, United States Capitol, Washington, D.C., 1893
- Rear-Admiral George W. Melville, bronze, United States Naval Academy Museum, Annapolis, Maryland
- George Yost Coffin
- General John Schofield
- Senator Daniel W. Voorhees
- Samuel H. Kauffmann

=== Attributed works ===
- Infantryman, zinc, modeled by "Allicot" (Ellicott?) and mass-produced by J. W. Fiske Architectural Metals, Inc., New York City, from ca. 1875 to 1927. Examples in Saratoga, New York (1875), Chambersburg, Pennsylvania (1878), King Ferry, New York (1882), Arcadia, Missouri (1886), Norwalk, Connecticut (1889), Oak Bluffs, Massachusetts (1890), Martha's Vineyard, Massachusetts (1891), Pottstown, Pennsylvania (1893), Berlin, New York (1906), Iola, Kansas (1909), and North Kingston, Rhode Island (1912).
- Charles Evans, bronze, Charles Evans Cemetery, Reading, Pennsylvania. The undated statue is signed "ELLICOTT SC." and was cast by Bureau Brothers Foundry in Philadelphia.
- Statuette of Franklin Pierce, bronzed composition metal, New Hampshire Historical Society, Concord, New Hampshire, c.1896, height: 27 in (69 cm) Likely Ellicott's entry in the 1896 design competition for a statue (unexecuted) for the New Hampshire State House.
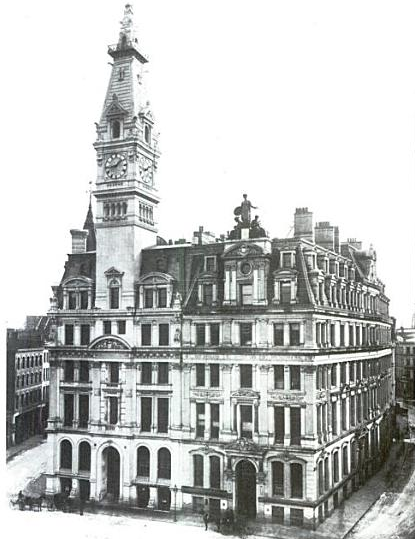
New England Mutual Life Insurance Building, (1875, demolished 1946), Boston, Massachusetts. Statues destroyed, 1945

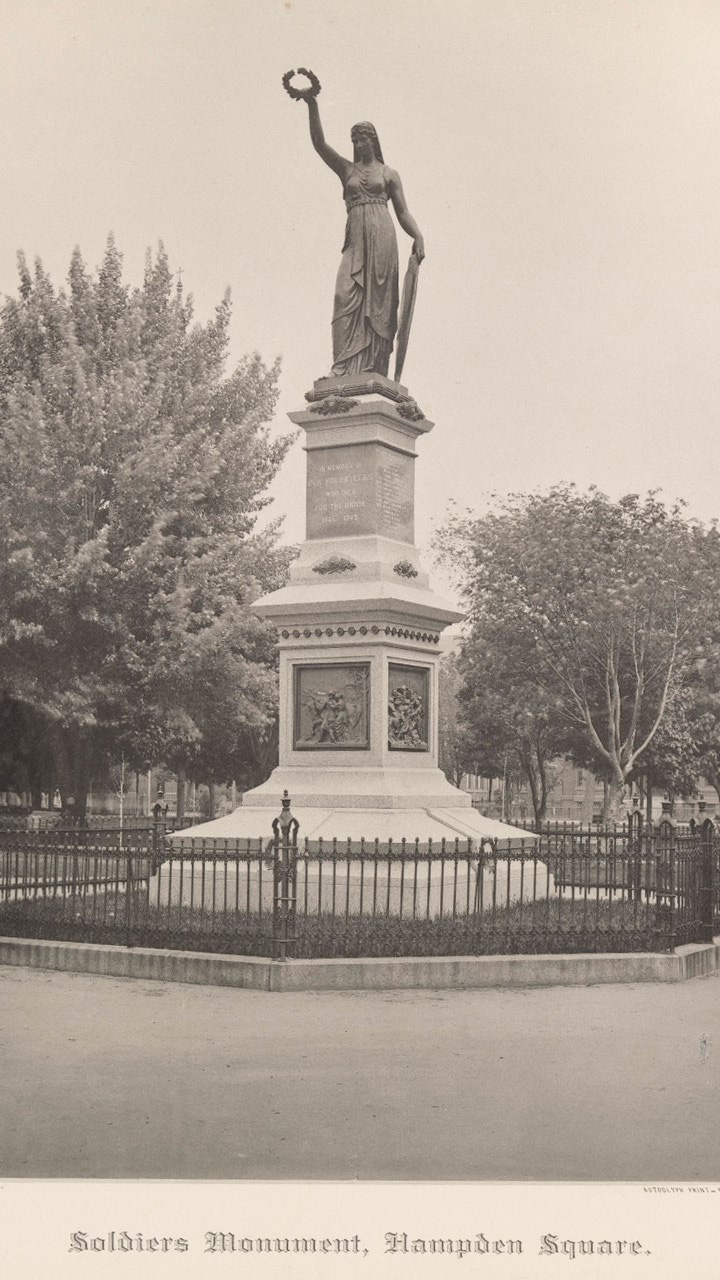
Soldiers Monument (1875–76), Holyoke, Massachusetts

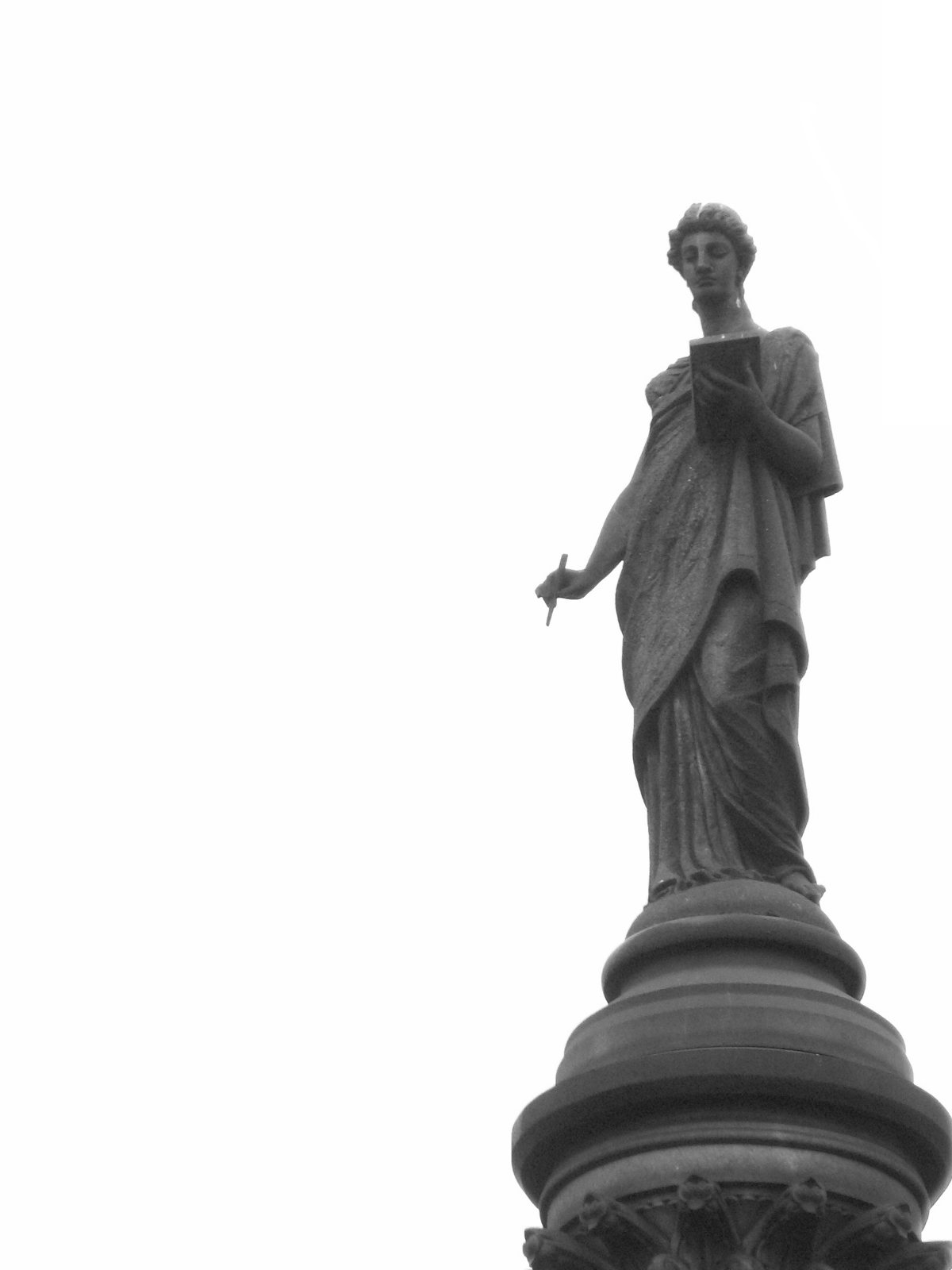
Recording Angel (1880), Duncan Mausoleum, Pittsburgh, Pennsylvania

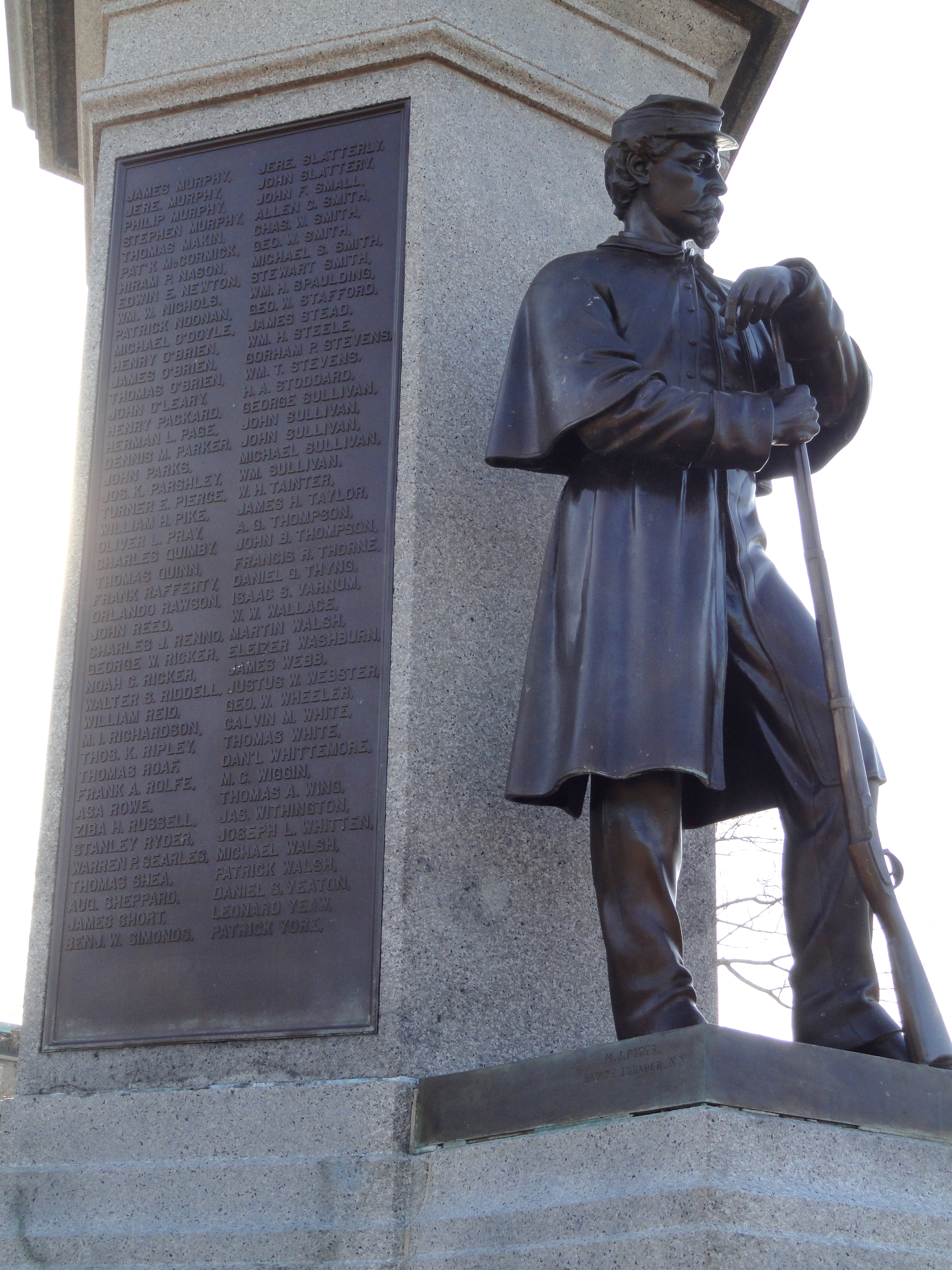
Infantryman (1881), Civil War Monument, Lawrence, Massachusetts

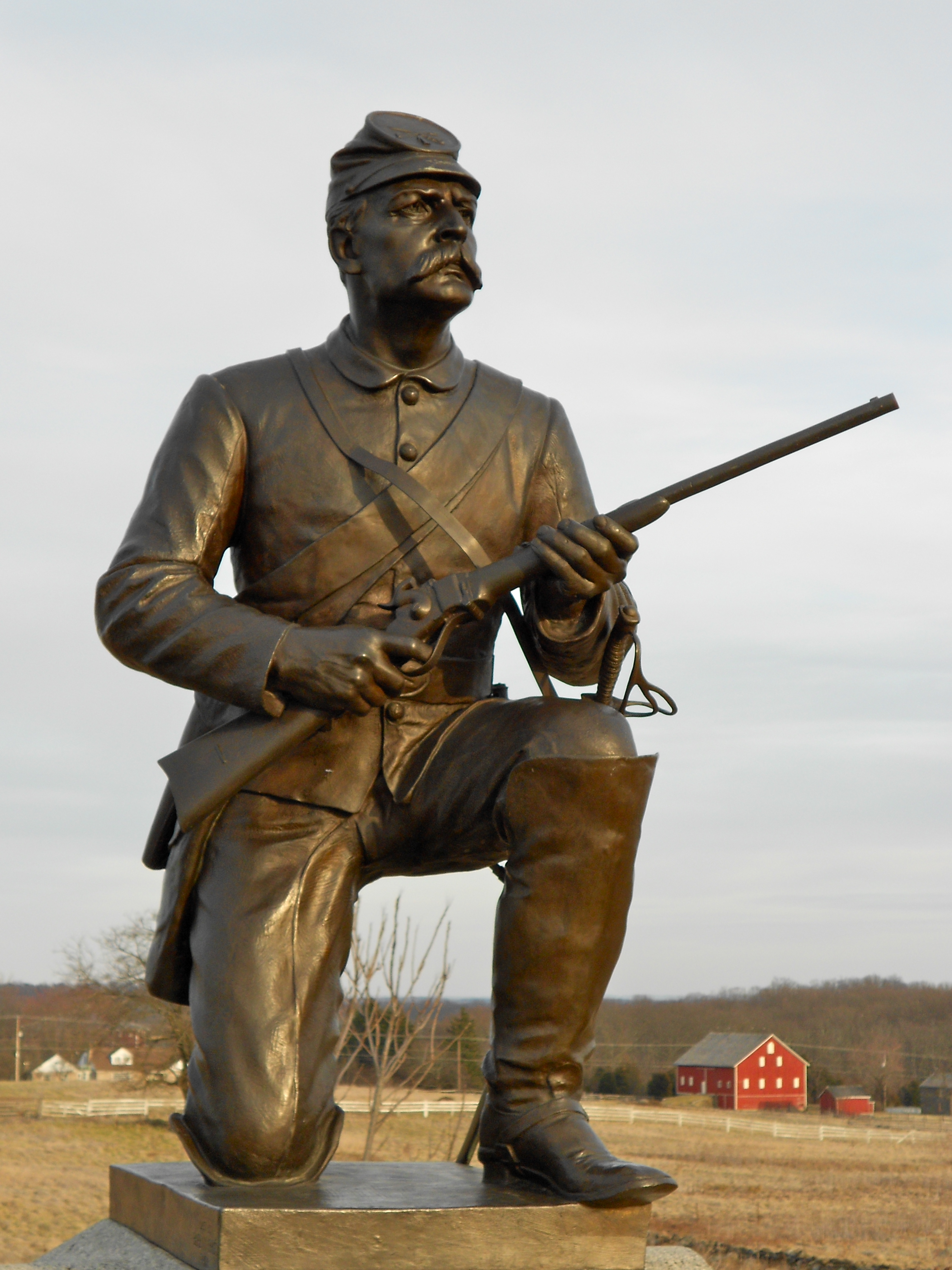
1st Pennsylvania Cavalry Monument (1889–90), Gettysburg Battlefield, Gettysburg, Pennsylvania

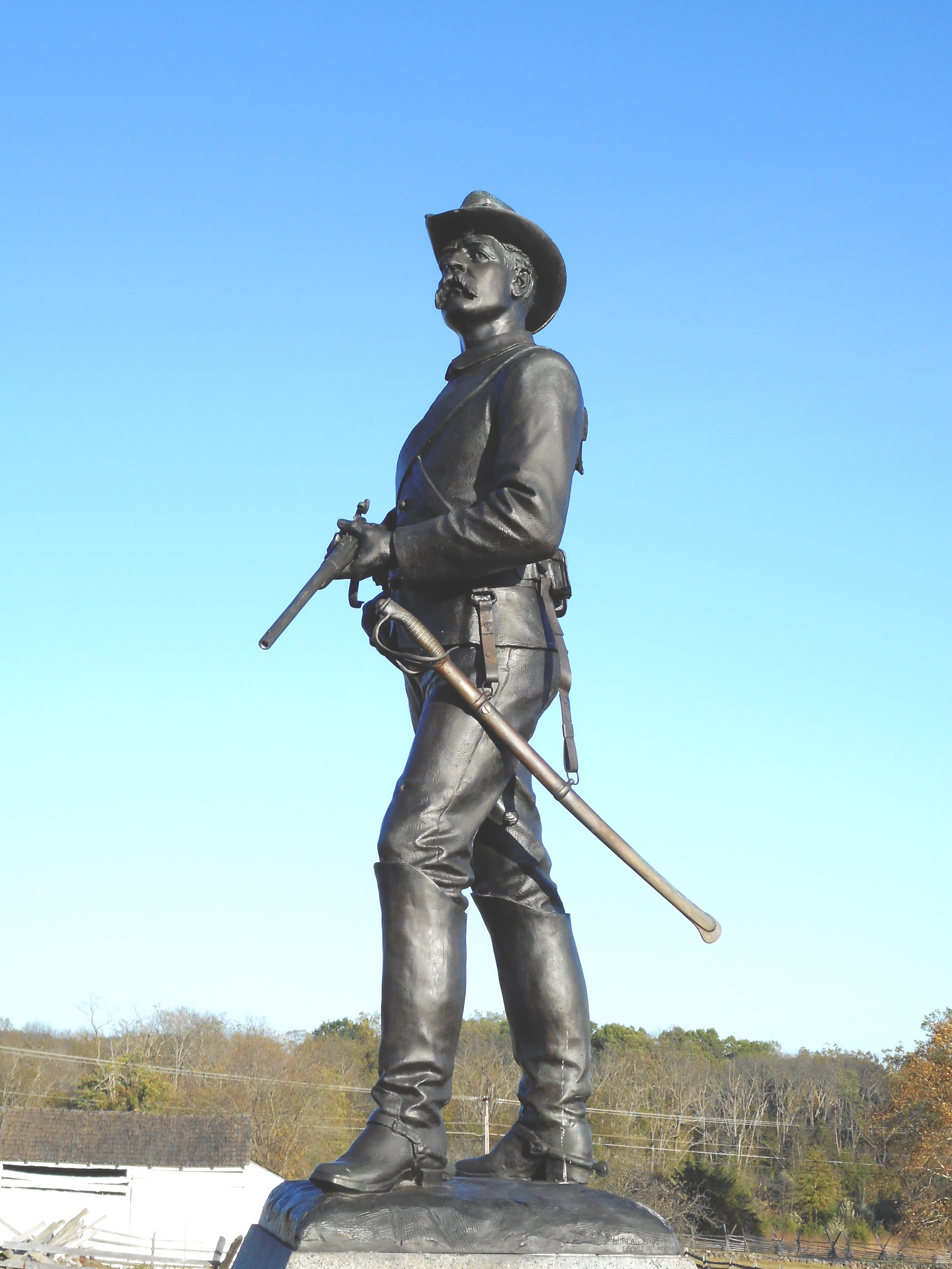
2nd Pennsylvania Cavalry Monument (1889), Gettysburg Battlefield, Gettysburg, Pennsylvania

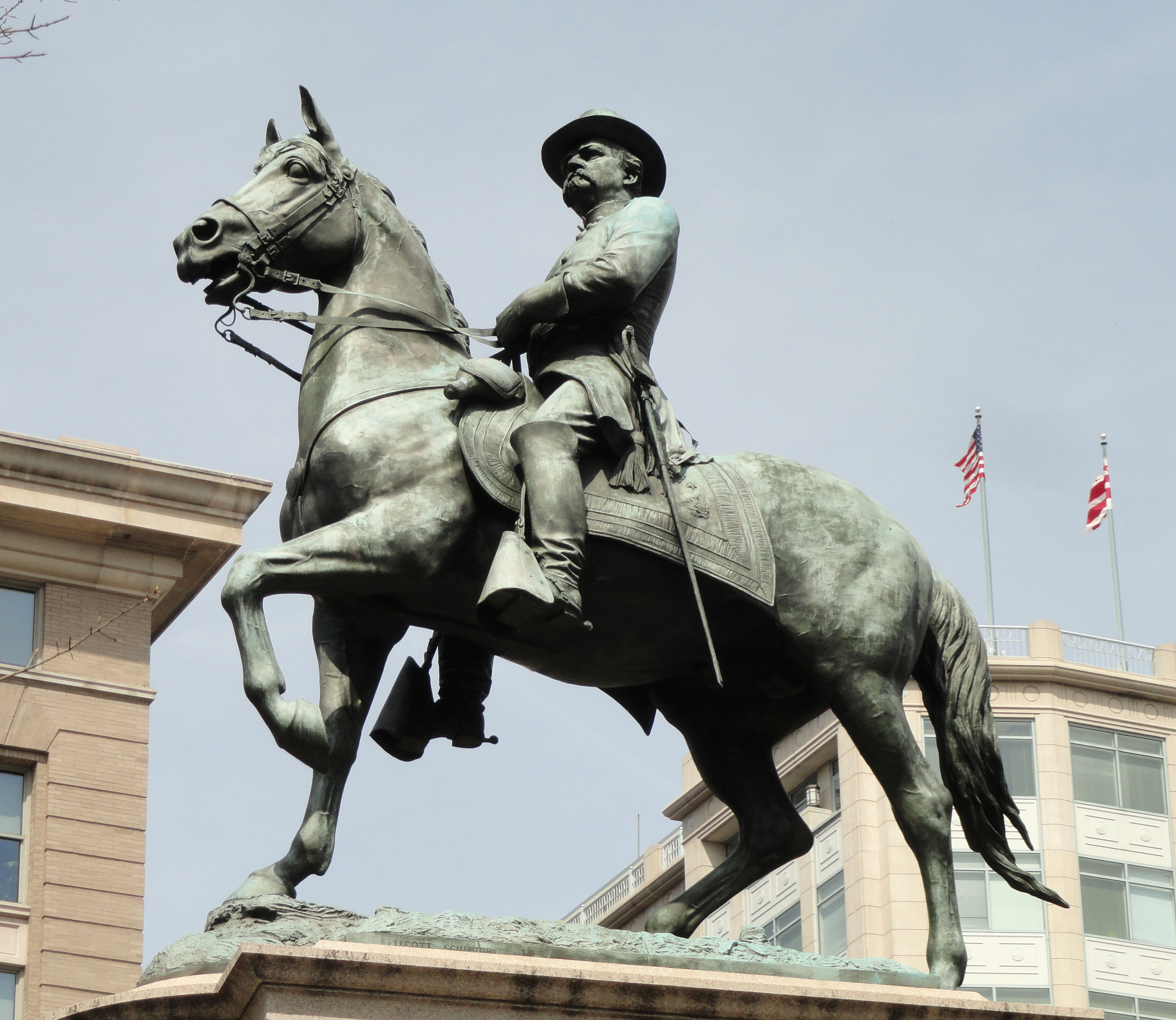
General Winfield Scott Hancock Memorial (1889–1896), Washington, D.C.

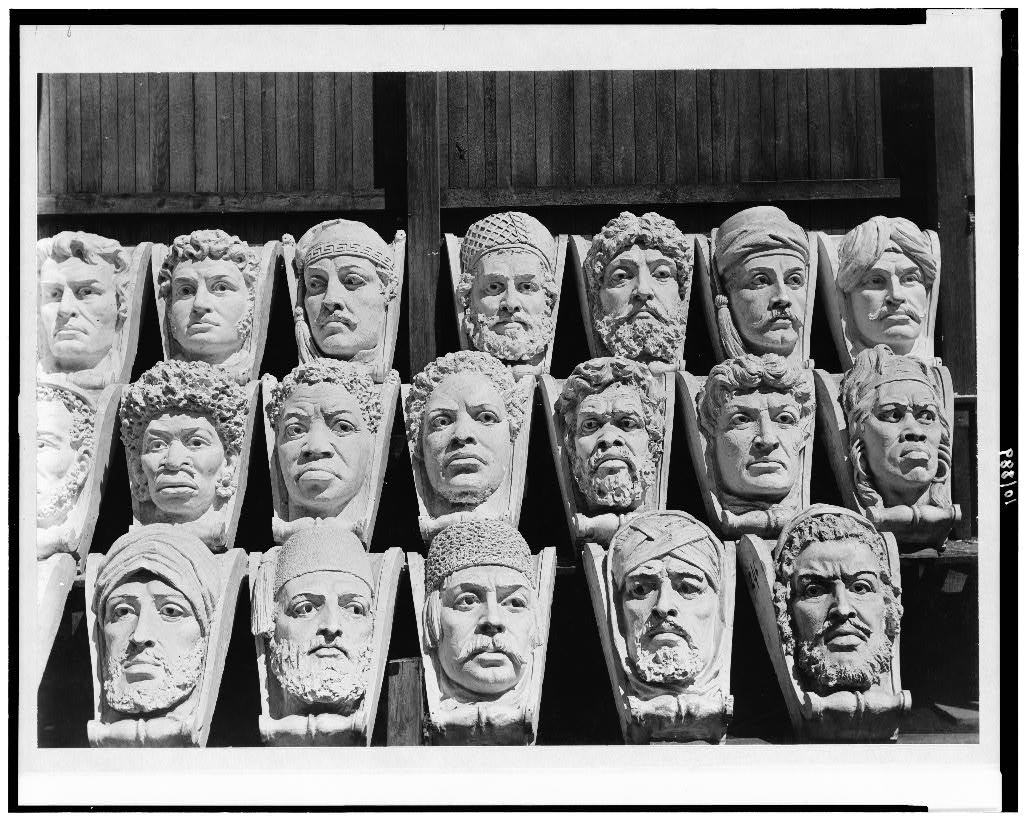
Ethnological Heads (1891), Library of Congress, Washington, D.C. The 33 keystones were carved by Ellicott and William Boyd.

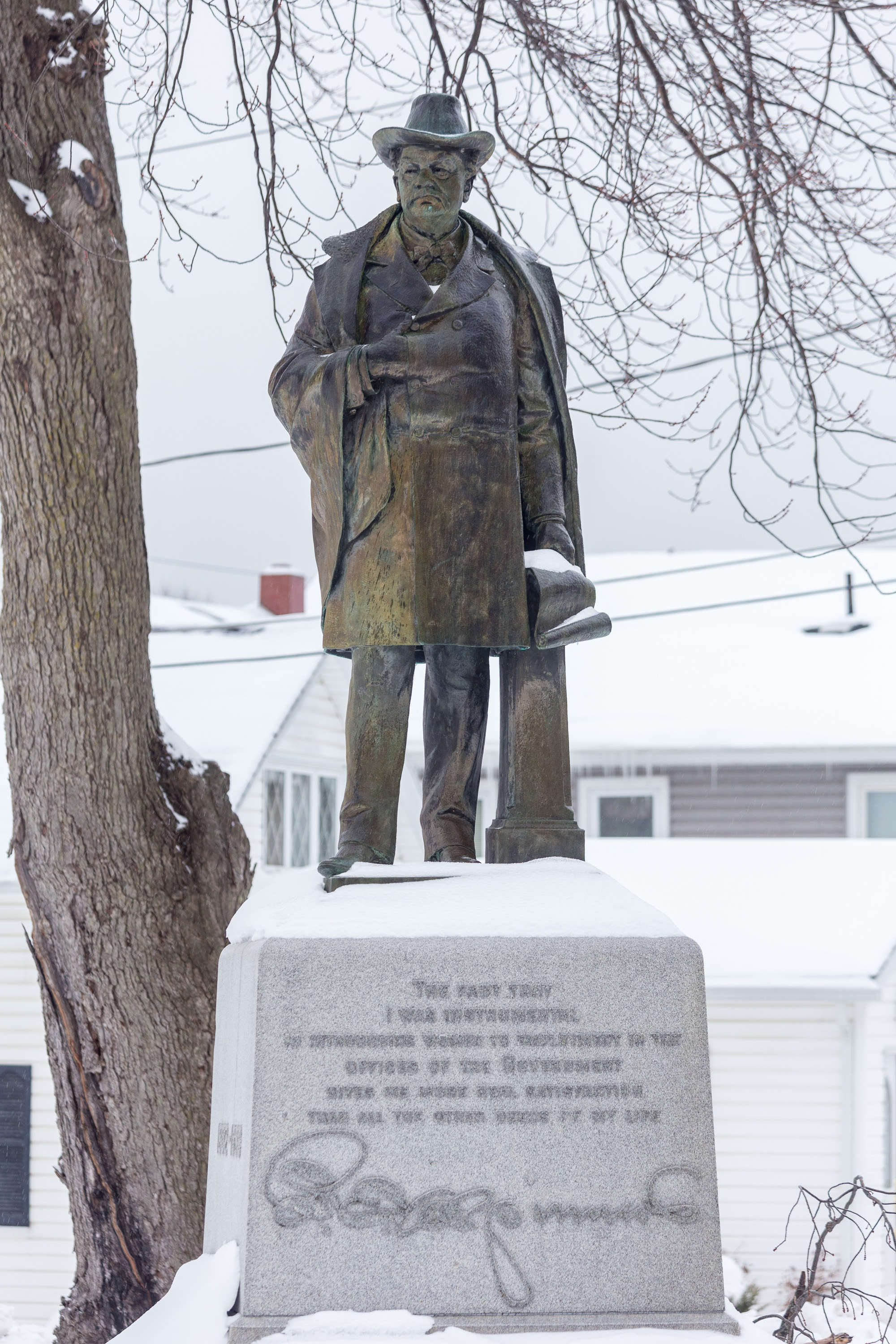
Francis E. Spinner (1894), Herkimer, New York

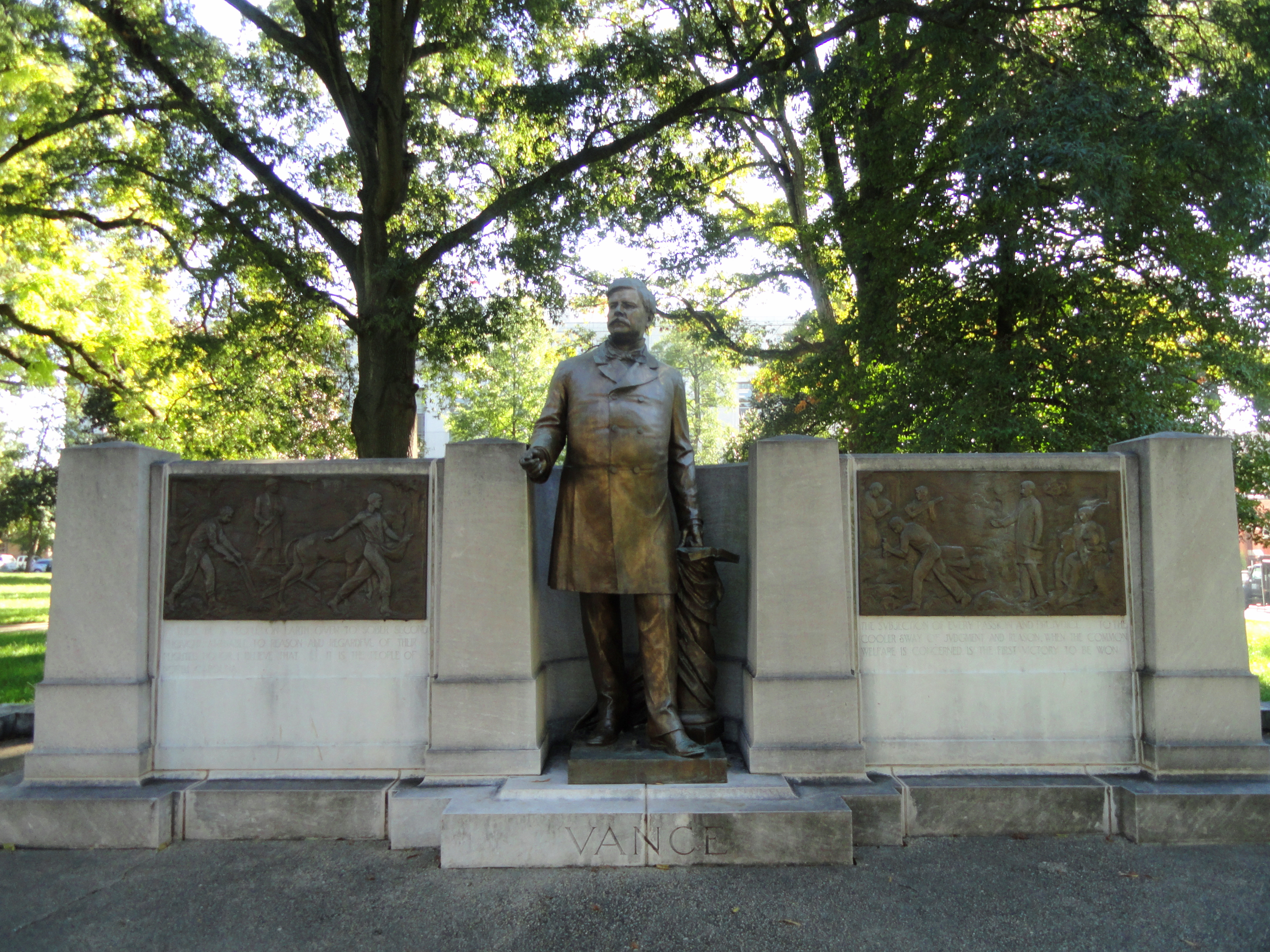
Vance Monument (1899-1900), North Carolina State Capitol, Raleigh

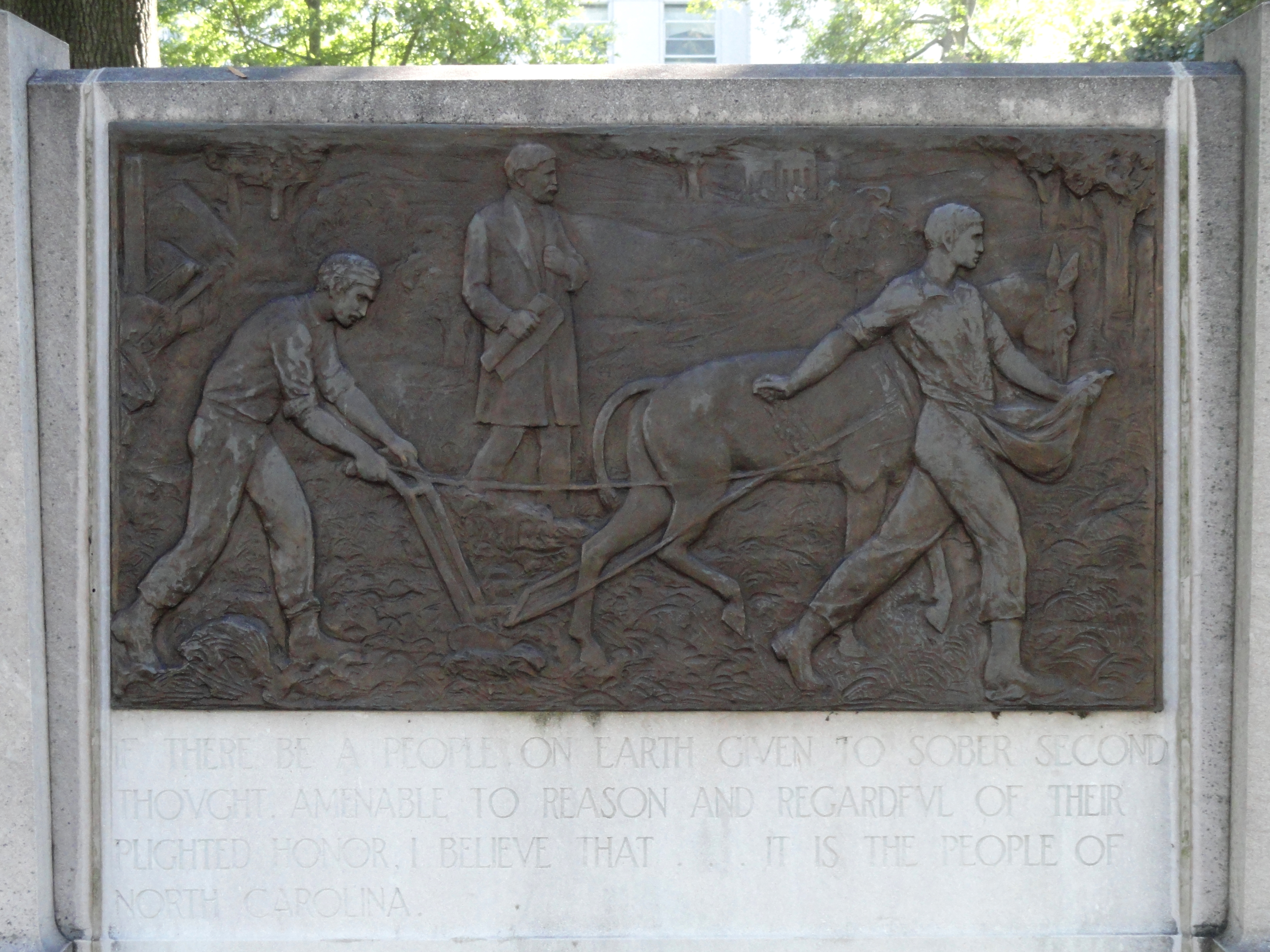
Vance Monument relief

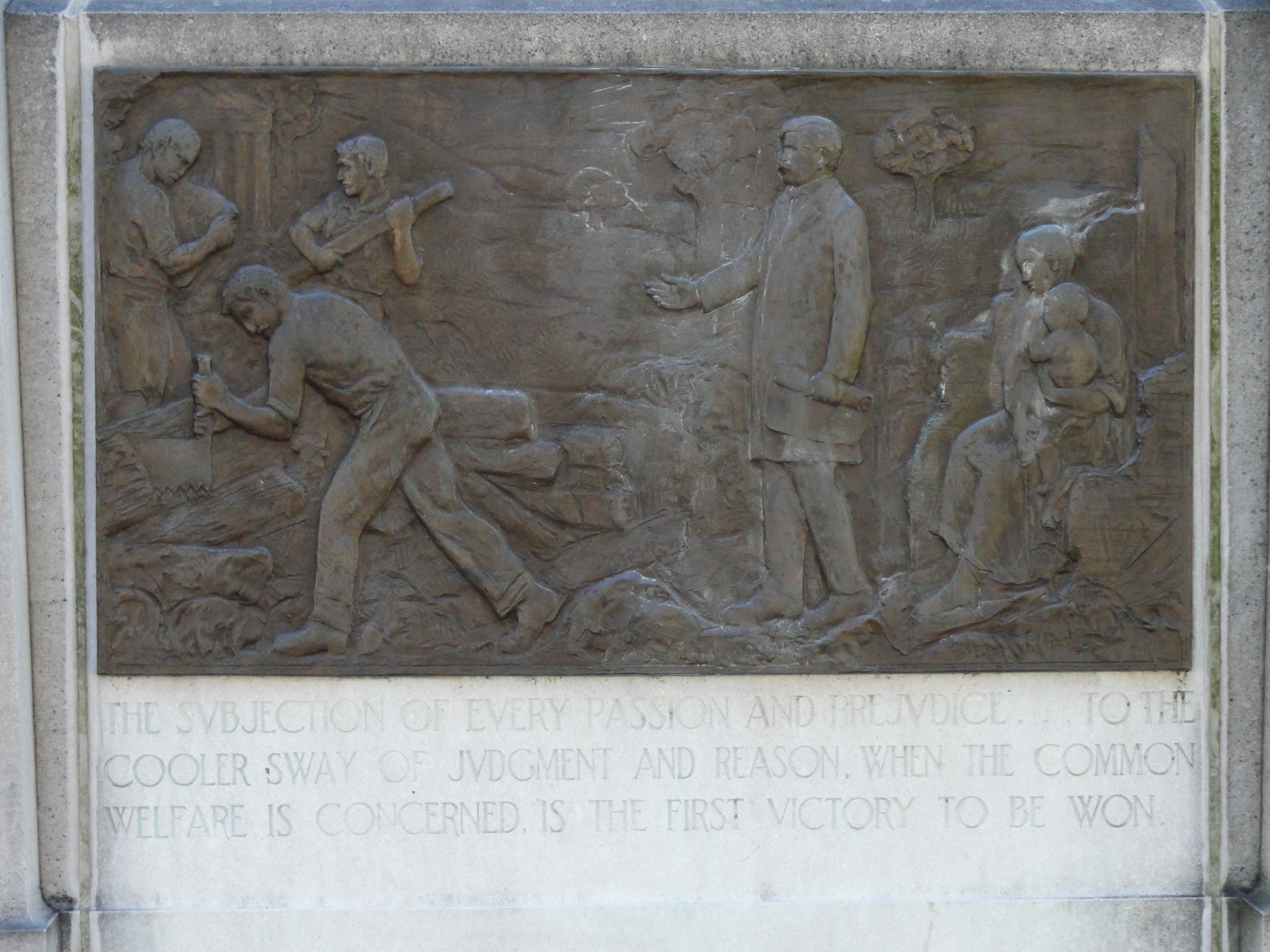
Vance Monument relief
