= Pennsylvania Route 136 =

State highway in Pennsylvania, US

Pennsylvania Route 136

Route information
- Maintained by PennDOT
- Length: 44.8 mi (72.1 km)
- Existed: September 1964–present

Major junctions
- West end: US 40 / PA 18 in Washington
- US 19 in Washington; I-70 / I-79 in Washington; PA 519 in Eighty Four PA Turnpike 43 near New Eagle; PA 51 near New Eagle PA Turnpike 66 in Hempfield Township
- East end: US 30 in Greensburg

Location
- Country: United States
- State: Pennsylvania
- Counties: Washington, Allegheny, Westmoreland

Highway system
- Pennsylvania State Route System; Interstate; US; State; Scenic; Legislative
← PA 135	→ PA 137

Pennsylvania Route 136 (PA 136) is a 40-mile-long (64 km) state highway located in Washington, Allegheny, and Westmoreland counties in Pennsylvania. The western terminus is at US 40 and PA 18 in Washington. The eastern terminus is at US 30 in Greensburg.

PA 136 was established in September 1964 to replace the stretch of PA 31 from Greensburg to Washington while the section west of Washington was re-designated as PA 844.

== Route description ==
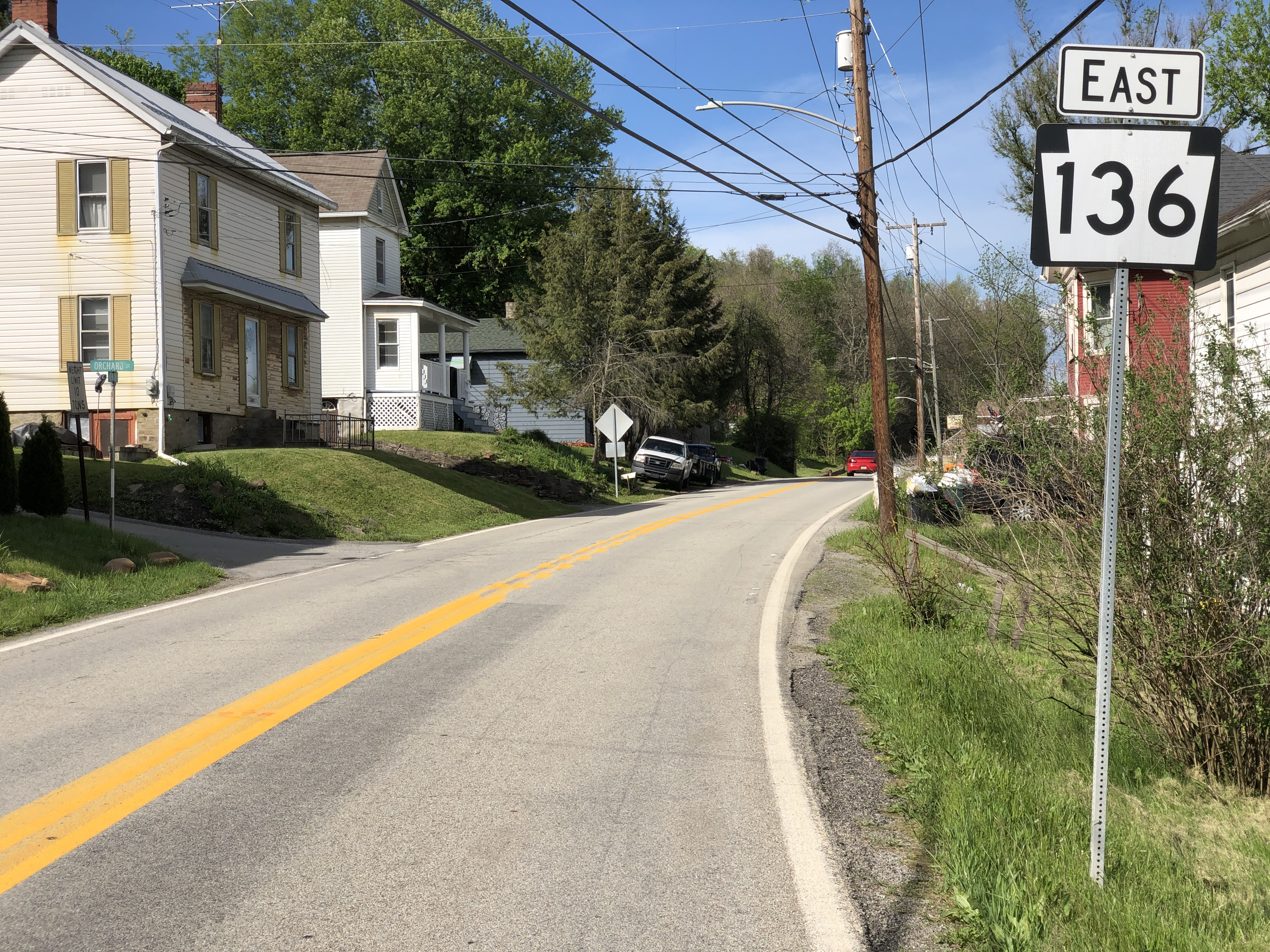
PA 136 eastbound in Arona

=== Washington County ===
PA 136 begins at an intersection with US 40/PA 18 in the city of Washington in Washington County, heading east on two-lane undivided West Beau Street. The road heads through the commercial downtown of Washington, becoming East Beau Street at the Main Street junction. The route intersects the one-way pair carrying US 19 as it passes through the Washington & Jefferson College campus. PA 136 heads into residential areas and enters the borough of East Washington, turning to the northeast. The road heads into South Strabane Township and comes to an interchange with I-70/I-79, at which point it becomes a divided highway. Past this interchange, the route becomes undivided again and passes a few businesses before continuing past more homes. PA 136 winds east through areas of woods and housing developments before heading through a mix of farmland and woodland with a few residences. The road becomes the border between North Strabane Township to the north and South Strabane Township to the south as it heads into more industrial areas as an unnamed road. The route passes over the Allegheny Valley Railroad's W&P Subdivision line and comes to an intersection with PA 519 in Eighty Four, at which point it crosses into Somerset Township. PA 136 continues east through areas of farms and woods with occasional homes. The road winds to the northeast and becomes the border between Nottingham Township to the north and Somerset Township to the south, passing through Dunningsville. The route heads east through more agricultural areas with a few woods and residences, heading southeast into more wooded areas of homes, running through Kammerer. PA 136 turns northeast and fully enters Somerset Township again, running through more rural areas. The road becomes the border between Nottingham Township and Somerset Township again. The route forms the border between Nottingham Township to the north and Fallowfield Township to the south as it curves northeast again and continues through more wooded areas with some fields and homes. PA 136 turns east and heads through residential areas, turning southeast onto Dry Run Road as it becomes the border between Carroll Township to the north and Fallowfield Township to the south. A short distance later, the road comes to Ginger Hill and intersects the northern terminus of PA 917.

Here, the route turns east into Carroll Township, passing through woodland and coming to an interchange with the PA 43 toll road, where it becomes a divided highway. Following this interchange, PA 136 becomes undivided and heads through wooded areas with some homes, crossing under a Wheeling and Lake Erie Railway line and passing through Baidland. The road runs east-northeast through areas of fields and woods with some homes, curving east into woodland as it forms the border between the borough of New Eagle to the north and Carroll Township to the south. PA 136 turns northeast through more woods with some homes, running along the border between New Eagle to the northwest and the city of Monongahela to the southeast briefly before fully entering Monongahela. The route heads north to an intersection with PA 88/PA 837, turning east to form a concurrency with the two routes on West Main Street, a three-lane road with a center left-turn lane. The road passes businesses before heading into residential areas as a two-lane road, turning southeast and heading through the commercial downtown of Monongahela. The three routes intersect PA 481 and become East Main Street, crossing Norfolk Southern's Ellsworth Secondary railroad line. The road passes more businesses as a four-lane divided highway, with PA 837 splitting to the southeast and PA 88/PA 136 becoming unnamed. A short distance later, PA 136 splits from PA 88 by turning northeast onto a two-lane undivided road, heading onto the Monongahela City Bridge that carries the route over PA 837 and Norfolk Southern's Mon Line before crossing over the Monongahela River.

=== Allegheny and Westmoreland counties ===
In the middle of the river, PA 136 crosses into Forward Township in Allegheny County and passes over more of the river before heading over CSX's Mon Subdivision railroad line. After leaving the Monongahela City Bridge, the route briefly becomes a divided highway and curves east-southeast onto Bunola River Road. The road becomes undivided again and passes between woodland to the north and industry to the south with the CSX line and the Monongahela River located further south. PA 136 curves east at the residential community of Manown and becomes Rainbow Run Road. The road passes more woods and industrial establishments before running through Gallatin and Sunny Side. Farther east, the route passes between woods to the north and the railroad tracks to the south, coming to an intersection with PA 906 in Milesville. At this point, PA 136 curves northeast away from the river and runs through dense woodland with a few homes. The road passes through the center of Beckets Run Woodlands, the 2015 National Outstanding Tree Farm of the Year and agricultural fields as it reaches an interchange with PA 51, turning east and crossing into Elizabeth Township immediately after the interchange. Here, the route becomes West Newton Road and heads through wooded areas with some farm fields and homes, briefly turning southeast before heading east again.

PA 136 enters Rostraver Township in Westmoreland County and becomes an unnamed road, running through more farmland and woodland with a few homes and curving east-southeast. The road turns east and intersects PA 201, becoming West Main Street at this point. The route passes through more woods with some businesses before crossing into the borough of West Newton and heading through residential areas. PA 136 passes a few businesses before turning southeast and crossing the Youghiogheny River. Here the route becomes East Main Street and crosses CSX's Keystone Subdivision railroad line, heading through the commercial downtown of West Newton. The road passes more homes before turning south and forming the border between residential West Newton to the west and wooded South Huntingdon Township to the east. The route turns east, fully entering South Huntingdon Township and becoming Mt. Pleasant Road as it passes farm fields and a few homes. PA 136 comes to an intersection with PA 31, with that route continuing east on Mt. Pleasant Road and PA 136 turning north-northeast onto Greensburg Pike.

The road passes through rural areas of homes, curving to the east-northeast. The route heads into wooded areas and crosses the Sewickley Creek into Sewickley Township and turns southeast, heading through a mix of farmland and woodland with a few residences. PA 136 turns northeast and runs through more agricultural areas with a few woods and homes. The road winds northeast through more rural areas before heading into the borough of Madison and passing residences. The route turns northwest onto Main Street and runs through more residential areas, turning northeast onto an unnamed road and crossing into Hempfield Township. PA 136 passes through wooded areas with some homes, heading north. The road heads into a mix of farmland and woodland with some homes, turning east in the residential community of Darragh. The road runs through areas of homes with some commercial development, passing over I-76 (Pennsylvania Turnpike) before turning northeast and entering the borough of Arona. Here, the route passes homes before crossing back into Hempfield Township. PA 136 continues through more agricultural areas and woodland with a few residences, curving east. The road heads through dense woods, turning northeast again. The route turns east onto a four-lane divided highway and comes to an interchange with the PA 66 toll road. PA 136 narrows back into a two-lane undivided road and turns northeast through rural residential areas before heading into areas of residential subdivisions, passing through Fort Allen. The road gains a center left-turn lane and passes a few businesses. The route becomes West Newton Road and is two lanes again as it passes more homes, crossing the Southwest Pennsylvania Railroad's Radebaugh Subdivision line. PA 136 continues east through dense residential areas and becomes the border between the city of Greensburg to the north and Hempfield Township to the south. The route becomes a divided highway and ends at an interchange with the US 30 freeway, with West Newton Street continuing east toward downtown Greensburg.

== History ==
PA 31 previously continued west to the West Virginia state line, but in September 1964, the route was truncated twice, with the section between Washington and Greensburg becoming PA 136 while the section from the West Virginia line to Washington became PA 844.

== Major intersections ==
County	Location	mi	km	Destinations	Notes
Washington	Washington	0.000	0.000	West Beau Street to US 40 / PA 18	Continuation beyond western terminus; PA 136 signed to US 40/PA 18
Washington	Washington	0.000	0.000	Main Street	
Washington	Washington	0.137	0.220	US 19 south (College Street)	
Washington	Washington	0.227	0.365	US 19 north (Lincoln Street)	
Washington	South Strabane Township	1.364	2.195	I-70 / I-79 (Raymond P. Shafer Highway) – New Stanton, Morgantown, Wheeling, Pittsburgh	Exit 20 on I-70 / I-79
Washington	Somerset–North Strabane township line	6.501	10.462	PA 519 – Glyde, Canonsburg	
Washington	Fallowfield–Nottingham township line	14.638	23.558	PA 917 south	
Washington	Carroll Township	15.232– 15.249	24.514– 24.541	PA Turnpike 43 (Mon-Fayette Expressway) – California, Pittsburgh	Exit 44 on PA 43; E-ZPass or toll-by-plate
Washington	Monongahela	18.316	29.477	PA 88 north / PA 837 north (Main Street) – New Eagle	Western end of concurrency with PA 88 / PA 837
Washington	Monongahela	19.376	31.183	PA 481 south (Park Avenue)	
Washington	Monongahela	19.534	31.437	PA 837 south (East Main Street) – Donora	Eastern end of concurrency with PA 837
Washington	Monongahela	19.714	31.727	PA 88 south	Eastern end of concurrency with PA 88
Monongahela River		19.754	31.791	Monongahela City Bridge	
Allegheny	Forward Township	22.537	36.270	PA 906 south	
Allegheny	Forward Township	24.484	39.403	PA 51 (Hayden Boulevard)	Interchange
Westmoreland	Rostraver Township	27.680	44.547	PA 201 south (Rostraver Road)	
Westmoreland	South Huntingdon Township	29.752	47.881	PA 31 east (Mt. Pleasant Road) – Mount Pleasant	Western terminus of PA 31
Westmoreland	Hempfield Township	41.323– 41.341	66.503– 66.532	PA Turnpike 66 – New Stanton, Delmont	Exit 4 on PA 66; E-ZPass or toll-by-plate
Westmoreland	Hempfield Township–Greensburg line	44.615	71.801	US 30 (Lincoln Highway) – Latrobe, Pittsburgh	Interchange
Westmoreland	Greensburg	44.702	71.941	South Hamilton Avenue	
Westmoreland	Greensburg	44.702	71.941	West Newton Road	Continuation beyond eastern terminus
1.000 mi = 1.609 km; 1.000 km = 0.621 mi: Concurrency terminus; Electronic toll collection
