= Pennsylvania Route 917 =

State highway in Washington County, Pennsylvania, US

Pennsylvania Route 917

Route information
- Maintained by PennDOT
- Length: 11.15 mi (17.94 km)
- Existed: July 1, 1964–present

Major junctions
- South end: US 40 in North Bethlehem Township
- I-70 in Bentleyville
- North end: PA 136 in Fallowfield Township

Location
- Country: United States
- State: Pennsylvania
- Counties: Washington

Highway system
- Pennsylvania State Route System; Interstate; US; State; Scenic; Legislative
← PA 916	→ PA 918

Pennsylvania Route 917 (PA 917) is a 11.15-mile-long (17.94 km) state highway located in Washington County, Pennsylvania. The southern terminus is at U.S. Route 40 (US 40) in North Bethlehem Township. The northern terminus is at PA 136 in Fallowfield Township.

== Route description ==
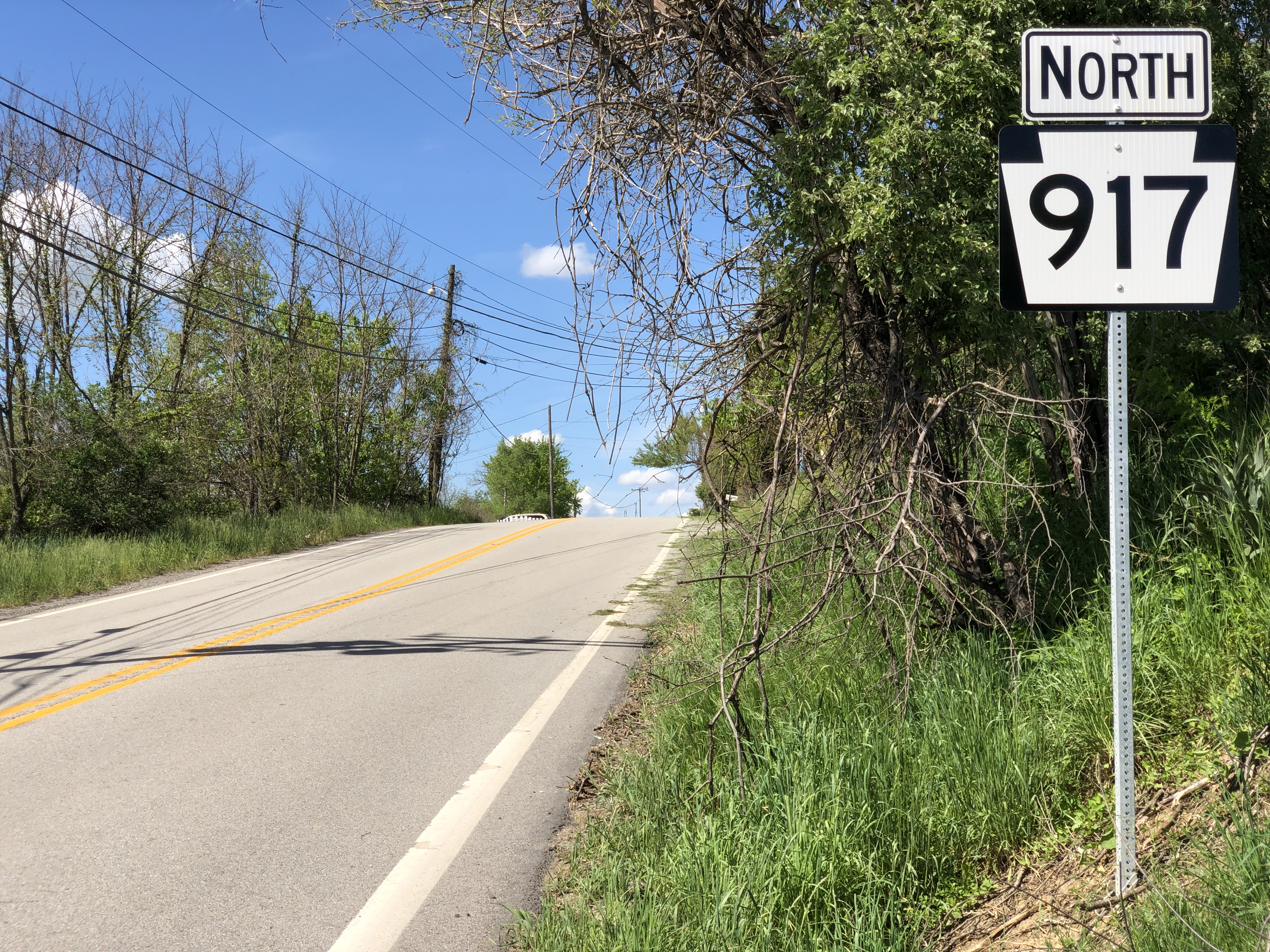
PA 917 northbound past I-70 in Somerset Township

PA 917 begins at an intersection with US 40 in North Bethlehem Township, heading east on two-lane undivided Bull Run Road. The road heads through forests before entering the borough of Cokeburg, where it passes through wooded areas of homes in the southern part of town. Upon leaving Cokeburg, the route heads into Somerset Township and runs through a mix of farmland and woods, passing under a Norfolk Southern railroad line. PA 917 heads into the borough of Ellsworth and becomes South Main Street, making a turn north into areas of homes and businesses. The route progresses north through the town and becomes North Main Street. The road winds east into the borough of Bentleyville, becoming Main Street. PA 917 curves to the north past more development and crosses Norfolk Southern's Ellsworth Secondary line into the commercial downtown. The route forks north onto Pittsburgh Road and passes homes before heading into wooded areas and coming to an interchange with I-70. Past this interchange, the road crosses back into Somerset Township and heads into agricultural areas with some trees and residences. PA 917 turns northeast into more forested surroundings and enters Fallowfield Township, becoming an unnamed road. The route continues north through more woodland with some residences, reaching its northern terminus at PA 136 in Ginger Hill.

== Major intersections ==
The entire route is in Washington County.

Location	mi	km	Destinations	Notes
North Bethlehem Township	0.00	0.00	US 40 (East National Pike)	Southern terminus
Bentleyville	6.28	10.11	I-70 – Washington, Belle Vernon	Exit 32A on I-70
Fallowfield Township	11.15	17.94	PA 136 (Dry Run Road) – Washington, Monongahela	Northern terminus
1.000 mi = 1.609 km; 1.000 km = 0.621 mi
