= Pennsylvania Route 481 =

State highway in Washington County, Pennsylvania, US

Pennsylvania Route 481

Route information
- Maintained by PennDOT
- Length: 12.947 mi (20.836 km)

Major junctions
- South end: US 40 in Centerville
- I-70 near Bentleyville
- North end: PA 88 / PA 136 / PA 837 in Monongahela

Location
- Country: United States
- State: Pennsylvania
- Counties: Washington

Highway system
- Pennsylvania State Route System; Interstate; US; State; Scenic; Legislative
← PA 480	→ PA 482

Pennsylvania Route 481 (PA 481) is a 12.9-mile-long (20.8 km) state highway located in Washington County, Pennsylvania. The southern terminus is at US 40 in Centerville. The northern terminus is at PA 88/PA 136/PA 837 in Monongahela.

== Route description ==
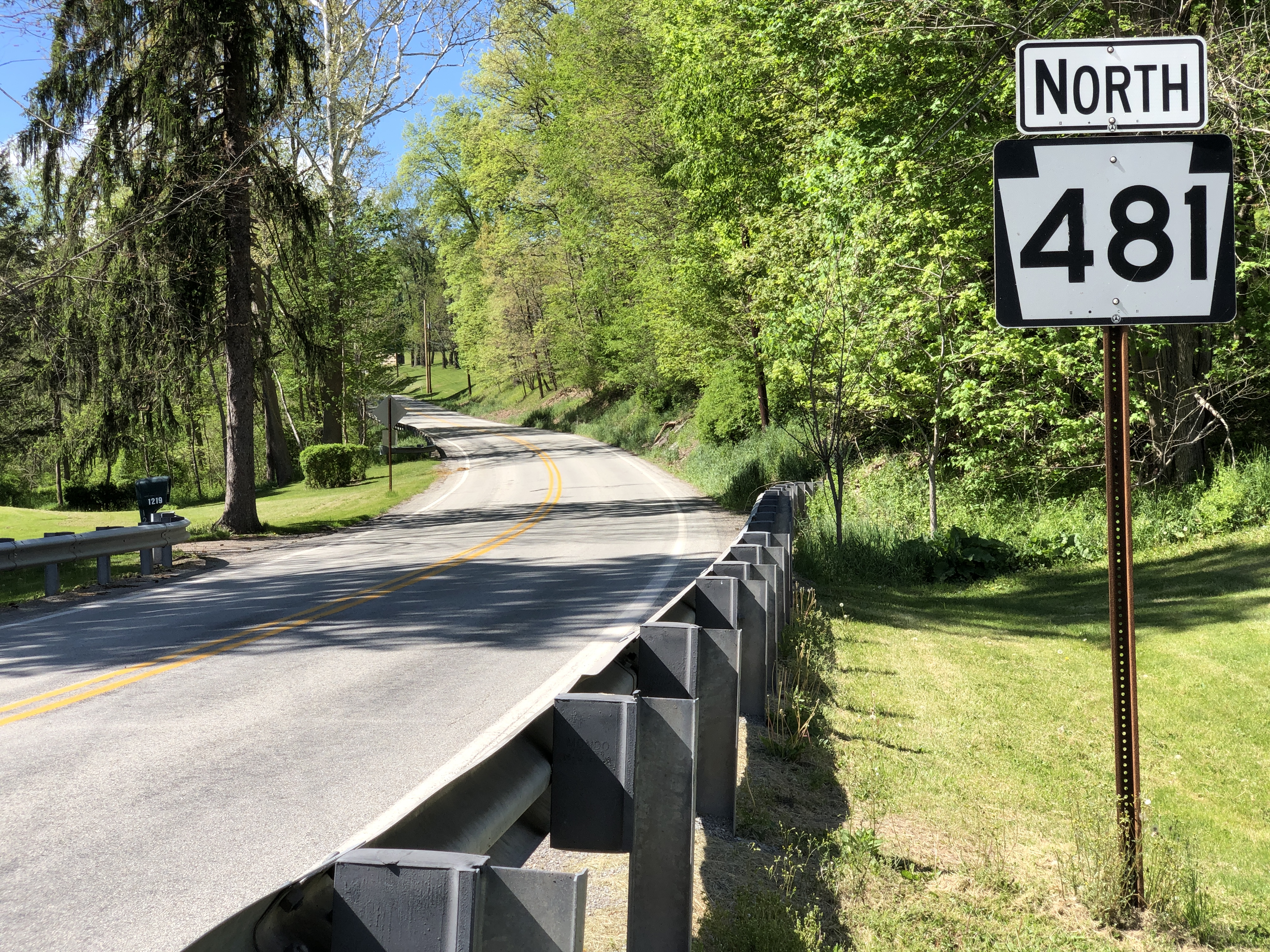
PA 481 northbound in Fallowfield Township

PA 481 begins at an intersection with US 40 in the borough of Centerville, heading northwest on two-lane undivided Old National Pike. The route passes woods to the north and homes to the south, turning north onto Centerville Lane and passing more residences. The road makes a turn east into woods before curving north into a mix of farmland and forests with occasional homes. PA 481 continues north into West Pike Run Township and becomes Scenic Drive, continuing through more rural areas. Farther north, the route comes into Fallowfield Township and passes through Lover, heading northwest before making a turn to the northeast and interchanging with I-70. Past this interchange, the road passes through residential areas along with some fields, becoming an unnamed road. The route passes under a Wheeling and Lake Erie Railway line and passes through open agricultural areas prior to entering a mix of farmland and woodland with some homes. PA 481 turns northeast and enters Carroll Township, running through more rural areas. The road passes under the PA 43 toll freeway and heads into more forested surroundings, crossing Norfolk Southern's Ellsworth Secondary railroad line and making a turn to the east. The route turns north into residential areas before curving northeast and heading into the city of Monongahela on Park Avenue. Here, PA 481 passes more homes before passing businesses and ending at PA 88/PA 136/PA 837.

== Major intersections ==
The entire route is in Washington County.

Location	mi	km	Destinations	Notes
Centerville	0.000	0.000	US 40 (National Pike West) – Brownsville, Beallsville	Southern terminus
Fallowfield Township	6.830	10.992	I-70 – Washington, Belle Vernon	Exit 35 (I-70)
Monongahela	12.947	20.836	PA 88 / PA 136 / PA 837 (Main Street)	Northern terminus
1.000 mi = 1.609 km; 1.000 km = 0.621 mi
