= U.S. Route 40 in Pennsylvania =

Segment of American highway

U.S. Route 40
- National Road
- US 40 highlighted in red and business routes in blue

Route information
- Maintained by PennDOT
- Length: 82.5 mi (132.8 km)
- Tourist routes: Historic National Road

Major junctions
- West end: US 40 near Valley Grove, WV
- I-70 in Washington; US 19 in Washington; I-79 near Washington; PA Turnpike 43 near West Brownsville; US 119 / PA 43 / US 40 Bus. in Uniontown
- East end: US 40 near Grantsville, MD

Location
- Country: United States
- State: Pennsylvania
- Counties: Washington, Fayette, Somerset

Highway system
- United States Numbered Highway System; List; Special; Divided; Pennsylvania State Route System; Interstate; US; State; Scenic; Legislative
← PA 39	→ PA 41
← US 11	PA 11	→ PA 12
← I-81	PA 81	→ I-81E

U.S. Route 40 (US 40) enters Pennsylvania at West Alexander. It closely parallels Interstate 70 (I-70) from West Virginia until it reaches Washington, where it follows Jefferson Avenue and Maiden Street. In Washington, US 40 passes to the south of Washington & Jefferson College. Following Maiden Street out of town, the road turns southeast toward the town of California. A short, limited-access highway in California and West Brownsville provides an approach to the Lane Bane Bridge across the Monongahela River. From here, the road continues southeast to Uniontown.

US 40 bypasses Uniontown along a freeway that also carries US 119. An old alignment through Uniontown is signed as US 40 Business. Southeast of Uniontown, travellers pass the Historic Summit Inn Resort and Fort Necessity National Battlefield. It follows Braddock Road southeast of Uniontown, crossing the Youghiogheny River Lake on a bridge completed in 2006. US 40 leaves Pennsylvania at Addison.

== Route description ==
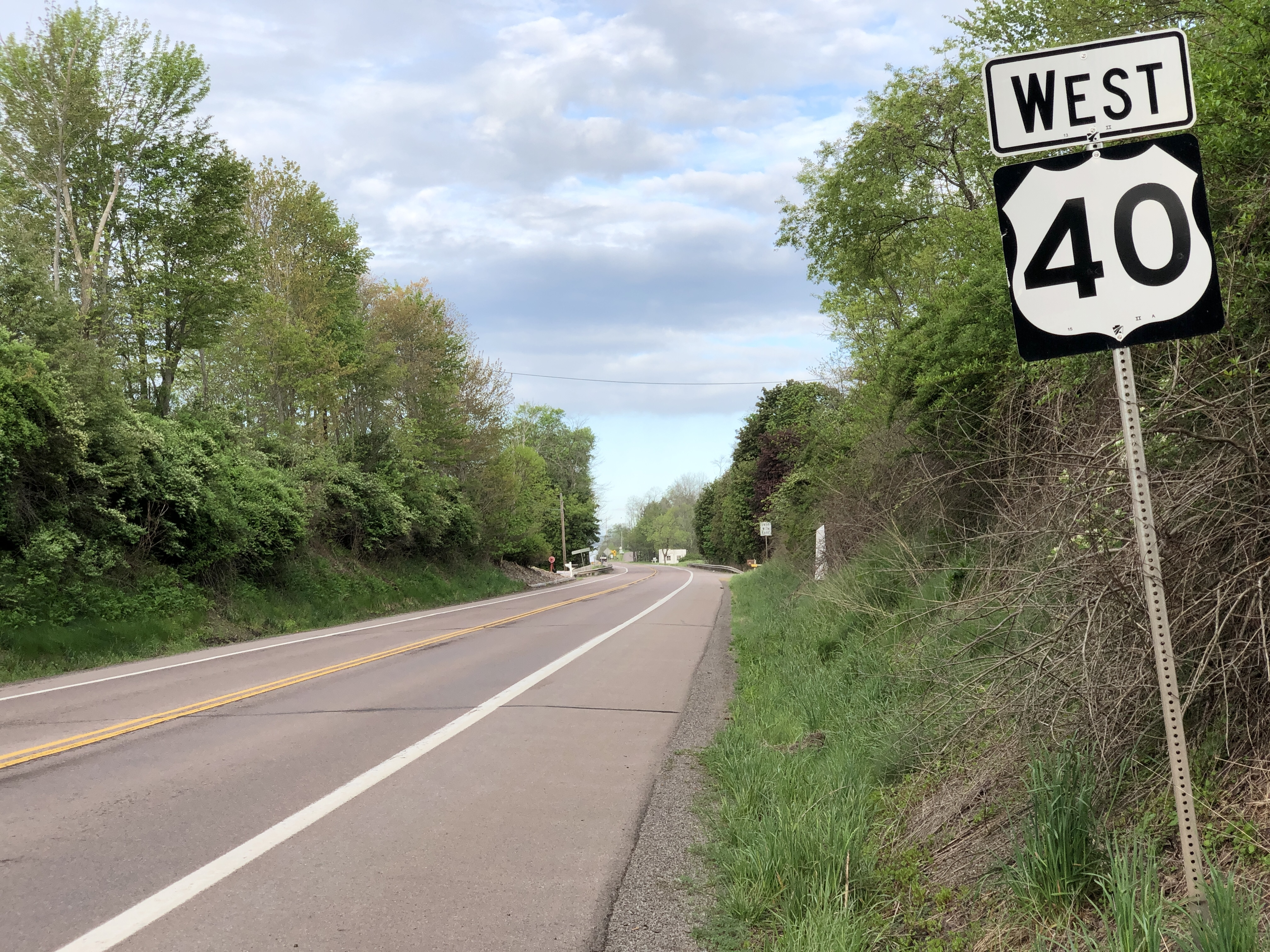
US 40 westbound in Addison Township

U.S. Route 40 enters Pennsylvania in rural western Washington County near West Alexander. It travels to the east-northeast paralleling I-70 through Claysville on to Washington. While in Washington, the largest city on US 40 in Pennsylvania, it is named Chestnut St. Exit 15 on I-70 is signed for Chestnut St. Route 40 leaves Chestnut St. and joins PA 18, becoming Jefferson Ave. After two blocks of concurrency with PA 18, it leaves PA 18 and joins US 19. US 40/US 19 then leaves Washington as Maiden St. US 19 leaves Route 40 in Laboratory before it intersects I-79 at exit 33. Now heading east-southeast, US 40 makes its way toward Brownsville. Route 40 passes through Scenery Hill and Beallsville before reaching PA 43/PA 88 at a full cloverleaf interchange in Centerville. US 40 then crosses the Monongahela River via the Lane Bane Bridge, leaving Washington County after spending nearly 40 miles (64 km) in the county.

US 40 enters Fayette County as Market St. in Brownsville. After leaving Brownsville, Route 40 heads to the southeast toward Uniontown. The highway enters Uniontown as Main St. in front of the Uniontown Mall. When it reaches US 119 it merges with it becoming a bypass of Uniontown. However, US 40 Business passes through downtown Uniontown as the one-way pair of Main St. and Fayette St. US 40 travels around the south of Uniontown and meets again with US 40 Business in Hopwood after leaving US 119. Route 40 then begins a steep ascent up Chestnut Ridge, the westernmost ridge of the Allegheny Mountains before passing the Historic Summit Inn Resort. US 40 becomes a treacherous mountain highway for the next 5 miles (8 KM) featuring steep descents and sharp curves. After passing through Chalk Hill, the National Road passes Fort Necessity National Battlefield and continues to Farmington. On the east side of Farmington, the highway passes Nemacolin Woodlands Resort. Heritage Reservation, a summer residence camp for the Boy Scouts of America is also accessible from this part of US 40, via Dinner Bell Five Forks Road. The National Pike then continues southeast toward the Maryland border after crossing the Youghiogheny River and entering Somerset County. Before leaving Pennsylvania, Route 40 passes through Addison. U.S. Route 40 spends 36.5 miles (58.7 km) in Fayette County and 6.1 miles (9.8 km) in Somerset County, passing through its southwestern corner. It enters Maryland in Garrett County.

== History ==
=== 1789 to 1860 ===
Envisioned by George Washington, US 40, or the National Road was built to connect the East and West. Needed by farmers and emigrants alike, the National Road would provide a stable route for trade through the Allegheny Mountains. The National Road was preceded by buffalo trails, Native American footpaths, and the Nemacolin Trail. After the Revolutionary War, and an increase in migration westward, the newly formed national government realized that communication with the west would be difficult with the Appalachian Mountains separating the east coast from the western frontier. Therefore, the highway was put into Ohio's statehood bill by Albert Gallatin in 1802.

In 1806, Thomas Jefferson authorized the construction of the Cumberland Road—the first federally funded highway in American history. Construction began in 1811 in Cumberland, Maryland and was completed to Wheeling, Virginia (present-day West Virginia) in 1820. In the 1830s, possession of the highway was turned over to the states through which it passes, which allowed states to collect tolls. The Commonwealth of Pennsylvania constructed six tollhouses along its 90–mile–segment of the highway. Two of these still stand: the Petersburg Tollhouse in Addison and the Searights Tollhouse in Fayette County. The Petersburg Tollhouse is the last remaining tollhouse constructed of native-cut stone in the United States. The westernmost toll house near West Alexander, PA has been demolished. Mile markers were also placed along the route. Made of cast-iron, these obelisk markers were placed every one mile and noted the distance to Cumberland and Wheeling and nearby towns. All of these markers are present today, though not all are the originals. Also in the 1830s, the Pony Express utilized the National Road. The 1840s marked the peak of the National Road. Used by many important figures including presidents, future presidents, and other notables, local businesses saw booming success along the road. This time period gave the National Road its nickname of the nation's "Main Street". The navigation of the Monongahela River after the construction of several locks and dams gave the National Road access to Pittsburgh via Brownsville. The Baltimore and Ohio Railroad also arrived in Cumberland in the 1840s. This allowed travel from the east coast to Cumberland via train, from Cumberland to Brownsville via stage coach, and then from Brownsville to Pittsburgh via steamboat. In the 1850s, railroads made it to the west causing the demise of the National Road.

=== 1860 to present ===
In the 1860s, the National Road became insignificant due to the use of the railroads. Many businesses along the route became private homes and the stage coach line went out of business. States relinquished responsibility of the highway to the counties so little or no maintenance was performed on the road. The 1880s brought a small revival to the National Road with the formation of the Good Roads Movement. The invention of the automobile would truly revitalize the highway. Touring along the National Road was popular and many of the businesses returned to offer services to this new type of consumer. The Post Office Appropriation Act of 1912 and the Rural Road Act of 1916 provided funds to rebuild the National Road, and World War I and the overburdened railroads made national highways a priority in the early twentieth century. In 1921, the National Road became U.S. Route 40 after the National Highway Act. The Pennsylvania Route 11 designation was also given to the National Road through Pennsylvania, eventually becoming Pennsylvania Route 81 before the road became solely US 40. The road became very popular again in the 1940s, but this only lasted until the 1950s when the Interstate Highway System was put into place. Today, US 40 has been replaced significantly by Interstate 70 and Interstate 68. US 40 is still used as a local road and scenic route in Pennsylvania, however. US 40 in Pennsylvania has been designated an All American Road (June 13, 2002), a Pennsylvania State Scenic Byway (July 11, 1996), and the Pennsylvania Heritage Corridor (May, 1994).

== Major intersections ==
County	Location	mi	km	Exit	Destinations	Notes
Washington	Donegal Township	0.0	0.0		US 40 west (National Road) – Wheeling	Continuation into West Virginia
Washington	Claysville	6.3	10.1		PA 231 south (Bell Avenue)	Western terminus of PA 231 concurrency
Washington	Claysville	6.5	10.5		PA 231 north (Wayne Street)	Eastern terminus of PA 231 concurrency
Washington	Buffalo Township	10.3	16.6		PA 221 (Green Valley Road/Bridge Road) – Taylorstown, Prosperity	
Washington	North Franklin Township	14.7	23.7		I-70 – New Stanton, Wheeling	Partial cloverleaf interchange; exit 15 (I-70)
Washington	Washington	16.2	26.1		PA 18 north (Jefferson Avenue)	Western terminus of PA 18 concurrency
Washington	Washington	16.4	26.4		PA 136 east (Beau Street)	Western terminus of PA 136
Washington	Washington	16.8	27.0		PA 18 south (Main Street)	Eastern terminus of PA 18 concurrency
Washington	Washington	16.9	27.2		US 19 north (College Street)	Western terminus of US 19 concurrency
Washington	South Strabane Township	18.9	30.4		US 19 south (Waynesburg Road)	Eastern terminus of US 19 concurrency
Washington	Amwell Township	19.4	31.2		I-79 – Washington, Waynesburg	Partial cloverleaf interchange; exit 33 (I-79)
Washington	North Bethlehem Township	23.5	37.8		PA 519 north – Canonsburg	Southern terminus of PA 519
Washington	North Bethlehem Township	27.3	43.9		PA 917 north – Cokeburg, Bentleyville	Southern terminus of PA 917
Washington	Centerville	34.9	56.2		PA 481 north (Old National Pike) – Monongahela	Southern terminus of PA 481
Washington	West Brownsville			Western end of freeway section		
Washington	West Brownsville	37.7	60.7	A-B	PA Turnpike 43 / PA 88 south – Fredericktown, Uniontown, California	Cloverleaf interchange; signed as exits A (south) and B (north); western terminus of PA 88 concurrency
Washington	West Brownsville	39.3	63.2		PA 88 north (Blaine Avenue) – California, West Brownsville	Trumpet interchange; eastern terminus of PA 88 concurrency
Monongahela River				Lane Bane Bridge		
Fayette	Brownsville				Brownsville	Access via Market Street
Fayette	Brownsville			Eastern end of freeway section		
Fayette	Brownsville Township				PA 166 south (Thornton Road) to US 40 Bus. – Republic, SCI Fayette	Northern terminus of PA 166
Fayette	Redstone Township				PA Turnpike 43 – Uniontown, Pittsburgh	Diamond interchange; E-ZPass or toll-by-plate; alternative route to Uniontown
Fayette	Redstone Township				US 40 Bus. west (National Pike) – Brownsville	Eastern terminus of US 40 Bus.
Fayette	Uniontown	51.3	82.6		US 40 Bus. east (Main Street)	Western terminus of US 40 Bus.
Fayette	Uniontown	51.3	82.6	Western end of freeway section		
Fayette	Uniontown	51.3	82.6		US 119 north / PA 43 north – Connellsville	Western terminus of US 119/PA 43 concurrency; diamond interchange
Fayette	South Union Township	52.0	83.7		PA 21 (McClellandtown Road)	Trumpet interchange
Fayette	South Union Township				Walnut Hill Road	Diamond interchange
Fayette	South Union Township	54.2	87.2		US 119 south / PA 43 south – Morgantown	No westbound exit; eastern terminus of US 119/PA 43 concurrency
Fayette	South Union Township				Morgantown Road to US 119 south / PA 43 south	Westbound exit only
Fayette	South Union Township	56.9	91.6		US 40 Bus. (National Pike) – Hopwood, Uniontown	Eastern terminus of US 40 Bus.
Fayette	South Union Township			Eastern end of freeway section		
Fayette	Wharton Township	65.8	105.9		PA 381 (Elliotsville Road) – Elliotsville, Ohiopyle	
Fayette	Henry Clay Township	73.3	118.0		PA 281 south – Morgantown	Western terminus of PA 281 concurrency
Fayette	Henry Clay Township	73.5	118.3		PA 281 north (Mae West Road) – Youghiogheny River Lake, Confluence	Eastern terminus of PA 281 concurrency
Somerset	Addison	80.5	129.6		PA 523 north (Listonburg Road) – Confluence, Somerset	Southern terminus of PA 523
Somerset	Addison Township	82.3	132.4		US 40 east (National Pike) – Cumberland	Continuation into Maryland
1.000 mi = 1.609 km; 1.000 km = 0.621 mi: Concurrency terminus; Electronic toll collection; Incomplete access

== See also ==
U.S. Route 40
Previous state: West Virginia	Pennsylvania	Next state: Maryland
