= Monongahela City Bridge =

- Coordinates: 40.1992°N 79.9162°W
- Carries: 2 lanes of PA 136 / BicyclePA Route S
- Crosses: Monongahela River
- Locale: Monongahela, Pennsylvania and Forward Township, Pennsylvania
- Official name: General Carl E. Vuono Bridge

Characteristics
- Design: Girder bridge
- Longest span: 440.0 feet (134.1 m)

History
- Opened: 1990

Location
- Interactive map of Monongahela City Bridge

The Monongahela City Bridge, officially known as the General Carl E. Vuono Bridge, spans the Monongahela River from the City of Monongahela in Washington County, Pennsylvania to Forward Township in Allegheny County, Pennsylvania. It was built to replace a bridge that was situated one-quarter of a mile north of the current bridge's location at First and Main Streets.

== History and notable features ==
Opened to traffic in 1990, this bridge marks the end of Monongahela's Main Street and the separation of Pennsylvania Route 136 from Pennsylvania Route 88. This is the fourth bridge to cross this segment of the river.

The 1836 Williamsport Bridge was a wooden structure that served Monongahela while the town was operating under its original name. After this bridge was consumed in a fire, a four-frame truss bridge was constructed in 1884. This was soon replaced by a three-frame bridge in 1910, which stood until the erection of the current structure in 1990.
