= Pennsylvania Route 88 =

State highway in Pennsylvania, US

Pennsylvania Route 88

Route information
- Maintained by PennDOT
- Length: 68.244 mi (109.828 km)

Major junctions
- South end: US 119 in Point Marion
- US 40 / PA Turnpike 43 near West Brownsville; I-70 in Speers
- North end: PA 51 / Blue Belt in Pittsburgh

Location
- Country: United States
- State: Pennsylvania
- Counties: Fayette, Greene, Washington, Allegheny

Highway system
- Pennsylvania State Route System; Interstate; US; State; Scenic; Legislative
← PA 87	→ PA 89

Pennsylvania Route 88 (PA 88) is a 68-mile-long (109 km) north–south state highway located in southwestern Pennsylvania. The southern terminus of the route is at U.S. Route 119 (US 119) in Point Marion less than 2 miles (3 km) from the Pennsylvania-West Virginia border. The northern terminus is at PA 51 in Pittsburgh. PA 88 runs parallel to the Monongahela River for almost its entire length.

Signed in 1927, PA 88 is one of the oldest state highways in Pennsylvania. For a brief period between 1927 and 1928, the route followed the Perry Highway between Pittsburgh and Erie. In 1928, the Perry Highway became US 19.

== Route description ==
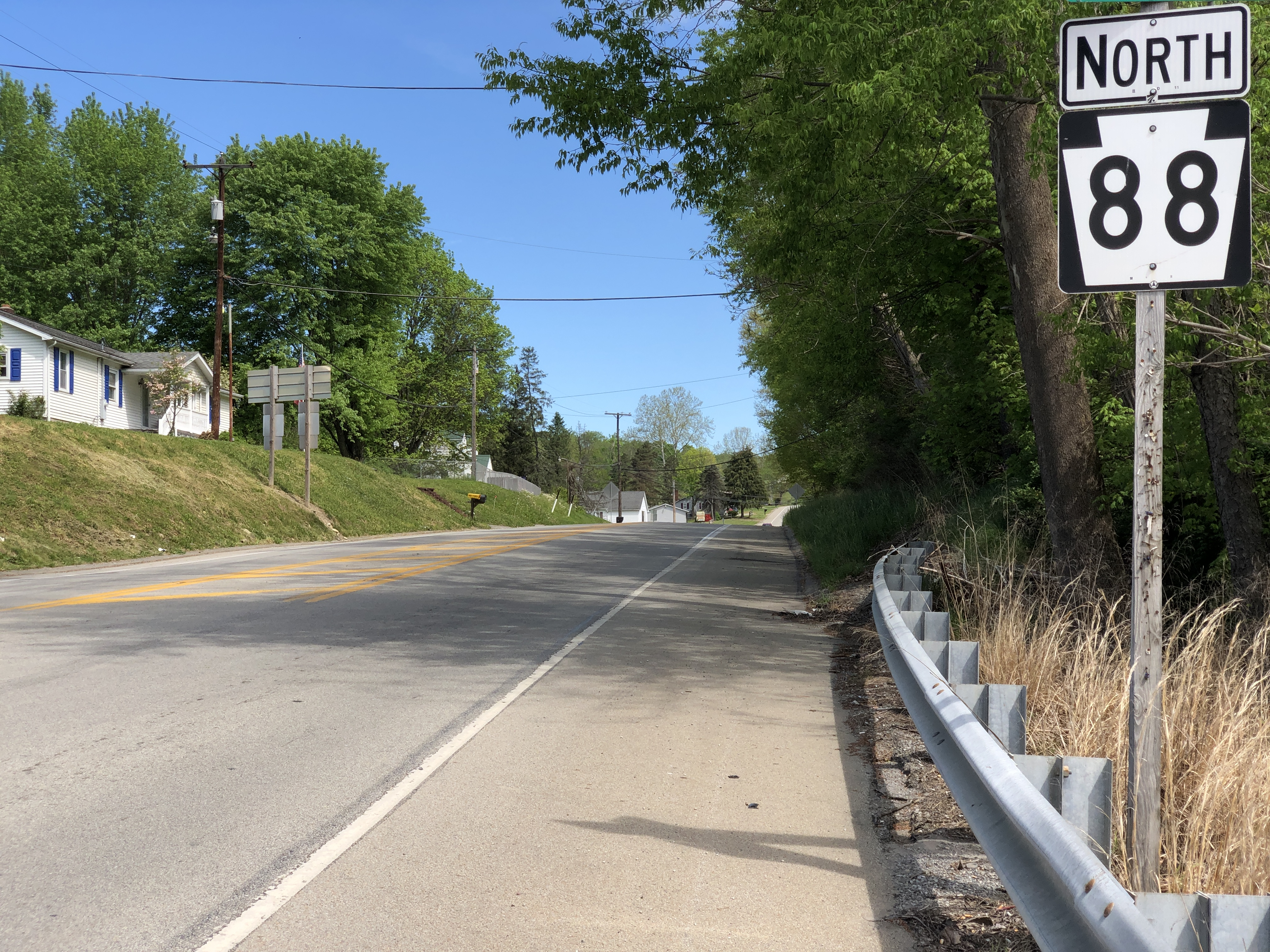
PA 88 northbound past PA 21 in Cumberland Township

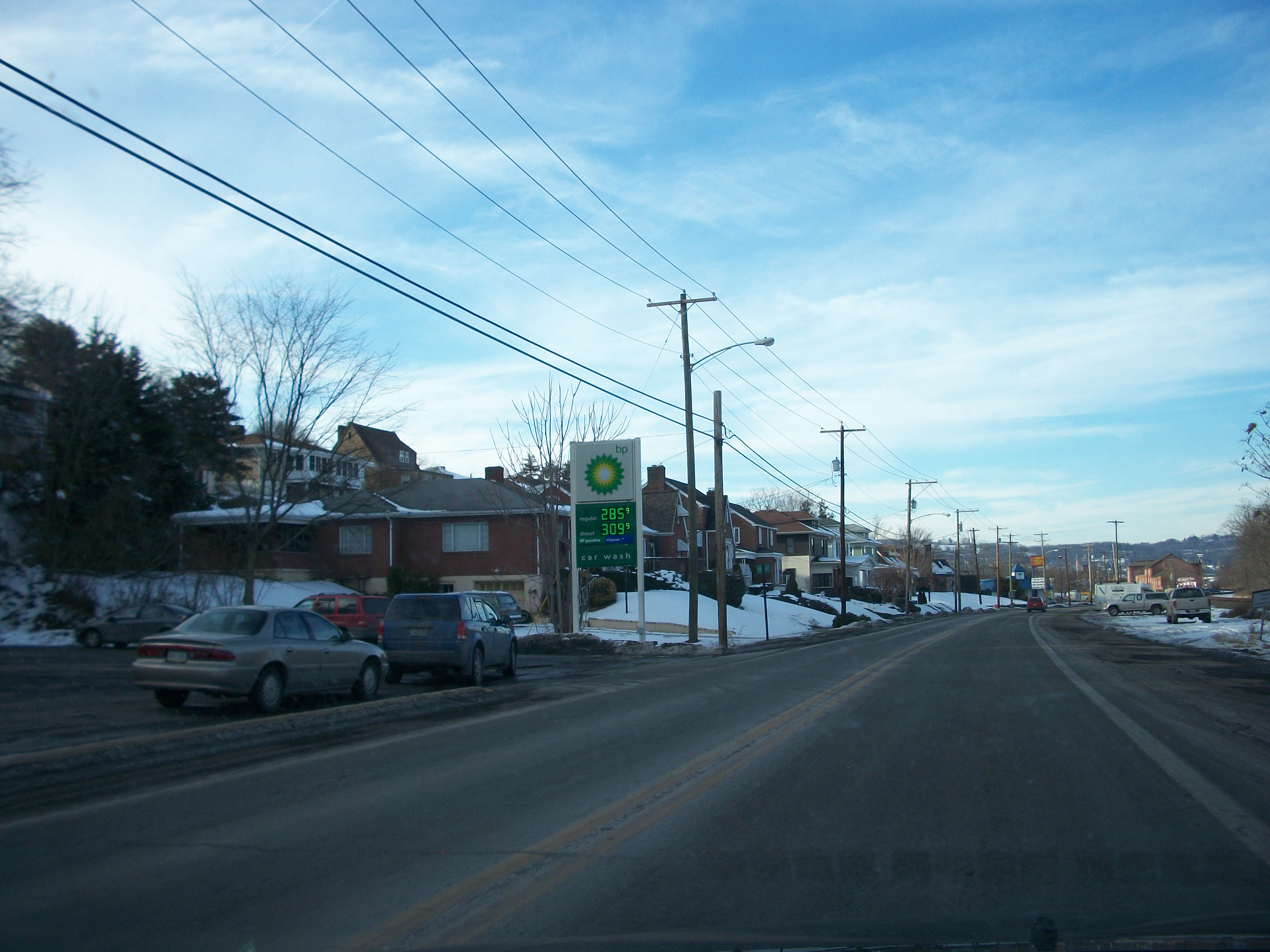
PA 88 in Speers

PA 88 begins in Point Marion at an intersection with US 119. PA 88 begins as Main Street then turns to the west crossing the Monongahela River into Greene County on the Albert Gallatin Memorial Bridge. After crossing the river, PA 88 turns to the north as it begins to parallel the Monongahela River to the east as well as railroad tracks to the west. After crossing the Dunkard Creek, PA 88 has entered the village of Poland Mines. In Monongahela Township, PA 88 intersects Pennsylvania Route 21. In the boro of Carmichaels, PA 88 is called Vine Street and crosses Muddy Creek. In Jefferson Township, PA 88 intersects the eastern terminus of Pennsylvania Route 188 southwest of Rices Landing.

After crossing the Tenmile Creek, PA 88 has entered Washington County as Front Street. PA 88 passes through the following villages: Milfred Terrace, Fredericktown Hill, North Fredericktown, Vesta Heights, and Vestaburg. In East Bethlehem Township and Centerville Boro. In Centerville Boro, PA 88 becomes Low Hill Rd. PA 88 has a snake like curve paralleling the Monongahela River. In Centerville Boro, PA 88 joins Pennsylvania Turnpike 43 for 2 miles (3.2 km) before leaving to join another concurrency with U.S. Route 40. East of PA 43, PA 88 leaves US 40 at a trumpet interchange in West Brownsville. North of the concurrency, PA 88 becomes a local road named California Road. In California, PA 88 becomes Wood Street then turns to the west and becomes 3rd Street. In Coal Center, PA 88 Highpoint Drive, then Spring Street, and then Highpoint Drive again. Passengers can see Turnpike 43 from PA 88 in Coal Center. As PA 88 begins to shift to the east, it enters the following boros: Elco, Roscoe, and Stockdale. As PA 88 enters these boros it becomes Highpoint Drive and Chester Avenue. North of Stockdale, PA 88 begins to turn to the north and becomes Main Street. In Speers as Pennsylvania Street, PA 88 interchanges Interstate 70 at exit 40 in a scaped shaped interchange with long ramps. In Charleroi and North Charleroi, PA 88 is called McKean Avenue. In Carroll Township, PA 88 is called Country Club Road and meets the southern terminus of Pennsylvania Route 837. In Monongahela, PA 88 begins a three route concurrency with Pennsylvania Route 136 and PA 837. Then PA 88/PA 136/PA 837 become Main Street and intersect the northern terminus of Pennsylvania Route 481. In the northern tip of Monongahela, PA 136 splits off from PA 88 and PA 837. As PA 88/PA 837 enter New Eagle, PA 837 splits from PA 88 then PA 88 becomes Union Street. In Union Township, PA 88 passes under Turnpike 43. In Finleyville, PA 88 becomes Sheridan Avenue. Finleyville is where the future Interstate 576 (Southern Beltway) will meet Turnpike 43. Then PA 88 re-enters Union Township passing several businesses and then becomes Library Road near the Allegheny County line.

The entire 8.5-mile (13.7 km) Allegheny County stretch of PA 88 is also designated as Library Road. Starting at the Washington/Allegheny County line where PA 88 becomes Library Road, PA 88 runs through South Park, Bethel Park, Castle Shannon, and the Overbrook neighborhood of Pittsburgh where PA 88/Library Rd. ends at an "Y" intersection with Pennsylvania Route 51/Saw Mill Run Blvd. Three of the six county's colored Belt Routes connect with and/or run along PA 88 (see below).

== History ==
PA 88 originally was planned to extend from Pittsburgh all the way north to Erie, along the highway that now largely follows US 19. US 19 was first proposed for this route in 1927, but the routing at the time was turned down. The route does appear as both PA 88 and US 19 on one 1928 map.

In the 1930s (most likely 1935 or 1936) PA 88 was extended north to New Castle. The route is not marked as PA 88 on the official 1930 map but is so marked on the 1940 map. The Pittsburgh-to-New Castle section was largely split off on July 15, 1960 to form Pennsylvania Route 65, in honor of the 65th Infantry Division of the United States Army during World War II. The 7.7 mile stretch of PA 88 from PA 65's current southern terminus at the West End Bridge to PA 88's current northern terminus was decommissioned. This designation change was made to reduce the number of concurrent routes in Pittsburgh. The changes took effect a few months later and signs were changed by spring 1961.

=== Connections to PA 65 ===
Nonetheless, PA 88's legacy still survives in its former northern sections. Of PA 88's five spur routes, PA 288 and PA 488 were branch routes off what is now US 19, while PA 288, PA 388, PA 488, and PA 588 now appear as spur routes of 65, but still retain the "88" base numbers. (PA 88 did retain PA 188 as a spur route.) In addition, a drive-in theater known as Spotlight 88 in North Sewickley Township retained its name after the route was rebadged as 65, and is still known by that name as its current incarnation as a flea market after the drive-in was destroyed by an F3 tornado on May 31, 1985.

== Major intersections ==
County	Location	mi	km	Destinations	Notes
Fayette	Point Marion	0.000	0.000	US 119 (Penn Street / North Main Street) – Morgantown	Southern terminus of PA 88
Monongahela River		0.149– 0.291	0.240– 0.468	Point Marion Bridge	
Greene	Monongahela Township	11.023	17.740	PA 21 (Roy E. Furman Highway) – Waynesburg, Masontown	
Greene	Jefferson Township	17.682	28.456	PA 188 west (Jefferson Road) / SR 1008 (Ferncliff Road) – Waynesburg, Rices Landing, Crucible	Eastern terminus of PA 188
Washington	Centerville	27.316	43.961	PA Turnpike 43 south / SR 2029 (Low Hill Road) – Uniontown, West Brownsville	Exit 28 (PA 43); southern terminus of PA 43 concurrency; E-ZPass or toll-by-plate on PA 43
Washington	Centerville	29.216	47.019	US 40 west / PA Turnpike 43 north – Centerville, Washington, California	Exits 30A–B (PA 43); northern terminus of PA 43 concurrency; southern terminus of US 40 concurrency
Washington	West Brownsville	30.690	49.391	US 40 east – Uniontown	Interchange; northern terminus of US 40 concurrency
Washington	California	33.172	53.385	PA 88 Truck north (Malden Road) to I-70 / PA Turnpike 43 / Skyline Drive	Southern terminus of Truck PA 88
Washington	California	34.439	55.424	PA 88 Truck south (3rd Street Extension) to PA Turnpike 43	Northern terminus of Truck PA 88
Washington	Speers	42.234– 42.840	67.969– 68.944	I-70 – Washington, Belle Vernon, New Stanton	Exit 40 (I-70)
Washington	Carroll Township	46.974	75.597	PA 837 north – Donora, Monessen	Southern terminus of PA 837
Washington	Monongahela	48.780	78.504	PA 136 east (Monongahela City Bridge)	Southern terminus of PA 136 concurrency
Washington	Monongahela	48.853	78.621	PA 837 south (East Main Street) – Donora	Southern terminus of PA 837 concurrency
Washington	Monongahela	49.121	79.053	PA 481 south (Park Avenue)	Northern terminus of PA 481
Washington	Monongahela	50.194	80.779	PA 136 west (Dry Run Road) to PA Turnpike 43 – Eighty Four	Northern terminus of PA 136 concurrency
Washington	New Eagle	51.164	82.340	PA 837 north (5th Street) – Elizabeth	Northern terminus of PA 837 concurrency
Allegheny	Bethel Park	60.573	97.483	Orange Belt begins (Clifton Road / SR 3004) – Upper Saint Clair, Pittsburgh International Airport	Southwestern terminus of Orange Belt
Allegheny	Bethel Park	64.513	103.824	Yellow Belt (Broughton Road / SR 2040) / Bethel Church Road	Southern terminus of Yellow Belt concurrency
Allegheny	Castle Shannon	65.485	105.388	Yellow Belt (Connor Road / SR 3038) to US 19 – Mount Lebanon, Bridgeville	Northern terminus of Yellow Belt concurrency
Allegheny	Pittsburgh	67.716	108.978	Blue Belt (McNeilly Road)	Southern terminus of Blue Belt concurrency
Allegheny	Pittsburgh	68.244	109.828	PA 51 / Blue Belt (Saw Mill Run Boulevard) – Downtown, Uniontown	Northern terminus of PA 88; northern terminus of concurrency with the Blue Belt
1.000 mi = 1.609 km; 1.000 km = 0.621 mi: Concurrency terminus

== PA 88 Truck ==
Pennsylvania Route 88 Truck
- Location: California, Pennsylvania
- Existed: 1990–present

Pennsylvania Route 88 Truck is a 2-mile-long (3.2 km) truck route in California, Pennsylvania. The route was created to allow access to the Pennsylvania Route 43 toll freeway and to allow large vehicles to avoid the large hill into the Monongahela Valley. The center of the route is at the PA 43 interchange, with a two-lane stretch providing access to California University of Pennsylvania and the surrounding business district, as well as connecting traffic with northbound Route 88; a four-lane stretch provides a more gradual ascent of the hill on Route 88 southbound.
