= Pennsylvania Route 837 =

State highway in Washington and Allegheny counties in Pennsylvania, US

Pennsylvania Route 837

Route information
- Maintained by PennDOT
- Length: 40.3 mi (64.9 km)
- Existed: May 27, 1935–present

Major junctions
- South end: PA 88 in Carroll Township
- I-376 in Pittsburgh
- North end: US 19 / PA 51 / PA 60 in Pittsburgh

Location
- Country: United States
- State: Pennsylvania
- Counties: Washington, Allegheny

Highway system
- Pennsylvania State Route System; Interstate; US; State; Scenic; Legislative
← PA 836	→ PA 838

Pennsylvania Route 837 (PA 837) is a state route located in western Pennsylvania. The southern terminus of the route is at Pennsylvania Route 88 in the Carroll Township hamlet of Wickerham Manor. The northern terminus is at U.S. Route 19 (US 19) and PA 51 near downtown Pittsburgh at the junction of the Ohio, Allegheny and Monongahela rivers. The highway parallels the Monongahela River for all of its route with the exceptions of its extreme north and south ends. Popular amusement park Kennywood is located along this route.

== Route description ==
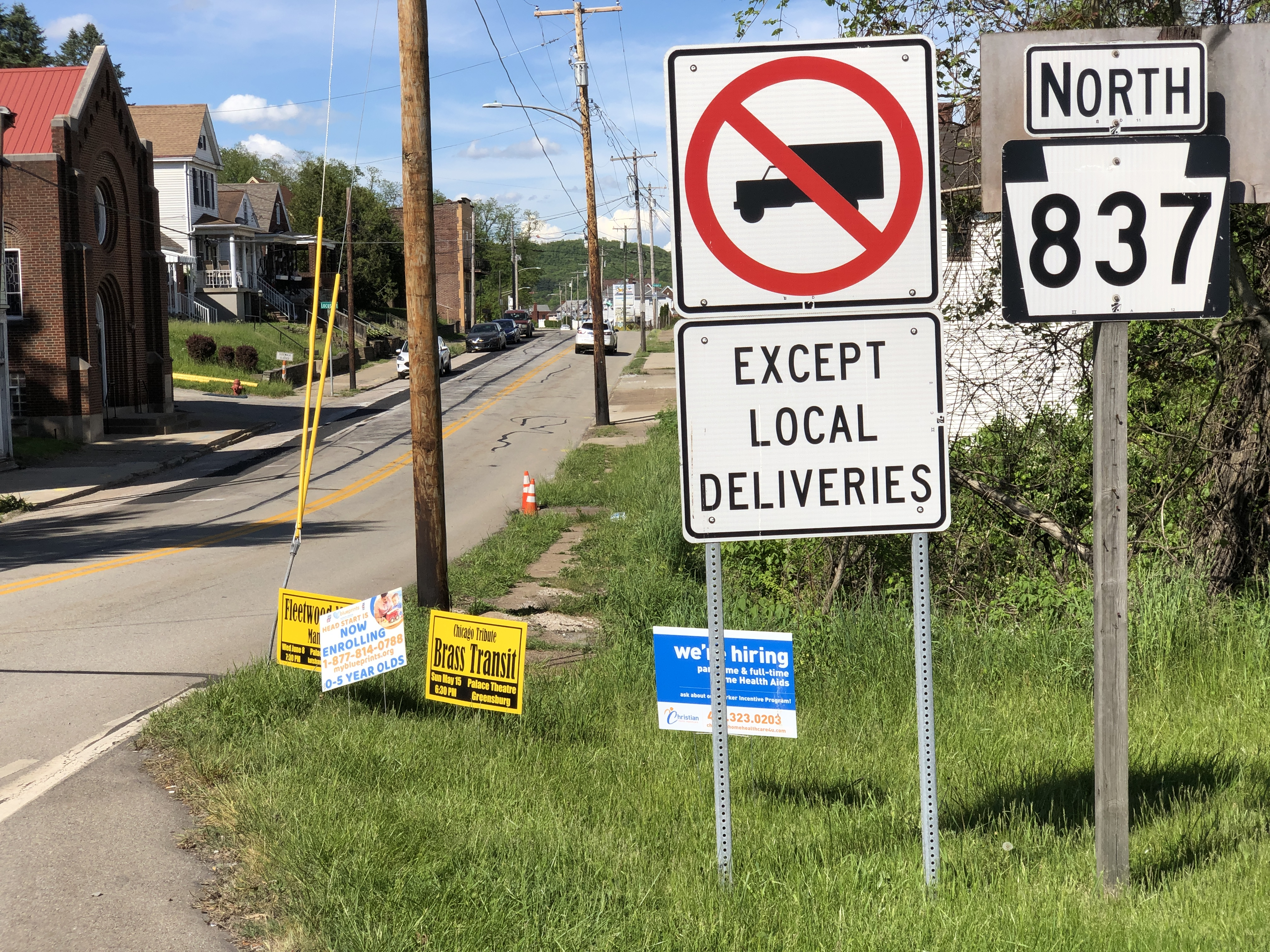
PA 837 northbound in Donora

=== Washington County ===
PA 837 begins at PA 88 in Carroll Township. It actually starts toward the east-southeast toward the borough of Donora. Before entering Donora, it turns to the north and passes the Monessen Bridge and becomes S. McKean Avenue. It leaves Donora as Meldon Avenue after passing the former site of the Donora-Webster Bridge at 10th Street.

After turning west, PA 837 enters the city of Monongahela where it meets PA 88 again. It joins PA 88 for 2.5 miles (4.0 km) through Monongahela and the borough of New Eagle. After rounding another bend in the Monongahela River, PA 837 heads for the borough of West Elizabeth. Sixteen miles of PA 837 is in Washington County.

=== Allegheny County ===
In West Elizabeth PA 837 is known as 5th Street (alternately, the Charles McDevitt Memorial Highway, after the former Mayor of that town) before it intersects PA 51 at the Elizabeth Bridge and turns back to the northwest toward the city of Clairton. In Clairton, PA 837 is known as State Street and passes Clairton Coke Works, a large coke manufacturer. Paralleling the Monongahela River, winds through the borough of Dravosburg and the city of Duquesne. Upon leaving Duquesne, Route 837 becomes Kennywood Blvd. as it passes Kennywood Park, a well-known amusement park in western Pennsylvania.

Shortly after passing Kennywood, PA 837 becomes 8th Avenue in the borough of Homestead. In Homestead, the highway passes The Waterfront, a large shopping center on the banks of the Monongahela. West of Homestead, PA 837 encounters a complex interchange with PA 885, Baldwin Rd., and Glass Run Rd.

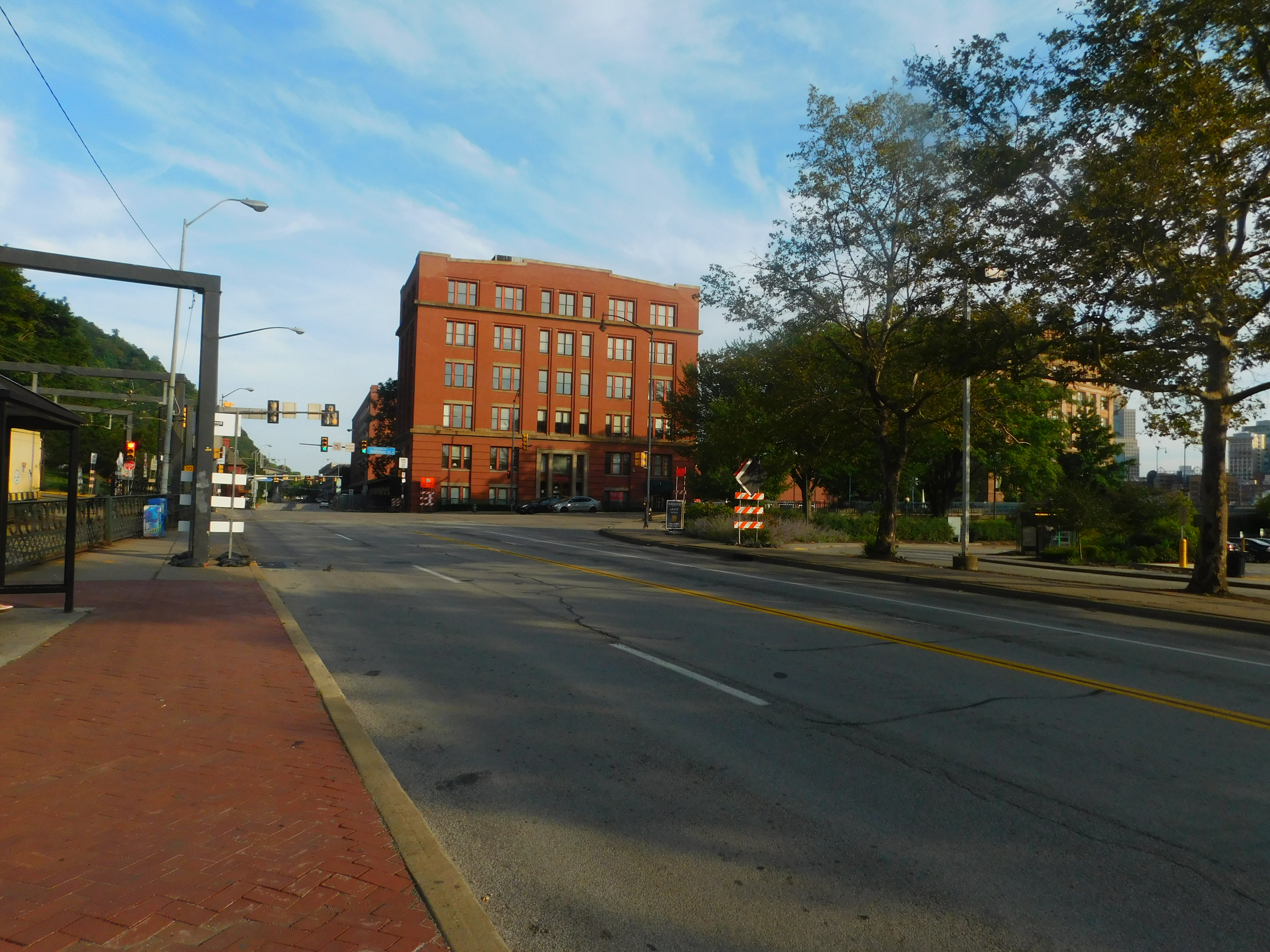
PA 837 at Station Square

PA 837 becomes East Carson Street in the South Side Flats neighborhood of the city of Pittsburgh. East Carson Street is the main road of a major business district in the South Side. Carson Street then passes Station Square before travelling under the Fort Pitt Bridge and ending at the West End Circle.

PA 837 spends almost 25 miles (40 km) in Allegheny County. It is the south end of five bridges in Pittsburgh and passes under two others.

=== Allegheny County Belt routes ===
Two of Allegheny County's colored belt routes align PA 837:

- Blue Belt (3.5 miles) from Becks Run Road in Baldwin to Homestead Grays Bridge in Homestead
- Green Belt (4 miles) from Rankin Bridge in Whitaker to McKeesport/Duquesne Bridge in Duquesne

A portion of the Orange Belt that was decommissioned in the 1970s also ran along PA 837 for 2.5 miles from the Regis Malady Bridge in Elizabeth to Finleyville-Elrama Road in Elrama

== Major intersections ==
County	Location	mi	km	Destinations	Notes
Washington	Carroll Township	0.0	0.0	PA 88 (Country Club Road) – Charleroi, Monongahela	Southern terminus of PA 837
Washington	Donora			Donora-Monessen Bridge to I-70 / PA 906 – Monessen	Interchange
Washington	Monongahela	8.5	13.7	PA 88 south / PA 136 east – Charleroi	Southern terminus of PA 88 / PA 136 concurrency
Washington	Monongahela	8.7	14.0	PA 481 south (Park Avenue) / First Street	Northern terminus of PA 481
Washington	Monongahela	9.7	15.6	PA 136 west (Dry Run Road) to PA Turnpike 43 – Eighty Four	Northern terminus of PA 136 concurrency
Washington	New Eagle	10.9	17.5	PA 88 north (Union Street) – Finleyville	Northern terminus of PA 88 concurrency
Allegheny	West Elizabeth	17.8	28.6	PA 51 – Pittsburgh, Elizabeth	Interchange
Allegheny	Clairton	20.8	33.5	PA 885 north (Walnut Avenue)	Southern terminus of PA 885
Allegheny	Duquesne	26.4	42.5	Green Belt (McKeesport-Duquesne Bridge) to PA 148 – McKeesport	Interchange, southern terminus of Green Belt concurrency
Allegheny	Whitaker	31.8	51.2	Green Belt (Rankin Bridge) to I-376 – Swissvale	Southwest end of bridge, northern terminus of Green Belt concurrency
Allegheny	Homestead	32.1	51.7	Blue Belt (Homestead Grays Bridge) / West Street	Southeast end of bridge, eastern terminus of Blue Belt concurrency
Allegheny	Pittsburgh	33.6	54.1	PA 885 (Glenwood Bridge/Mifflin Road) / Glass Run Road	Interchange
Allegheny	Pittsburgh	35.4	57.0	Blue Belt (Becks Run Road) – Carrick	Western terminus of Blue Belt concurrency
Allegheny	Pittsburgh	36.6	58.9	Hot Metal Street	
Allegheny	Pittsburgh	37.1	59.7	Birmingham Bridge – Oakland	South end of Birmingham Bridge
Allegheny	Pittsburgh	37.9	61.0	S. Tenth Street – Downtown	South end of South Tenth Street Bridge
Allegheny	Pittsburgh	38.8	62.4	Smithfield Street Bridge – Downtown	South end of Smithfield Street Bridge
Allegheny	Pittsburgh	39.8	64.1	I-376 east (US 22 east / US 30 east/Penn-Lincoln Parkway/Fort Pitt Bridge) to I-279 north	Exit 69C (I-376); access only from PA 837 south to I-376 east / I-376 west to PA 837 north
Allegheny	Pittsburgh	40.3	64.9	US 19 / PA 51 (West End Bridge) – McKees Rocks, West End, Airport PA 60 north (South Main Street) – Crafton	Northern terminus of PA 837, southern terminus of PA 60
1.000 mi = 1.609 km; 1.000 km = 0.621 mi: Concurrency terminus; Incomplete access

== PA 837 Truck ==
Pennsylvania Route 837 Truck
- Location: West Elizabeth, Pennsylvania
- Existed: 2007–present

Pennsylvania Route 837 Truck is a truck route of PA 837 signed in 2007.

The route was established for trucks coming onto PA 837 from PA 51 south. It first utilizes the exit ramps from PA 837 to PA 51 south. It follows PA 51 south to an interchange at Ridge Road. It turns left on Ridge Road and makes a U-Turn back onto PA 51 north. It then utilizes the PA 51 exit ramps to PA 837.
