= Darragh, Pennsylvania =

Unincorporated community in Pennsylvania, US

- Unincorporated community
- Location within Pennsylvania
- Coordinates: 40°15′59″N 79°40′43″W
- Country: United States
- State: Pennsylvania
- County: Westmoreland
- Elevation: 978 ft (298 m)
- Time zone: UTC-5 (Eastern (EST))
  - Summer (DST): UTC-4 (EDT)
- ZIP code: 15625
- Area code: 724
- GNIS feature ID: 1172961

Darragh is an unincorporated community in Hempfield Township, Westmoreland County, Pennsylvania, United States. Originally a coal town, the community is located along Pennsylvania Route 136, 1 mile (1.6 km) west of Arona. Darragh has a post office, with ZIP code 15625, which opened on July 21, 1892.

== History ==
The Madison Coal Gas Company of Greensburg, Pennsylvania established Darragh in 1890 to support the nearby Madison coal mine. Darragh eventually became the center of operations for the Keystone Coal and Coke Company's operations in the area of Little Sewickley Creek. These included the Madison, Arona, Sewickley and Keystone Shaft mines, which employed about 1,000 people. Darragh's population peaked near the end of the First World War, when the four Keystone mines reached their highest production levels. By 1925, the Madison, Arona and Sewickley mines had ceased operations.

The Keystone Shaft mine closed in the mid-1930s. By 1938, Keystone Coal and Coke had withdrawn from Darragh.
