= Hazel Kirk, Pennsylvania =

Unincorporated community in Pennsylvania, US

Hazel Kirk
- Unincorporated community
- Location within the state of Pennsylvania Hazel Kirk (the United States)
- Coordinates: 40°10′29″N 79°57′34″W
- Country: United States
- State: Pennsylvania
- County: Washington
- Elevation: 791 ft (241 m)
- Time zone: UTC-5 (Eastern (EST))
  - Summer (DST): UTC-4 (EDT)
- ZIP codes: 15366
- GNIS feature ID: 1176711

Hazel Kirk is an unincorporated community and coal town located in Washington County, in the southwestern corner of the U.S. state of Pennsylvania. Hazel Kirk was part of Carroll Township and was the location of four bituminous coal mines, known as "Hazel Kirk Mine," "Hazel Kirk No. 1," "Hazel Kirk No. 2," and "Hazel Kirk No. 3."

== 1905 Hazel Kirk No. 2 disaster ==
Hazel Kirk Mine No. 2, owned by the Pittsburg and Westmoreland Coal Company, was the site of two fatal explosions in October 1905. On October 10, 1905 the first underground explosion, related to a dynamite blast, killed two miners, the brothers John and Mike Kusko. A fire resulted; temporary bulkheads were erected to isolate the flames and the burning section of the mine was flooded with water.

After nearly three weeks the fire was believed to have burned itself out. The 45-year-old superintendent of Hazel Kirk No. 2, John Hornickel and five other managers of the facility reentered the mine near midnight on the night of October 28–29 to investigate the situation. All work was stopped and workers were removed from the mines during the investigation. A temporary partition was removed by the investigators during the course of their inspection, behind which explosive gas had been trapped. An explosion resulted, killing five and seriously burning the sixth mine official.
