= David Longwell House =

Historic house in Pennsylvania, United States

- U.S. National Register of Historic Places
- Washington County History & Landmarks Foundation Landmark
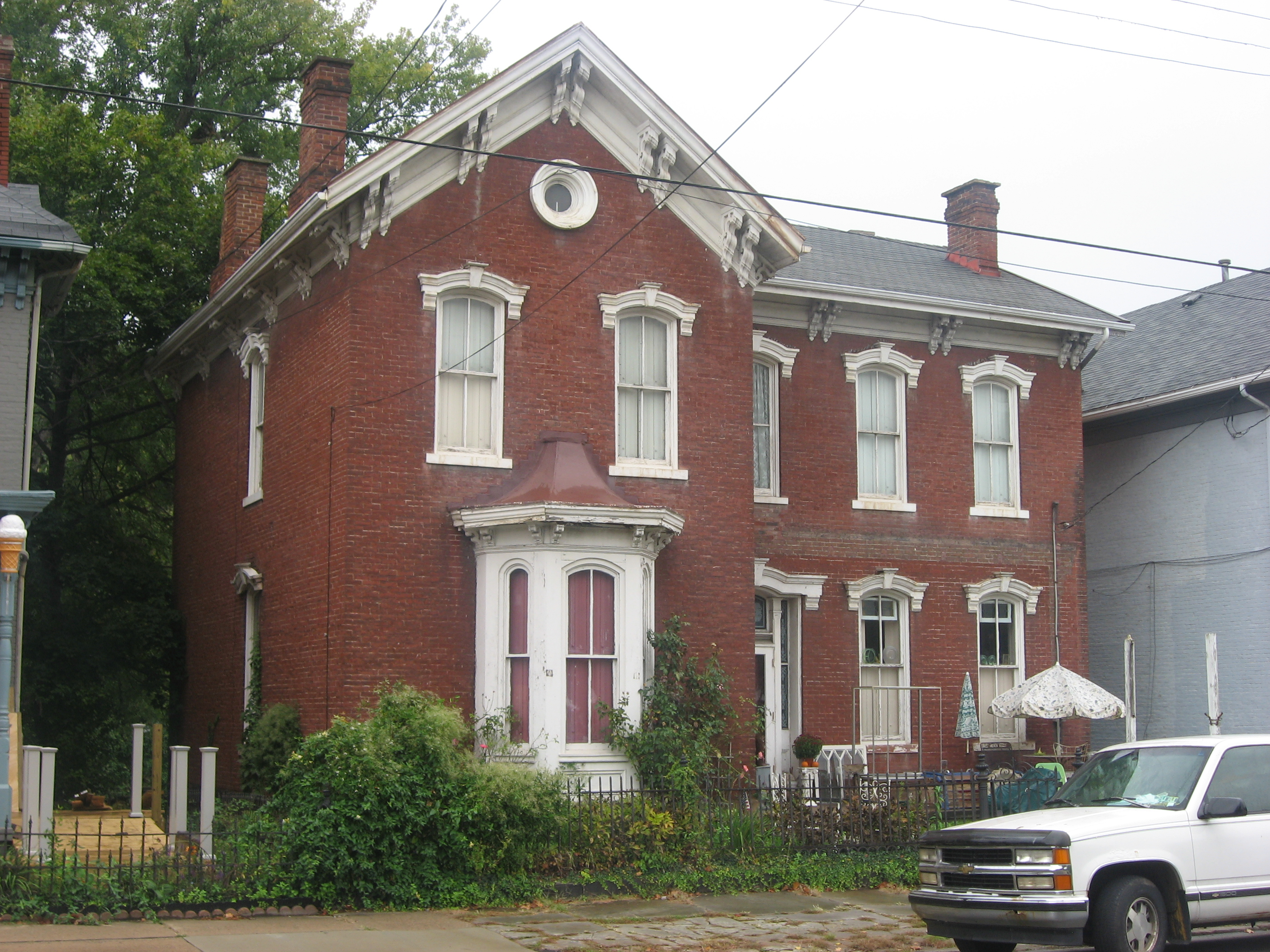
- Front of the house

- Location within Pennsylvania Location within the United States
- Location: 711 W. Main St., Monongahela, Pennsylvania
- Coordinates: 40°12′21″N 79°55′52″W
- Area: less than one acre
- Built: 1872
- Architect: John Blythe
- Architectural style: Italianate
- NRHP reference No.: 93000718
- Added to NRHP: August 2, 1993

David Longwell House is a historic building in Monongahela, Pennsylvania.

It is designated as a historic residential landmark/farmstead by the Washington County History & Landmarks Foundation.
