= Fallowfield Township, Washington County, Pennsylvania =

Township in Pennsylvania, US

Coordinates: 40°08′17″N 79°57′08″W

Fallowfield Township
- Township
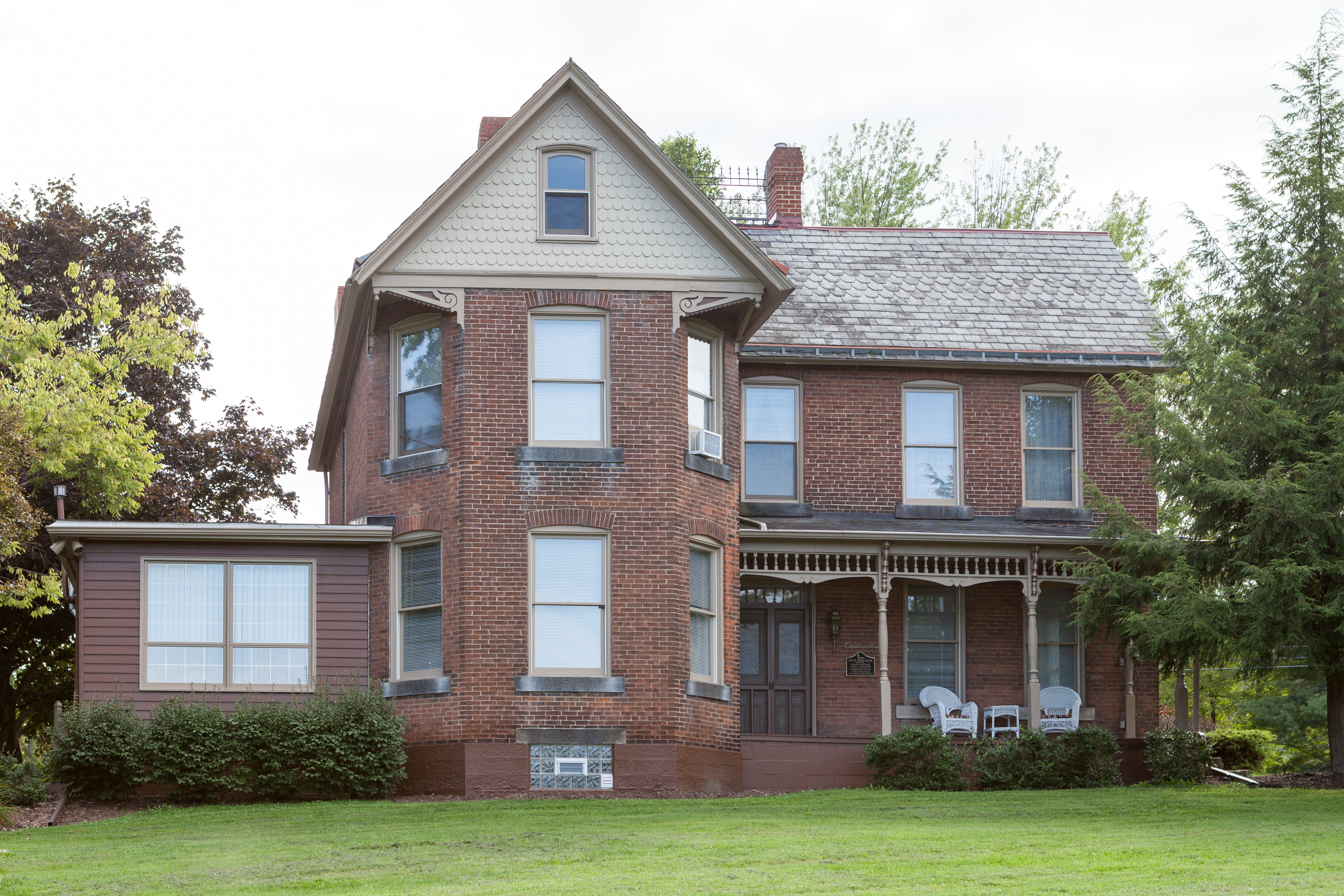
- The John H. Nelson House, a historic site in the township

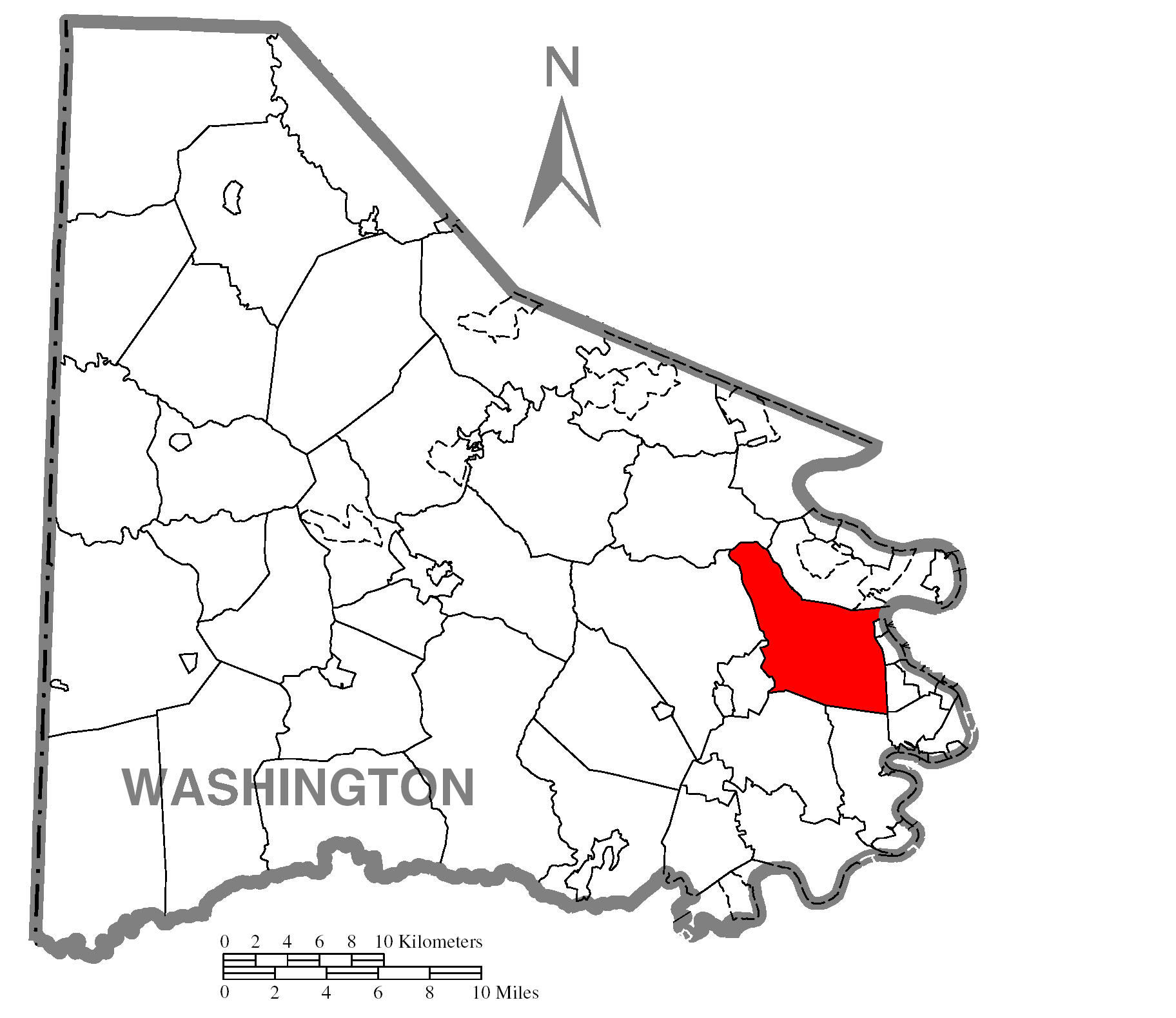
- Location of Fallowfield Township in Washington County

- Location of Washington County in Pennsylvania
- Country: United States
- State: Pennsylvania
- County: Washington County

Area
  - Total: 21.32 sq mi (55.22 km^{2})
  - Land: 21.27 sq mi (55.09 km^{2})
  - Water: 0.046 sq mi (0.12 km^{2})

Population (2020)
  - Total: 4,104 ▼
  - Estimate (2023): 4,038
  - Density: 199/sq mi (76.8/km^{2})
- Time zone: UTC-4 (EST)
  - Summer (DST): UTC-5 (EDT)
- Area code: 724
- FIPS code: 42-125-25104
- Website: https://fallowfieldtownship.org/

Historical population
| Census | Pop. | Note | %± |
|---|---|---|---|
| 2000 | 4,461 | | — |
| 2010 | 4,321 | | −3.1% |
| 2020 | 4,104 | | −5.0% |
| 2025 (est.) | 4,041 | | −1.5% |
U.S. Decennial Census

Fallowfield Township is a township in Washington County, Pennsylvania, United States. The population was 4,104 at the 2020 census.

== History ==
Fallowfield is named for Lancelot Fallowfield, one of the first purchasers of land from William Penn.

The John H. Nelson House was listed on the National Register of Historic Places in 2000.

== Geography ==
According to the United States Census Bureau, the township has a total area of 21.3 square miles (55 km^{2}), of which 21.3 square miles (55 km^{2}) is land and 0.04 square miles (0.10 km^{2}) (0.19%) is water. It contains the census-designated place of Van Voorhis.

== Surrounding neighborhoods ==
Fallowfield Township has nine land borders, including Carroll Township to the north, North Charleroi, Charleroi and Twilight to the east, California and West Pike Run Township to the south, Bentleyville to the southwest, Somerset Township from the west to northwest and Nottingham Township to the north-northwest. A short segment of Fallowfield Township in the northeastern corner runs adjacent with Monessen across the Monongahela River in Westmoreland County,

== Demographics ==
As of the census of 2000, there were 4,461 people, 1,765 households, and 1,313 families living in the township. The population density was 209.6 inhabitants per square mile (80.9/km^{2}). There were 1,878 housing units at an average density of 88.2 per square mile (34.1/km^{2}). The racial makeup of the township was 97.85% White, 1.43% African American, 0.07% Native American, 0.16% Asian, 0.07% from other races, and 0.43% from two or more races. Hispanic or Latino of any race were 0.63% of the population.

There were 1,765 households, out of which 24.9% had children under the age of 18 living with them, 63.6% were married couples living together, 7.8% had a female householder with no husband present, and 25.6% were non-families. 22.3% of all households were made up of individuals, and 12.0% had someone living alone who was 65 years of age or older. The average household size was 2.50 and the average family size was 2.92.

In the township the population was spread out, with 18.4% under the age of 18, 7.3% from 18 to 24, 24.6% from 25 to 44, 28.8% from 45 to 64, and 20.8% who were 65 years of age or older. The median age was 45 years. For every 100 females there were 95.5 males. For every 100 females age 18 and over, there were 93.3 males.

The median income for a household in the township was $41,943, and the median income for a family was $45,750. Males had a median income of $36,102 versus $29,159 for females. The per capita income for the township was $18,565. About 3.6% of families and 4.1% of the population were below the poverty line, including 2.7% of those under age 18 and 5.4% of those age 65 or over.
