= Cokeburg, Pennsylvania =

Borough in Pennsylvania, US

- Borough
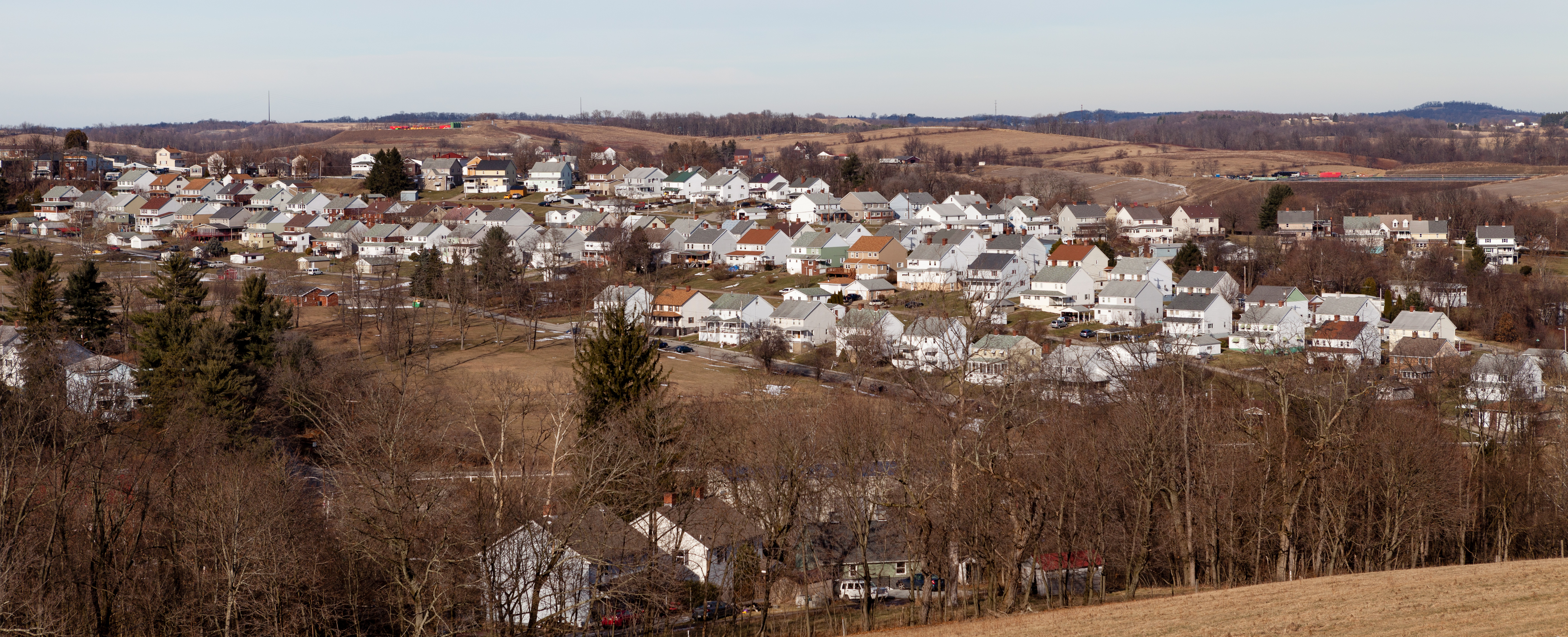
- General view (2015)

- Location of Cokeburg in Washington County, Pennsylvania.

- Location of Cokeburg in Pennsylvania
- Coordinates: 40°6′0″N 80°3′49″W
- Country: United States
- State: Pennsylvania
- County: Washington
- Established: 1902

Government
  - Mayor: Carol Basara

Area
  - Total: 0.35 sq mi (0.91 km^{2})
  - Land: 0.35 sq mi (0.91 km^{2})
  - Water: 0 sq mi (0.00 km^{2})

Population (2020)
  - Total: 629
  - Density: 1,789.1/sq mi (690.78/km^{2})
- Time zone: UTC-4 (EST)
  - Summer (DST): UTC-5 (EDT)
- ZIP code: 15324
- Area code: 724
- FIPS code: 42-14896
- Website: https://cokeburgboro.com/

Cokeburg is a borough in Washington County, Pennsylvania, United States and part of the Pittsburgh metropolitan area since 1950. Founded in 1902, the population was 626 at the 2020 census.

== Geography ==
Cokeburg is located at 40°6′0″N 80°3′49″W (40.100120, -80.063637).

According to the United States Census Bureau, the borough has a total area of 0.4 square miles (1.0 km^{2}), all land. Cokeburg is drained by Pigeon Creek.

The borough is crossed by Pennsylvania Route 917.

== Demographics ==
Historical population
Census	Pop.	Note	%±
1910	1,302		—
1920	1,691		29.9%
1930	1,550		−8.3%
1940	1,415		−8.7%
1950	1,170		−17.3%
1960	989		−15.5%
1970	845		−14.6%
1980	796		−5.8%
1990	724		−9.0%
2000	705		−2.6%
2010	630		−10.6%
2020	629		−0.2%
2025 (est.)	607	▼	−3.5%

At the 2000 census there were 705 people, 308 households, and 206 families living in the borough. The population density was 1,931.0 inhabitants per square mile (745.6/km^{2}). There were 339 housing units at an average density of 928.5 per square mile (358.5/km^{2}). The racial makeup of the borough was 98.87% White, 0.14% Asian, and 0.99% from two or more races. Of the 308 households 26.9% had children under the age of 18 living with them, 50.6% were married couples living together, 13.3% had a female householder with no husband present, and 33.1% were non-families. 31.2% of households were one person and 19.2% were one person aged 65 or older. The average household size was 2.29 and the average family size was 2.85.

The age distribution was 21.0% under the age of 18, 6.8% from 18 to 24, 27.0% from 25 to 44, 23.5% from 45 to 64, and 21.7% 65 or older. The median age was 42 years. For every 100 females, there were 85.0 males. For every 100 females age 18 and over, there were 81.4 males.

The median household income was $30,179 and the median family income was $39,028. Males had a median income of $32,404 versus $19,514 for females. The per capita income for the borough was $15,754. About 6.9% of families and 9.9% of the population were below the poverty line, including 14.9% of those under age 18 and 13.2% of those age 65 or over.

== In popular culture ==
The series final episode of the TV series Quantum Leap, starring Scott Bakula and airing on May 4, 1993, on NBC, was set in Cokeburg. The site was chosen because it was the childhood home of the show's creator, Donald P. Bellisario.

== Notable person ==
- Donald P. Bellisario (born August 8, 1935): television producer and screenwriter
