= Monongahela, Pennsylvania =

City in Pennsylvania, US

- City
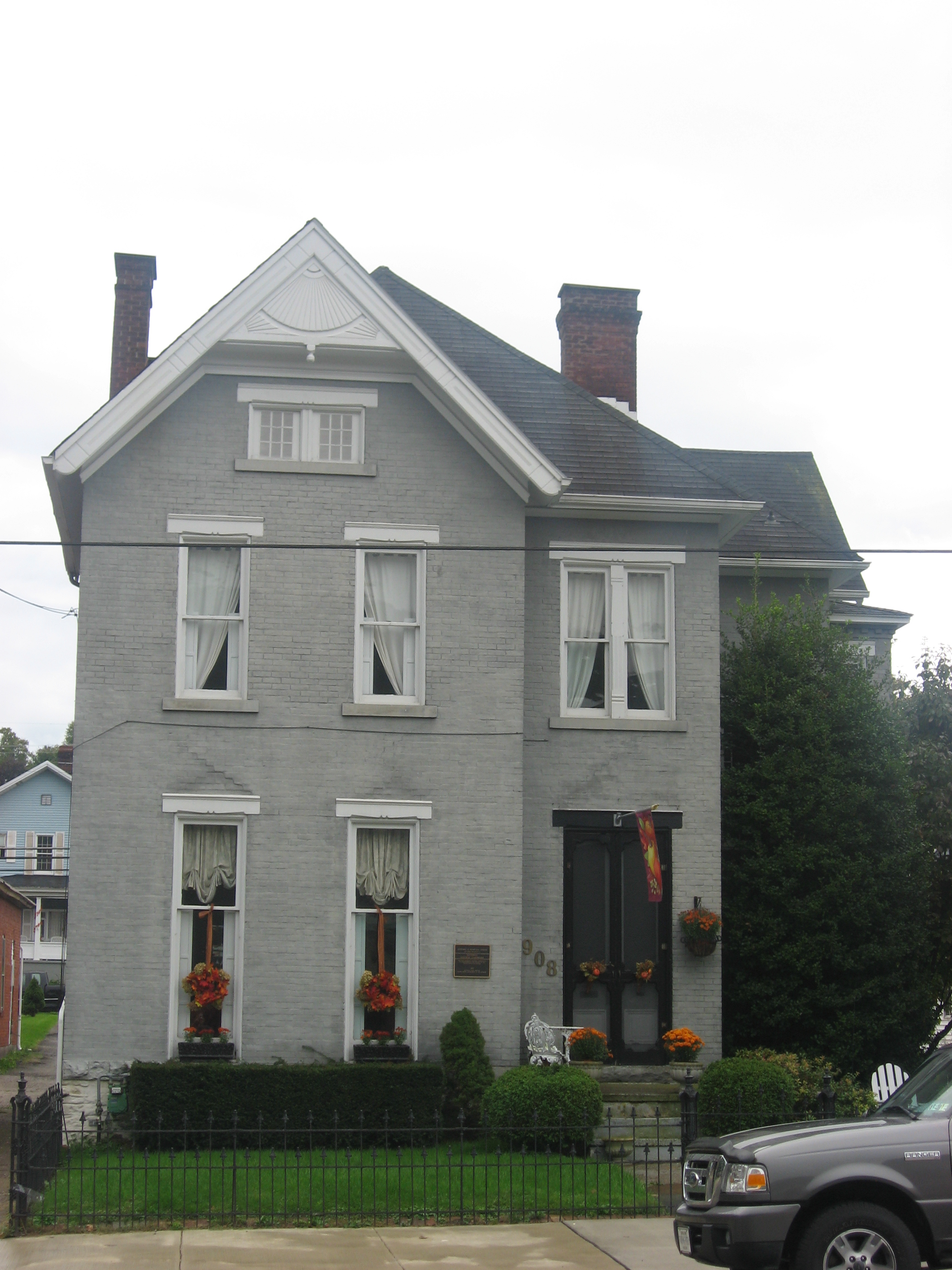
- Edward G. Acheson House

- Seal
- Nickname: Mon City
- Location of Monongahela in Washington County, Pennsylvania.

- Location within Pennsylvania Location within the United States
- Coordinates: 40°12′02″N 79°55′42″W
- Country: United States
- State: Pennsylvania
- County: Washington
- Established: 1770

Government
  - Mayor: Greg Garry

Area
  - Total: 2.08 sq mi (5.40 km^{2})
  - Land: 1.91 sq mi (4.95 km^{2})
  - Water: 0.17 sq mi (0.45 km^{2})
- Elevation: 750 ft (230 m)

Population (2020)
  - Total: 4,159
  - Density: 2,174.1/sq mi (839.43/km^{2})
- Time zone: UTC-5 (Eastern (EST))
  - Summer (DST): UTC-4 (EDT)
- ZIP Code: 15063
- Area code: 724
- FIPS code: 42-50408
- Website: cityofmonongahela-pa.gov

Monongahela, referred to locally as Mon City, is a third-class city in Washington County, Pennsylvania, United States. The population was 4,149 at the 2020 census. It is part of the Pittsburgh metropolitan area, about 17 miles (27 km) south of Pittsburgh proper.

The city of Monongahela sits at a location where several locally important Pennsylvania state routes meet: a concurrency between Pennsylvania routes 88, 136, and 837 makes up most of the length of the city's Main Street, and the city's Park Avenue carries Pennsylvania route 481 to its northern terminus at Main Street.

Monongahela is one of just two cities in Washington County, and is the second smallest city in Pennsylvania (after Parker). The town is served by the Ringgold School District.

== History ==
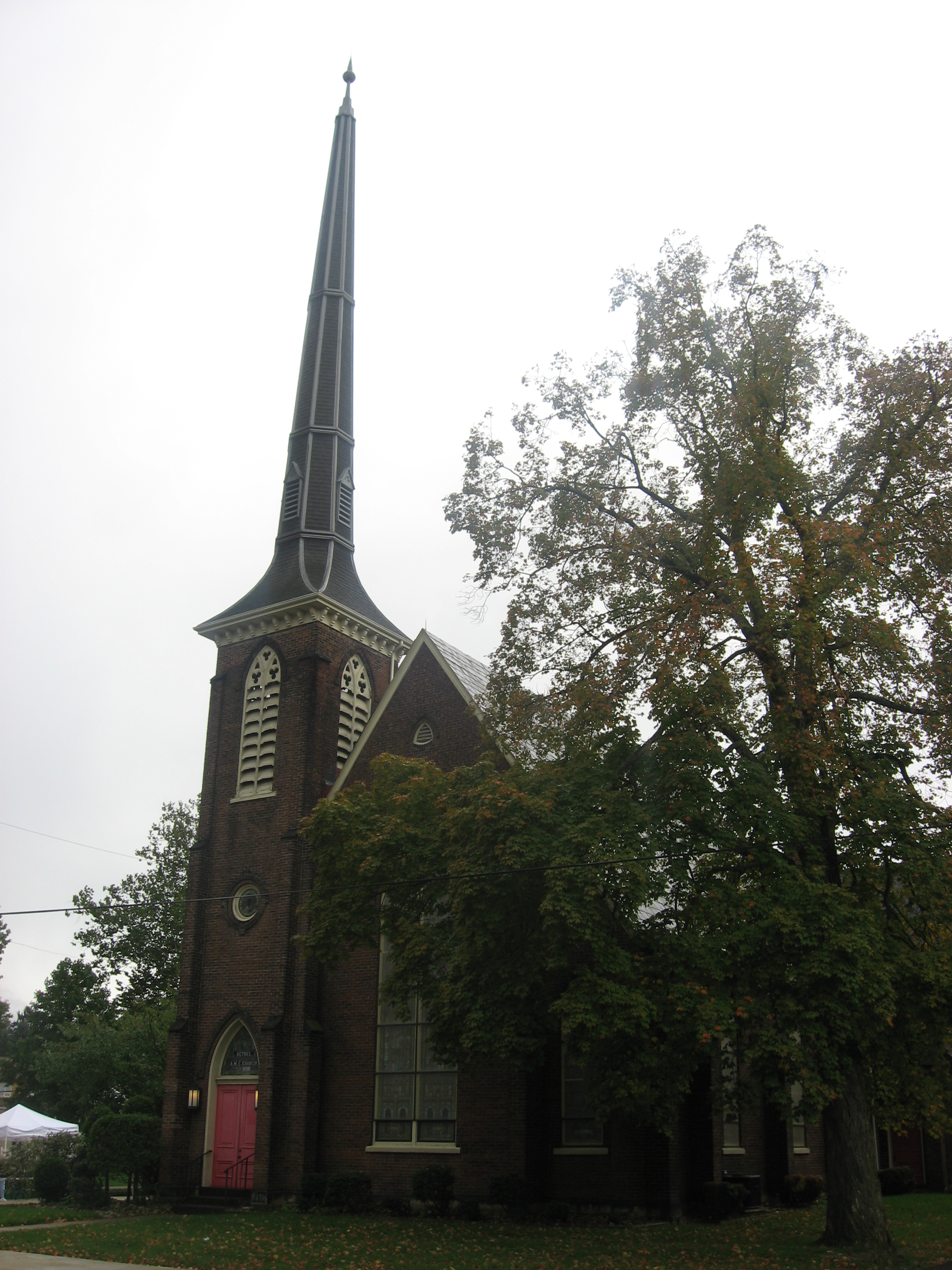
Bethel African Methodist Episcopal Church of Monongahela City

Monongahela was founded in 1769 on a tract of land near the confluence of Pigeon Creek and the Monongahela River. It is the oldest settlement in the Monongahela River Valley and most likely the oldest in Washington County. The word Monongahela is Native American in origin, meaning "falling banks". The Monongahela tribe was also indigenous to the area prior to the settlement of the city.

The original tract of land was actually owned by three different men, who named their land areas Eden, Paradise, and Gloucester. Joseph Parkison, who operated a ferry on the west bank of the Monongahela River, is recognized as the founder of the city. Parkison built the town's first post office, and in 1782 the town was officially recognized as Parkison's Ferry. Adam Wickerham took claim to 130 acres (0.53 km^{2}) on the Parkison Ferry tract on July 1, 1788. On this tract he laid out Georgetown in 1807. Georgetown was made part of Williamsport by Wickerham on February 23, 1816. In 1833, the first borough officers were elected for Williamsport. On April 1, 1837, Williamsport was given the name Monongahela City and in 1893 shortened to Monongahela.

The city contains a number of streets which are named in honor of prominent Civil War figures including: Lincoln, Grant, Sherman, Stanton, Meade, Hancock, Thomas, Howard, Geary, and Sheridan.

The Edward G. Acheson House, Bethel African Methodist Episcopal Church of Monongahela City, David Longwell House, and Monongahela Cemetery are listed on the National Register of Historic Places.

== Geography and climate ==
Monongahela is located at 40°12′2″N 79°55′42″W (40.200462, -79.928394).

According to the United States Census Bureau, the city has a total area of 2.1 square miles (5.4 km^{2}), of which 1.9 square miles (4.9 km^{2}) is land and 0.2 square miles (0.52 km^{2}) (9.86%) is water.

The city receives 37.65 inches (956 mm) of rainfall annually and has a mean annual temperature of 63 °F (17 °C).

=== Surrounding and adjacent neighborhoods ===
Monongahela has two land borders, with Carroll Township to the east and south, and New Eagle to the west. Across the Monongahela River, the Allegheny County municipality of Forward Township runs adjacent to the city.

== Demographics ==
Historical population
Census	Pop.	Note	%±
1840	752		—
1850	977		29.9%
1860	999		2.3%
1870	1,078		7.9%
1880	2,904		169.4%
1890	4,096		41.0%
1900	5,173		26.3%
1910	7,598		46.9%
1920	8,688		14.3%
1930	8,675		−0.1%
1940	8,825		1.7%
1950	8,922		1.1%
1960	8,388		−6.0%
1970	7,113		−15.2%
1980	5,950		−16.4%
1990	4,928		−17.2%
2000	4,761		−3.4%
2010	4,300		−9.7%
2020	4,159		−3.3%
2025 (est.)	4,041		−2.8%

=== 2020 census ===
As of the 2020 census, Monongahela had a population of 4,159. The median age was 44.2 years. 18.6% of residents were under the age of 18 and 19.2% of residents were 65 years of age or older. For every 100 females there were 91.8 males, and for every 100 females age 18 and over there were 87.6 males age 18 and over.

97.8% of residents lived in urban areas, while 2.2% lived in rural areas.

There were 1,962 households in Monongahela, of which 22.0% had children under the age of 18 living in them. Of all households, 33.7% were married-couple households, 22.4% were households with a male householder and no spouse or partner present, and 35.9% were households with a female householder and no spouse or partner present. About 40.0% of all households were made up of individuals and 17.0% had someone living alone who was 65 years of age or older.

There were 2,244 housing units, of which 12.6% were vacant. The homeowner vacancy rate was 3.0% and the rental vacancy rate was 9.3%.

Racial composition as of the 2020 census
Race	Number	Percent
White	3,672	88.3%
Black or African American	134	3.2%
American Indian and Alaska Native	13	0.3%
Asian	12	0.3%
Native Hawaiian and Other Pacific Islander	1	0.0%
Some other race	24	0.6%
Two or more races	303	7.3%
Hispanic or Latino (of any race)	116	2.8%

=== 2000 census ===
As of the census of 2000, there were 4,761 people, 2,139 households, and 1,264 families residing in the town. The population density was 2,472.4 inhabitants per square mile (954.6/km^{2}). There were 2,382 housing units at an average density of 1,237.0 units per square mile (477.6 units/km^{2}). The racial makeup of the city was 94.94% White, 3.26% African American, 0.08% Native American, 0.19% Asian, 0.42% from other races, and 1.11% from two or more races. Hispanic or Latino of any race were 0.71% of the population.

There were 2,139 households, out of which 23.0% had children under the age of 18 living with them, 42.0% were married couples living together, 12.8% had a female householder with no husband present, and 40.9% were non-families. 36.3% of all households were made up of individuals, and 19.6% had someone living alone who was 65 years of age or older. The average household size was 2.20 and the average family size was 2.87.

In the city, the population was spread out, with 20.1% under the age of 18, 6.9% from 18 to 24, 27.4% from 25 to 44, 22.6% from 45 to 64, and 23.0% who were 65 years of age or older. The median age was 42 years. For every 100 females, there were 85.3 males. For every 100 females age 18 and over, there were 80.6 males.

The median income for a household in the city was $29,060, and the median income for a family was $36,528. Males had a median income of $31,250 versus $23,911 for females. The per capita income for the city was $16,903. About 11.1% of families and 13.6% of the population were below the poverty line, including 25.9% of those under age 18 and 7.2% of those age 65 or over.

== Culture ==
Monongahela is home to several parks, playgrounds and a museum. Chess Park, located near the center of the city, hosts community events throughout the year. The Mounds Park, built on the site of an ancient Indian Burial Ground, is a local playground and sports complex. On the banks of the Monongahela River is the Aquatorium, a waterfront venue that hosts the annual Fourth of July celebration and an annual summer concert series. The Monongahela Area Historical Society Museum located on Main Street serves as a community archive and has local historical artifacts on display.

Whiskey Point, a bluff overlooking the Monongahela River located within the city, was an important meeting place during the Whiskey Rebellion. The Pennsylvania State Historical Marker located here reads: "The bluff at Main St. and Park Ave. was the site on Aug. 14, 1794, of a meeting of 226 whiskey rebels. Albert Gallatin's eloquence turned the tide, resulting in peaceful ending of the Whiskey Rebellion and the possibility of civil strife." Today, "Monongahela Rye" (also called Pennsylvania Rye) is a style of rye whiskey characterized by its mash bill containing 95% or more rye, thereby making for a spicier whiskey, barrel-aging notwithstanding. While regionally recognized, this term has no legal binding.

Many buildings in Monongahela, such as the Longwell House and the Bethel A.M.E Church, were used by freed slaves as stops on the Underground Railroad.

There are twenty churches representing fifteen denominations located in Monongahela, including The Church of Jesus Christ (Bickertonite), which has its worldwide headquarters in Monongahela.

=== Park Avenue ===
Park Avenue in Monongahela was home to numerous notable residents. NFL Hall of Fame quarterback Joe Montana grew up on the road. Other notable residents have included Carl E. Vuono, four-star general and Chief of Staff of the U.S. Army; Jim Jimirro, founder of the Disney Channel; Fred Cox, all-time leading scorer for the Minnesota Vikings and inventor of the Nerf ball; Dr. Ronald V. Pellegrini, a world-renowned cardiothoracic surgeon based in Pittsburgh; National Book Award winner, Deirdre Bair; and former Pittsburgh Pirate pitcher, Ron Necciai, who is the only professional baseball player to strike out 27 batters in one game.

A 90-minute documentary about Park Avenue's notable residents, titled "One Extraordinary Street" was produced by Laura M. Magone and released in 2008. Magone, a graduate of Duquesne University and a Monongahela native, spent several years interviewing persons who lived on Park Avenue in an attempt to determine if there was a common thread that may have contributed to their many successes. The film also includes cameo appearances by Stan Musial and retired four-star general Colin Powell.

== Government ==
As of February 2020, the current mayor of Monongahela is Greg Garry.

== Education ==
It is in the Ringgold School District.

== Notable people ==
- Edward Goodrich Acheson, chemist, inventor of Carborundum
- Jay Chattaway, composer for Star Trek
- Fred Cox, former NFL kicker
- Mitch Daniels, former Governor of Indiana and Director of the U.S. Office of Management and Budget
- Ame Deal, 10-year-old girl who was tortured and murdered by her family
- John Taylor Gatto, educator and writer
- Roland Kibbee, screenwriter and producer
- Joe Montana, former NFL quarterback
- Eugenie Maria Morenus, mathematician, graduated from Monongahela High School in 1898
- Jackie Ormes, American cartoonist
- Anthony Peterson, former NFL linebacker
- Jim Renacci, former U.S. representative for Ohio's 16th congressional district
- Dale Stoffel, defense contractor and whistleblower, assassinated in Iraq
- Carl E. Vuono, U.S. Army general
- Scott Zolak, former NFL quarterback
