= Bentleyville, Pennsylvania =

Borough in Pennsylvania, US

- Borough
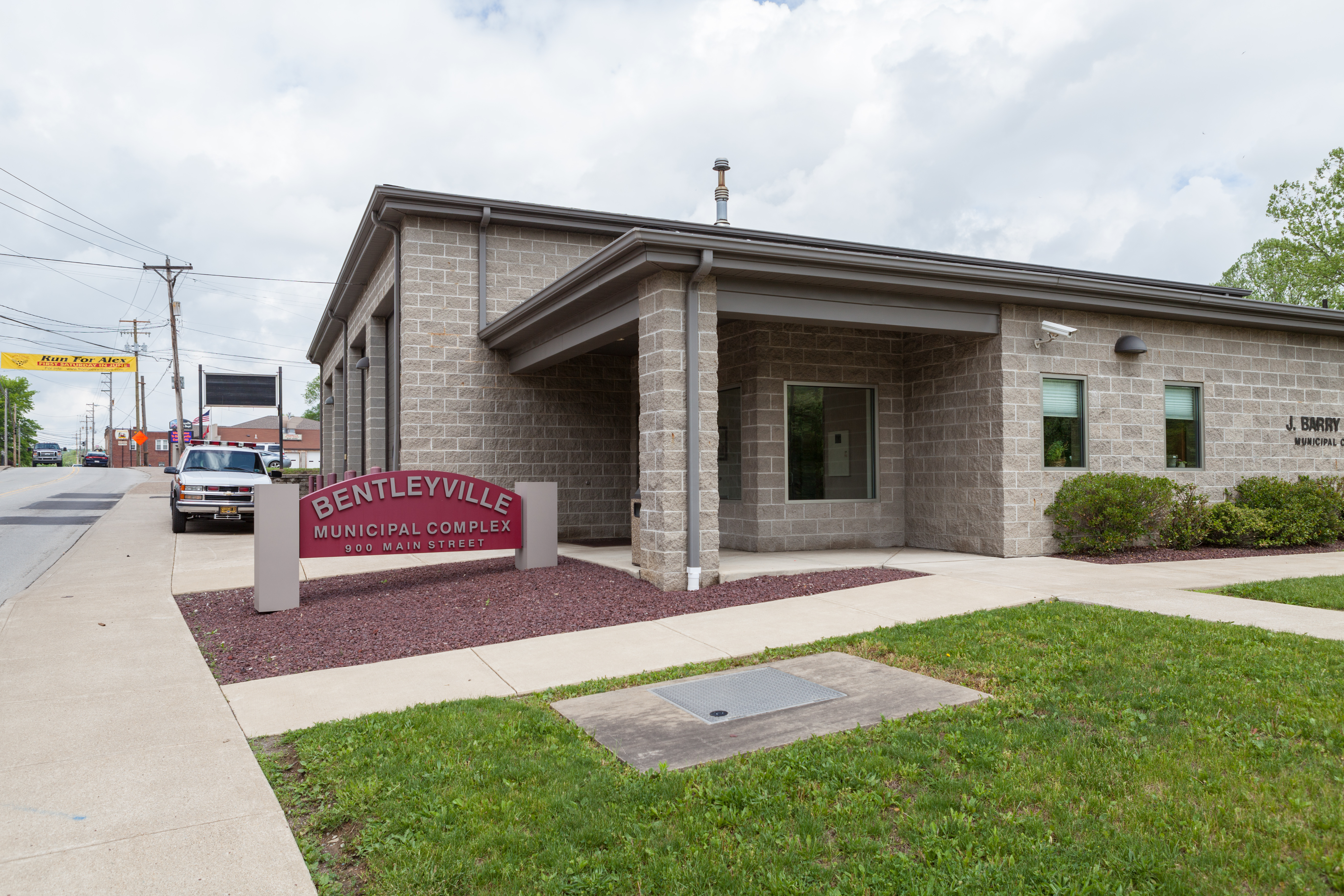
- Municipal complex
- Etymology: Sheshbazzar Bentley Jr. (founder)
- Location of Bentleyville in Washington County, Pennsylvania.

- Location of Bentleyville in Pennsylvania
- Coordinates: 40°7′11″N 80°0′22″W
- Country: United States
- State: Pennsylvania
- County: Washington
- Established: 1870

Government
  - Mayor: Timothy Jansante

Area
  - Total: 3.69 sq mi (9.57 km^{2})
  - Land: 3.69 sq mi (9.57 km^{2})
  - Water: 0 sq mi (0.00 km^{2})

Population (2020)
  - Total: 2,352
  - Density: 636.5/sq mi (245.75/km^{2})
- Time zone: UTC-4 (EST)
  - Summer (DST): UTC-5 (EDT)
- Zip Code: 15314
- Area codes: 724, 878
- FIPS code: 42-05672
- Website: http://www.bentleyvilleborough.com/

Bentleyville is a borough in Washington County, Pennsylvania, United States and has been part of the Pittsburgh metropolitan area since 1950. The population was 2,349 at the 2020 census.

== History ==
A post office called Bentleyville has been in operation since 1822. Bentleyville was named for Sheshbazzar Bentley Jr., a pioneer settler. The borough was incorporated in 1864.

== Geography ==
Bentleyville is located at 40°7′11″N 80°0′22″W (40.119799, -80.006146). Interstate 70 borders the borough's northern side and Pennsylvania state Route 917 forms Main Street.

According to the United States Census Bureau, the borough has a total area of 3.7 square miles (9.6 km^{2}), all land; except Pigeon Creek passes through the borough.

== Demographics ==
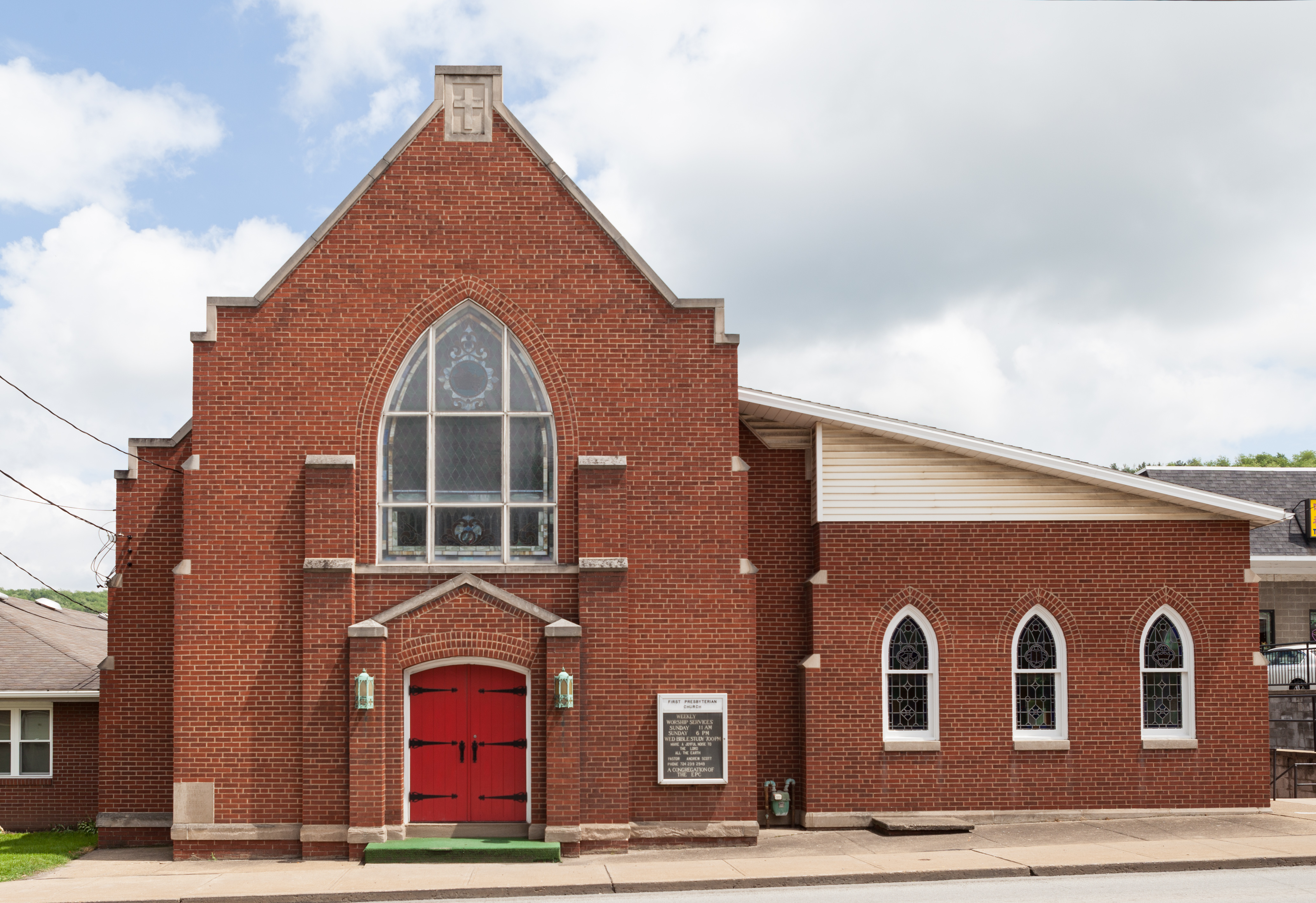
First Presbyterian Church on Main Street

Historical population
Census	Pop.	Note	%±
1870	277		—
1880	263		−5.1%
1890	229		−12.9%
1900	613		167.7%
1910	1,922		213.5%
1920	3,679		91.4%
1930	3,609		−1.9%
1940	3,426		−5.1%
1950	3,295		−3.8%
1960	3,160		−4.1%
1970	2,714		−14.1%
1980	2,525		−7.0%
1990	2,673		5.9%
2000	2,502		−6.4%
2010	2,581		3.2%
2020	2,352		−8.9%
2025 (est.)	2,326	▼	−1.1%

As of the census of 2000, there were 2,502 people, 1,073 households, and 679 families residing in the borough. The population density was 678.2 people per square mile (261.9 people/km^{2}). There were 1,174 housing units at an average density of 318.2 per square mile (122.9/km^{2}). The racial makeup of the borough was 96.76% White, 1.52% African American, 0.12% Native American, 0.04% Asian, 0.12% from other races, and 1.44% from two or more races. Hispanic or Latino of any race were 0.48% of the population.

There were 1,073 households, out of which 27.6% had children under the age of 18 living with them, 43.5% were married couples living together, 16.2% had a female householder with no husband present, and 36.7% were non-families. 33.6% of all households were made up of individuals, and 16.9% had someone living alone who was 65 years of age or older. The average household size was 2.29 and the average family size was 2.91.

In the borough the population was spread out, with 22.5% under the age of 18, 8.1% from 18 to 24, 27.0% from 25 to 44, 21.3% from 45 to 64, and 21.0% who were 65 years of age or older. The median age was 40 years. For every 100 females, there were 91.4 males. For every 100 females age 18 and over, there were 86.3 males.

The median income for a household in the borough was $26,875, and the median income for a family was $35,652. Males had a median income of $35,588 versus $22,021 for females. The per capita income for the borough was $19,235. About 12.3% of families and 18.6% of the population were below the poverty line, including 25.7% of those under age 18 and 8.4% of those age 65 or over.

== Government ==
The borough has a "mayor-council" form of government. Most power is vested in the popularly elected council which chooses its president. The mayor has veto power over legislation. Tim Jansante is currently the mayor of Bentleyville.

Education is provided by the Bentworth School District.

== Police ==
The borough disbanded its police force in 2005 as a cost savings measure and depended on the state police. In 2009, the borough contracted with Southwest Regional Police, and in 2014, Bentleyville again has its own police force.

== See also ==
- People from Bentleyville
