= Carroll Township, Washington County, Pennsylvania =

Township in Pennsylvania, US

Coordinates: 40°10′54.8″N 79°56′9.01″W

Carroll Township
- Township
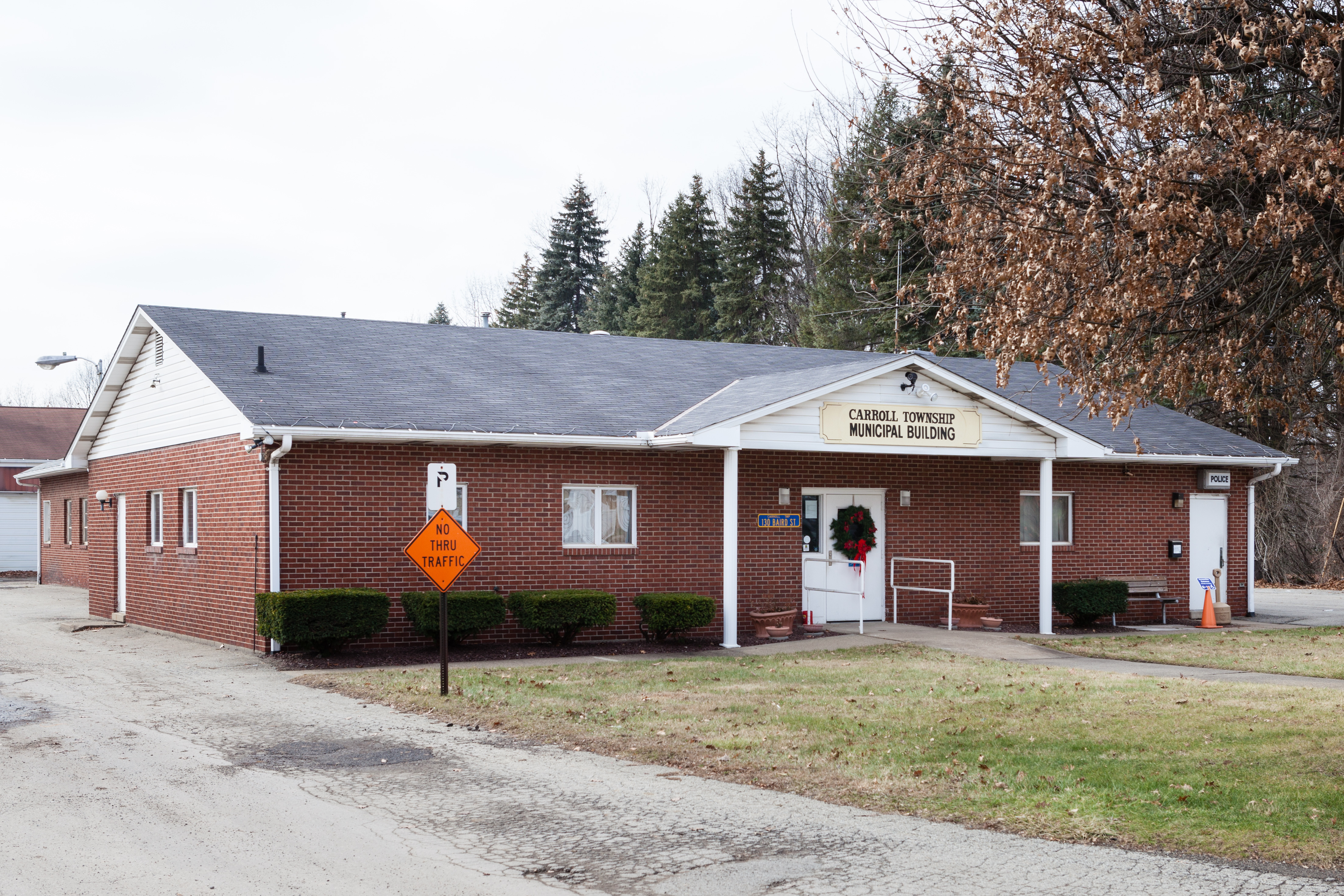
- Municipal building

- Logo

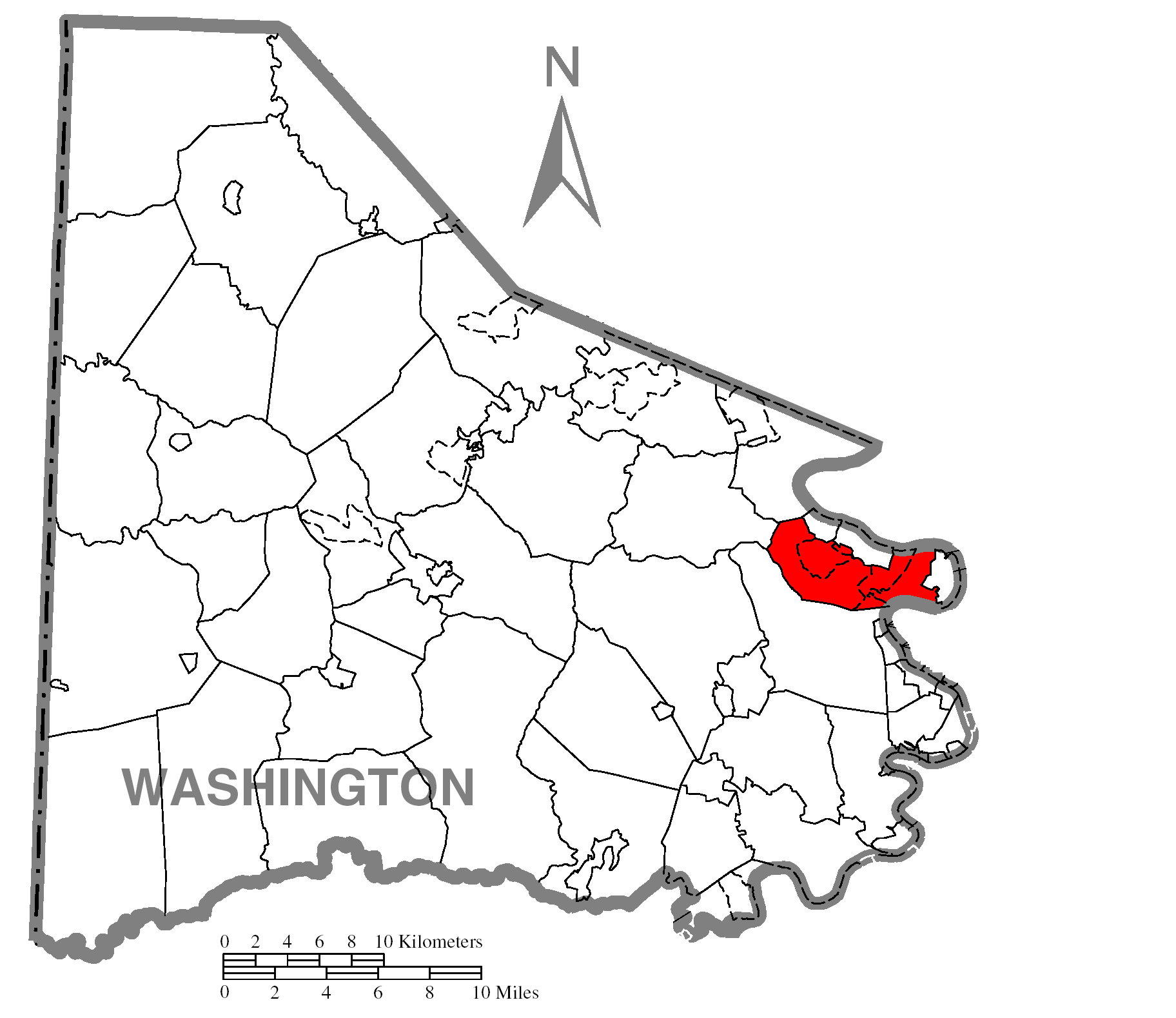
- Location of Carroll Township in Washington County

- Location of Washington County in Pennsylvania
- Country: United States
- State: Pennsylvania
- County: Washington

Area
  - Total: 13.78 sq mi (35.69 km^{2})
  - Land: 13.48 sq mi (34.91 km^{2})
  - Water: 0.30 sq mi (0.77 km^{2})

Population (2020)
  - Total: 5,382 ▼
  - Estimate (2023): 5,315
  - Density: 409.6/sq mi (158.16/km^{2})
- Time zone: UTC-4 (EST)
  - Summer (DST): UTC-5 (EDT)
- Area code: 724
- FIPS code: 42-125-11424
- Website: www.carrolltownshippa.org

Historical population
Census	Pop.	Note	%±
2000	5,677		—
2010	5,640		−0.7%
2020	5,382		−4.6%
2025 (est.)	5,274		−2.0%
U.S. Decennial Census

Carroll Township is a township in Washington County, Pennsylvania, United States. The population was 5,382 at the 2020 census.

== Geography ==
According to the United States Census Bureau, the township has a total area of 13.8 square miles (36 km^{2}), of which 13.5 square miles (35 km^{2}) is land and 0.3 square miles (0.78 km^{2}) (1.96%) is water. It contains the census-designated places of Baidland and Wickherham Manor-Fisher.

== Demographics ==
At the 2000 census there were 5,677 people, 2,265 households, and 1,701 families living in the township. The population density was 420.4 people per square mile (162.3 people/km^{2}). There were 2,344 housing units at an average density of 173.6 per square mile (67.0/km^{2}). The racial makeup of the township was 98.26% White, 1.09% African American, 0.05% Native American, 0.11% Asian, 0.05% Pacific Islander, 0.21% from other races, and 0.23% from two or more races. Hispanic or Latino of any race were 0.74%.

Of the 2,265 households 26.0% had children under the age of 18 living with them, 63.4% were married couples living together, 7.8% had a female householder with no husband present, and 24.9% were non-families. 22.3% of households were one person and 13.2% were one person aged 65 or older. The average household size was 2.45 and the average family size was 2.85.

The age distribution was 19.6% under the age of 18, 4.9% from 18 to 24, 24.1% from 25 to 44, 26.8% from 45 to 64, and 24.7% 65 or older. The median age was 46 years. For every 100 females, there were 93.0 males. For every 100 females age 18 and over, there were 90.7 males.

The median household income was $43,347 and the median family income was $52,526. Males had a median income of $40,970 versus $24,698 for females. The per capita income for the township was $20,380. About 4.8% of families and 6.4% of the population were below the poverty line, including 6.8% of those under age 18 and 8.9% of those age 65 or over.

== See also ==
- Hazel Kirk, Pennsylvania
