= Thompsonville, Pennsylvania =

Unincorporated community in Pennsylvania, US

Thompsonville
- Census-designated place
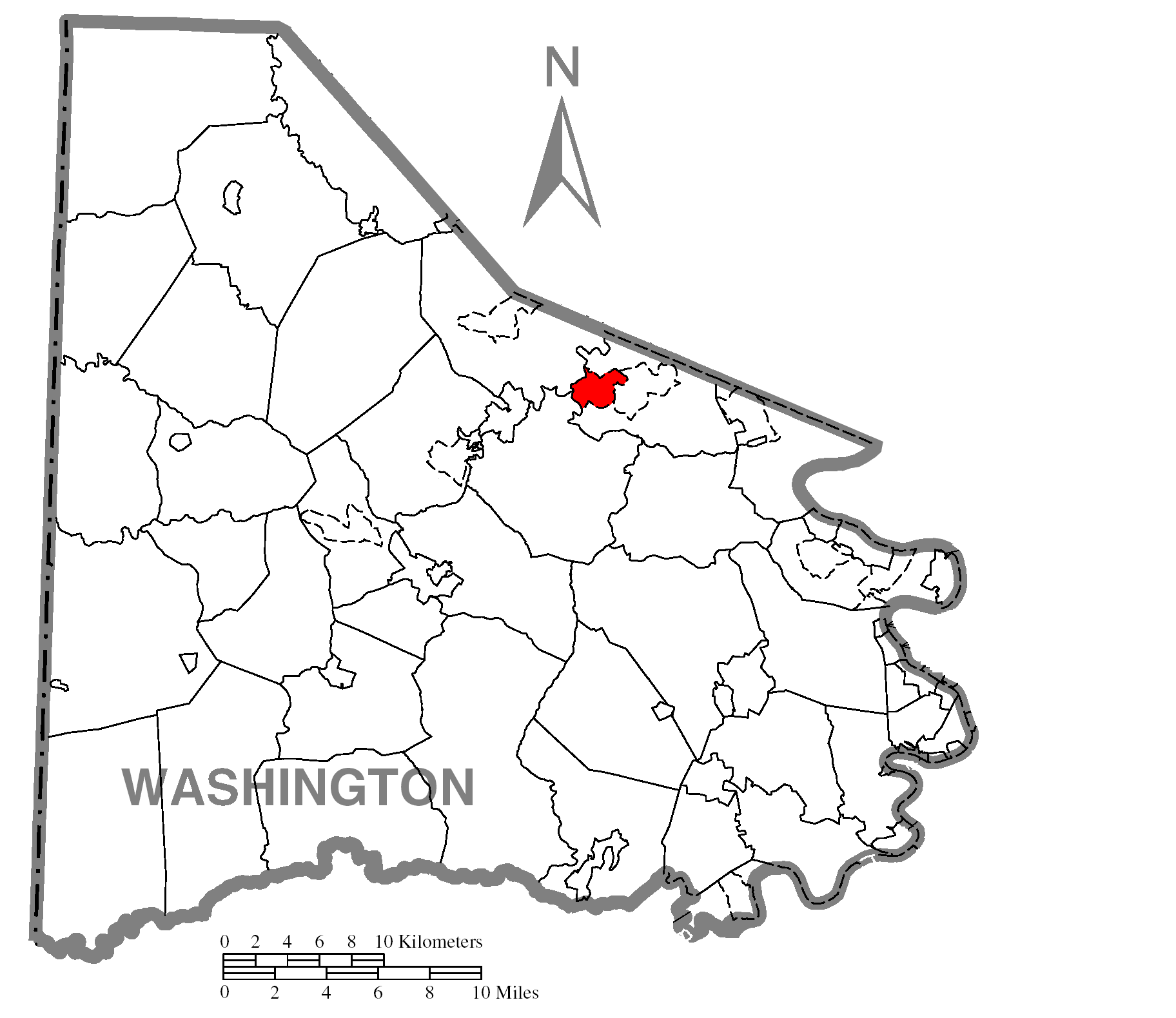
- Location of Thompsonville in Washington County
- Coordinates: 40°16′53″N 80°7′11″W
- Country: United States
- State: Pennsylvania
- County: Washington

Area
  - Total: 2.1 sq mi (5.4 km^{2})

Population (2010)
  - Total: 3,520
  - Density: 1,700/sq mi (650/km^{2})
- Time zone: UTC-4 (EST)
  - Summer (DST): UTC-5 (EDT)
- ZIP code: 15317
- Area code: 724

Thompsonville is a census-designated place (CDP) in Peters Township, Washington County, Pennsylvania, United States. The population was 3,520 at the 2010 census.

== Geography ==
Thompsonville is located at 40°16′53″N 80°7′11″W (40.281373, -80.119665).

According to the United States Census Bureau, the CDP has a total area of 2.1 square miles (5.4 km^{2}), of which, 2.0 square miles (5.2 km^{2}) of it is land and 0.04 square miles (0.10 km^{2}) of it (1.44%) is water.

== Demographics ==
=== 2020 census ===
As of the 2020 census, Thompsonville had a population of 3,704. The median age was 50.6 years. 21.3% of residents were under the age of 18 and 30.2% of residents were 65 years of age or older. For every 100 females there were 95.1 males, and for every 100 females age 18 and over there were 92.9 males age 18 and over.

100.0% of residents lived in urban areas, while 0.0% lived in rural areas.

There were 1,330 households in Thompsonville, of which 28.4% had children under the age of 18 living in them. Of all households, 71.4% were married-couple households, 10.3% were households with a male householder and no spouse or partner present, and 16.1% were households with a female householder and no spouse or partner present. About 18.8% of all households were made up of individuals and 11.6% had someone living alone who was 65 years of age or older.

There were 1,412 housing units, of which 5.8% were vacant. The homeowner vacancy rate was 2.2% and the rental vacancy rate was 20.3%.

Racial composition as of the 2020 census
Race	Number	Percent
White	3,483	94.0%
Black or African American	34	0.9%
American Indian and Alaska Native	3	0.1%
Asian	49	1.3%
Native Hawaiian and Other Pacific Islander	0	0.0%
Some other race	15	0.4%
Two or more races	120	3.2%
Hispanic or Latino (of any race)	44	1.2%

=== 2000 census ===
At the 2000 census there were 3,592 people, 1,228 households, and 1,024 families living in the CDP. The population density was 1,753.8 people per square mile (677.1 people/km^{2}). There were 1,254 housing units at an average density of 612.3 per square mile (236.4/km^{2}). The racial makeup of the CDP was 98.13% White, 0.33% African American, 0.06% Native American, 0.81% Asian, 0.28% from other races, and 0.39% from two or more races. Hispanic or Latino of any race were 0.70%.

Of the 1,228 households 34.7% had children under the age of 18 living with them, 76.8% were married couples living together, 4.3% had a female householder with no husband present, and 16.6% were non-families. 14.7% of households were one person and 7.6% were one person aged 65 or older. The average household size was 2.73 and the average family size was 3.03.

The age distribution was 24.3% under the age of 18, 4.0% from 18 to 24, 20.7% from 25 to 44, 29.0% from 45 to 64, and 22.0% 65 or older. The median age was 46 years. For every 100 females, there were 88.5 males. For every 100 females age 18 and over, there were 84.6 males.

The median household income was $75,000 and the median family income was $89,587. Males had a median income of $70,240 versus $38,839 for females. The per capita income for the CDP was $36,853. About 2.5% of families and 3.9% of the population were below the poverty line, including 2.2% of those under age 18 and 3.9% of those age 65 or over.

== Education ==
It is in the Peters Township School District.
