= Wolfdale, Pennsylvania =

Unincorporated community in Pennsylvania, US

Wolfdale
- Census-designated place
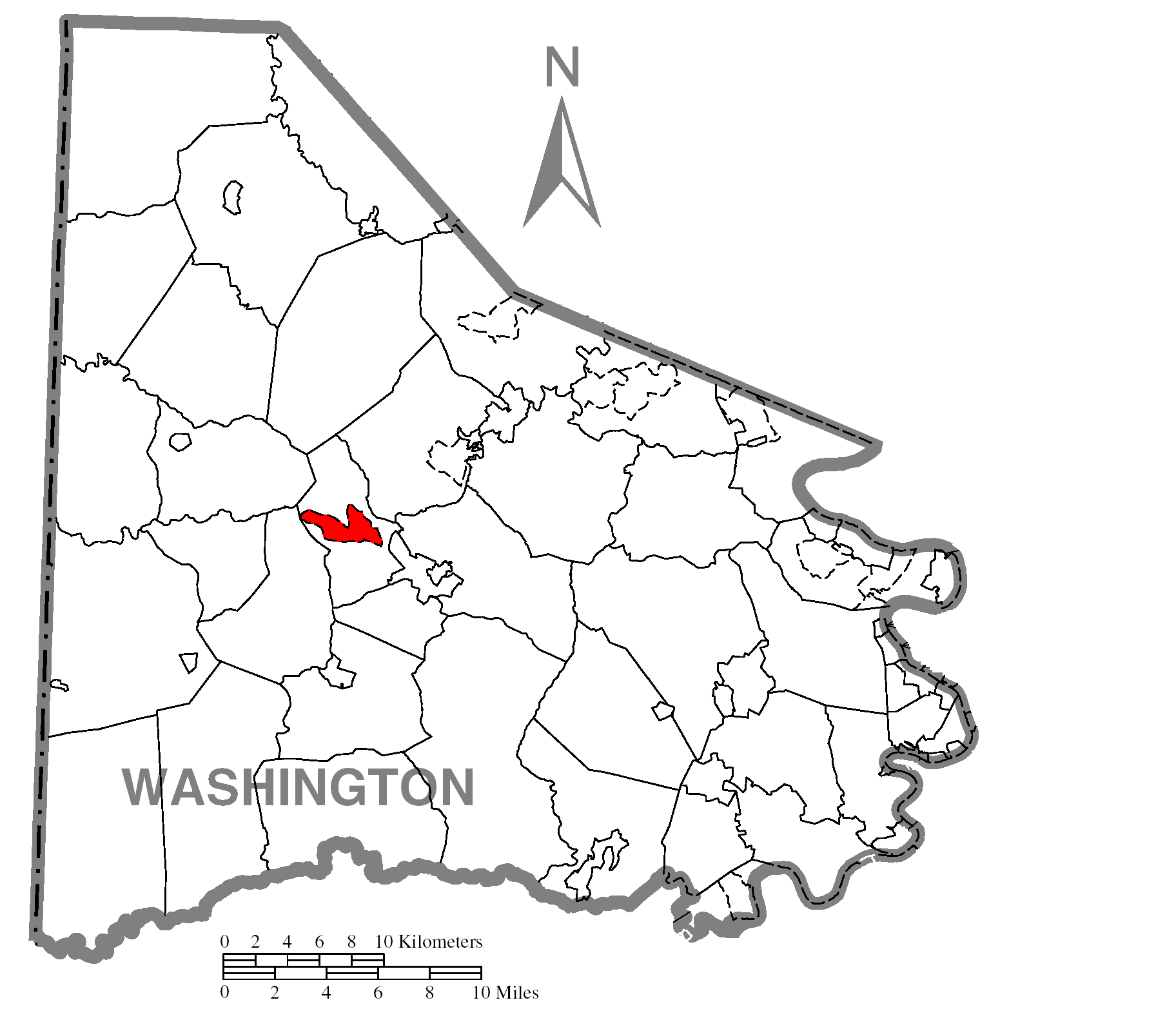
- Location of Wolfdale in Washington County, Pennsylvania

- Location of Washington County in Pennsylvania
- Coordinates: 40°11′45″N 80°17′35″W
- Country: United States
- State: Pennsylvania
- County: Washington

Area
  - Total: 2.4 sq mi (6.2 km^{2})

Population (2010)
  - Total: 2,888
  - Density: 1,202.9/sq mi (464.4/km^{2})
- Time zone: UTC-4 (EST)
  - Summer (DST): UTC-5 (EDT)
- ZIP Code: 15301
- Area code: 724

Wolfdale is a census-designated place (CDP) in Canton Township, Washington County, Pennsylvania, United States. The population was 2,888 at the 2010 census.

== Geography ==
Wolfdale is located at 40°11′45″N 80°17′35″W (40.195791, -80.292919).

According to the U.S. Census Bureau, Wolfdale has a total area of 2.4 square miles (6.2 km^{2}), all of which is land.

== Demographics ==
=== 2020 census ===
As of the 2020 census, Wolfdale had a population of 3,055. The median age was 49.3 years. 16.4% of residents were under the age of 18 and 25.8% were 65 years of age or older. For every 100 females, there were 90.2 males, and for every 100 females age 18 and over there were 87.5 males age 18 and over.

100.0% of residents lived in urban areas, while 0.0% lived in rural areas.

There were 1,391 households, of which 22.9% had children under the age of 18 living in them. Of all households, 46.6% were married-couple households, 17.5% were households with a male householder and no spouse or partner present, and 29.4% were households with a female householder and no spouse or partner present. About 29.8% of all households were made up of individuals and 16.1% had someone living alone who was 65 years of age or older.

There were 1,468 housing units, of which 5.2% were vacant. The homeowner vacancy rate was 2.2% and the rental vacancy rate was 6.6%.

Racial composition as of the 2020 census
Race	Number	Percent
White	2,879	94.2%
Black or African American	25	0.8%
American Indian and Alaska Native	5	0.2%
Asian	2	0.1%
Native Hawaiian and Other Pacific Islander	0	0.0%
Some other race	21	0.7%
Two or more races	123	4.0%
Hispanic or Latino (of any race)	36	1.2%

=== 2000 census ===
At the 2000 census there were 2,873 people, 1,217 households, and 837 families living in the CDP. The population density was 1,202.9 inhabitants per square mile (464.4/km^{2}). There were 1,267 housing units at an average density of 530.5 per square mile (204.8/km^{2}). The racial makeup of the CDP was 97.35% White, 1.18% African American, 0.10% Native American, 0.14% Asian, 0.07% from other races, and 1.15% from two or more races. Hispanic or Latino of any race were 0.52%.

Of the 1,217 households 26.0% had children under the age of 18 living with them, 54.6% were married couples living together, 11.0% had a female householder with no husband present, and 31.2% were non-families. 27.4% of households were one person and 11.3% were one person aged 65 or older. The average household size was 2.35 and the average family size was 2.86.

The age distribution was 20.2% under the age of 18, 7.2% from 18 to 24, 28.2% from 25 to 44, 27.1% from 45 to 64, and 17.4% 65 or older. The median age was 42 years. For every 100 females, there were 85.6 males. For every 100 females age 18 and over, there were 84.4 males.

The median household income was $32,257 and the median family income was $37,772. Males had a median income of $33,222 versus $22,264 for females. The per capita income for the CDP was $15,676. About 4.4% of families and 8.7% of the population were below the poverty line, including 9.3% of those under age 18 and 3.4% of those age 65 or over.

== Education ==
It is in the Trinity Area School District.
