= Cross Creek, Pennsylvania =

Unincorporated community in Pennsylvania, US

Coordinates: 40°19′40″N 80°24′24″W

- census-designated place
- Interactive map of Cross Creek, Pennsylvania
- Country: United States
- State: Pennsylvania
- County: Washington

Area
  - Total: 0.36 sq mi (0.94 km^{2})
  - Land: 0.36 sq mi (0.94 km^{2})
  - Water: 0 sq mi (0.00 km^{2})

Population (2020)
  - Total: 121
  - Density: 333.2/sq mi (128.66/km^{2})
- Time zone: UTC-5 (Eastern (EST))
  - Summer (DST): UTC-4 (EDT)
- FIPS code: 42-17320

Cross Creek is a census-designated place located in Cross Creek Township, Washington County in the state of Pennsylvania. The community is located in northern Washington County about 2 miles southwest of the community of Atlasburg. As of the 2010 census the population was 137 residents.

Historical population
| Census | Pop. | Note | %± |
|---|---|---|---|
| 2010 | 137 | | — |
| 2020 | 121 | | −11.7% |
U.S. Decennial Census

== Education ==
It is in the Avella Area School District.
