= Baidland, Pennsylvania =

Unincorporated community in Pennsylvania, US

Baidland
- Census-designated place
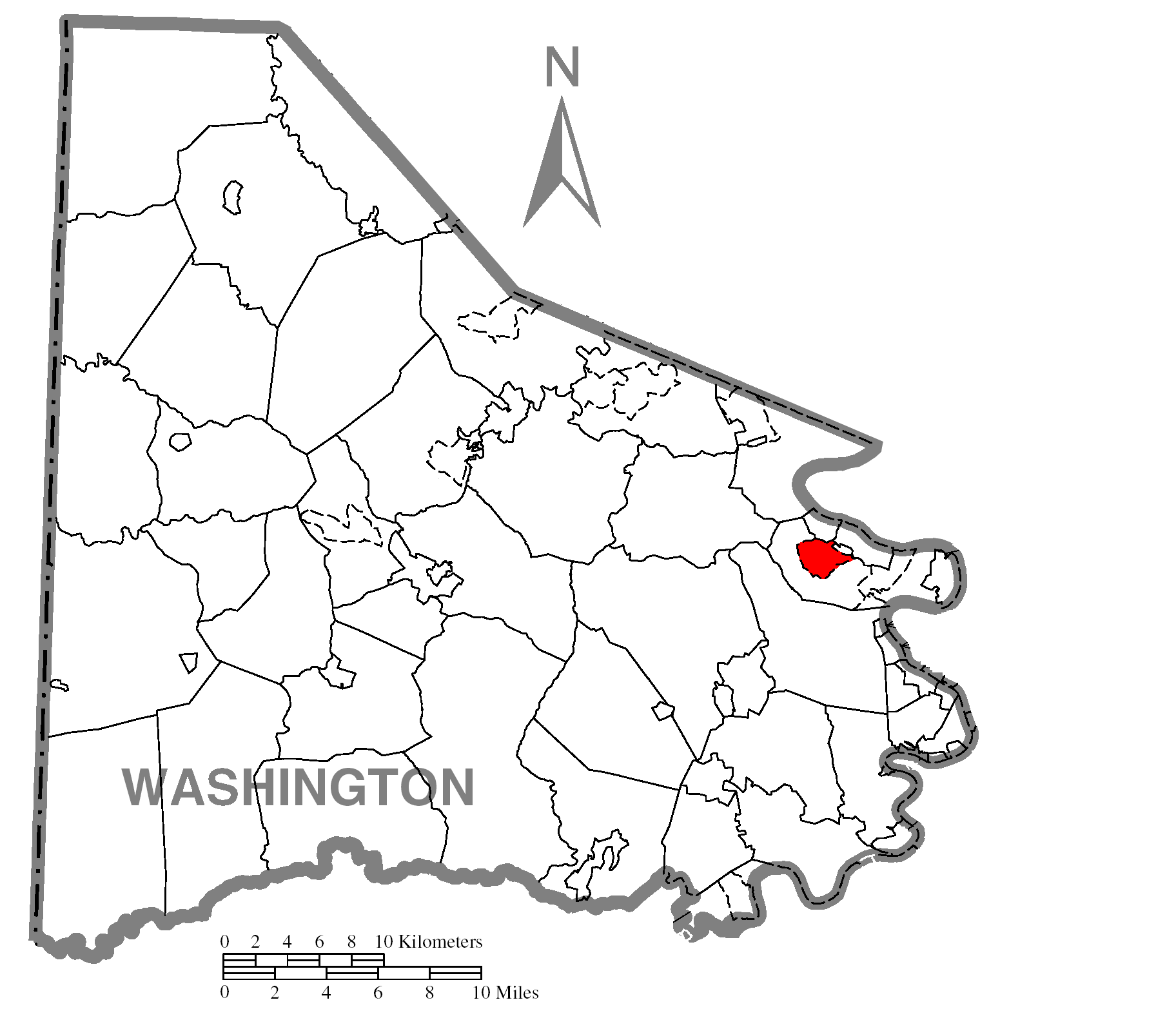
- Location of Baidland in Washington County
- Coordinates: 40°11′26″N 79°57′19″W
- Country: United States
- State: Pennsylvania
- County: Washington

Area
  - Total: 2.14 sq mi (5.55 km^{2})
  - Land: 2.14 sq mi (5.55 km^{2})
  - Water: 0 sq mi (0.00 km^{2})

Population (2020)
  - Total: 1,509
  - Density: 704.3/sq mi (271.92/km^{2})
- Time zone: UTC-4 (EST)
  - Summer (DST): UTC-5 (EDT)
- Area code: 724
- FIPS code: 42-03768

Baidland is a census-designated place (CDP) in Carroll Township, Washington County, Pennsylvania, United States. As of the 2020 census, Baidland had a population of 1,509.

== Geography ==
Baidland is located at 40°11′26″N 79°57′19″W (40.190671, -79.955263).

According to the United States Census Bureau, the CDP has a total area of 2.0 square miles (5.2 km^{2}), all of it land.

== Demographics ==
Historical population
Census	Pop.	Note	%±
2020	1,509		—
U.S. Decennial Census

At the 2000 census there were 1,576 people, 642 households, and 487 families living in the CDP. The population density was 800.1 inhabitants per square mile (308.9/km^{2}). There were 659 housing units at an average density of 334.6 per square mile (129.2/km^{2}). The racial makeup of the CDP was 99.62% White, 0.19% African American, 0.06% Asian, and 0.13% from two or more races. Hispanic or Latino of any race were 0.95%.

Of the 642 households 25.2% had children under the age of 18 living with them, 67.4% were married couples living together, 6.1% had a female householder with no husband present, and 24.1% were non-families. 21.8% of households were one person and 13.1% were one person aged 65 or older. The average household size was 2.45 and the average family size was 2.85.

The age distribution was 19.2% under the age of 18, 4.8% from 18 to 24, 25.1% from 25 to 44, 27.2% from 45 to 64, and 23.6% 65 or older. The median age was 46 years. For every 100 females, there were 94.6 males. For every 100 females age 18 and over, there were 94.6 males.

The median household income was $40,481 and the median family income was $52,906. Males had a median income of $41,875 versus $25,625 for females. The per capita income for the CDP was $20,338. About 2.3% of families and 1.7% of the population were below the poverty line, including none of those under age 18 and 2.9% of those age 65 or over.

== Education ==
It is in the Ringgold School District.
