= Peters Township =

Peters Township may refer to:

== Canada ==
- Peters Township, a geographic township of Sudbury District, Ontario

== United States ==
- Peters Township, Kingman County, Kansas
- Peters Township, Franklin County, Pennsylvania
- Peters Township, Washington County, Pennsylvania
  - Peters Township School District
  - Peters Township High School
