= Canton Township, Pennsylvania =

Canton Township is the name of some places in the U.S. state of Pennsylvania:

- Canton Township, Bradford County, Pennsylvania
- Canton Township, Washington County, Pennsylvania
