= Wickerham Manor-Fisher, Pennsylvania =

Unincorporated community in Pennsylvania, US

Wickerham Manor-Fisher
- Census-designated place
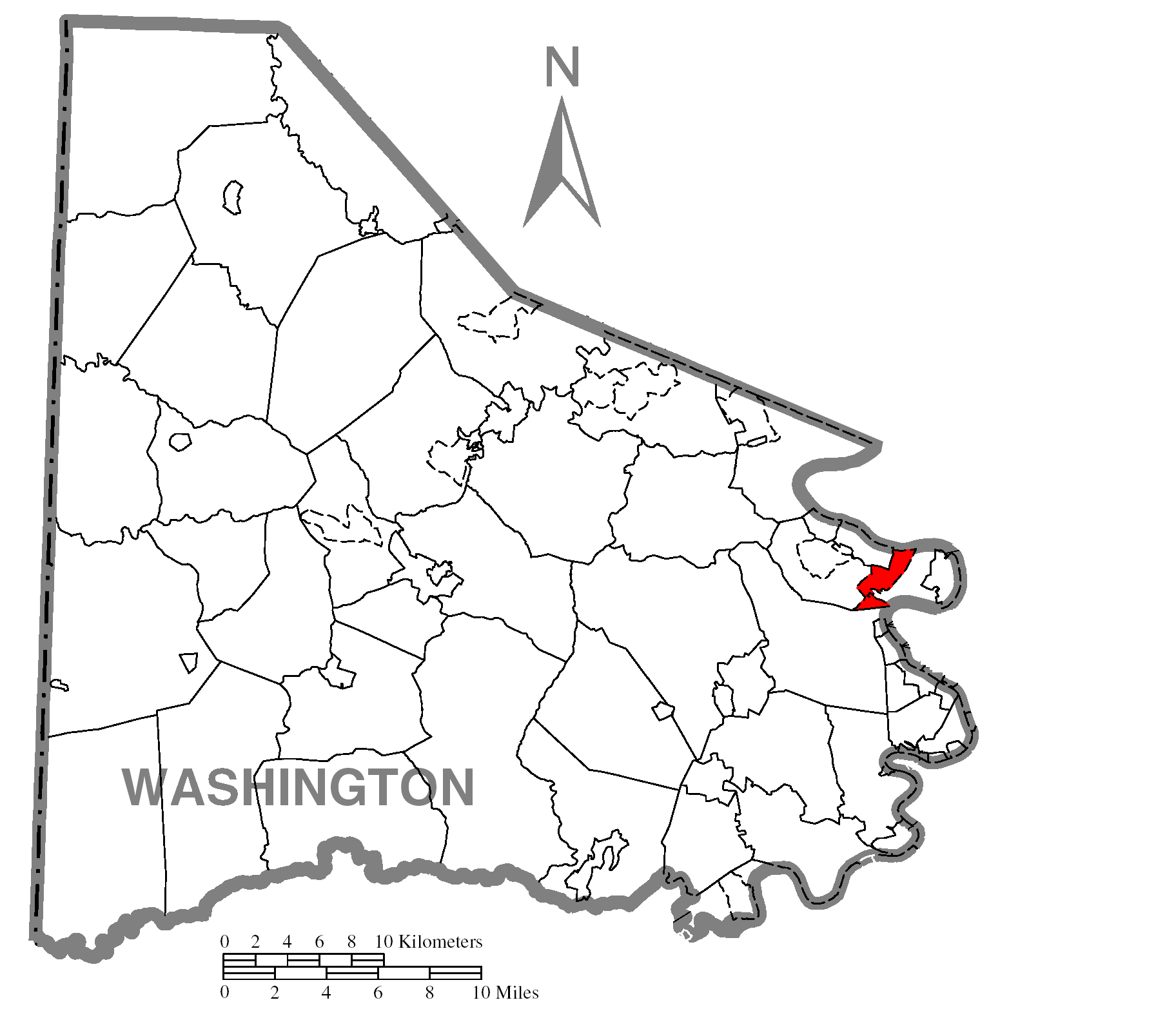
- Location of Wickerham Manor-Fisher in Washington County
- Coordinates: 40°10′31″N 79°54′16″W
- Country: United States
- State: Pennsylvania
- County: Washington

Area
  - Total: 2.2 sq mi (5.7 km^{2})

Population (2010)
  - Total: 1,728
  - Density: 790/sq mi (300/km^{2})
- Time zone: UTC-4 (EST)
  - Summer (DST): UTC-5 (EDT)
- Area code: 724

Wickerham Manor-Fisher is a census-designated place (CDP) in Carroll Township, Washington County, Pennsylvania, United States. The population was 1,728 at the 2010 census.

== Geography ==
Wickerham Manor-Fisher is located at 40°10′31″N 79°54′16″W (40.175160, -79.904484).

According to the United States Census Bureau, the CDP has a total area of 2.2 square miles (5.7 km^{2}), all of it land.

== Demographics ==
At the 2000 census there were 1,783 people, 698 households, and 526 families living in the CDP. The population density was 828.4 inhabitants per square mile (319.8/km^{2}). There were 723 housing units at an average density of 335.9 per square mile (129.7/km^{2}). The racial makeup of the CDP was 97.31% White, 1.35% African American, 0.22% Asian, 0.17% Pacific Islander, 0.62% from other races, and 0.34% from two or more races. Hispanic or Latino of any race were 0.34%.

Of the 698 households 23.9% had children under the age of 18 living with them, 63.9% were married couples living together, 7.2% had a female householder with no husband present, and 24.6% were non-families. 22.3% of households were one person and 15.9% were one person aged 65 or older. The average household size was 2.39 and the average family size was 2.79.

The age distribution was 17.6% under the age of 18, 3.8% from 18 to 24, 20.6% from 25 to 44, 25.8% from 45 to 64, and 32.2% 65 or older. The median age was 50 years. For every 100 females, there were 86.9 males. For every 100 females age 18 and over, there were 82.4 males.

The median household income was $45,263 and the median family income was $54,250. Males had a median income of $37,202 versus $26,576 for females. The per capita income for the CDP was $23,781. About 4.1% of families and 7.3% of the population were below the poverty line, including none of those under age 18 and 11.4% of those age 65 or over.

== Education ==
It is in the Ringgold School District.
