= Bulger, Pennsylvania =

Unincorporated community in Pennsylvania, US

Bulger
- Census-designated place
- Location within the U.S. state of Pennsylvania Bulger (the United States)
- Coordinates: 40°22′42″N 80°19′40″W
- Country: United States
- State: Pennsylvania
- County: Washington

Area
  - Total: 1.44 sq mi (3.72 km^{2})
  - Land: 1.44 sq mi (3.72 km^{2})
  - Water: 0 sq mi (0.00 km^{2})

Population (2020)
  - Total: 379
  - Density: 263.6/sq mi (101.78/km^{2})
- Time zone: UTC-5 (Eastern (EST))
  - Summer (DST): UTC-4 (EDT)
- ZIP codes: 15019
- FIPS code: 42-10128

Bulger is a census-designated place in Smith Township, Pennsylvania. A suburb of Pittsburgh, Bulger's 2020 census population was 379 residents.

== History ==
The town was originally known as Reynolds. In years gone by the Pittsburgh Coal Company, Bulger Block Coal Company, and Verner Coal & Coke Company operated in or near Bulger.

== Education ==
It is in the Burgettstown Area School District.

== Infrastructure ==
=== Roads ===
Bulger is bisected by Pennsylvania State Route 4009, itself acting as the Main Street. Pennsylvania Route 576 contains an exit which serves Bulger and nearby communities via Beech Hollow Road.

=== Airports ===
Bulger's nearest airport is Pittsburgh International Airport, though general aviators also can use Allegheny County Airport.

Historical population
Census	Pop.	Note	%±
2010	407		—
2020	379		−6.9%
U.S. Decennial Census

=== Rail trail ===
It is on the pathway of the Panhandle Trail, which runs from the Weirton, West Virginia area to the Rennerdale, Pennsylvania area.

== Environment ==
Researchers claim that leakage from a landfill in Bulger has polluted local groundwater sources. The damage is attributed to hazardous wastes generated by the iron, steel, glass manufacturing, electroplating and metal finishing industries, as well as drilling for natural gas and oil ("fracking").

== Notable people ==
Doug Russell, an American football player, was born in Bulger in 1911.
