= Joffre, Pennsylvania =

Unincorporated community in Pennsylvania, US

Coordinates: 40°22′49″N 80°21′36″W

- census-designated place
- Interactive map of Joffre, Pennsylvania
- Country: United States
- State: Pennsylvania
- County: Washington

Area
  - Total: 0.90 sq mi (2.32 km^{2})
  - Land: 0.90 sq mi (2.32 km^{2})
  - Water: 0 sq mi (0.00 km^{2})

Population (2020)
  - Total: 485
  - Density: 540.9/sq mi (208.86/km^{2})
- Time zone: UTC-5 (Eastern (EST))
  - Summer (DST): UTC-4 (EDT)
- FIPS code: 42-38240

Joffre is a census-designated place located in Smith Township, Washington County in the state of Pennsylvania. The community is located in northern Washington County about 3 miles east of the borough of Burgettstown. As of the 2022 American Community Survey, the population was 397 residents.

== Demographics ==
Historical population
| Census | Pop. | Note | %± |
|---|---|---|---|
| 2010 | 536 | | — |
| 2020 | 485 | | −9.5% |
U.S. Decennial Census

== Education ==
It is in the Burgettstown Area School District.
