= Slovan =

Slovan, meaning "Slav" or Slavic in English, may refer to one of the following sports teams:

- FC Slovan Liberec, Czech football club
- HC Slovan Ústečtí Lvi, Czech ice-hockey club
- ŠK Slovan Bratislava, Slovak football club
- HC Slovan Bratislava, Slovak ice-hockey club
- FK Slovan Duslo Šaľa, slovak football club
- KD Slovan, Slovenian basketball club
- ND Slovan, Slovenian football club
- RD Slovan, Slovenian handball club
- SK Slovan HAC, Austrian football club

Slovan may also refer to:

- Slovan, Pennsylvania, a village in Washington County, Pennsylvania, United States
- Slovan, Wisconsin, an unincorporated community, United States
