= Langeloth, Pennsylvania =

Unincorporated community in Pennsylvania, US

- Census-designated place
- Location within the U.S. state of Pennsylvania Langeloth, Pennsylvania (the United States)
- Coordinates: 40°21′48″N 80°24′37″W
- Country: United States
- State: Pennsylvania
- County: Washington

Area
  - Total: 1.04 sq mi (2.70 km^{2})
  - Land: 1.04 sq mi (2.70 km^{2})
  - Water: 0 sq mi (0.00 km^{2})

Population (2020)
  - Total: 659
  - Density: 633.1/sq mi (244.44/km^{2})
- Time zone: UTC-5 (Eastern (EST))
  - Summer (DST): UTC-4 (EDT)
- ZIP codes: 15054
- FIPS code: 42-41376

Langeloth is a census-designated place in Smith Township, Washington County, Pennsylvania. Langeloth has been assigned the ZIP code 15054. As of the 2010 census, the population was 717 residents.

Langeloth began as a coal mining company town. Langeloth Metallurgical Company, now a unit of Centerra Gold, is the town's largest employer. It was the birthplace of noted former college football coach Barry Alvarez.

Historical population
Census	Pop.	Note	%±
2010	717		—
2020	659		−8.1%
U.S. Decennial Census

== Education ==
It is in the Burgettstown Area School District.
