= Bobby Jones (basketball, born 1962) =

American basketball coach (born 1962)

Biographical details
- Born: January 9, 1962 (age 64); Macon, Georgia, U.S.

Playing career
- 1980–1984: Western Kentucky
- Position: Guard

Coaching career (HC unless noted)
- 1991–1992: Middle Tennessee (assistant)
- 1992–1994: Western Kentucky (assistant)
- 1994–1997: Pittsburgh (assistant)
- 1997–1999: Minnesota (assistant)
- 1999–2008: St. Francis (PA)

Administrative career (AD unless noted)
- 2010–2017: Trinity Area School District (PA)

Bobby Jones (born January 9, 1962) is an American former college basketball coach. He was the men's head coach at Saint Francis University. Jones resigned after the 2008 season, his ninth with the school.

After being named high school Player of the Year in Georgia, Jones joined Western Kentucky in 1980, playing there through the 1983–84 season; as of 2009, he ranks third all-time for the university in assists. Prior to his hiring at St. Francis, he was an assistant or associate coach from 1991 to 1999 at four schools: Middle Tennessee State, Western Kentucky, Pittsburgh, and Minnesota. St. Francis had an 85–167 record while Jones was the head coach.

After leaving St. Francis, Jones worked as a scout. He was later the athletic director of the Trinity Area School District in Washington, Pennsylvania, from 2010 through 2017.
