= Atlasburg, Pennsylvania =

Unincorporated community in Pennsylvania, US

- census-designated place
- Location within Pennsylvania Location within the United States
- Coordinates: 40°20′29″N 80°22′56″W
- Country: United States
- State: Pennsylvania
- County: Washington

Area
  - Total: 0.68 sq mi (1.75 km^{2})
  - Land: 0.68 sq mi (1.75 km^{2})
  - Water: 0 sq mi (0.00 km^{2})

Population (2020)
  - Total: 351
  - Density: 520.4/sq mi (200.93/km^{2})
- Time zone: UTC-5 (Eastern (EST))
  - Summer (DST): UTC-4 (EDT)
- ZIP code: 15004
- Area code: 724
- FIPS code: 42-03472

Atlasburg is a census-designated place located in Smith Township, Washington County in the state of Pennsylvania. The community is located in northern Washington County along Pennsylvania Route 18 about 5 miles south of the borough of Burgettstown. As of the 2020 census, Atlasburg had a population of 351.

== Demographics ==
Historical population
Census	Pop.	Note	%±
2010	401		—
2020	351		−12.5%
U.S. Decennial Census

== Education ==
It is in the Burgettstown Area School District.
