= Washington County, Pennsylvania =

County in Pennsylvania, United States

- County
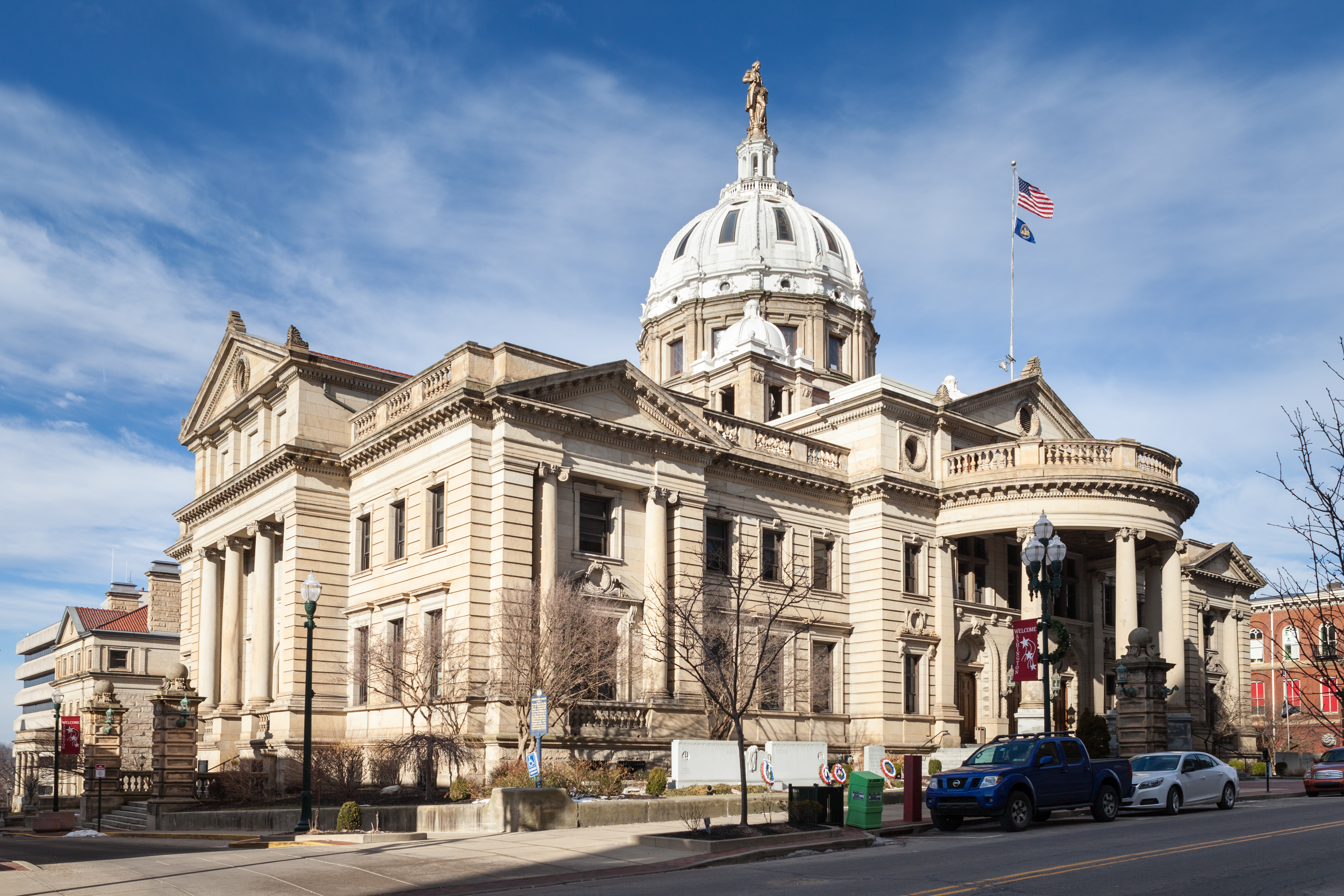
- Washington County Courthouse

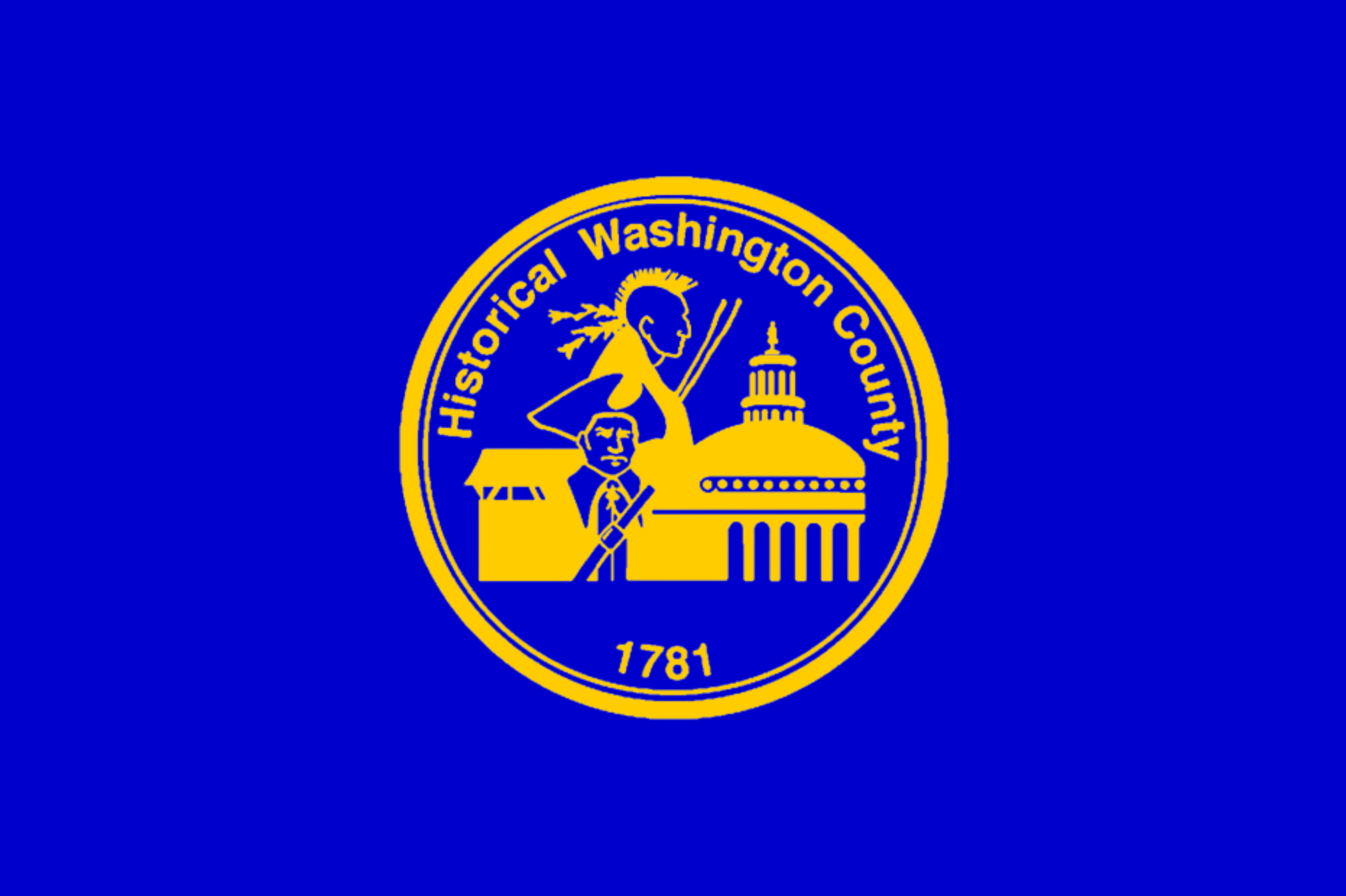
- Flag Logo

- Location within the U.S. state of Pennsylvania
- Coordinates: 40.19°N 80.25°W
- Country: United States
- State: Pennsylvania
- Founded: March 28, 1781
- Named for: George Washington
- Seat: Washington
- Largest city: Peters Township

Government
  - Chairman of the Board of Commissioners: Nick Sherman (R)

Area
  - Total: 861 sq mi (2,230 km^{2})
  - Land: 857 sq mi (2,220 km^{2})
  - Water: 3.9 sq mi (10 km^{2}) 0.5%

Population (2020)
  - Total: 209,349
  - Estimate (2025): 210,802 ▲
  - Density: 240/sq mi (93/km^{2})
- Time zone: UTC−5 (Eastern)
  - Summer (DST): UTC−4 (EDT)
- Congressional district: 14th
- Website: washingtoncopa.gov

Washington County is a county in Pennsylvania, United States. As of the 2020 census, the population was 209,349. Its county seat is Washington. The county is home to Washington County Airport, three miles (4.8 km) southwest of Washington. The county is part of the Pittsburgh region of the commonwealth. (Note: Includes Allegheny, Washington, Butler, Beaver, Lawrence and Armstrong Counties) Southpointe is the regions largest business park with over 800 acres of office buildings, manufacturing, hotels, restaurants and a championship golf course. The park is home to corporations Ansys, Viatris, Range Resources, Lighthouse Electric, EQT, Core Natural Resources and Centimark. The current county commissioners are Nick Sherman, Electra Janis and Lawrence Maggi.

== History ==
The county was created on March 28, 1781, from part of Westmoreland County. The city and county were both named after American Revolutionary War leader George Washington, who eventually became the first President of the United States. The town of Charleroi got its name from the Belgian city of Charleroi. There lived many Belgian immigrants in the Monongahela area at the end of the 19th century, some of whom were glass makers.

== Geography ==
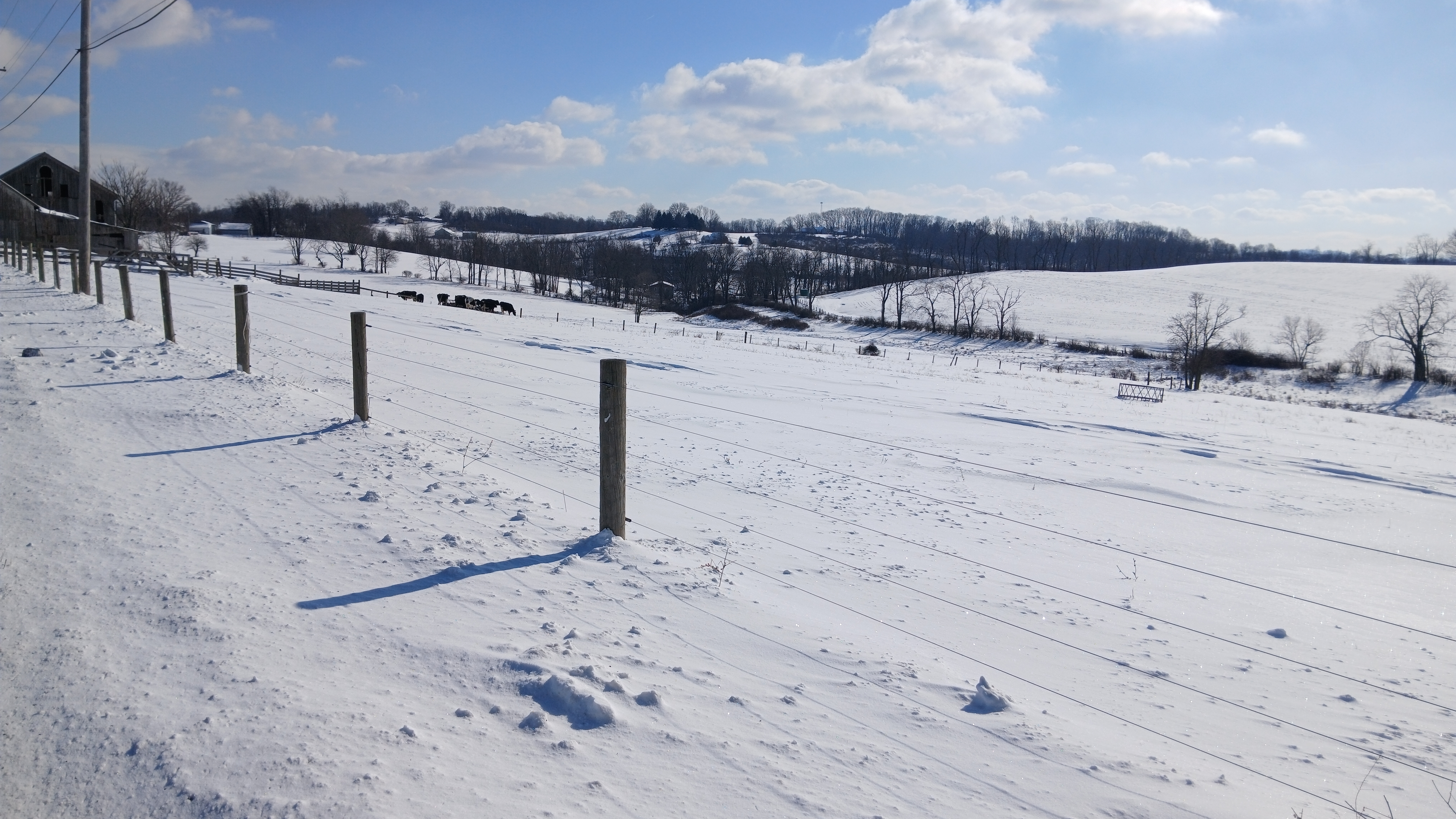
Rolling farmland east of Washington, Pennsylvania, after a winter storm

According to the U.S. Census Bureau, the county has a total area of 861 square miles (2,230 km^{2}), of which 857 square miles (2,220 km^{2}) is land and 3.9 square miles (10 km^{2}) (0.5%) is water. Washington County is one of the 423 counties served by the Appalachian Regional Commission, and it is identified as part of "Greater Appalachia" by Colin Woodard in his book American Nations: A History of the Eleven Rival Regional Cultures of North America.

=== Surrounding counties ===
- Beaver County (north)
- Allegheny County (northeast)
- Westmoreland County (east)
- Fayette County (southeast)
- Greene County (south)
- Marshall County, West Virginia (southwest)
- Ohio County, West Virginia (west)
- Brooke County, West Virginia (west)
- Hancock County, West Virginia (northwest)

=== Major highways ===
- I-70
- I-79
- US 19
- US 22
- US 40
- PA 18
- PA Turnpike 43
- PA 50
- PA 88
- PA 88 Truck
- PA 136
- PA 221
- PA 231
- PA 331
- PA 481
- PA 519
- PA Turnpike 576
- PA 837
- PA 844
- PA 917
- PA 980

== Flag ==
=== Design ===
The flag of Washington County, Pennsylvania consists of a light blue background with the county's seal in the middle. The seal consists of the county courthouse, a covered bridge, an Indigenous American, and an early settler. This montage has the words "Historical Washington County" and "1781" inside a circle.

== Climate ==
Washington County has a hot-summer humid continental climate (Köppen Dfa), with hot, humid summers and cold, snowy winters. Precipitation is highest in the summer months, with an annual average of 38.87 in (987 mm). Snow usually falls between November and April, with an average of 37.8 in (96 cm).

Climate data for Washington, Pennsylvania (3mi NE) (1991–2020 normals, extremes 1975–present)
Month	Jan	Feb	Mar	Apr	May	Jun	Jul	Aug	Sep	Oct	Nov	Dec	Year
Record high °F (°C)	70 (21)	75 (24)	82 (28)	90 (32)	94 (34)	93 (34)	100 (38)	96 (36)	95 (35)	87 (31)	80 (27)	76 (24)	100 (38)
Mean daily maximum °F (°C)	36.8 (2.7)	39.7 (4.3)	49.1 (9.5)	62.1 (16.7)	71.6 (22.0)	79.2 (26.2)	83.0 (28.3)	82.0 (27.8)	75.8 (24.3)	63.8 (17.7)	51.6 (10.9)	41.2 (5.1)	61.3 (16.3)
Daily mean °F (°C)	28.6 (−1.9)	30.7 (−0.7)	38.9 (3.8)	50.6 (10.3)	60.4 (15.8)	68.4 (20.2)	72.4 (22.4)	71.2 (21.8)	64.6 (18.1)	53.0 (11.7)	42.1 (5.6)	33.4 (0.8)	51.2 (10.7)
Mean daily minimum °F (°C)	20.3 (−6.5)	21.7 (−5.7)	28.6 (−1.9)	39.1 (3.9)	49.2 (9.6)	57.7 (14.3)	61.8 (16.6)	60.3 (15.7)	53.5 (11.9)	42.1 (5.6)	32.7 (0.4)	25.6 (−3.6)	41.1 (5.1)
Record low °F (°C)	−25 (−32)	−20 (−29)	−1 (−18)	9 (−13)	20 (−7)	32 (0)	38 (3)	29 (−2)	30 (−1)	18 (−8)	−4 (−20)	−16 (−27)	−25 (−32)
Average precipitation inches (mm)	2.87 (73)	2.47 (63)	3.25 (83)	3.11 (79)	4.16 (106)	3.91 (99)	3.94 (100)	3.19 (81)	3.28 (83)	2.46 (62)	3.37 (86)	2.97 (75)	38.87 (987)
Average snowfall inches (cm)	10.5 (27)	9.3 (24)	6.6 (17)	1.2 (3.0)	0 (0)	0 (0)	0 (0)	0 (0)	0 (0)	0.2 (0.51)	2.1 (5.3)	7.9 (20)	37.8 (96)
Average precipitation days (≥ 0.01 in)	16	14	14	14	15	12	12	11	11	13	14	15	162
Average snowy days (≥ 0.1 in)	12	10	5	1	0	0	0	0	0	0	3	8	38
Source 1: NOAA
Source 2: PRISM

== Demographics ==
Historical population
Census	Pop.	Note	%±
1790	23,892		—
1800	28,298		18.4%
1810	36,289		28.2%
1820	40,038		10.3%
1830	42,784		6.9%
1840	41,279		−3.5%
1850	44,939		8.9%
1860	46,805		4.2%
1870	48,483		3.6%
1880	55,418		14.3%
1890	71,155		28.4%
1900	92,181		29.5%
1910	143,680		55.9%
1920	188,992		31.5%
1930	204,802		8.4%
1940	210,852		3.0%
1950	209,628		−0.6%
1960	217,271		3.6%
1970	210,876		−2.9%
1980	217,074		2.9%
1990	204,584		−5.8%
2000	202,897		−0.8%
2010	207,820		2.4%
2020	209,349		0.7%
2025 (est.)	210,802	▲	0.7%
U.S. Decennial Census; 1790–1960 1900–1990; 1990–2000 2010–2019 2010-2020

=== Racial and ethnic composition ===
Washington County, Pennsylvania – Racial and ethnic composition Note: the US Census treats Hispanic/Latino as an ethnic category. This table excludes Latinos from the racial categories and assigns them to a separate category. Hispanics/Latinos may be of any race.
Race / Ethnicity (NH = Non-Hispanic)	Pop 1980	Pop 1990	Pop 2000	Pop 2010	Pop 2020	% 1980	% 1990	% 2000	% 2010	% 2020
White alone (NH)	207,477	195,820	192,511	194,171	186,900	95.58%	95.72%	94.88%	93.43%	89.28%
Black or African American alone (NH)	7,494	6,754	6,554	6,650	6,861	3.45%	3.30%	3.23%	3.20%	3.28%
Native American or Alaska Native alone (NH)	138	189	162	214	230	0.06%	0.09%	0.08%	0.10%	0.11%
Asian alone (NH)	377	519	711	1,313	1,998	0.17%	0.25%	0.35%	0.63%	0.95%
Native Hawaiian or Pacific Islander alone (NH)	x	x	35	28	63	x	x	0.02%	0.01%	0.03%
Other race alone (NH)	224	116	226	178	620	0.10%	0.06%	0.11%	0.09%	0.30%
Mixed race or Multiracial (NH)	x	x	1,528	2,900	8,656	x	x	0.75%	1.40%	4.13%
Hispanic or Latino (any race)	1,364	1,186	1,170	2,366	4,021	0.63%	0.58%	0.58%	1.14%	1.92%
Total	217,074	204,584	202,897	207,820	209,349	100.00%	100.00%	100.00%	100.00%	100.00%

=== 2020 census ===
As of the 2020 census, the county had a population of 209,349. The median age was 45.1 years. 19.2% of residents were under the age of 18 and 21.6% of residents were 65 years of age or older. For every 100 females there were 96.7 males, and for every 100 females age 18 and over there were 94.9 males age 18 and over.

67.7% of residents lived in urban areas, while 32.3% lived in rural areas.

There were 87,688 households in the county, of which 25.3% had children under the age of 18 living in them. Of all households, 49.0% were married-couple households, 18.6% were households with a male householder and no spouse or partner present, and 25.7% were households with a female householder and no spouse or partner present. About 30.0% of all households were made up of individuals and 14.0% had someone living alone who was 65 years of age or older.

There were 96,791 housing units, of which 9.4% were vacant. Among occupied housing units, 75.2% were owner-occupied and 24.8% were renter-occupied. The homeowner vacancy rate was 1.6% and the rental vacancy rate was 10.1%.

== Government and politics ==
United States presidential election results for Washington County, Pennsylvania
Year	Republican		Democratic		Third party(ies)	
Year	No.	%	No.	%	No.	%
1880	6,451	51.04%	5,850	46.29%	338	2.67%
1884	6,699	50.21%	5,849	43.84%	793	5.94%
1888	7,801	54.83%	5,847	41.10%	579	4.07%
1892	8,060	51.24%	6,847	43.53%	822	5.23%
1896	10,798	57.93%	7,384	39.61%	458	2.46%
1900	10,408	59.40%	6,380	36.41%	733	4.18%
1904	11,530	66.01%	4,886	27.97%	1,051	6.02%
1908	11,430	56.31%	7,018	34.57%	1,850	9.11%
1912	4,297	22.98%	5,563	29.75%	8,837	47.26%
1916	10,367	52.39%	7,747	39.15%	1,674	8.46%
1920	18,514	62.49%	8,827	29.80%	2,284	7.71%
1924	22,315	60.64%	6,706	18.22%	7,776	21.13%
1928	31,099	63.61%	17,149	35.07%	645	1.32%
1932	21,447	40.82%	28,934	55.07%	2,155	4.10%
1936	23,342	30.25%	52,878	68.52%	948	1.23%
1940	29,026	36.21%	50,829	63.42%	296	0.37%
1944	27,615	37.30%	46,023	62.17%	392	0.53%
1948	26,860	35.73%	46,327	61.63%	1,979	2.63%
1952	36,041	39.16%	55,725	60.55%	270	0.29%
1956	39,465	45.04%	48,052	54.84%	98	0.11%
1960	38,348	41.59%	53,729	58.28%	120	0.13%
1964	24,127	27.49%	63,482	72.34%	147	0.17%
1968	28,023	32.98%	47,805	56.26%	9,140	10.76%
1972	42,587	54.00%	34,781	44.10%	1,494	1.89%
1976	32,827	39.43%	49,317	59.24%	1,107	1.33%
1980	32,532	39.66%	45,295	55.23%	4,191	5.11%
1984	34,782	40.47%	50,911	59.24%	244	0.28%
1988	28,651	37.43%	47,527	62.08%	375	0.49%
1992	21,977	26.05%	46,143	54.70%	16,244	19.25%
1996	27,777	35.73%	40,952	52.67%	9,016	11.60%
2000	37,339	44.22%	44,961	53.25%	2,141	2.54%
2004	47,673	49.57%	48,225	50.14%	279	0.29%
2008	50,752	51.52%	46,122	46.82%	1,642	1.67%
2012	53,230	56.04%	40,345	42.48%	1,403	1.48%
2016	61,386	60.03%	36,322	35.52%	4,559	4.46%
2020	72,080	60.70%	45,088	37.97%	1,588	1.34%
2024	75,929	62.26%	44,910	36.82%	1,117	0.92%

United States Senate election results for Washington County, Pennsylvania1
Year	Republican		Democratic		Third party(ies)	
Year	No.	%	No.	%	No.	%
1994	28,726	43.52%	34,618	52.45%	2,655	4.02%
2000	36,908	44.26%	42,934	51.49%	3,542	4.25%
2006	29,417	40.58%	43,067	59.42%	0	0.00%
2012	48,047	51.33%	43,711	46.70%	1,850	1.98%
2018	41,958	50.86%	39,220	47.54%	1,318	1.60%
2024	71,798	59.61%	45,926	38.13%	2,717	2.26%

United States Senate election results for Washington County, Pennsylvania3
Year	Republican		Democratic		Third party(ies)	
Year	No.	%	No.	%	No.	%
1992	36,739	44.02%	42,842	51.33%	3,876	4.64%
1998	29,289	56.62%	20,535	39.70%	1,903	3.68%
2004	45,864	49.07%	39,934	42.72%	7,674	8.21%
2010	37,957	54.50%	31,689	45.50%	0	0.00%
2016	56,952	56.44%	38,133	37.79%	5,824	5.77%
2022	52,337	55.77%	39,684	42.29%	1,815	1.93%

Pennsylvania Gubernatorial election results for Washington County
Year	Republican		Democratic		Third party(ies)	
Year	No.	%	No.	%	No.	%
1970	20,273	31.24%	42,982	66.23%	1,642	2.53%
1974	26,721	42.44%	35,330	56.12%	908	1.44%
1978	22,796	33.75%	44,491	65.88%	250	0.37%
1982	29,322	42.39%	39,398	56.96%	451	0.65%
1986	23,033	37.87%	37,308	61.34%	481	0.79%
1990	13,734	25.39%	40,354	74.61%	0	0.00%
1994	25,852	39.21%	30,856	46.80%	9,224	13.99%
1998	22,825	43.56%	20,050	38.27%	9,518	18.17%
2002	28,368	47.33%	30,368	50.67%	1,202	2.01%
2006	34,440	47.27%	38,422	52.73%	0	0.00%
2010	41,984	59.81%	28,211	40.19%	0	0.00%
2014	31,203	51.78%	29,058	48.22%	0	0.00%
2018	40,662	49.34%	39,898	48.41%	1,858	2.25%
2022	47,052	50.26%	45,030	48.10%	1,535	1.64%

The Democratic Party has been historically dominant in county-level politics and national politics between 1932 and 2004, only voting Republican for president in Richard Nixon's 1972 landslide victory over George McGovern. However, like much of Appalachian coal country, Washington has trended strongly Republican in recent years. In 2000, Democrat Al Gore won 53% of the vote and Republican George W. Bush won 44%. In 2004, Democrat John Kerry received 50.14% of the vote and Bush received 49.57% a difference of 552 votes. In 2008, Republican John McCain won 51% to Democrat Barack Obama's 46% and each of the three state row office winners carried Washington County.

=== Voter registration ===
As of January 8, 2024, there are 142,146 registered voters in Washington county. Registered Republicans have a plurality of 68,164 registered voters, compared to 56,044 registered Democrats, 13,943 registered non-affiliated voters, and 3,995 voters registered to other parties.

Chart of Voter Registration
1. Republican (48.0%)
2. Democratic (39.4%)
3. Independent (9.81%)
4. Third Party (2.81%)

Voter registration and party enrollment
Party	Number of voters	Percentage
Republican	68,164	47.95%
Democratic	56,044	39.42%
Independent	13,943	9.81%
Third Party	3,995	2.81%
Total	142,146	100%

=== County Commissioners ===
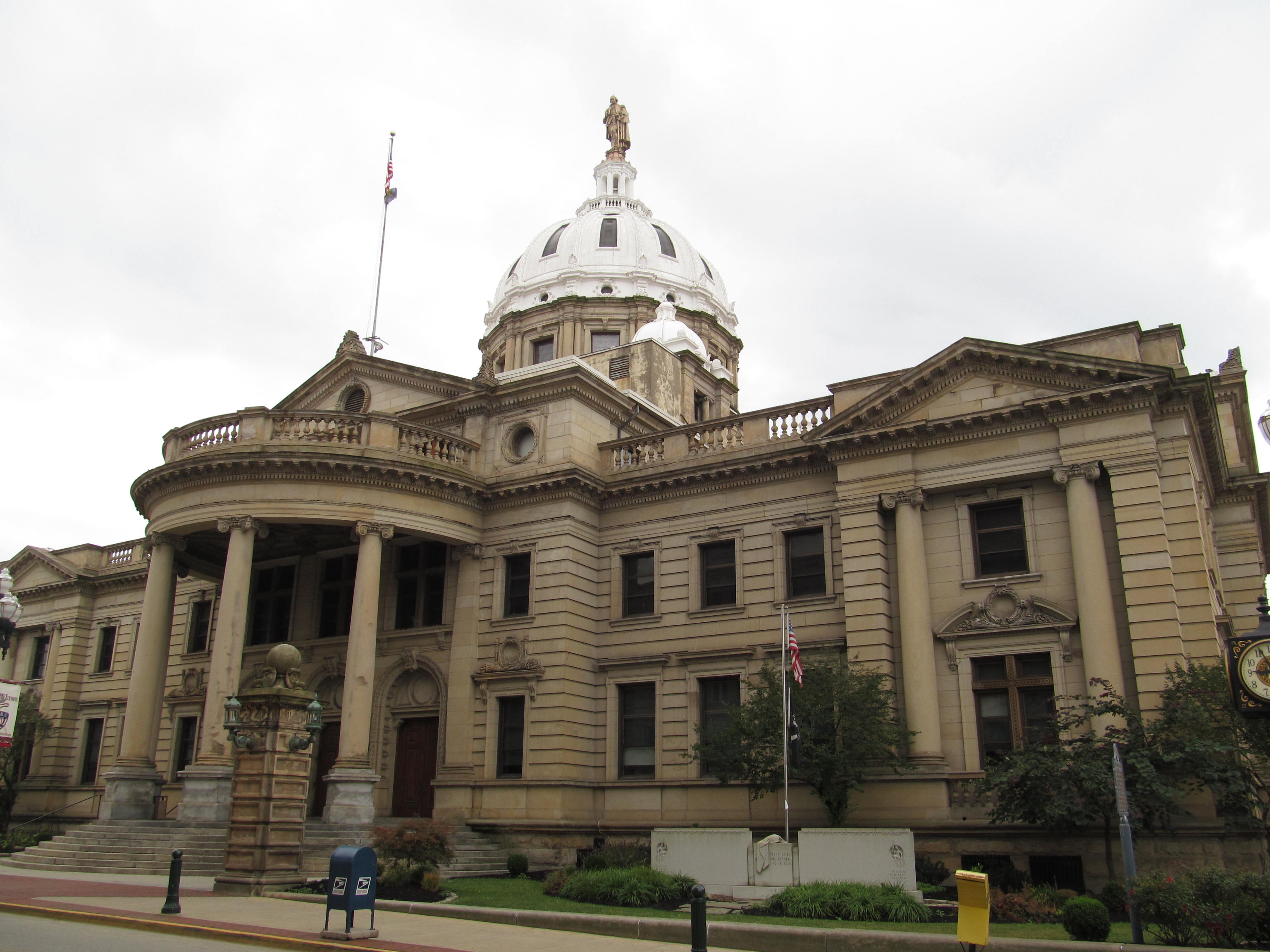
Washington County Courthouse

Washington County is administered by a three-member publicly elected commission. Each commissioner serves in four-year terms. Elections occur in the odd-numbered years that precede U.S. presidential elections. All three Commissioners are chosen in the same election, and voters may vote for no more than two of the candidates. By state law, the commission must have a minority party guaranteeing a political split on the commission. The Commissioners are responsible for the management of the fiscal and administrative functions of the county.

Commissioner	Party	Title
Nick Sherman	Republican	Chairman
Lawrence Maggi	Democratic	Commissioner
Electra S. Janis	Republican	Vice-Chair

Maggi was the Democratic nominee for Pennsylvania's 18th congressional district against Republican incumbent Tim Murphy in 2012. Maggi lost to Murphy and earned only 36 percent of the vote. Irey Vaughan was the Republican candidate for Pennsylvania's 12th congressional district and lost to the late Democratic incumbent John Murtha in the 2006 election.

On November 7, 2023, Nick Sherman and Lawrence Maggi were reelected as county commissioners. Electra Janis won her first term as county commissioner.

=== County row offices ===
Office	Official	Party
Clerk of Courts	Ray Phillips	Republican
Controller	Heather Sheatler	Republican
Coroner	Timothy Warco	Democratic
District Attorney	Jason M. Walsh	Republican
Prothonotary	Laura Hough	Republican
Recorder of Deeds	Carrie Perrell	Republican
Register of Wills	James Roman	Republican
Sheriff	Anthony Andronas	Republican
Treasurer	Tom Flickinger	Republican

=== State House of Representatives ===
District	Representative	Party
15	Josh Kail	Republican
39	Andrew Kuzma	Republican
40	Natalie Mihalek	Republican
46	Jason Ortitay	Republican
48	Timothy O'Neal	Republican
50	Bud Cook	Republican

=== State Senate ===
District	Senator	Party
46	Camera Bartolotta	Republican

=== United States House of Representatives ===
District	Representative	Party
14	Guy Reschenthaler	Republican

=== United States Senate ===
Senator	Party
John Fetterman	Democrat
Dave McCormick	Republican

== Industry ==
Core Natural Resources' Enlow Fork coal mine is located in Washington County.

== Landmarks and events ==
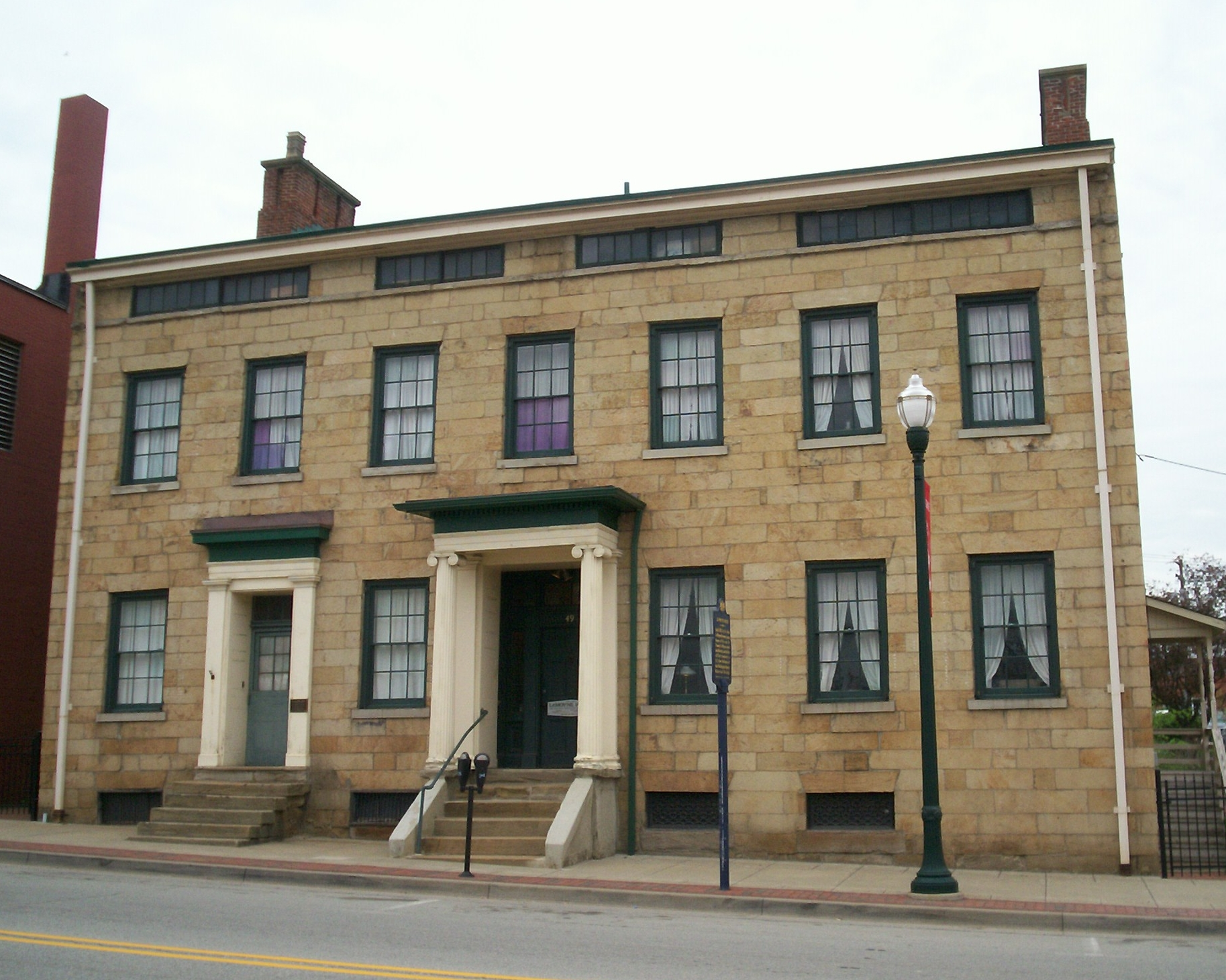
F. Julius LeMoyne House in Washington, headquarters of the Washington County Historical Society

Pony League baseball was founded in Washington County in 1951 for 13 and 14 year old boys and its headquarters are located here. As of 2016, more than a half-million youth in the U.S. and 40 other nations participate. The televised Pony League World Series held annually in August at Washington's Lew Hays Pony Field attracts teenage teams from around the world.

Washington County is home of the Pennsylvania Trolley Museum. The county is known for the Meadowcroft Rock Shelter at Meadowcroft Village, which are one of the best preserved and oldest Pre-Clovis Native American dwellings in the country. The county has 21 covered bridges still standing.

The Whiskey Rebellion culminated in Washington. The home of David Bradford, one of the rebellion leaders, is located in Washington and is a national landmark. Just a couple blocks away is the F. Julius LeMoyne House, which serves as the headquarters of the Washington County Historical Society.

Washington County is the home of the first crematory in the United States.

In 1981, the Pennsylvania Historical and Museum Commission installed a historical marker noting the historic importance of the county.

== Education ==
=== Colleges and universities ===
- Community College of Allegheny County Washington branch in North Franklin Township
- Pennsylvania Western University, California in California Borough
- Washington & Jefferson College in the City of Washington and East Washington Borough
- Waynesburg University - Southpointe Center Campus in Cecil Township.

=== Public school districts ===
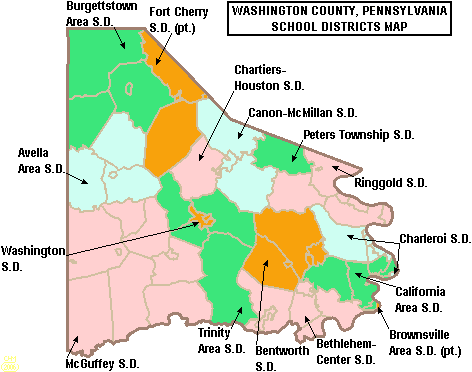
Map of Washington County, Pennsylvania School Districts

School districts include:

- Avella Area School District
- Bentworth School District
- Bethlehem-Center School District
- Brownsville Area School District (also in Fayette County)
- Burgettstown Area School District
- California Area School District
- Canon-McMillan School District
- Charleroi School District
- Chartiers-Houston School District
- Fort Cherry School District (also in Allegheny County)
- McGuffey School District
- Peters Township School District
- Ringgold School District
- Trinity Area School District
- Washington School District

Served by

- Intermediate Unit 1 – Coal Center
- Mon Valley Career and Technology Center – Charleroi
- Western Area Career and Technology Center – Canonsburg

=== Private schools ===
- Calvary Chapel Christian School – Fredericktown
- Central Christian Academy – Houston
- Children's School of Washington
- Cornerstone Mennonite School – Burgettstown
- Faith Christian School of Washington – Washington
- First Love Christian Academy High – Washington
- Goddard School – Venetia
- Gwens Montessori School Inc – Washington
- Hickory Christian School – Hickory
- Huntington Learning Center – McMurray
- John F Kennedy School – Washington
- Kinder Care Learning Centers
- Lakeview Christian Academy – Bridgeville
- Madonna Catholic Regional School – Monongahela
- Mel Blount Leadership Academy – Claysville
- NHS School – Ellsworth
- Rainbows End Learning Center – Washington
- St Francis Children's School – Beallsville
- The Oaks Academy - Washington
- Tri-State Christian School – Burgettstown

=== Libraries ===
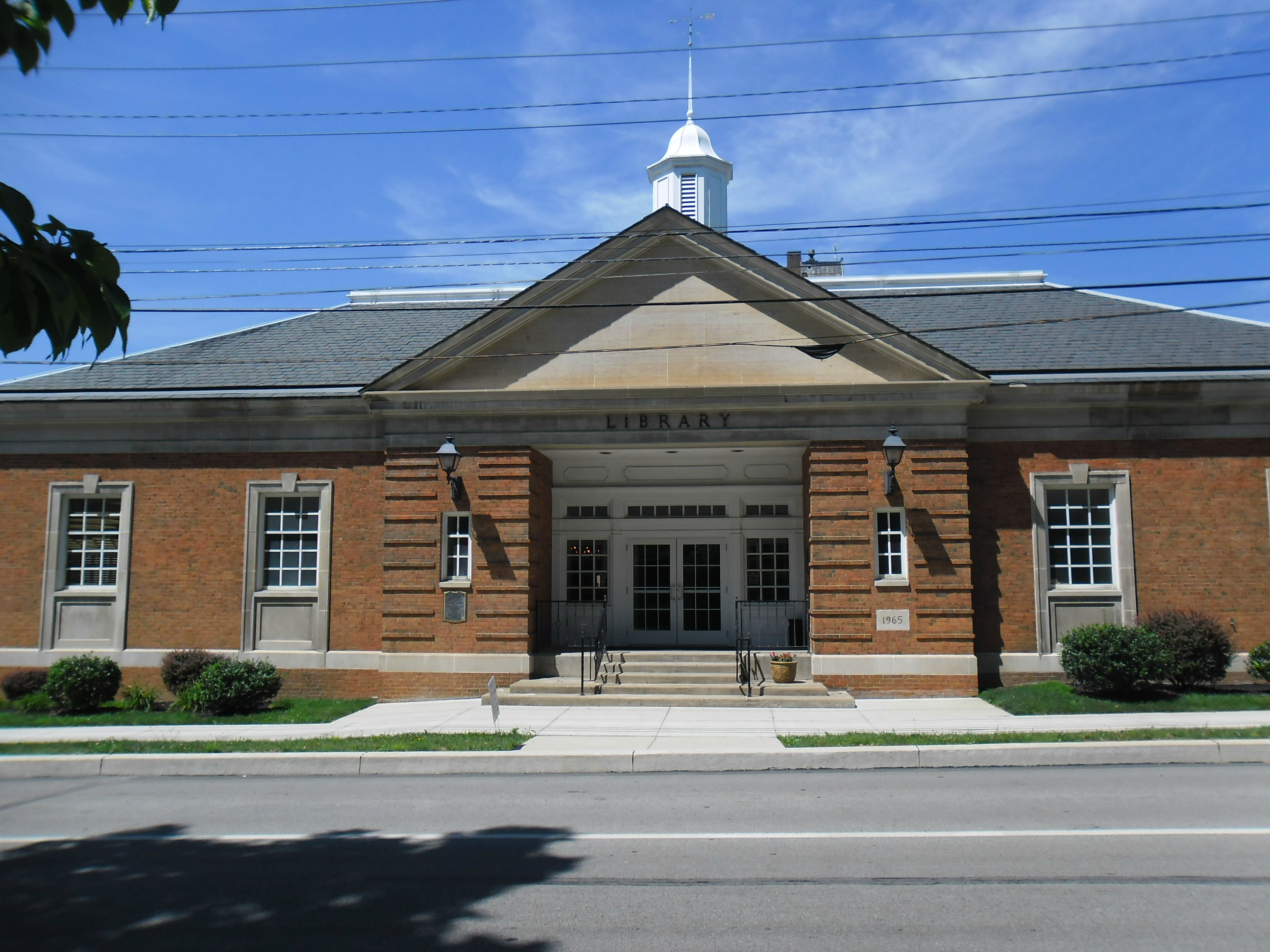
Citizens Library in Washington

- Avella Area Library Center
- Bentleyville Public Library
- Burgettstown Community Library
- California Public Library
- Chartiers-Houston Community Library
- Citizens Library – Washington
- Donora Public Library
- Frank Sarris Public Library – Canonsburg
- Fredericktown Area Public Library
- Heritage Public Library – McDonald
- John K Tener Library – Charleroi
- Marianna Community Public Library
- Monongahela Area Library
- Peters Township Public Library
- Washington County Library System

== Hospitals ==
- Canonsburg Hospital, part of Allegheny Health Network in North Strabane Township
- Penn Highlands Mon Valley, part of Penn Highlands Healthcare, formerly Monongahela Valley Hospital in Carroll Township
- UPMC Washington in the City of Washington

== Communities ==
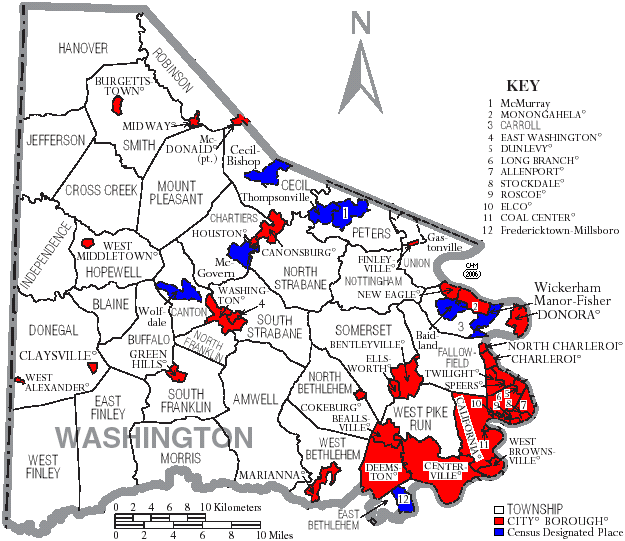
Map of Washington County, Pennsylvania with municipal labels showing cities and boroughs (red), townships (white), and Census-designated places (blue).

Under Pennsylvania law, there are four types of incorporated municipalities: cities, boroughs, townships, and, in at most two cases, towns. The following cities, boroughs and townships are located in Washington County:

=== Cities ===
- Monongahela
- Washington (county seat)

=== Boroughs ===
- Allenport
- Beallsville
- Bentleyville
- Burgettstown
- California
- Canonsburg
- Centerville
- Charleroi
- Claysville
- Coal Center
- Cokeburg
- Deemston
- Donora
- Dunlevy
- East Washington
- Elco
- Ellsworth
- Finleyville
- Green Hills
- Houston
- Long Branch
- Marianna
- McDonald (partly in Allegheny County)
- Midway
- New Eagle
- North Charleroi
- Roscoe
- Speers
- Stockdale
- Twilight
- West Brownsville
- West Middletown

=== Townships ===
- Amwell
- Blaine
- Buffalo
- Canton
- Carroll
- Cecil
- Chartiers
- Cross Creek
- Donegal
- East Bethlehem
- East Finley
- Fallowfield
- Hanover
- Hopewell
- Independence
- Jefferson
- Morris
- Mount Pleasant
- North Bethlehem
- North Franklin
- North Strabane
- Nottingham
- Peters
- Robinson
- Smith
- Somerset
- South Franklin
- South Strabane
- Union
- West Bethlehem
- West Finley
- West Pike Run

=== Census-designated places ===
Census-designated places are geographical areas designated by the U.S. Census Bureau for the purposes of compiling demographic data. They are not actual jurisdictions under Pennsylvania law.

- Aaronsburg
- Atlasburg
- Avella
- Baidland
- Bulger
- Cecil-Bishop
- Cross Creek
- Eighty Four
- Elrama
- Fredericktown
- Gastonville
- Hendersonville
- Hickory
- Joffre
- Langeloth
- Lawrence
- McGovern
- McMurray
- Meadowlands
- Millsboro
- Muse
- Paris
- Slovan
- Southview
- Taylorstown
- Thompsonville
- Van Voorhis
- West Alexander
- Westland
- Wickerham Manor-Fisher
- Wolfdale
- Wylandville

=== Unincorporated communities ===
- Amity
- Blainsburg
- Burnsville
- Condit Crossing
- Cool Valley
- Courtney
- Cracker Jack
- Daisytown
- Fallowfield
- Florence
- Frogtown
- Gambles
- Glyde
- Good Intent
- Hazel Kirk
- Laboratory
- Log Pile
- Lover
- Manifold
- Murdocksville
- McAdams
- North Fredericktown
- Old Concord
- P and W Patch
- Prosperity
- Raccoon
- Richeyville
- Scenery Hill
- Studa
- Venetia
- Vestaburg
- Woodrow

=== Former communities ===
- Allen Township
- Bethlehem Township
- East Pike Run Township
- Granville
- Pike Run
- Pike Run Township
- Smallwood
- South Canonsburg (annexed to Canonsburg in 1911)

=== Population ranking ===
The population ranking of the following table is based on the 2010 census of Washington County.

† county seat

Rank	City/Town/etc.	Municipal type	Population (2010 Census)
1	† Washington	City	13,663
2	Canonsburg	Borough	8,992
3	California	Borough	6,795
4	Donora	Borough	4,781
5	McMurray	CDP	4,647
6	Monongahela	City	4,300
7	Charleroi	Borough	4,120
8	Thompsonville	CDP	3,520
9	Centerville	Borough	3,263
10	Wolfdale	CDP	2,888
11	Gastonville	CDP	2,818
12	McGovern	CDP	2,742
13	Bentleyville	Borough	2,581
14	Muse	CDP	2,504
15	Cecil-Bishop	CDP	2,476
16	East Washington	Borough	2,234
17	New Eagle	Borough	2,184
18	McDonald (partially in Allegheny County)	Borough	2,149
19	Wickerham Manor-Fisher	CDP	1,728
20	Baidland	CDP	1,563
21	Burgettstown	Borough	1,388
22	North Charleroi	Borough	1,313
23	Houston	Borough	1,296
24	Speers	Borough	1,154
25	Ellsworth	Borough	1,027
26	West Brownsville	Borough	992
27	Midway	Borough	913
28	Claysville	Borough	829
29	Meadowlands	CDP	822
30	Roscoe	Borough	812
31	Avella	CDP	804
32	Hickory	CDP	740
33	Paris	CDP	732
34	Deemston	Borough	722
35	Langeloth	CDP	717
36	Millsboro	CDP	666
37	Eighty Four	CDP	657
38	Cokeburg	Borough	630
39	West Alexander	CDP	604
40	Slovan	CDP	555
41	Lawrence	CDP	540
42	Allenport	Borough	537
43	Joffre	CDP	536
44	Stockdale	Borough	502
45	Marianna	Borough	494
46	Beallsville	Borough	466
47	Finleyville	Borough	461
48	Long Branch	Borough	447
49	Bulger	CDP	407
50	Fredericktown	CDP	403
51	Atlasburg	CDP	401
52	Wylandville	CDP	391
53	Dunlevy	Borough	381
54	Hendersonville	CDP	325
55	Elco	Borough	323
56	Elrama	CDP	307
57	Southview	CDP	276
58	Aaronsburg	CDP	259
59	Twilight	Borough	233
60	Taylorstown	CDP	217
61	Westland	CDP	167
62	Van Voorhis	CDP	166
T-63	Coal Center	Borough	139
T-63	West Middletown	Borough	139
64	Cross Creek	CDP	137
65	Green Hills	Borough	29

== Notable people ==
- John Alexander Anderson, born in Washington County, United States Congressman from Kansas
- Kurt Angle (born 1968), resided in Canonsburg, Olympic gold medalist and Professional wrestler
- William Patterson Bane, claimant to tallest soldier in the American Civil War (1843–1912)
- James G. Blaine (1830–1893), native of West Brownsville, United States Secretary of State, Speaker of the House of Representatives, and 1884 Republican presidential nominee
- David Bradford, born in Maryland 1760 and resided in Washington, early deputy attorney-general for Washington County, became a leader in the Whiskey Rebellion challenging the nascent United States federal government
- William J. Carson (1840–1913), Civil War Medal of Honor recipient, 1863
- Alexander Clark (1826–1891), born in Washington County, "The Colored Orator of the West", Minister to Liberia 1890–1891
- Perry Como (1912–2001), native of Canonsburg, recording artist and television performer
- Mitch Daniels (born 1949), native of Monongahela, former Governor of Indiana, current president of Purdue University
- James K. L. Duncan (1845–1913), Union Navy sailor awarded the Medal of Honor
- William C. Farabee (1865–1925), anthropologist, was born and died in Washington County
- Ken Griffey Jr. (born 1969), native of Donora, Major League Baseball player
- Ken Griffey Sr. (born 1950), native of Donora, Major League Baseball player
- John Guzik (1936–2012), football player
- Joseph Hardy (1923-2023), former resident of Eighty Four, philanthropist, former CEO and founder of 84 Lumber
- Pete Henry (1897–1952), NFL player/coach, member of Pro Football Hall of Fame.
- iJustine (born 1984), YouTube personality and actress
- Shirley Jones (born 1934), native of Charleroi, best known for her role as the mother of the Partridge Family and winning an Academy Award.
- Francis Julius LeMoyne (1798–1879) abolitionist and pioneer of cremation in the United States.
- Jonathan Letterman (1824–1872), native of Canonsburg, Father of Battlefield Medicine and Civil War surgeon
- William Henry Letterman (1832–1881), native of Canonsburg, co-founder of the Phi Kappa Psi fraternity, surgeon, and brother of Jonathan Letterman
- Marvin Lewis (born 1958), native of McDonald, National Football League player, coach
- Jay Livingston (1915–2001), native of McDonald, Oscar-winning songwriter
- William Holmes McGuffey (1800–1873), native of the western side of the county, famous educator and writer of McGuffey's Eclectic Readers – one of America's first text books
- John F. McJunkin (1830–1883), Iowa Attorney General
- John H. Mitchell (1835–1905), United States Senator, participant in original dispute in landmark Supreme Court case Pennoyer v. Neff
- Joe Montana (born 1956), native of Monongahela, National Football League player
- Stan Musial (1920–2013), native of Donora, Major League Baseball player
- Dave Pahanish (born 1971), Peters Township, Songwriter, Songwriter, Country Music songwriter for Keith Urban, Tim McGraw, Toby Keith, and Jimmy Wayne
- Deborah Jeane Palfrey (1956–2008), native of Charleroi, "The D.C. Madam"
- Christopher Rankin (1788-1826), member of the U.S. House of Representatives for Mississippi's at-large district, namesake of Rankin County
- John Walker Rankin (1823–1869), Iowa state senator
- David Redick (died 1805), Vice-President (Lt. Governor) of Pennsylvania for three weeks in 1788; surveyor—laid out the town of Washington.
- Kurt Schottenheimer (born 1949), native of McDonald, National Football League coach
- Marty Schottenheimer (1943–2021), native of McDonald, National Football League player, coach
- Paul Shannon (1909–1990), radio and television personality
- Bobby Vinton (born 1935), native of Canonsburg, recording artist
- Bob West (born 1956), native of Finleyville, voice actor best known for Barney & Friends
- Joseph Ruggles Wilson (1822–1903), graduate of Jefferson College (subsequently W&J), Presbyterian minister, father of Pres. Woodrow Wilson
- Bud Yorkin (1926–2015), American film and television producer, director, writer and actor.

== See also ==
- National Register of Historic Places listings in Washington County, Pennsylvania
