= Jane C. Charlton =

Astronomer

Jane C. Charlton (born June 5, 1965) is a professor of astronomy and astrophysics at Pennsylvania State University where she is a specialist in galaxy formation and evolution. She also has a daughter named Thomasin.

== Early life and education ==
Charlton was born in New Eagle, Pennsylvania. She was a child prodigy who obtained her Bachelor of Science in chemistry and physics from Carnegie Mellon University at the age of 18, in 1983. Charlton received both her PhD, in 1987, and her Master of Science, 1984, from the University of Chicago.

== Publications ==
- Jane C. Charlton, Microsoft Academic Search
