= Slovan, Pennsylvania =

Unincorporated community in Pennsylvania, US

Slovan
- Census-designated place
- Location of Slovan in Pennsylvania
- Coordinates: 40°21′28.533″N 80°23′21.9798″W
- Country: United States
- State: Pennsylvania
- County: Washington

Area
  - Total: 0.18 sq mi (0.47 km^{2})
  - Land: 0.18 sq mi (0.47 km^{2})
  - Water: 0.0 sq mi (0 km^{2})

Population (2010)
  - Total: 555
  - Density: 3,100/sq mi (1,200/km^{2})
- Time zone: UTC-4 (EST)
  - Summer (DST): UTC-5 (EDT)
- ZIP code: 15078
- Area code: 724

Slovan (/ˈsloʊvæn/ SLOH-van) is a census-designated place in Smith Township, Washington County, Pennsylvania. As of the 2010 census the population was 555 residents.

== Education ==
It is in the Burgettstown Area School District.
