= New Eagle, Pennsylvania =

Borough in Pennsylvania, US

New Eagle
- Borough
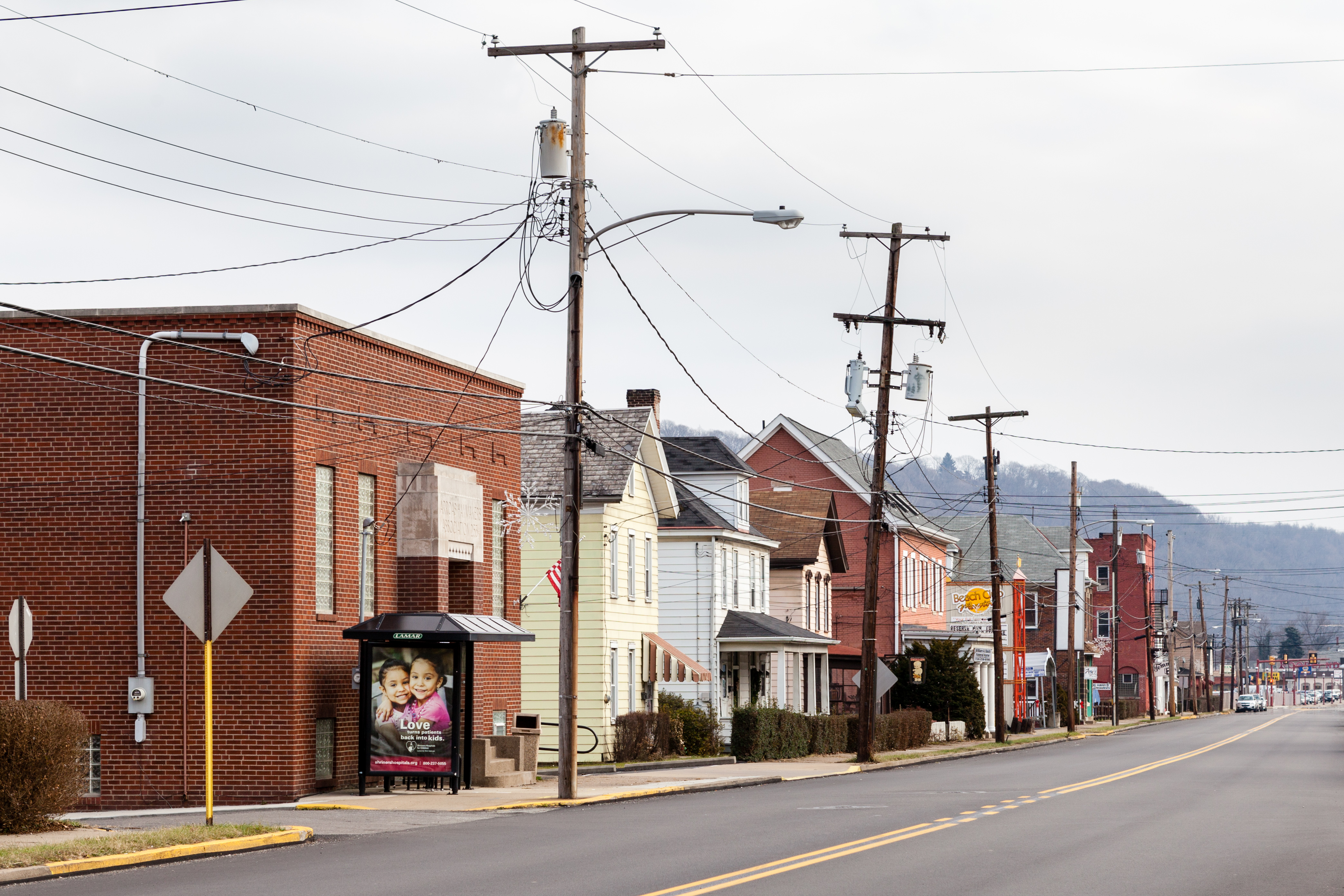
- Main St (PA 88), near intersection with Maple St, looking east.

- Location of New Eagle in Washington County, Pennsylvania.

- Location of New Eagle in Pennsylvania
- Coordinates: 40°12′27″N 79°57′11″W
- Country: United States
- State: Pennsylvania
- County: Washington
- Established: 1901

Government
  - Mayor: Charles M. Fine

Area
  - Total: 1.12 sq mi (2.89 km^{2})
  - Land: 1.02 sq mi (2.63 km^{2})
  - Water: 0.097 sq mi (0.25 km^{2})

Population (2020)
  - Total: 2,049
  - Density: 2,016/sq mi (778.5/km^{2})
- Time zone: UTC-4 (EST)
  - Summer (DST): UTC-5 (EDT)
- ZIP code: 15067
- Area code: 724
- FIPS code: 42-53496

New Eagle is a borough in Washington County, Pennsylvania, United States and is part of the Pittsburgh Metro Area. The population was 2,047 at the 2020 census.

== History ==
New Eagle, originally called Riverview, adjoins the City of Monongahela and was laid out in 1901 by J. S. Markell in Carroll Township and incorporated as the Borough of New Eagle on September 9, 1912. New Eagle is the birthplace of Pro Football Hall of Fame quarterback Joe Montana.

== Geography ==
New Eagle is located at 40°12′27″N 79°57′11″W (40.207526, -79.953045).

According to the United States Census Bureau, the borough has a total area of 1.1 square miles (2.8 km^{2}), of which 1.0 square mile (2.6 km^{2}) is land and 0.1 square miles (0.26 km^{2}) (8.04%) is water.

== Surrounding and adjacent neighborhoods ==
New Eagle has three land borders, including Monongahela to the east, Carroll Township to the south and west, and Union Township to the northwest. Across the Monongahela River in Allegheny County to the north, New Eagle runs adjacent with Forward Township in Allegheny County.

== Demographics ==
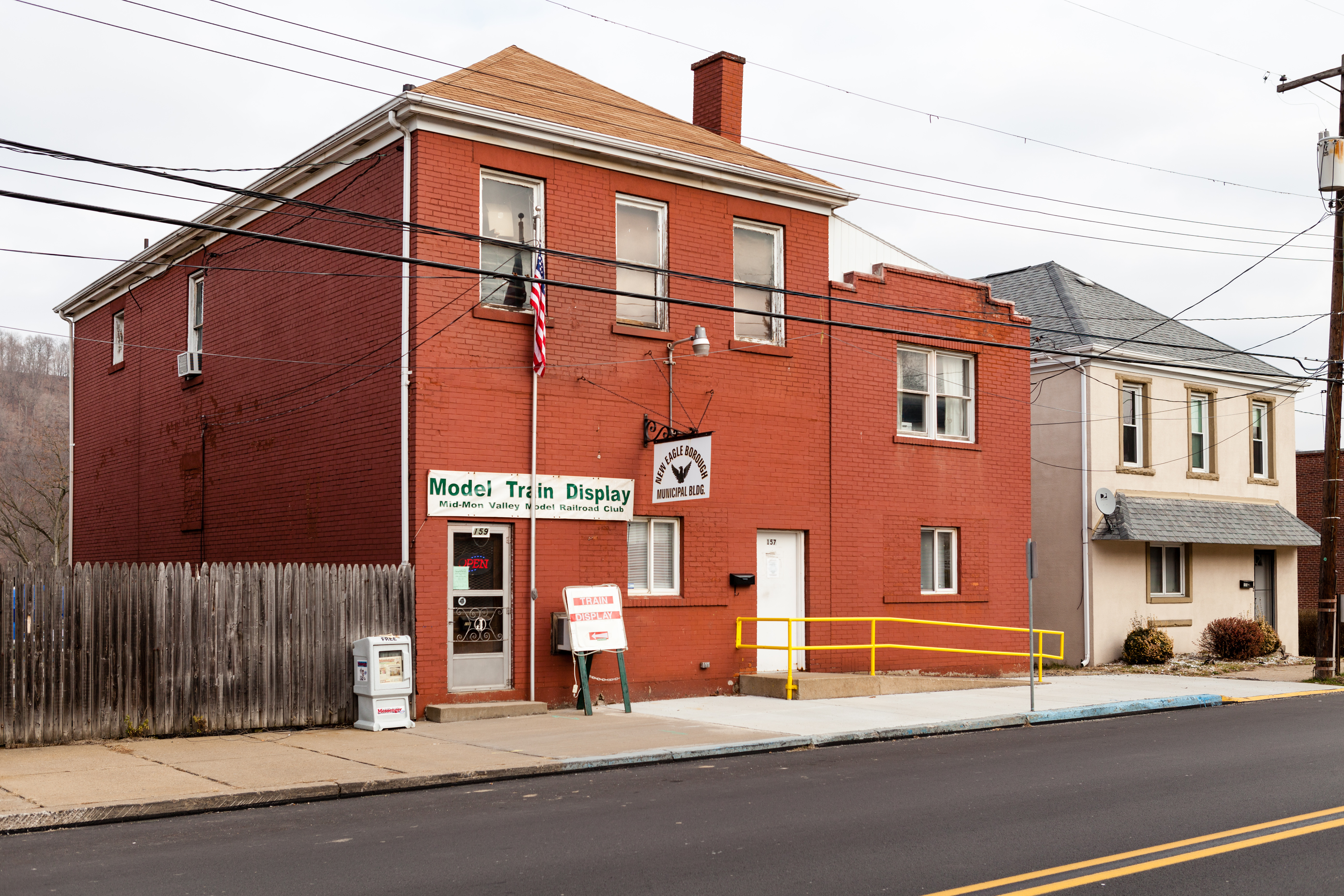
Municipal Bldg

Historical population
Census	Pop.	Note	%±
1920	1,572		—
1930	1,793		14.1%
1940	1,936		8.0%
1950	2,316		19.6%
1960	2,670		15.3%
1970	2,497		−6.5%
1980	2,617		4.8%
1990	2,172		−17.0%
2000	2,262		4.1%
2010	2,184		−3.4%
2020	2,049		−6.2%
2025 (est.)	2,018	▼	−1.5%

As of the census of 2000, there were 2,262 people, 962 households, and 650 families residing in the borough. The population density was 2,189.4 people per square mile (845.3 people/km^{2}). There were 1,068 housing units at an average density of 1,033.7 per square mile (399.1/km^{2}). The racial makeup of the borough was 96.99% White, 1.11% African American, 0.13% Native American, 0.49% Asian, 0.09% Pacific Islander, 0.13% from other races, and 1.06% from two or more races. Hispanic or Latino of any race were 0.09% of the population.

There were 962 households, out of which 26.1% had children under the age of 18 living with them, 51.6% were married couples living together, 12.3% had a female householder with no husband present, and 32.4% were non-families. 27.3% of all households were made up of individuals, and 13.7% had someone living alone who was 65 years of age or older. The average household size was 2.35 and the average family size was 2.86.

In the borough the population was spread out, with 21.6% under the age of 18, 6.4% from 18 to 24, 27.9% from 25 to 44, 24.0% from 45 to 64, and 20.1% who were 65 years of age or older. The median age was 41 years. For every 100 females, there were 90.1 males. For every 100 females age 18 and over, there were 87.2 males.

The median income for a household in the borough was $30,494, and the median income for a family was $35,500. Males had a median income of $33,100 versus $22,786 for females. The per capita income for the borough was $15,636. About 7.8% of families and 9.5% of the population were below the poverty line, including 15.6% of those under age 18 and 3.1% of those age 65 or over.

== Education ==
It is in the Ringgold School District.

== Notable people ==
- Jane C. Charlton, astronomer
- Joe Montana, Pro Football Hall of Fame quarterback for the San Francisco 49ers and Kansas City Chiefs
