= Smith Township, Washington County, Pennsylvania =

Township in Pennsylvania, US

Coordinates: 40°23′00″N 80°21′59″W

Smith Township
- Township
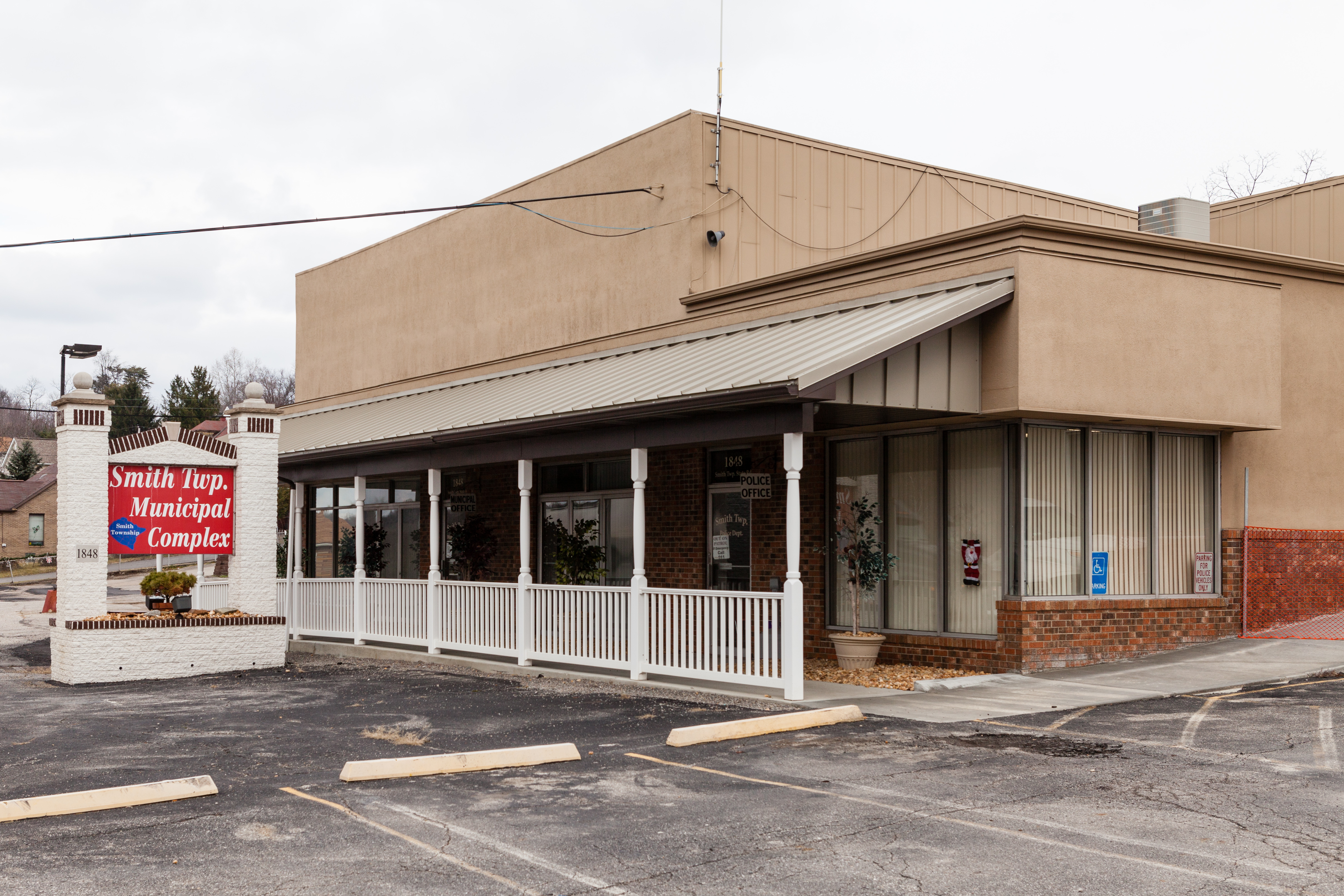
- Municipal complex

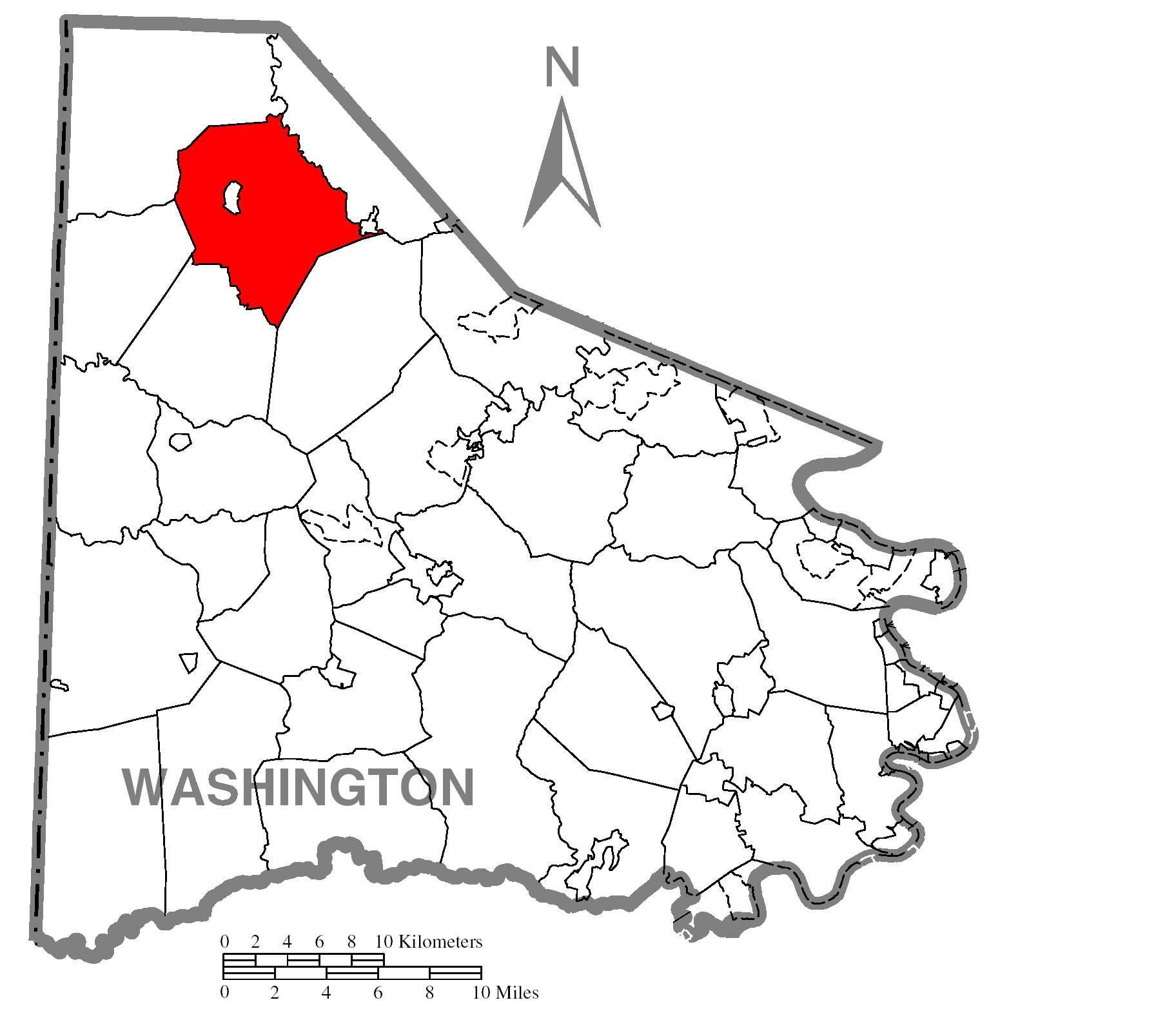
- Location of Smith Township in Washington County

- Location of Washington County in Pennsylvania
- Country: United States
- State: Pennsylvania
- County: Washington County
- Established: 1781

Area
  - Total: 34.46 sq mi (89.24 km^{2})
  - Land: 34.44 sq mi (89.20 km^{2})
  - Water: 0.015 sq mi (0.04 km^{2})

Population (2020)
  - Total: 4,224 ▼
  - Estimate (2021): 4,205
  - Density: 127.9/sq mi (49.37/km^{2})
- Time zone: UTC-4 (EST)
  - Summer (DST): UTC-5 (EDT)
- Area code: 724
- FIPS code: 42-125-71288
- Website: www.smithtownship.org

Historical population
Census	Pop.	Note	%±
2000	4,567		—
2010	4,476		−2.0%
2020	4,224		−5.6%
2025 (est.)	4,205		−0.4%
U.S. Decennial Census

Smith Township is a township in Washington County, Pennsylvania, United States. As of the 2020 census, the township population was 4,224.

== Geography ==
According to the United States Census Bureau, the township has a total area of 34.4 square miles (89.1 km^{2}), of which 34.4 square miles (89.0 km^{2}) is land and 0.04 square miles (0.1 km^{2}) (0.06%) is water.

== Communities in Smith Township ==
=== Villages ===
Atlasburg, Bavington (also in Hanover Township, Washington County), Bonnymeade, Bulger, Cherry Valley, Erie Mine, Francis Mine, Harmon Creek, Hickton, Joffre, Langeloth, and Slovan

== Surrounding communities ==
Smith Township has seven borders, including Hanover Township to the north and northwest, Robinson Township to the northeast, Midway to the east, Mount Pleasant Township to the southeast, Cross Creek Township to the southwest, Jefferson Township to the west, and Burgettstown, which it completely surrounds.

== Demographics ==
At the 2000 census there were 4,567 people, 1,813 households, and 1,281 families living in the township. The population density was 132.8 inhabitants per square mile (51.3/km^{2}). There were 1,928 housing units at an average density of 56.1 per square mile (21.7/km^{2}). The racial makeup of the township was 97.42% White, 1.82% African American, 0.07% Native American, 0.11% Asian, 0.11% from other races, and 0.48% from two or more races. Hispanic or Latino of any race were 0.96%.

Of the 1,813 households 30.0% had children under the age of 18 living with them, 55.2% were married couples living together, 11.1% had a female householder with no husband present, and 29.3% were non-families. 25.9% of households were one person and 13.5% were one person aged 65 or older. The average household size was 2.52 and the average family size was 3.03.

The age distribution was 23.8% under the age of 18, 6.3% from 18 to 24, 28.6% from 25 to 44, 24.0% from 45 to 64, and 17.3% 65 or older. The median age was 40 years. For every 100 females, there were 98.4 males. For every 100 females age 18 and over, there were 95.7 males.

The median household income was $36,134 and the median family income was $45,327. Males had a median income of $34,762 versus $21,599 for females. The per capita income for the township was $16,864. About 7.0% of families and 10.2% of the population were below the poverty line, including 18.0% of those under age 18 and 4.4% of those age 65 or over.

== Notable person ==
- Barry Alvarez, former college football coach and Athletics Director at the University of Wisconsin
