= Jefferson Township, Washington County, Pennsylvania =

Township in Pennsylvania, US

Jefferson Township
- Township
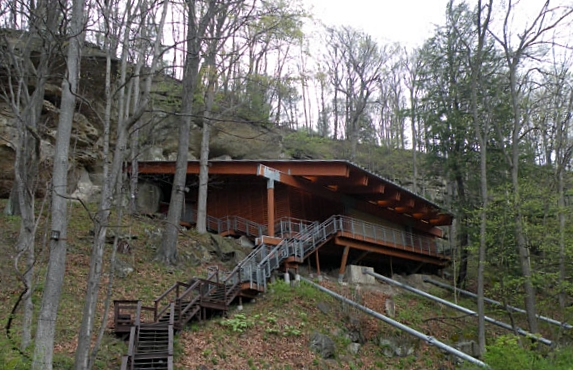
- Meadowcroft Rockshelter, one of North America's most significant archaeological sites, in Jefferson Township

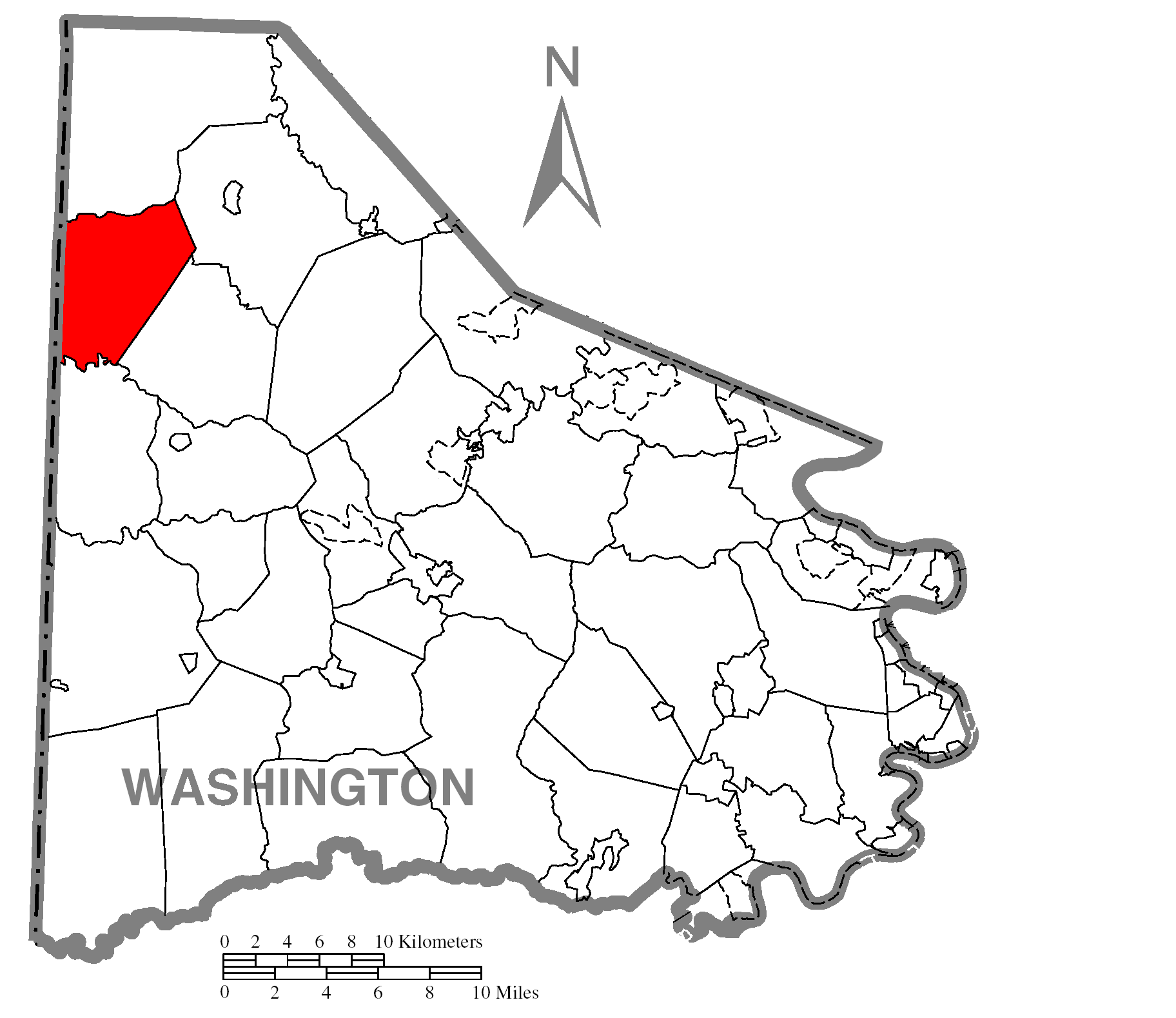
- Location of Jefferson Township in Washington County, Pennsylvania

- Location of Washington County in Pennsylvania
- Country: United States
- State: Pennsylvania
- County: Washington County

Area
  - Total: 22.64 sq mi (58.64 km^{2})
  - Land: 22.63 sq mi (58.60 km^{2})
  - Water: 0.015 sq mi (0.04 km^{2})

Population (2020)
  - Total: 1,116 ▼
  - Estimate (2021): 1,114
  - Density: 50.7/sq mi (19.57/km^{2})
- Time zone: UTC-4 (EST)
  - Summer (DST): UTC-5 (EDT)
- Area code: 724
- FIPS code: 42-125-37936
- Website: www.jeffersontwpwashpa.org

Historical population
Census	Pop.	Note	%±
2000	1,218		—
2010	1,162		−4.6%
2020	1,116		−4.0%
2025 (est.)	1,112		−0.4%
U.S. Decennial Census

Jefferson Township is a township in Washington County, Pennsylvania, United States. The population was 1,116 at the 2020 census.

== History ==
The Meadowcroft Rockshelter and Pine Bank Covered Bridge are listed on the National Register of Historic Places.

== Geography ==
According to the U.S. Census Bureau, the township has a total area of 24.2 square miles (63 km^{2}), 24.2 square miles (63 km^{2}) of which is land and 0.04% of which is water.

== Surrounding communities ==
Jefferson Township has five borders: the townships of Hanover to the north, Smith to the northeast, Cross Creek from the east to south-southeast, and Independence to the south, and Brooke County, West Virginia to the west.

== Demographics ==
At the 2000 census, there were 1,218 people, 469 households, and 354 families living in the township. The population density was 50.3 inhabitants per square mile (19.4/km^{2}). There were 494 housing units at an average density of 20.4/sq mi (7.9/km^{2}). The racial makeup of the township was 98.52% White, 0.90% African American, 0.16% Asian, 0.16% from other races, and 0.25% from two or more races. Hispanic or Latino of any race were 0.74%.

Of the 469 households 29.4% had children under the age of 18 living with them, 67.0% were married couples living together, 5.8% had a female householder with no husband present, and 24.5% were non-families. 21.5% of households were one person and 11.7% were one person aged 65 or older. The average household size was 2.60 and the average family size was 3.05.

The age distribution was 23.5% under the age of 18, 5.1% from 18 to 24, 27.4% from 25 to 44, 28.8% from 45 to 64, and 15.2% 65 or older. The median age was 41 years. For every 100 females there were 95.2 males. For every 100 females age 18 and over, there were 97.9 males.

The median household income was $47,500 and the median family income was $54,663. Males had a median income of $38,214 versus $28,500 for females. The per capita income for the township was $19,609. About 3.6% of families and 4.8% of the population were below the poverty line, including 5.7% of those under age 18 and 5.0% of those age 65 or over.

== Attractions ==
Meadowcroft Rockshelter is located along the southern boundary of the township.
