= Trinity Area School District =

School district in Pennsylvania

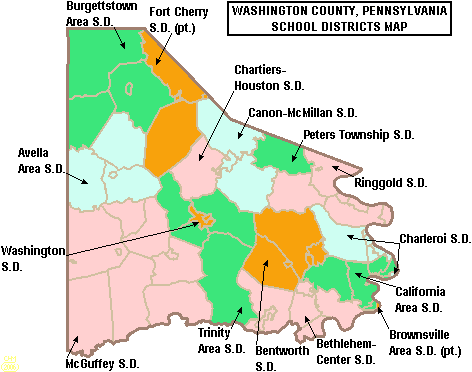

Address
- 231 Park Avenue Washington, Washington County, Pennsylvania, 15301; United States

District information
- Established: 1925

Students and staff
- Colors: Blue, white

Other information
- Website: www.trinitypride.org

Trinity Area School District is a public school district located outside the city of Washington in southwestern Pennsylvania. It serves the Pittsburgh exurbs of Canton Township, South Strabane Township, and North Franklin Township, as well as rural Amwell Township. Trinity Area encompasses approximately 87 square miles (230 km^{2}). According to 2000 federal census data, it serves a resident population of 25,591. By 2010, the district's population increased to 26,072 people. The educational attainment levels for the Trinity Area School District population (25 years old and over) were 88% high school graduates and 22.8% college graduates. Trinity Area School District is one of the 500 public school districts of Pennsylvania and one of 15 public school districts operating in Washington County.

According to the Pennsylvania Budget and Policy Center, 25% of the district's pupils lived at 185% or below the Federal Poverty Level as shown by their eligibility for the federal free or reduced price school meal programs in 2012. In 2013 the Pennsylvania Department of Education, reported that 11 students in the Trinity Area School District were homeless. In 2009, Trinity Area School District residents' per capita income was $19,473, while the median family income was $48,310. In the Commonwealth, the median family income was $49,501 and the United States median family income was $49,445, in 2010. In Washington County, the median household income was $53,693. By 2013, the median household income in the United States rose to $52,100. In 2014, the median household income in the USA was $53,700.

The district operates six schools. In the 1990s, the district's elementary schools were consolidated into the four existing elementary schools: Trinity North Elementary, Trinity East Elementary, Trinity South Elementary, Trinity West Elementary, which serves grades kindergarten through third.

The district operates Trinity Intermediate School for grades fourth and fifth. It is located on the same property as Trinity Middle School.

The district operates Trinity Middle School for grades six through eight, which was designed and constructed in the shape of an 'M'. The middle school houses the swimming pool for both the district's middle school swim and varsity swim team. The high-school's football field and stadium is on middle school grounds. The stadium is used for other varsity sports: boys and girls lacrosse, boys and girls soccer, marching band, and track and field.

Trinity High School hosts grades nine to twelve. High school students may choose to attend the Western Area Career Technology Center (WACTC) for training in the construction and mechanical trades, as well as other careers. The Intermediate Unit IU1 provides the district with a wide variety of services, such as: specialized education for disabled students, state-mandated training on recognizing and reporting child abuse, speech and visual disability services; criminal background check processing for prospective employees and professional development for staff and faculty.

== History ==
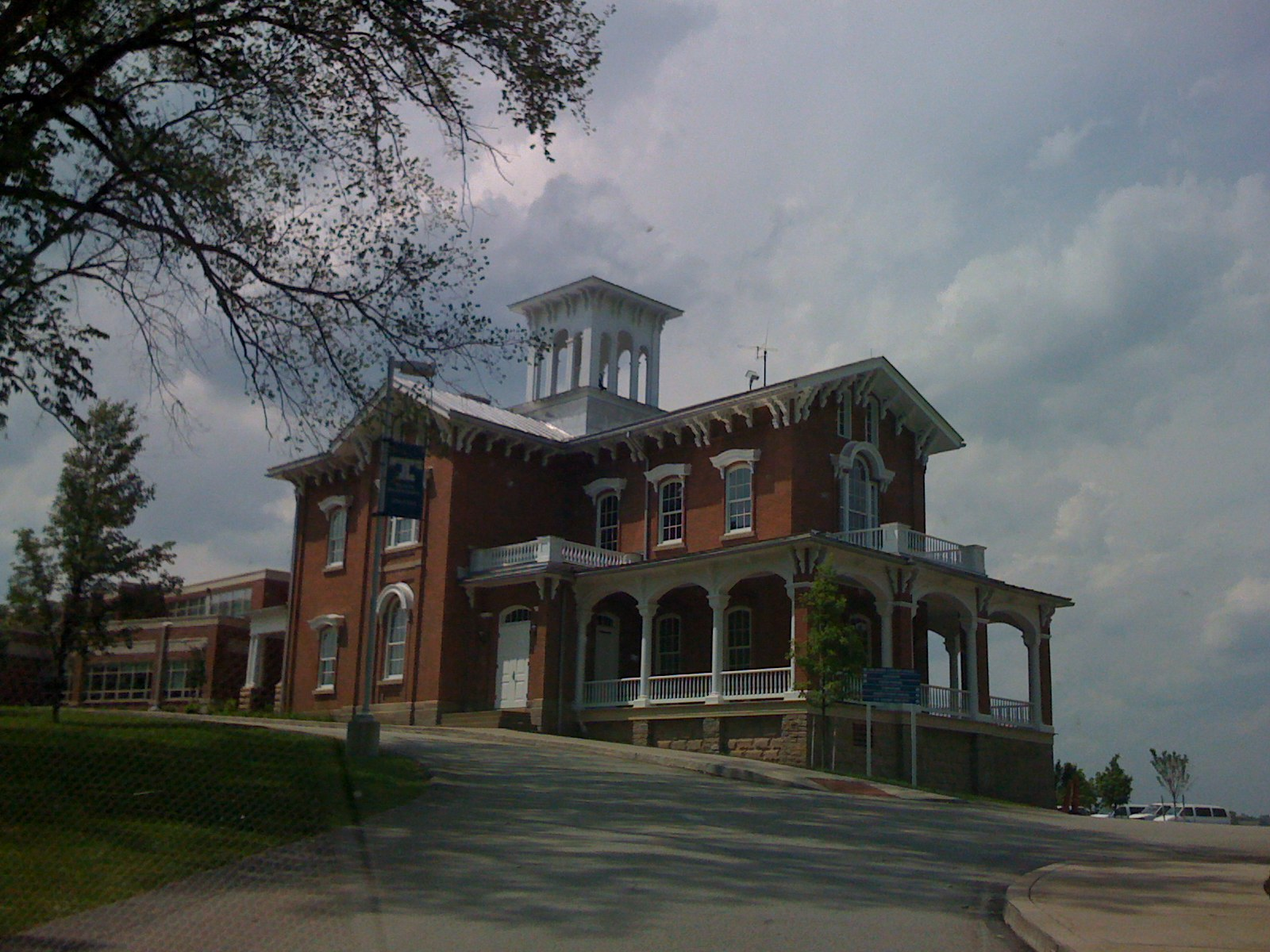
The historic Spring Hill mansion, a centerpiece of Trinity Hall and Trinity High School

=== Spring Hill ===
Trinity Area School District takes its name from Trinity Hall School for Boys that operated from 1879 to 1906. The historic school grounds in North Franklin Township date back to the 1850s when Joseph McKnight built a home on top of a hill overlooking the then-borough of Washington, Pennsylvania. This twenty-five room Italianate mansion called Spring Hill now functions as the district's administrative offices.

Spring Hill was purchased by William Smith, a prominent Washington dry goods merchant, as the new home for his son. The Smith family hired Boston-based landscape artist Robert Morris Copeland to prepare the grounds along Catfish Creek before it was occupied by William Wrenshaw Smith and his wife Emma Willard McKennan Smith. Wrenshaw Smith was a cousin to Julia Dent, wife of President Ulysses S. Grant. Wrenshaw Smith also served as Grant's aide-de-camp during the Civil War and Grant visited the Spring Hill mansion on multiple occasions.

=== Trinity Hall School for Boys ===
William Wrenshaw Smith was a devout Episcopalian and longtime vestryman at Trinity Episcopal Church, then located on Beau Street near Washington and Jefferson College. During the 1860s, Smith worked alongside John Barrett Kerfoot, newly elected Bishop of Pittsburgh, to create a boys’ school following the curricular model of famed priest-educator William Augustus Muhlenberg. In this model, “the school was to be like a large family with a priest as rector serving as father-figure in loco parentis.” Trinity Hall operated from 1879 to 1906 attracting members of prominent regional families including Heinz, Carnegie, Kammerer, and LeMoyne along with a grandson of President Grant.

In 1883, Trinity School for Boys began adopting elements of Muscular Christianity. This included a “military department” for purposes of exercise and a more generic Protestant Christianity in place of Muhlenberg's strictly Episcopalian church school model. Sometimes this leads to overemphasis on the military nature of the school and mistaken conclusions that Trinity Hall was a strict military academy. Various Episcopal priests served as school rector until the 1890s when patron William Wrenshaw Smith became lay rector, a change possibly due to declining enrollment and revenue. Trinity Hall closed in 1906, two years after Smith's death.

=== Trinity Hall becomes Trinity High School ===
Trinity Hall, a Smith family property, stood vacant for nearly two decades. In 1922, it was unsuccessfully considered as a site for relocating Presbyterian-affiliated Washington Female Seminary. Then in 1925 the townships of Amwell, Canton, North Franklin, and South Strabane purchased the Trinity Hall property for repurposing as a joint public high school. The sale nearly fell through. Amwell Township's secretary refused to sign documents until forced to do so by the Pennsylvania Supreme Court. The classroom block of Trinity Hall was used from 1883 until 2004. It was demolished in 2006. The Spring Hill section of Trinity Hall continues to serve as offices for Trinity Area School District.

The school district now maintains Trinity Hall Museum open by appointment only.
