= Peters Township School District =

School district in Pennsylvania

Coordinates: 40.28289°N 80.08009°W

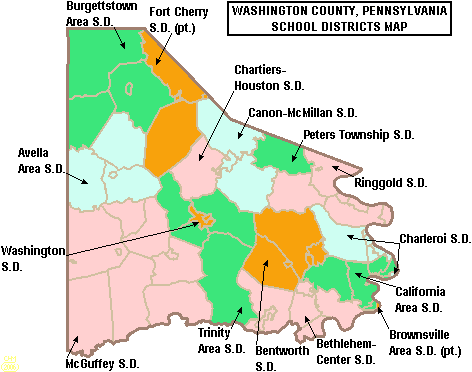
- 631 East McMurray Road McMurray, Pennsylvania

District information
- Type: Public

Students and staff
- District mascot: Indian
- Colors: Red & White

Other information
- Website: www.ptsd.k12.pa.us

Peters Township School District is a large, suburban public school district located in Washington County, Pennsylvania and encompasses an area of 19.5 square miles (51 km^{2}). The district is home to 21,219 residents according to the 2010 U.S. census. The educational attainment levels for the district’s population (25 years old and over) are 95.9% high school graduates and 56.1% college graduates.

According to the Pennsylvania Budget and Policy Center, 3.2% of the district's pupils lived at 185% or below the Federal Poverty Level as shown by their eligibility for the National School Lunch Program. In 2009, the district’s residents’ per capita income was $36,159, while the median family income was $86,661.

Peters Township School District operates five schools: Bower Hill Elementary School (grades K-3), Pleasant Valley Elementary School (grades K-3), McMurray Elementary School (grades 4-5), Peters Township Middle School (grades 6-8), and Peters Township High School (grades 9-12).

Peters Township High school also utilizes the Western Area Career Technology Center (WACTC) for training in the construction and mechanical trades. Furthermore, the Intermediate Unit located in McMurray provides the district with a wide variety of services such as specialized education for disabled students, background checks for prospective employees, and professional development for current staff and faculty.

== Extracurriculars ==
Peters Township School District offers a wide variety of extracurricular activities. Peters Township High School athletic teams compete in the Western Pennsylvania Interscholastic Athletic League and the high school offers sixteen varsity-level sports: Baseball, Basketball, Cheerleading, Cross Country, Field Hockey, Football, Golf, Ice Hockey, Lacrosse, Soccer, Softball, Swimming & Diving, Tennis, Track & Field, Volleyball, and Wrestling.
