= Canton Township, Washington County, Pennsylvania =

Township in Pennsylvania, US

Canton Township
- Township
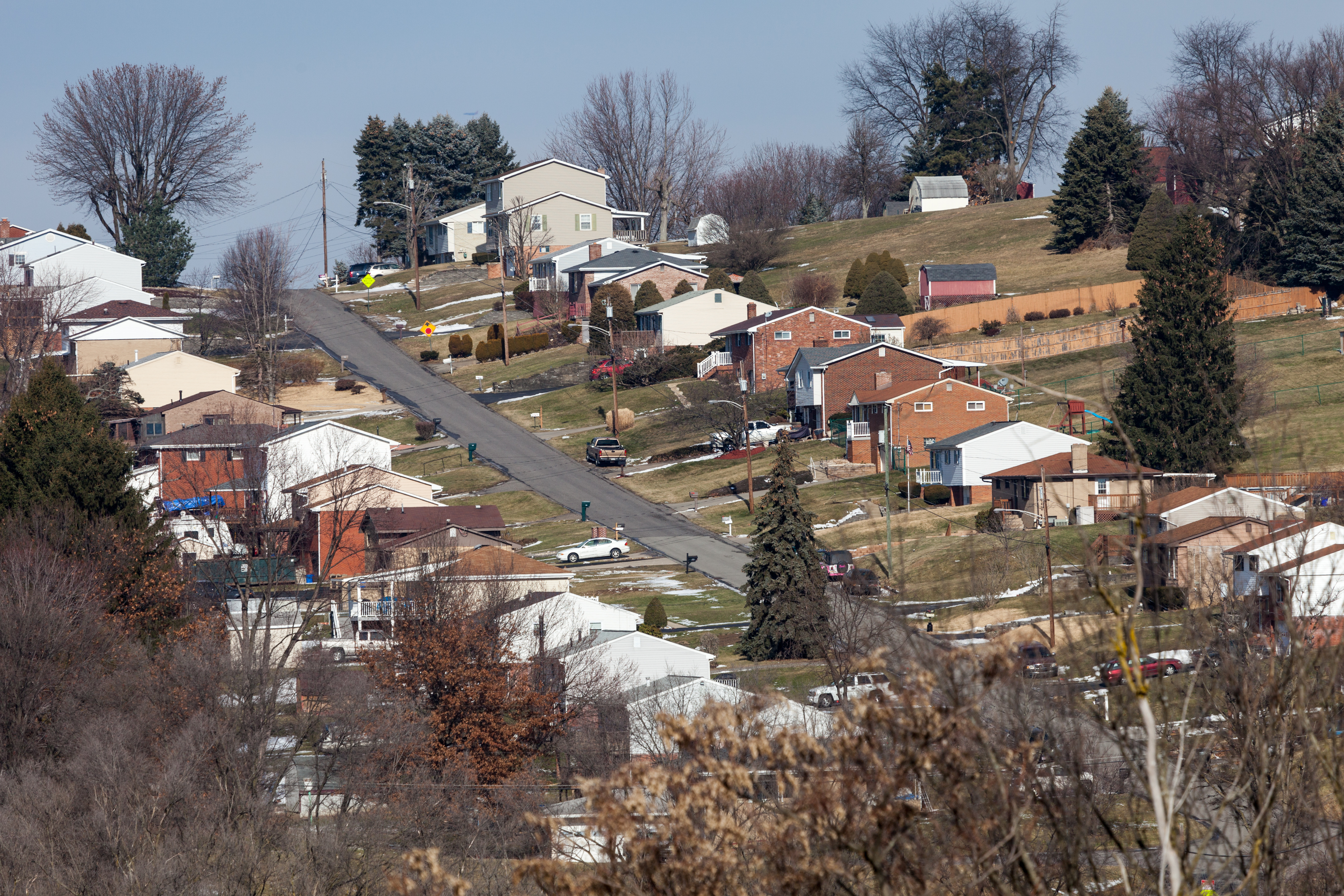
- Cortez Dr, as seen from Oakwood Ave.

- Logo

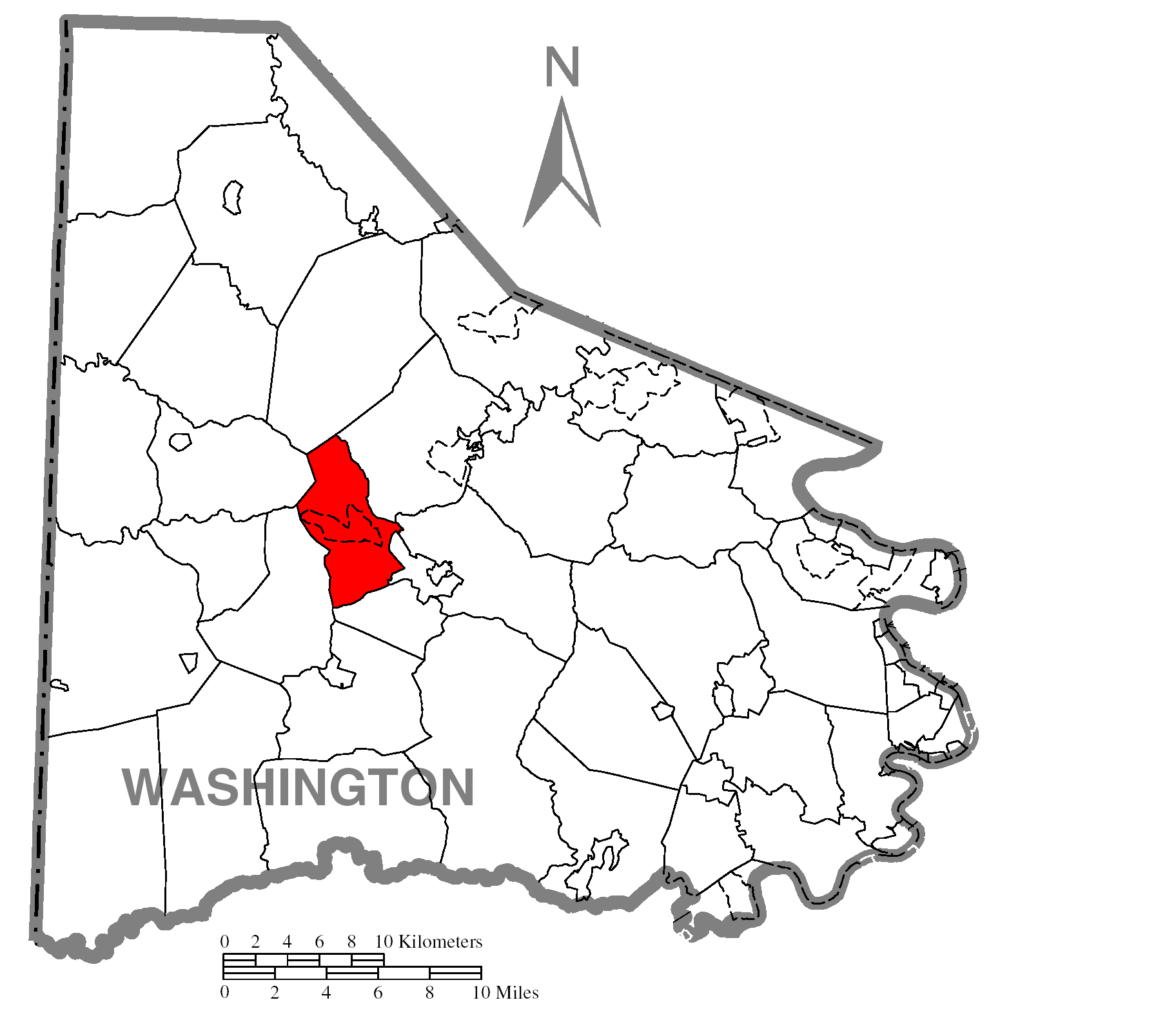
- Location of Canton Township in Washington County

- Location of Washington County in Pennsylvania
- Country: United States
- State: Pennsylvania
- County: Washington

Area
  - Total: 14.87 sq mi (38.51 km^{2})
  - Land: 14.87 sq mi (38.51 km^{2})
  - Water: 0 sq mi (0.00 km^{2})

Population (2020)
  - Total: 8,218 ▲
  - Estimate (2023): 8,269
  - Density: 549.7/sq mi (212.23/km^{2})
- Time zone: UTC-4 (EST)
  - Summer (DST): UTC-5 (EDT)
- Area code: 724
- FIPS code: 42-125-11176
- Website: www.yourcanton.com

Historical population
| Census | Pop. | Note | %± |
|---|---|---|---|
| 2000 | 8,826 | | — |
| 2010 | 8,375 | | −5.1% |
| 2020 | 8,218 | | −1.9% |
| 2025 (est.) | 8,269 | | 0.6% |
U.S. Decennial Census

Canton Township is a township in Washington County, Pennsylvania, United States. The population was 8,218 at the 2020 census.

== Geography ==
According to the United States Census Bureau, the township has a total area of 14.9 square miles (39 km^{2}), all land. It contains the census-designated place of Wolfdale.

== Demographics ==
As of the census of 2000, there were 8,826 people, 3,579 households, and 2,541 families living in the township. The population density was 592.7 inhabitants per square mile (228.8/km^{2}). There were 3,771 housing units at an average density of 253.3 per square mile (97.8/km^{2}). The racial makeup of the township was 95.52% White, 3.01% African American, 0.07% Native American, 0.19% Asian, 0.16% from other races, and 1.04% from two or more races. Hispanic or Latino of any race were 0.46% of the population.

There were 3,579 households, out of which 29.8% had children under the age of 18 living with them, 53.9% were married couples living together, 13.2% had a female householder with no husband present, and 29.0% were non-families. 24.6% of all households were made up of individuals, and 10.7% had someone living alone who was 65 years of age or older. The average household size was 2.44 and the average family size was 2.90.

In the township, the population was spread out, with 22.6% under the age of 18, 6.9% from 18 to 24, 28.1% from 25 to 44, 25.8% from 45 to 64, and 16.6% who were 65 years of age or older. The median age was 40 years. For every 100 females, there were 89.3 males. For every 100 females age 18 and over, there were 85.5 males.

The median income for a household in the township was $31,625, and the median income for a family was $40,014. Males had a median income of $33,194 versus $21,966 for females. The per capita income for the township was $15,420. About 10.6% of families and 14.0% of the population were below the poverty line, including 17.6% of those under age 18 and 9.6% of those age 65 or over.
