= Ringgold School District =

School district in Pennsylvania

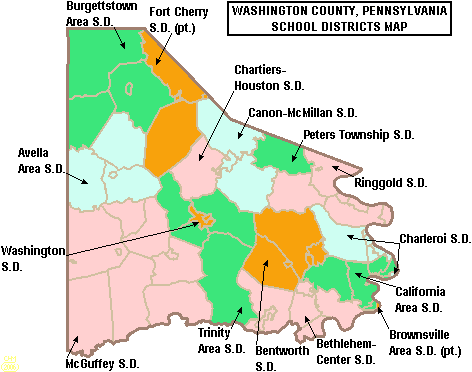

Address
- 400 Main Street New Eagle, Pennsylvania, 15067; United States
- Coordinates: 40.20831°N 79.95008°W

District information
- Type: Public

Students and staff
- District mascot: Ram
- Colors: Blue and gold

Other information
- Website: ringgold.org

Ringgold School District is a midsized, suburban, public school district located in the northeastern corner of Washington County, Pennsylvania, south of Pittsburgh. The district encompasses 58 square miles, including the city of Monongahela, the boroughs of Donora, New Eagle and Finleyville, and the townships of Carroll, Union, and Nottingham. According to 2000 federal census data, it served a resident population of 26,933. The area is a mix of Pittsburgh suburbia and rural areas.

The district includes a combination of two former high schools from the area. Monongahela and Donora both had their own junior and senior high schools. These buildings were sold in 2013 and no longer being used in the district. The current high school was built in 1979.

Ringgold School District operates four schools: Ringgold High School, Ringgold Elementary School South and Ringgold Middle School in Carroll Township and Ringgold Elementary School North in Union Township. Ringgold built a new middle school next to the current high school. It opened for the 2017–18 school year and cost $45 million. Construction started in November 2015 and finished in October 2016.

The school district has faced allegations that it is not safe for students, as a result of bullying and the number of fights taking place in schools.
