= Burgettstown Area School District =

School district in Pennsylvania

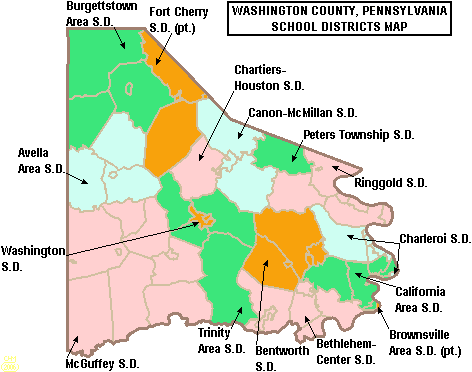

Address
- 100 Bavington Road Burgettstown, Washington, Pennsylvania, 15021; United States
- Coordinates: 40.39678°N 80.38636°W

District information
- Type: Public
- Grades: K-12
- NCES District ID: 4204500

Students and staff
- Enrollment: 1,021 (2020-2021)
- Staff: 90.25 (on an FTE basis)
- Student–teacher ratio: 11.31
- District mascot: Blue Devils

Other information
- Website: www.burgettstown.k12.pa.us

The Burgettstown Area School District is a small, rural public school district located in Washington County, Pennsylvania. It services the Borough of Burgettstown and Hanover Township, Jefferson Township, and Smith Township.

The Burgettstown Area School District encompasses approximately 106 square miles. Per the 2000 federal census data, it serves a resident population of 10,156. In 2009, the district residents' per capita income was $17,861, while the median family income was $47,473. According to District officials, in school year 2020–21, the Burgettstown Area School District provided basic educational services to 1,021 pupils.

The district operates two schools: Burgettstown Middle/High School (6th–12th) and Burgettstown Area Elementary Center (K-5th).
