= Georges Creek (Monongahela River tributary) =

Stream in Pennsylvania, USA

Georges Creek Tributary to Monongahela River
- Location of Georges Creek mouth Georges Creek (Monongahela River tributary) (the United States)

Location
- Country: United States
- State: Pennsylvania
- County: Fayette
- Borough: Smithfield; Fairchance

Physical characteristics
- Source: confluence of Askon and White Rock Hollows
  - location: about 0.5 miles east of Fairchance, Pennsylvania
  - coordinates: 39°49′46″N 079°42′00″W
  - elevation: 1,200 ft (370 m)
- Mouth: Monongahela River
  - location: New Geneva, Pennsylvania
  - coordinates: 39°47′10″N 079°54′58″W
  - elevation: 763 ft (233 m)
- Length: 17.57 mi (28.28 km)
- Basin size: 64.87 square miles (168.0 km^{2})
- Discharge
  - location: Monongahela River
  - average: 95.35 cu ft/s (2.700 m^{3}/s) at mouth with Monongahela River

Basin features
- Progression: generally southwest
- River system: Monongahela River
- Tributaries
  - left: Cave Hollow; Mountain Creek; Hope Hollow
  - right: Muddy Run; York Run; War Branch

Georges Creek is a 17.57 mi (28.28 km) long 4th order tributary to the Monongahela River in Fayette County, Pennsylvania.

== Variant names ==
According to the Geographic Names Information System, it has also been known historically as:

- George Creek
- George's Creek
- Georges Run

== Course ==
Georges Creek forms at the confluence of Askon Hollow and White Rock Hollow about 0.5 miles east of Fairchance in Fayette County. It is joined by the approximately 1.8-mile War Branch about 2.5 miles east-southeast of New Geneva. Georges Creek then flows southwesterly to meet the Monongahela River at New Geneva, Pennsylvania.

== Watershed ==
Georges Creek drains 64.87 square miles (168.0 km^{2}) of area, receives about 44.9 in/year of precipitation, has a topographic wetness index of 370.59, and has an average water temperature of 10.50 °C. The watershed is 58% forested.

== Additional images ==
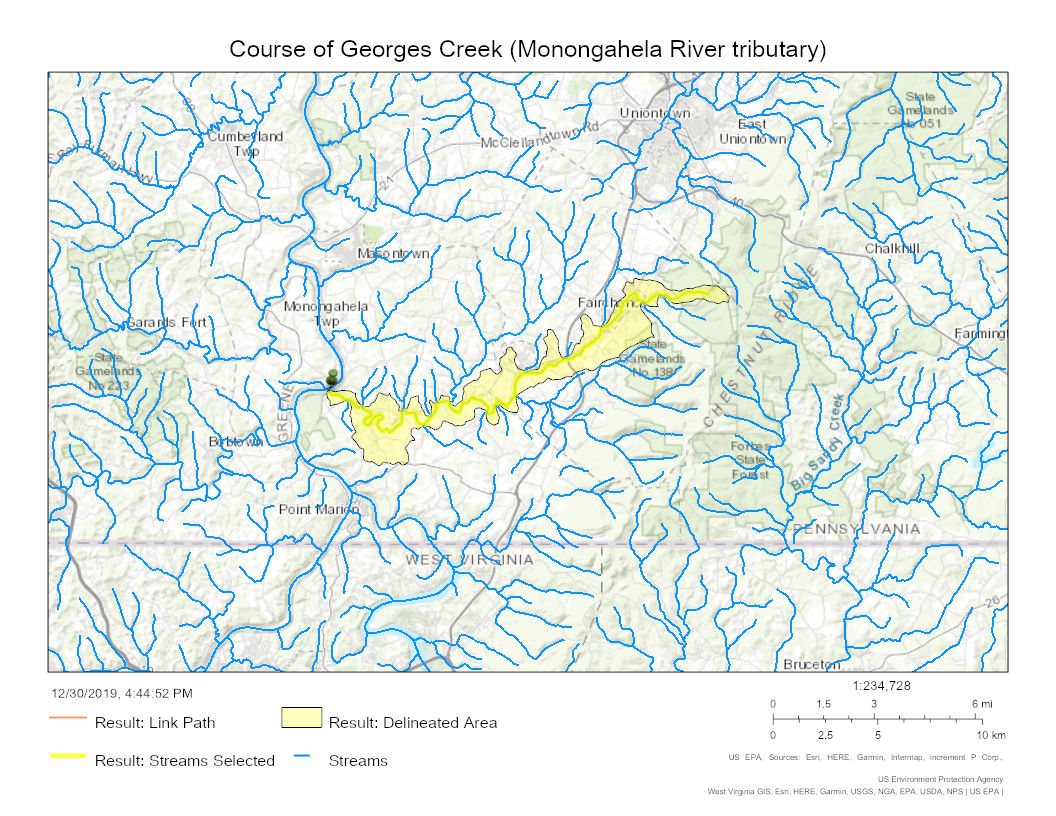
Course of Georges Creek (Monongahela River tributary) in Fayette County, Pennsylvania

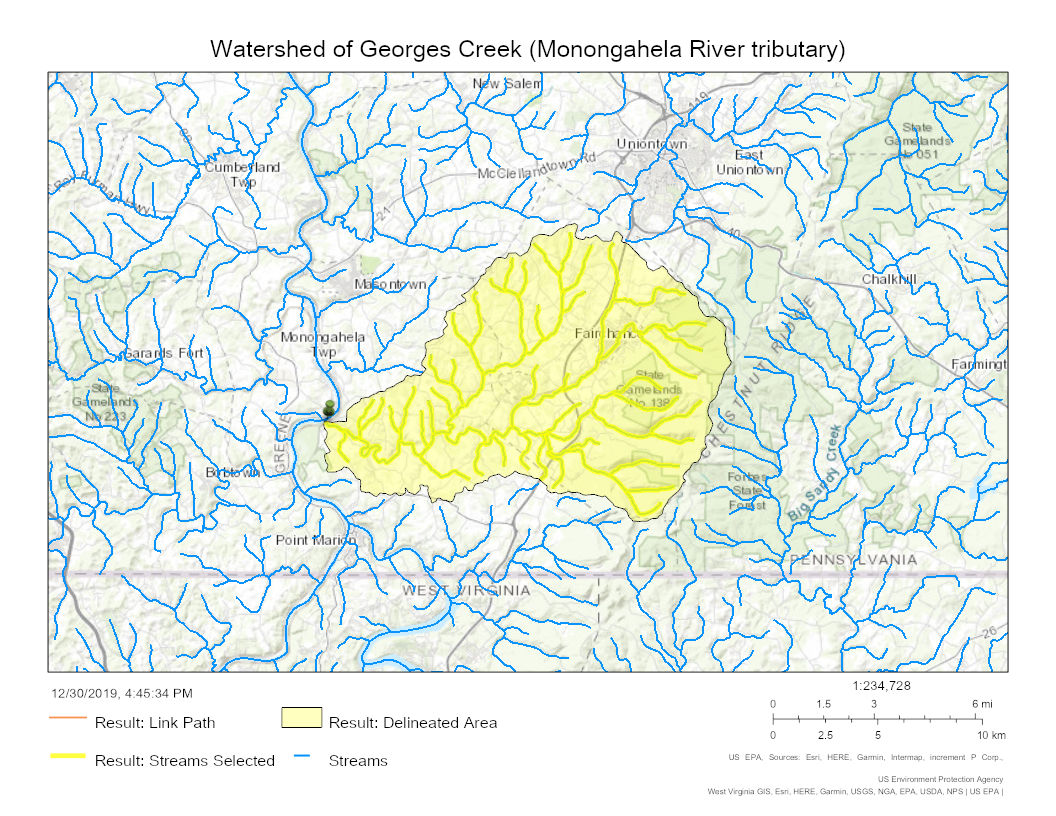
Watershed of Georges Creek (Monongahela River tributary) in Fayette County, Pennsylvania
