= Muddy Run (Georges Creek tributary) =

Stream in Pennsylvania, USA

Muddy Run Tributary to Georges Creek
- Location of Muddy Run mouth Muddy Run (Georges Creek tributary) (the United States)

Location
- Country: United States
- State: Pennsylvania
- County: Fayette
- Borough: Fairchance

Physical characteristics
- Source: Redstone Creek divide
  - location: about 0.25 miles east of Oliphant Furnace, Pennsylvania
  - coordinates: 39°50′28″N 079°42′47″W
  - elevation: 1,320 ft (400 m)
- Mouth: Georges Creek
  - location: Fairchance, Pennsylvania
  - coordinates: 39°48′48″N 079°45′50″W
  - elevation: 1,002 ft (305 m)
- Length: 4.46 mi (7.18 km)
- Basin size: 5.95 square miles (15.4 km^{2})
- Discharge
  - location: Georges Creek
  - average: 8.89 cu ft/s (0.252 m^{3}/s) at mouth with Georges Creek

Basin features
- Progression: west and south
- River system: Monongahela River
- Tributaries
  - left: unnamed tributaries
  - right: unnamed tributaries
- Bridges: Mountain Road, Oliphant Road, Post Office Road, Willey Road, Old Wynne Road, Georges Fairchance Road, Wynn Road, W Church Street

Muddy Run is a 4.46 mi (7.18 km) long 2nd order tributary to Georges Creek in Fayette County, Pennsylvania.

== Course ==
Muddy Run rises about 0.25 miles east of Oliphant Furnace, Pennsylvania, and then flows west and south to join Georges Creek at Fairchance, Pennsylvania.

== Watershed ==
Muddy Run drains 5.95 square miles (15.4 km^{2}) of area, receives about 44.2 in/year of precipitation, has a wetness index of 410.02, and is about 36% forested.

== See also ==
- List of rivers of Pennsylvania
