= Pennsylvania Route 857 =

State highway in Fayette County, Pennsylvania, US

Pennsylvania Route 857

Route information
- Maintained by PennDOT
- Length: 11.047 mi (17.778 km)
- Existed: 1967–present

Major junctions
- South end: CR 857 in Springhill Township
- North end: US 119 / PA 43 in Uniontown

Location
- Country: United States
- State: Pennsylvania
- Counties: Fayette

Highway system
- Pennsylvania State Route System; Interstate; US; State; Scenic; Legislative
← PA 856	→ PA 858

Pennsylvania Route 857 (PA 857) is an 11.04-mile-long (17.77 km) state highway located within Fayette County, Pennsylvania, United States. The southern terminus of the route is at the West Virginia state line southeast of Gans in Springhill Township, where the route continues south as County Route 857, a secondary state highway in West Virginia. The northern terminus is at an interchange with U.S. Route 119 and Pennsylvania Route 43 in Uniontown.

The roadway runs parallel to PA 43 for all but one mile (1.6 km) of its length.

== Route description ==
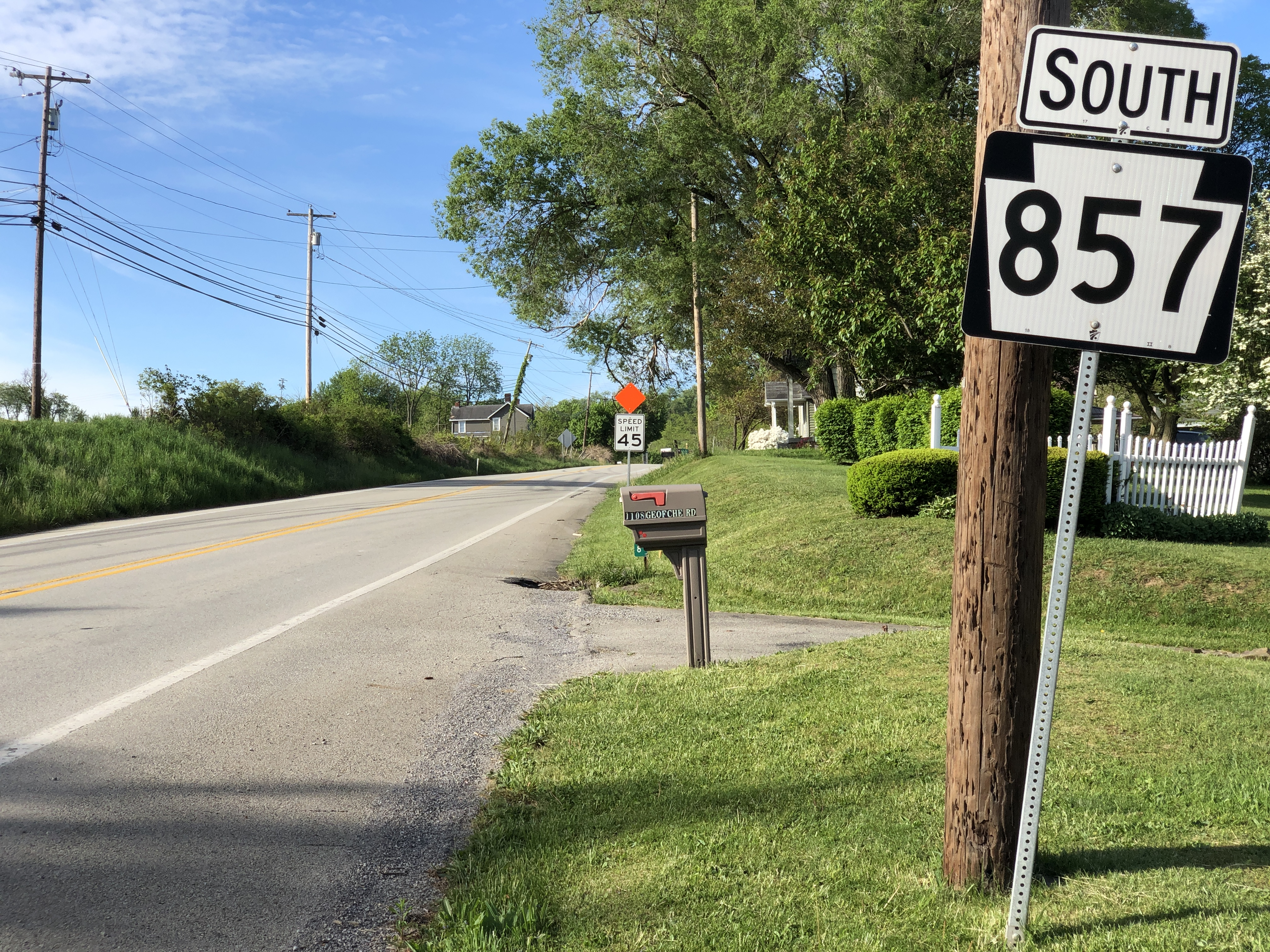
PA 857 southbound in Georges Township

One mile north of the state line in Springhill Township, PA 857 connects to the current southern terminus of the Mon–Fayette Expressway (PA 43) via Gans Road. The route continues north to the Springhill Township community of Haydentown, where it intersects PA 43 at exit 4 via Rubles Mill Road. PA 857 continues northward to the borough of Fairchance, where it interchanges with PA 43 at exit 8 via Big Six Road. PA 857 then continues past Fairchance before terminating at US 119 (Morgantown Road) just east of another interchange with PA 43 in the city of Uniontown.

== History ==
PA 857 is one of several state route numbers to have been assigned, decommissioned and then reassigned later in a different region. The original PA 857 that was commissioned in 1928 ran for 24 miles along the Ohio River from Pittsburgh's Manchester neighborhood to Rochester in Beaver County. The entire segment was first renumbered in 1935 as a realignment of PA 88. In 1961, the northern terminus of PA 88 was truncated to its current location at PA 51 in the Pittsburgh's Overbrook neighborhood; the remaining segment of former PA 857/PA 88 from the northern end of the West End Bridge to New Castle was renumbered one more time as present-day PA 65.

PA 857 was assigned to its current Fayette County location on the former PA 319 (1936–1946) in 1967. The highway, in conjunction with a connecting secondary road in West Virginia, was designated to provide another route between Uniontown and Morgantown, West Virginia along what was called "the back road to Morgantown". The road was widened and resurfaced in summer 1966.

== Major intersections ==
The entire route is in Fayette County.

Location	mi	km	Destinations	Notes
Springhill Township	0.000	0.000	CR 857 south (Fairchance Road)	West Virginia border; southern terminus
Georges Township	11.047	17.778	US 119 (Morgantown Road) / PA 43 to US 40 – Uniontown, Hopwood, Smithfield	Northern terminus
1.000 mi = 1.609 km; 1.000 km = 0.621 mi
