= Pennsylvania Route 43 (disambiguation) =

Pennsylvania Route 43 may refer to:

- Mon–Fayette Expressway, which is signed as Pennsylvania Turnpike 43 in its tolled sections.
- U.S. Route 22 in Pennsylvania, which was signed in some segments as Pennsylvania Route 43 in the 1920s and 1930s.
- Schuylkill Expressway, which was signed as Pennsylvania Route 43 in the 1950s and 1960s, currently signed as part of Interstate 76.
