= War Branch (Georges Creek tributary) =

Stream in Pennsylvania, USA

War Branch Tributary to Georges Creek
- Location of War Branch mouth War Branch (Georges Creek tributary) (the United States)

Location
- Country: United States
- State: Pennsylvania
- County: Fayette

Physical characteristics
- Source: Jacobs Creek divide
  - location: pond about 0.25 miles southwest of Old Frame, Pennsylvania
  - coordinates: 39°48′10″N 079°52′20″W
  - elevation: 1,070 ft (330 m)
- Mouth: Georges Creek
  - location: about 2.5 miles east-southeast of New Geneva, Pennsylvania
  - coordinates: 39°46′40″N 079°52′31″W
  - elevation: 840 ft (260 m)
- Length: 1.79 mi (2.88 km)
- Basin size: 1.56 square miles (4.0 km^{2})
- Discharge
  - location: Georges Creek
  - average: 2.17 cu ft/s (0.061 m^{3}/s) at mouth with Georges Creek

Basin features
- Progression: south-southwest
- River system: Monongahela River
- Tributaries
  - left: unnamed tributaries
  - right: unnamed tributaries
- Bridges: War Branch Road

War Branch is a 1.79 mi (2.88 km) long 2nd order tributary to Georges Creek in Fayette County, Pennsylvania.

== Variant names ==
According to the Geographic Names Information System, it has also been known historically as:

- War Branch Run

== Course ==
War Branch rises in a pond about 0.25 miles southwest of Old Frame, Pennsylvania, and then flows south-southwest to join Georges Creek about 2.5 miles east-southeast of New Geneva.

== Watershed ==
War Branch drains 1.56 square miles (4.0 km^{2}) of area, receives about 42.9 in/year of precipitation, has a wetness index of 332.74, and is about 59% forested.

== See also ==
- List of rivers of Pennsylvania
