= Mountain Creek (Georges Creek tributary) =

Stream in Pennsylvania, USA

Mountain Creek Tributary to Georges Creek
- Location of Mountain Creek mouth Mountain Creek (Georges Creek tributary) (the United States)

Location
- Country: United States
- State: Pennsylvania
- County: Fayette

Physical characteristics
- Source: Laurel Run divide
  - location: about 4 miles east of Haydentown, Pennsylvania
  - coordinates: 39°47′46″N 079°43′04″W
  - elevation: 2,460 ft (750 m)
- Mouth: Georges Creek
  - location: about 1.5 miles south of Smithfield, Pennsylvania
  - coordinates: 39°47′01″N 079°48′42″W
  - elevation: 940 ft (290 m)
- Length: 6.21 mi (9.99 km)
- Basin size: 16.70 square miles (43.3 km^{2})
- Discharge
  - location: Georges Creek
  - average: 30.64 cu ft/s (0.868 m^{3}/s) at mouth with Georges Creek

Basin features
- Progression: generally west
- River system: Monongahela River
- Tributaries
  - left: unnamed tributaries
  - right: unnamed tributaries
- Bridges: Hardin Hollow Road, Barton Hollow Road, PA 857, Haydentown Hill Road, PA 43, Chess Road, Rubles Mill Road, Gans Woodbridge Road, Ringer Road

Mountain Creek is a 6.21 mi (9.99 km) long 3rd order tributary to Georges Creek in Fayette County, Pennsylvania.

== Course ==
Mountain Creek rises about 4 miles east of Haydentown, Pennsylvania, and then flows westerly to join Georges Creek about 1.5 miles south of Smithfield.

== Watershed ==
Mountain Creek drains 16.70 square miles (43.3 km^{2}) of area, receives about 47.9 in/year of precipitation, has a wetness index of 354.36, and is about 76% forested.

== See also ==
- List of rivers of Pennsylvania
