= Friendship Hill =

U.S. National Historic Site in Pennsylvania

- Friendship Hill National Historic Site; Albert Gallatin House
- U.S. National Register of Historic Places
- U.S. National Historic Landmark
- U.S. National Historic Site
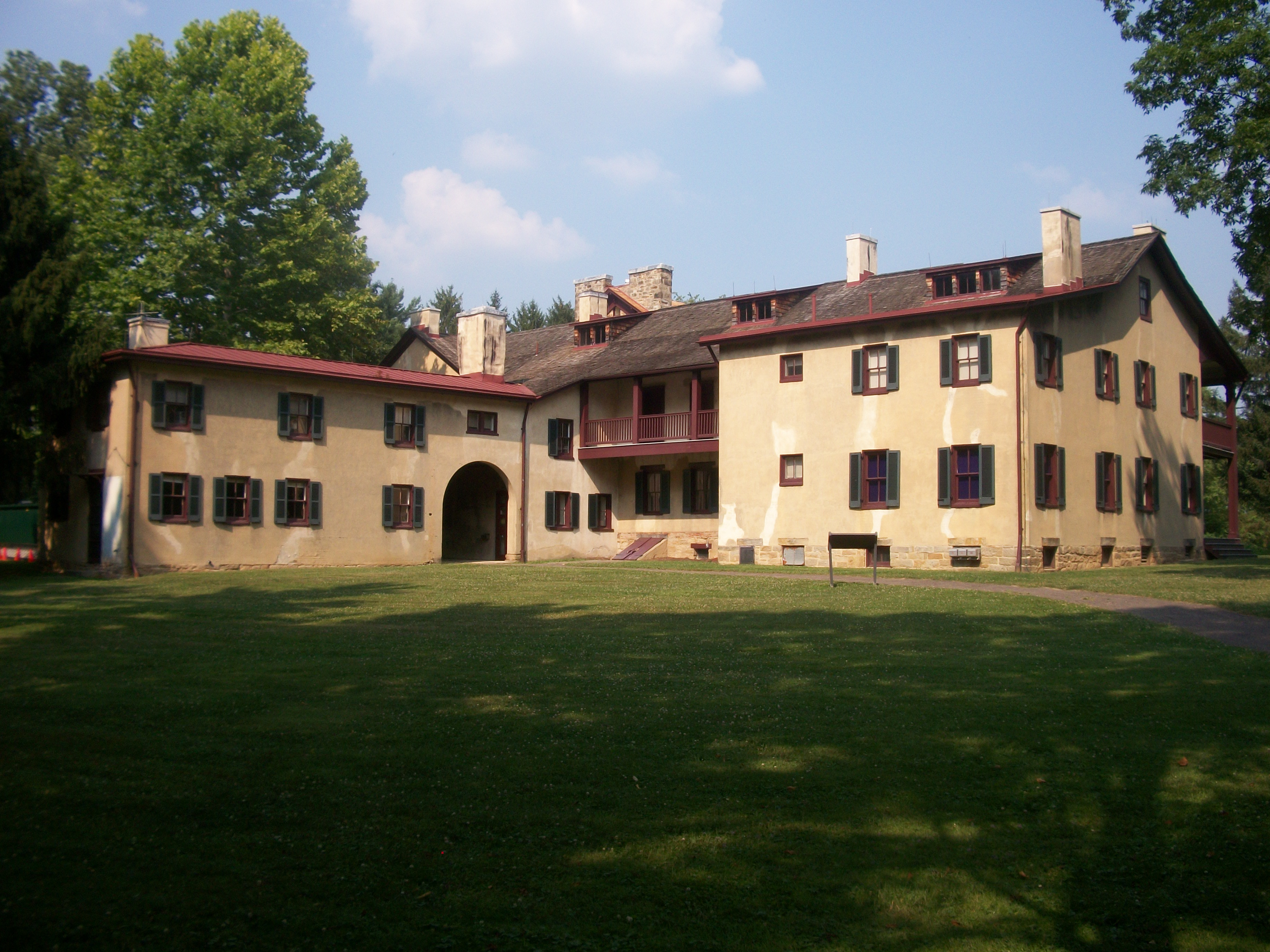
- The house of Albert Gallatin at Friendship Hill National Historic Site

- Location within Pennsylvania Location within the United States
- Location: Springhill Township, Fayette County, PA, United States
- Nearest city: Pittsburgh, Pennsylvania
- Coordinates: 39°46′40″N 79°55′45″W
- Area: 675 acres (273 ha)
- Visitation: 18,080 (2025)
- Website: Friendship Hill National Historic Site
- NRHP reference No.: 66000663

Significant dates
- Added to NRHP: October 15, 1966
- Designated NHL: January 12, 1965
- Designated NHS: November 10, 1978

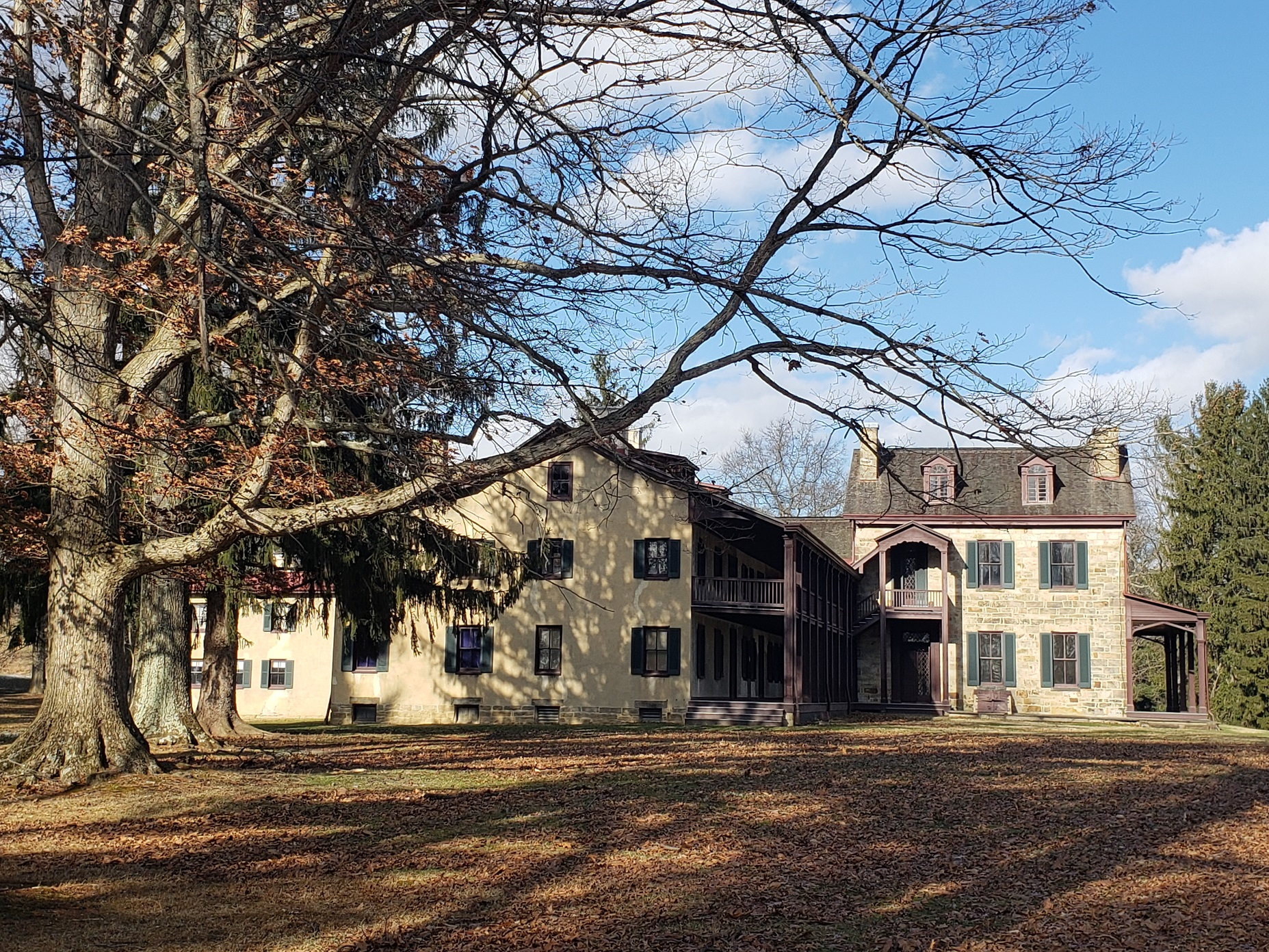
Side view of the estate during winter

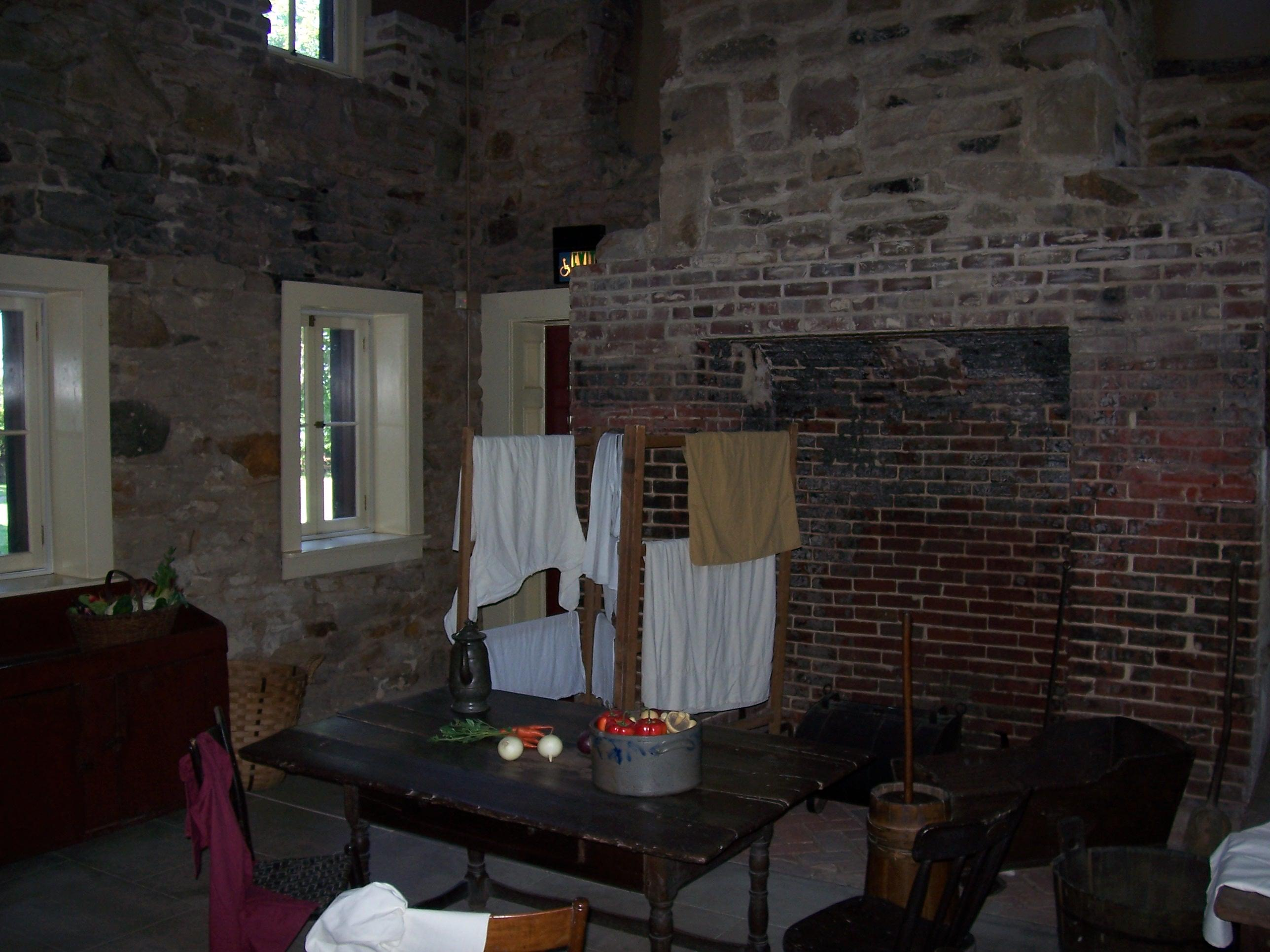
Interior view of the estate

Friendship Hill was the home of early American politician and statesman Albert Gallatin (1761–1849). Gallatin was a U.S. Congressman, the longest-serving Secretary of the Treasury under two presidents, and ambassador to France and Great Britain. The house overlooks the Monongahela River near Point Marion, Pennsylvania, about 50 miles (80 km) south of Pittsburgh.

It is maintained by the National Park Service as Friendship Hill National Historic Site and is open to the public.

== Description ==
Friendship Hill is a parcel of land 675 acres (273 ha) in size, located on the east bank of the Monongahela River between New Geneva and Point Marion in rural southwestern Pennsylvania. The property's main house, also known as the Albert Gallatin House, is located atop a bluff that is the high point of the property.

The house is made up of seven sections. The earliest of these is the original brick house built in 1789. This structure was constructed in the Federal style with a Flemish bond. Along the north side of the brick house, a simple frame dwelling was added in 1798. The Stone House was the next structure added by Gallatin in 1823; this is a 3 1/2-story structure, the largest section of the total house. This was the only structure which Gallatin did not build and oversee himself. This portion was built and overseen by one of his sons, Albert Rolaz Gallatin. A stone kitchen was added in 1824, which was the last addition of the Gallatin era.

The rest of the additions include a State Dining Room in 1895, a south bedroom wing completed in 1902, and the servants' quarters added in 1903. These portions were built by the later owners of the house.

== History ==
Albert Gallatin, a native of Geneva, Switzerland, came to the United States in 1780. He became involved in real estate speculation in western Pennsylvania and Virginia not long afterward, and purchased the land and house that became Friendship Hill in 1788. He sold the property in 1832, settling in New York City. His long period of public service included serving as the United States Secretary of the Treasury under Presidents Thomas Jefferson and James Madison, and as United States Ambassador to France.

The house was designated a National Historic Landmark on January 12, 1965, and was listed on the National Register of Historic Places when the register was established on October 15, 1966, at which time the house was privately owned. The national historic site was established on November 10, 1978, and is administered under Fort Necessity National Battlefield.

== Gallery ==
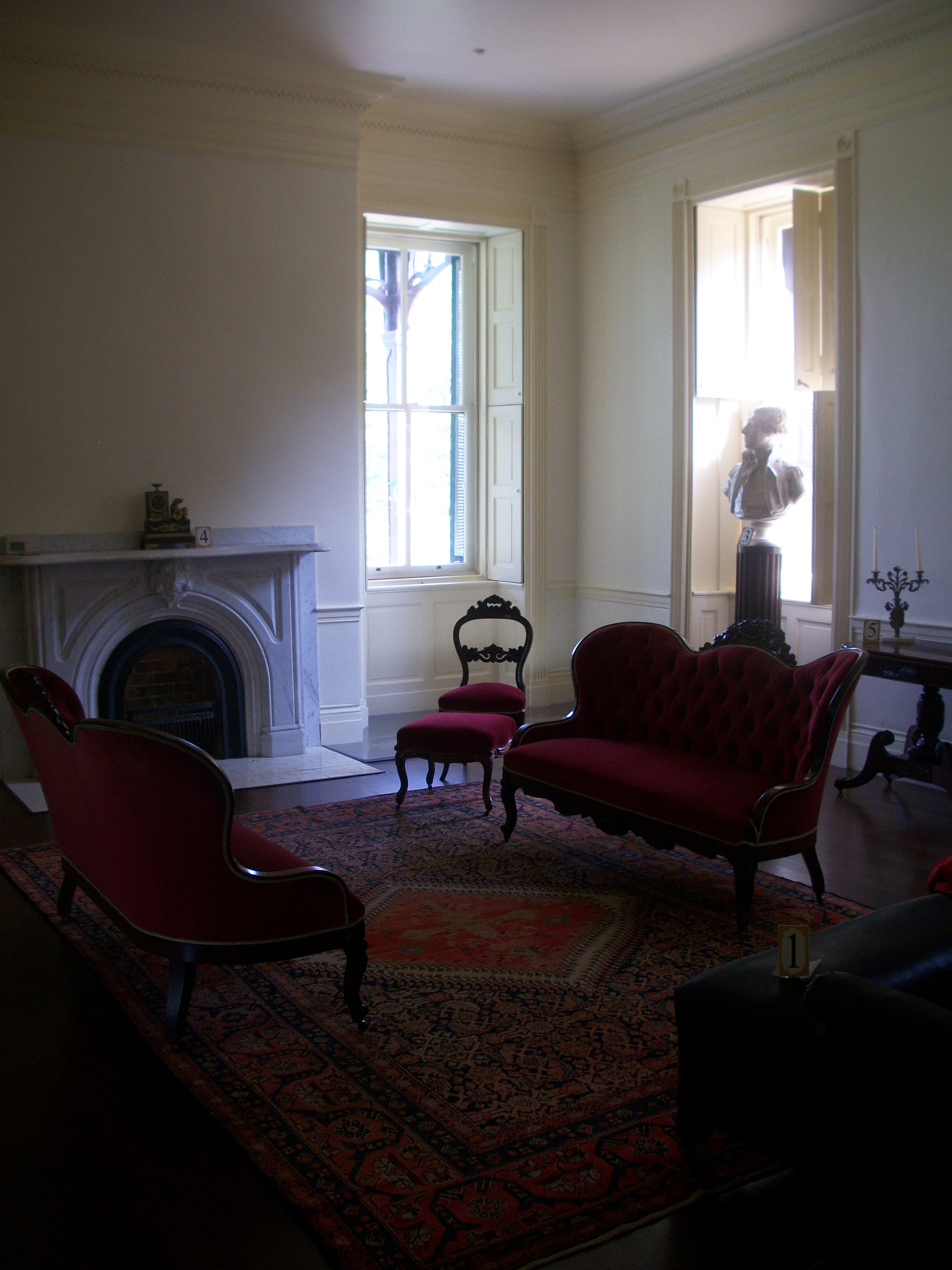
Sitting room in the home

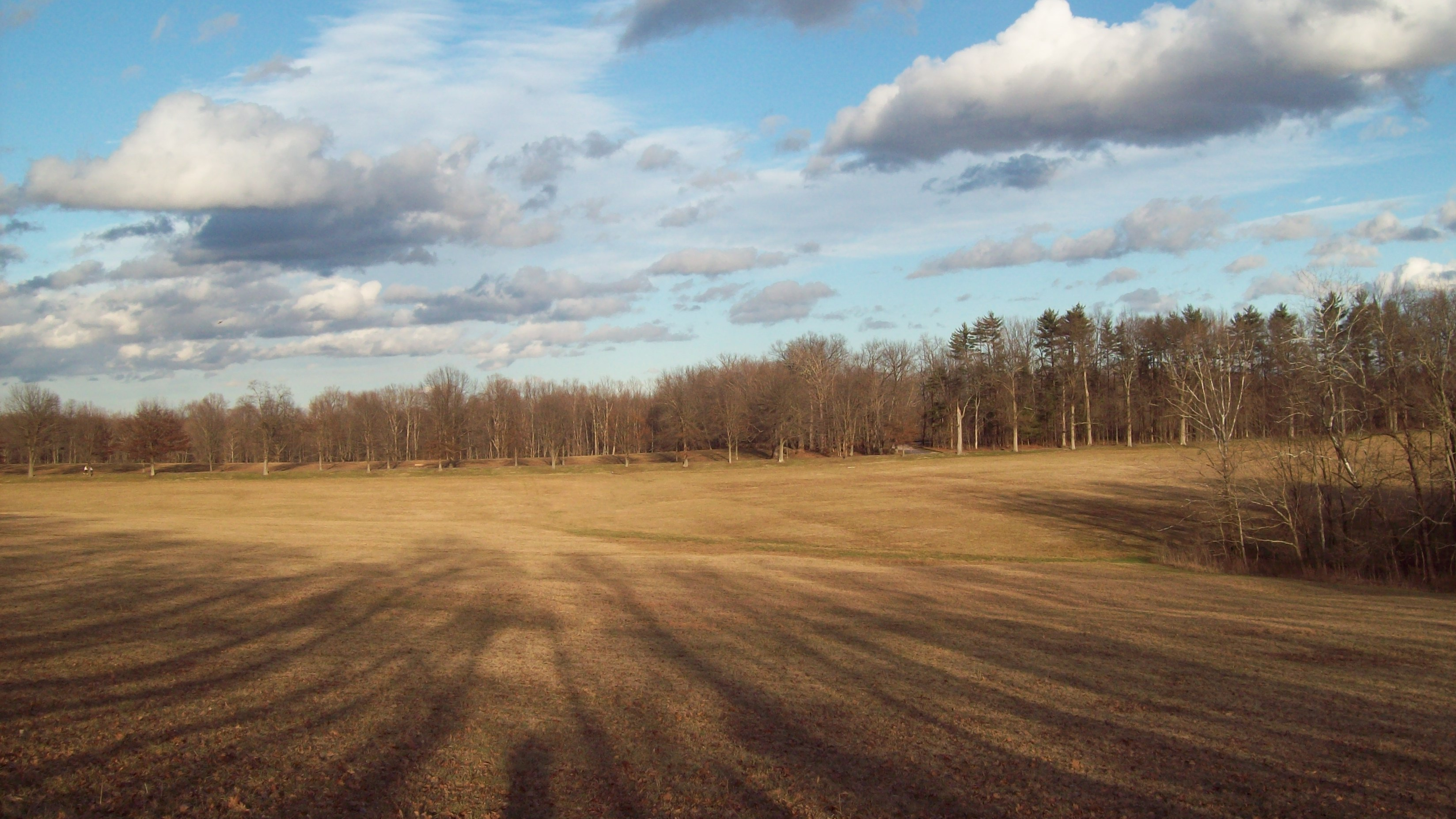
Nearby fields

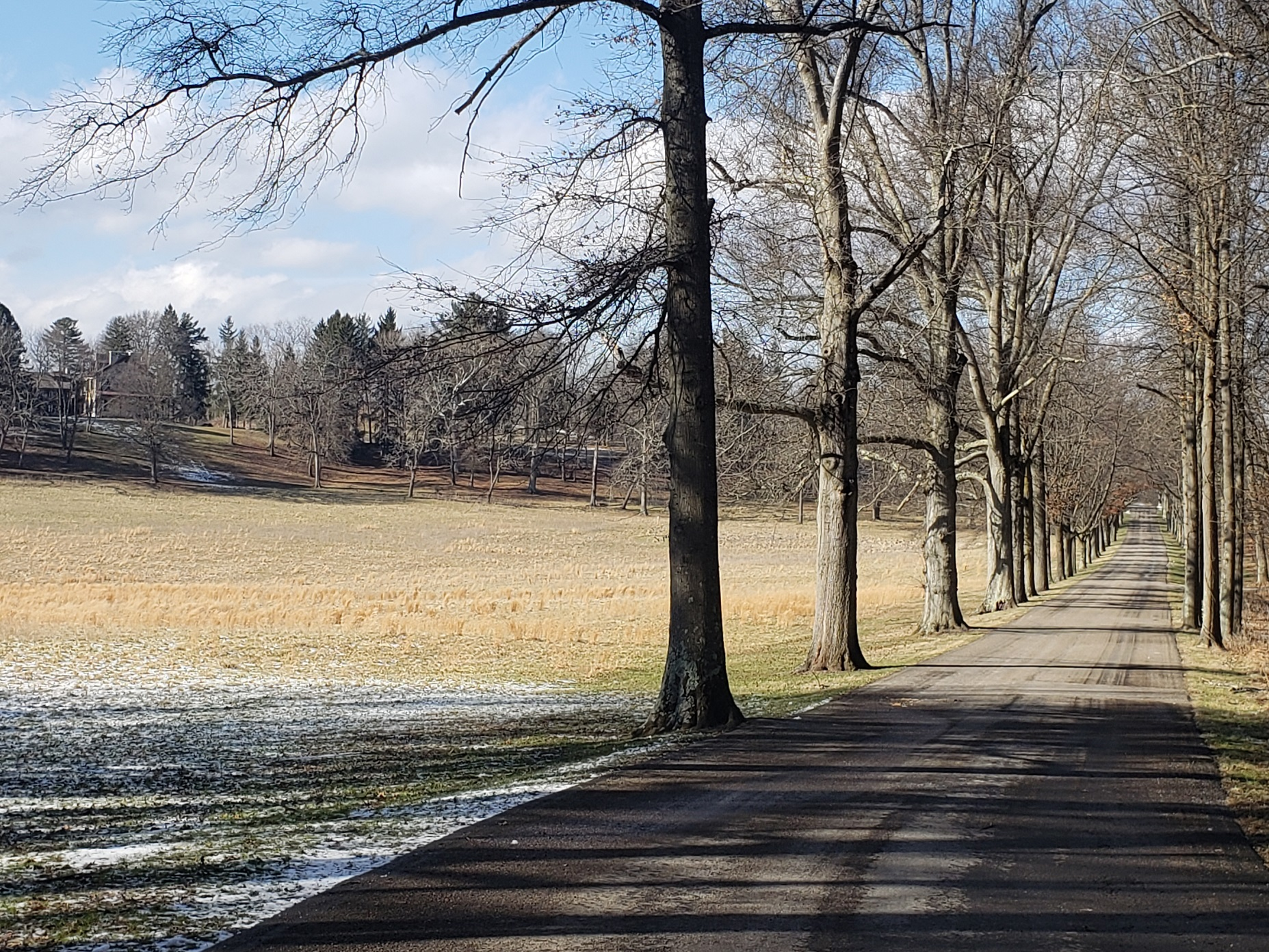
Entrance to Friendship Hill, with the estate visible on far left

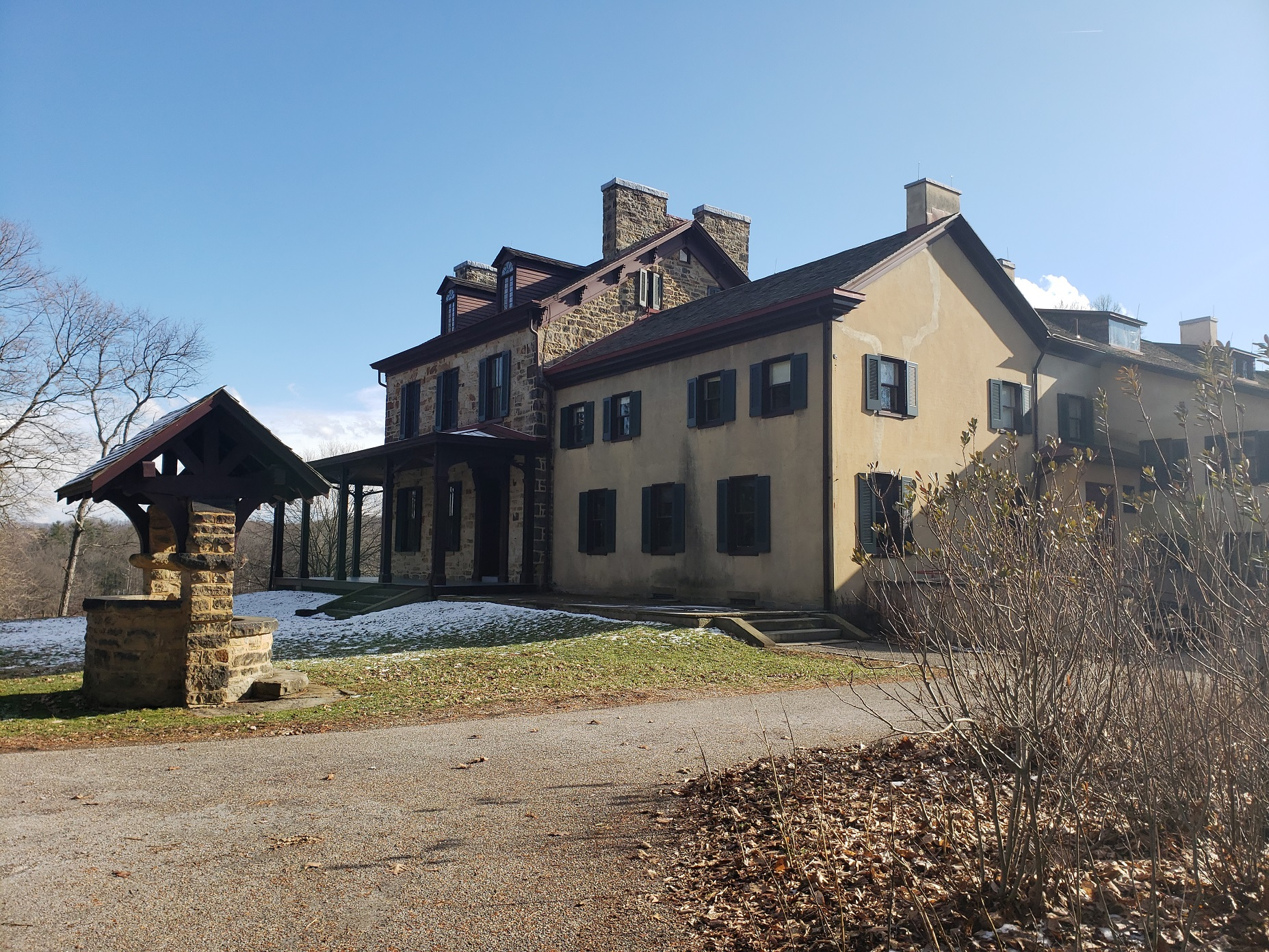
Front view of estate during winter

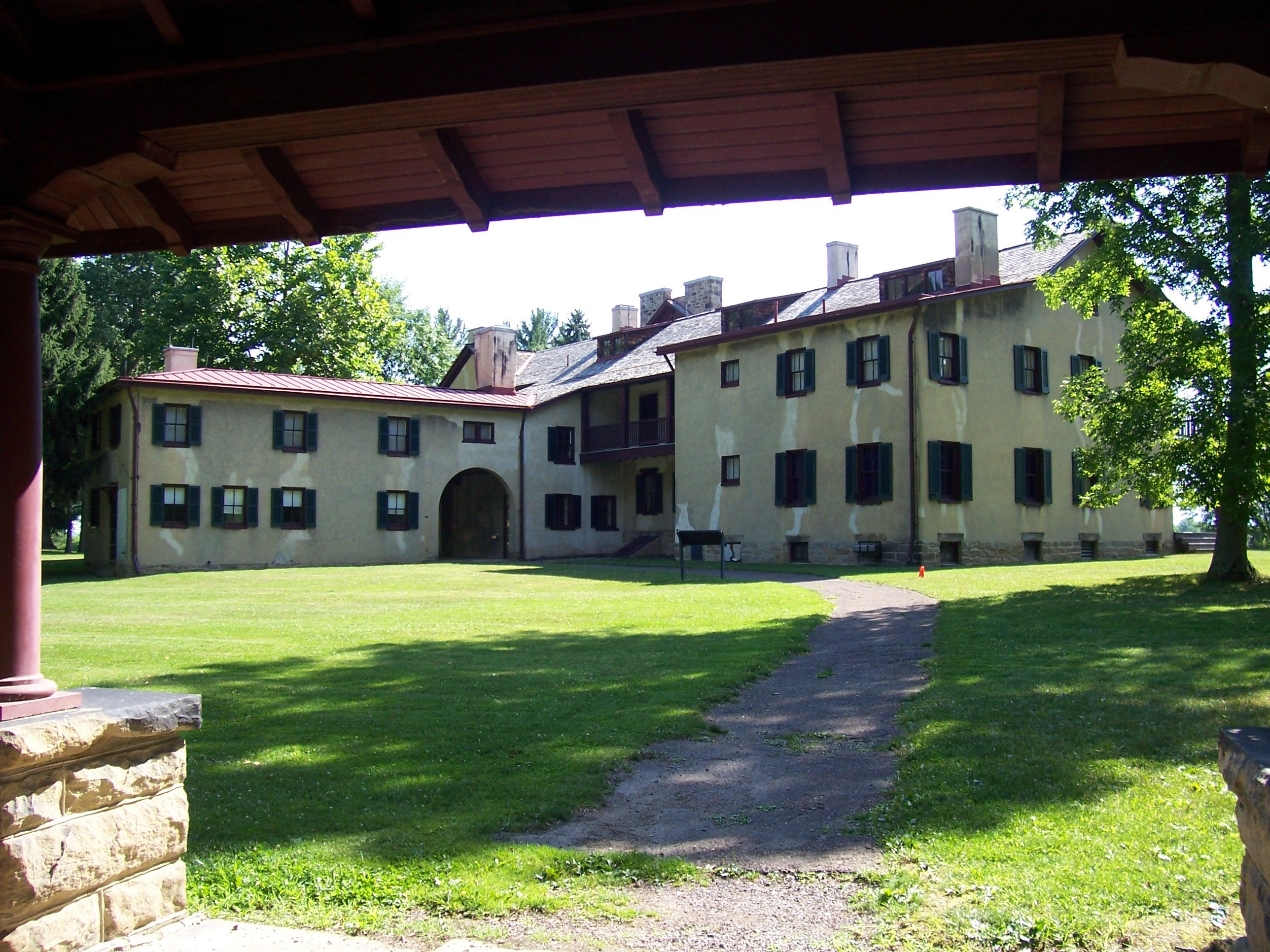
Estate as seen from the rear during summer

== See also ==
- List of National Historic Landmarks in Pennsylvania
- National Register of Historic Places listings in Fayette County, Pennsylvania
