= York Run (Georges Creek tributary) =

Stream in Pennsylvania, USA

York Run Tributary to Georges Creek
- Location of York Run mouth York Run (Georges Creek tributary) (the United States)

Location
- Country: United States
- State: Pennsylvania
- County: Fayette

Physical characteristics
- Source: Coal Lick Run divide
  - location: about 0.75 miles southwest of Chadville, Pennsylvania
  - coordinates: 39°51′55″N 079°46′06″W
  - elevation: 1,140 ft (350 m)
- Mouth: Georges Creek
  - location: about 2.5 miles southwest of Smithfield, Pennsylvania
  - coordinates: 39°46′54″N 079°50′56″W
  - elevation: 889 ft (271 m)
- Length: 5.89 mi (9.48 km)
- Basin size: 17.16 square miles (44.4 km^{2})
- Discharge
  - location: Georges Creek
  - average: 23.21 cu ft/s (0.657 m^{3}/s) at mouth with Georges Creek

Basin features
- Progression: southwest
- River system: Monongahela River
- Tributaries
  - left: unnamed tributaries
  - right: Croziers Run
- Bridges: Bucklick Road, Shady Side Road, York Run Road, Sleepy Hollow Road, Smithfield Highhouse Road, Smithfield Avenue, Church Street Ext, New Geneva Road, Valley School Road, Old Frame Road

York Run is a 5.89 mi (9.48 km) long 3rd order tributary to Georges Creek in Fayette County, Pennsylvania.

== Variant names ==
According to the Geographic Names Information System, it has also been known historically as:

- York's Run
- Yorks Run

== Course ==
York Run rises about 0.75 miles (1,2 km) southwest of Chadville, Pennsylvania, and then flows southwest to join Georges Creek about 2.5 miles (4.0 km) southwest of Smithfield.

== Watershed ==
York Run drains 17.16 square miles (44.4 km^{2}) of area, receives about 43.3 in/year (1100 mm/a) of precipitation, has a wetness index of 373.76, and is about 48% forested.

== See also ==
- List of rivers of Pennsylvania
