= Mon–Fayette Expressway =

Highway in West Virginia and Pennsylvania, US

- Completed section highlighted in red Proposed section highlighted in dark blue

Route information
- Maintained by WVDOH, PennDOT, & PTC
- Length: 59.4 mi (95.6 km)
- Existed: 1977–present
- Component highways: WV 43 in West Virginia; PA Turnpike 43 from West Virginia state line to Uniontown, PA; PA 43 in Uniontown, PA; PA Turnpike 43 from Uniontown, PA to Jefferson Hills, PA

Major junctions
- South end: I-68 in Cheat Lake, WV
- US 119 / PA 857 in Uniontown, PA; PA 21 in Uniontown, PA; US 40 / US 40 Bus. in Uniontown, PA; US 119 / PA 51 in Uniontown, PA; US 40 near Brownsville, PA; US 40 / PA 88 near West Brownsville, PA; I-70 in Fallowfield Township, PA; PA 136 near New Eagle, PA
- North end: PA 51 in Jefferson Hills, PA

Location
- Country: United States
- States: West Virginia, Pennsylvania
- Counties: WV: Monongalia; PA: Fayette, Washington, Allegheny

Highway system
- West Virginia State Highway System; Interstate; US; State
- Pennsylvania State Route System; Interstate; US; State; Scenic; Legislative
← WV 42	WV	→ WV 44
← PA 42	PA	→ PA 44

The Mon–Fayette Expressway, commonly referred to as "Toll 43", is a partially-completed controlled-access toll road that is planned to eventually link Interstate 68 near Morgantown, West Virginia, with Interstate 376 near Monroeville, Pennsylvania. The ultimate goal of the highway is to provide a high speed north–south connection between Morgantown and the eastern side of Pittsburgh while revitalizing economically distressed Monongahela River Valley towns in Fayette and Washington counties, serving as an alternative to Interstate 79 to the west, as well as relieving congestion on the PA 51 alignment from Pittsburgh to Uniontown.

Although it is being built to Interstate Highway standards, there is currently no indication that the freeway will become part of the Interstate Highway System. At least one proposal was to give it the Interstate 97 (I-97) designation (unrelated to the existing I-97 in Maryland), while others have been to make it a spur route of I-68. The highway currently uses state highway designations, as it is not an upgrade to an existing U.S. Route for its entire length, though it does parallel and at times run concurrent with U.S. Route 40 and U.S. Route 119 for portions of its length. The route, running through two states and with three different agencies responsible for maintenance, consistently uses the number 43 throughout its length for familiarity, and is thus officially designated as either West Virginia Route 43 (WV 43), Pennsylvania Route 43 (PA 43), and PA Turnpike 43. Most of the route is maintained by the Pennsylvania Turnpike Commission, while the Pennsylvania Department of Transportation maintains small portions of the highway near Uniontown, and the West Virginia Division of Highways maintains the short section in West Virginia.

South of West Mifflin, the Mon–Fayette Expressway is complete. Construction on the current section to complete the highway as far as Duquesne began on May 22, 2023, with the first section opening on November 20, 2026. Plans existing to extend the road north across the Monongahela River to I-376 and Monroeville are complete but the project is still awaiting funding.

== Route description ==
=== West Virginia ===
West Virginia Route 43
- Location: Cheat Lake, West Virginia
- Length: 4.2 mi (6.8 km)

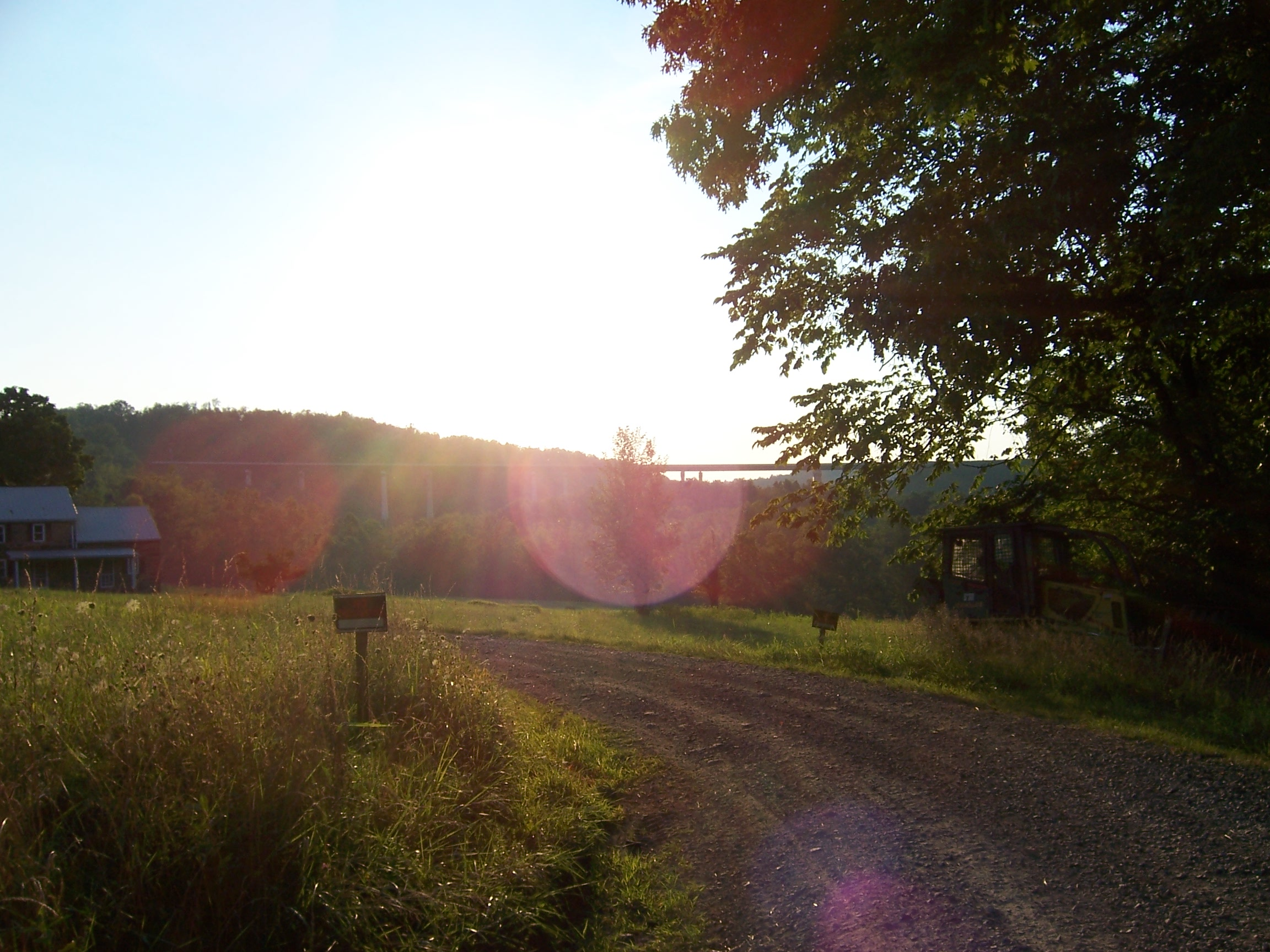
Sunset view of Rubles Run Bridge, the northernmost bridge on WV 43. The Mason–Dixon line runs across the northern point of the bridge.

The Mon–Fayette Expressway begins at a diamond interchange with I-68 and local roads in Cheat Lake in Monongalia County, West Virginia. There are plans to upgrade this interchange into a full freeway interchange once traffic volumes require it. The highway heads north as a four-lane freeway signed as WV 43, passing near some residential development and coming to an interchange with Bowers Lane that provides access to County Route 857. Following this, WV 43 curves northeast and runs through forested areas, turning to the north.

=== Pennsylvania ===
Pennsylvania Route 43
- Location: Fairchance to Oliver, Pennsylvania
- Length: 8 mi (13 km)

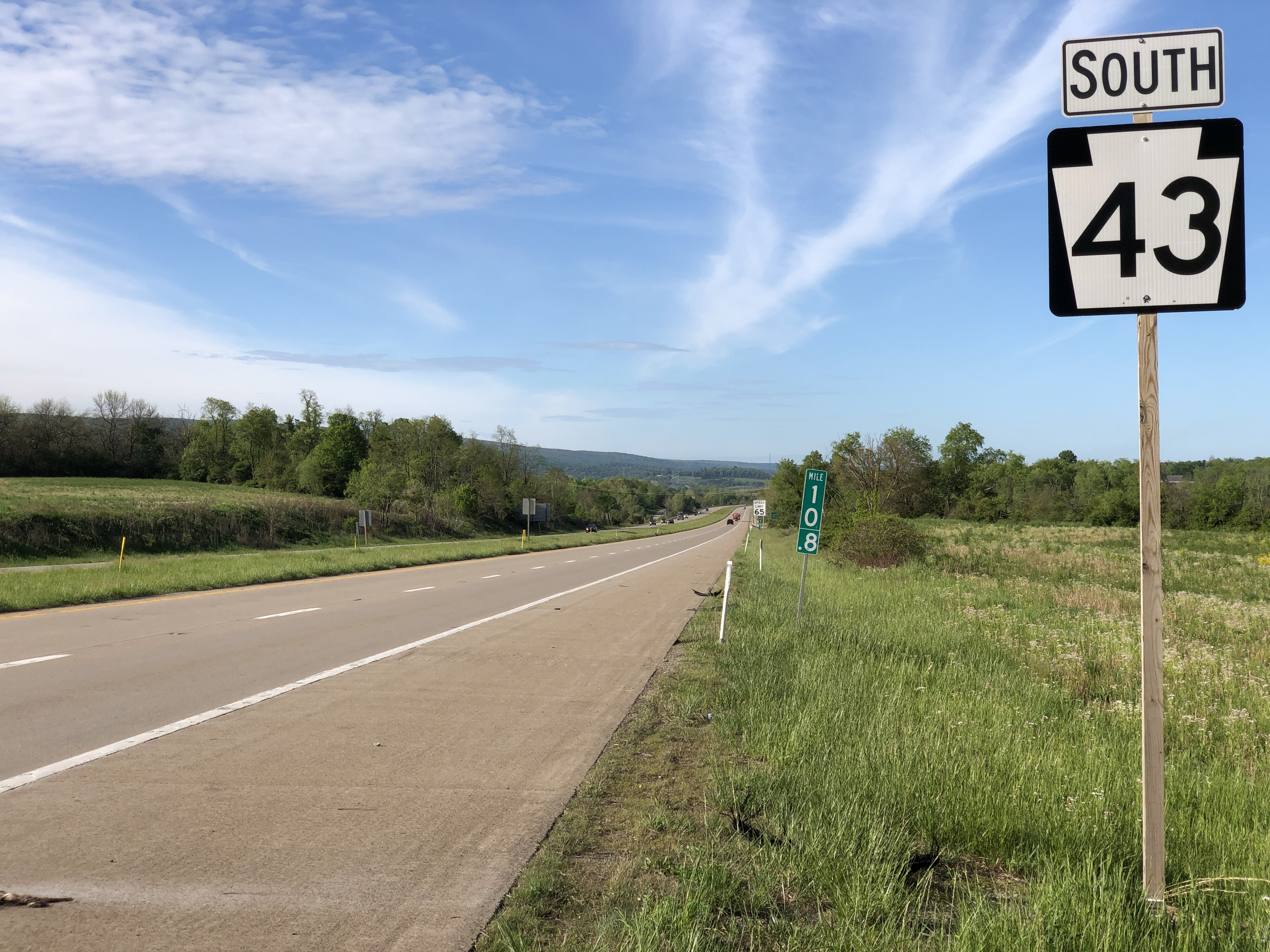
PA 43 southbound past US 119 in Georges Township

The Mon–Fayette Expressway crosses the Mason–Dixon line into Pennsylvania, where it becomes PA Turnpike 43, which is maintained by the Pennsylvania Turnpike Commission (PTC). The freeway heads through Springhill Township in Fayette County, passing through forested areas with some fields. The first interchange in the state is at Gans Road, which provides access to US 119 to the west and PA 857 to the east.

Pennsylvania Route 43
- Location: Springhill to Fairchance, Pennsylvania and Oliver to Jefferson Hills, Pennsylvania
- Length: 42 mi (68 km)

Here, PA Turnpike 43 becomes a toll road and continues northeast through more rural areas, where it crosses into Georges Township and comes to a diamond interchange with Rubles Mill Road that accesses PA 857 a short distance to the east. Past this interchange, the highway comes to the Fairchance mainline toll plaza before it curves north and then northwest. The route passes to the west of an industrial park before reaching an interchange with Big Six Road which provides access to US 119 and PA 857.

At this point, the Mon–Fayette Expressway becomes toll-free and is maintained by the Pennsylvania Department of Transportation (PennDOT), signed as PA 43. The roadway continues through farmland and woodland as it bypasses Fairchance to the west. Farther north, PA 43 comes to an interchange with US 119 and the northern terminus of PA 857, at which point the road merges into the Uniontown bypass and officially becomes US 119. Signs direct traffic to follow US 119 to continue to Toll 43, so the 43 number is unofficially continuous but in reality exists in two separate sections separated by the 4 miles (6.4 km) around Uniontown. A short distance later, 43 traffic on US 119 crosses into South Union Township and reaches an interchange with the US 40 freeway, at which point US 40 merges with US 119. These routes bypass Uniontown to the west on the freeway, running between farmland and woods to the west and residential neighborhoods to the east. The highway comes to a diamond interchange with Walnut Hill Road, where it curves northwest and passes near more homes. The route then curves northeast and reaches a trumpet interchange providing access to PA 21 in a commercial area. A short distance later, the freeway comes to an interchange with the western terminus of US 40 Business, at which point US 40 splits to the northwest. US 119 and the traffic following the unsigned PA 43 continue northeast on the freeway into North Union Township, where they run between rural areas to the northwest and residential areas to the southeast. Here PA Turnpike 43, again a toll road maintained by the PTC, begins again and splits from US 119 at an interchange that also serves PA 51.

The Expressway heads northwest through rural areas with some nearby development. The highway reaches a diamond interchange with Old Pittsburgh Road which provides connections to US 40 and PA 51. Past this interchange, the tollway crosses into Menallen Township and runs through a mix of farmland and woodland. Farther northwest, PA Turnpike 43 comes to an interchange at Keisterville-Upper Middletown Road, which provides access to US 40 to the southwest. The Mon–Fayette Expressway enters Redstone Township, where it reaches the Redstone mainline toll gantry. The highway continues northwest through rural land and comes to a diamond interchange with US 40. Following this, the toll road heads northwest through rural areas to the south of Brownsville, crossing the Dunlap Creek into Luzerne Township. Here, PA Turnpike 43 reaches the Telegraph Road exit and curves to the northwest.

The Mon–Fayette Expressway crosses the Monongahela River on the Mon–Fayette Expressway Bridge into Centerville in Washington County, where it curves north and comes to an interchange with PA 88. At this point, the road becomes toll-free again for the next three interchanges because this was the original section of the highway built by PennDOT with state funds before being handed over to the Turnpike Commission to have the remainder built with toll revenue. PA 88 also joins the freeway for a short concurrency, with the road heading northeast through forested areas. The highway comes to a cloverleaf interchange with US 40, at which point PA 88 splits to the east to follow US 40 and PA Turnpike 43 continues northeast on the Mon–Fayette Expressway, entering California. The road continues through fields and woods, reaching an interchange with Malden Road that provides access to PA 88 Truck. The tollway continues north through dense woodland, bypassing the center of California to the west. The median widens as the highway comes to the exit for Elco Hill Road, after which it once again becomes a toll road. The median narrows again as PA Turnpike 43 curves northwest and comes to the California mainline toll plaza. A short distance later, the Mon–Fayette Expressway enters Fallowfield Township and comes to a cloverleaf interchange serving I-70.

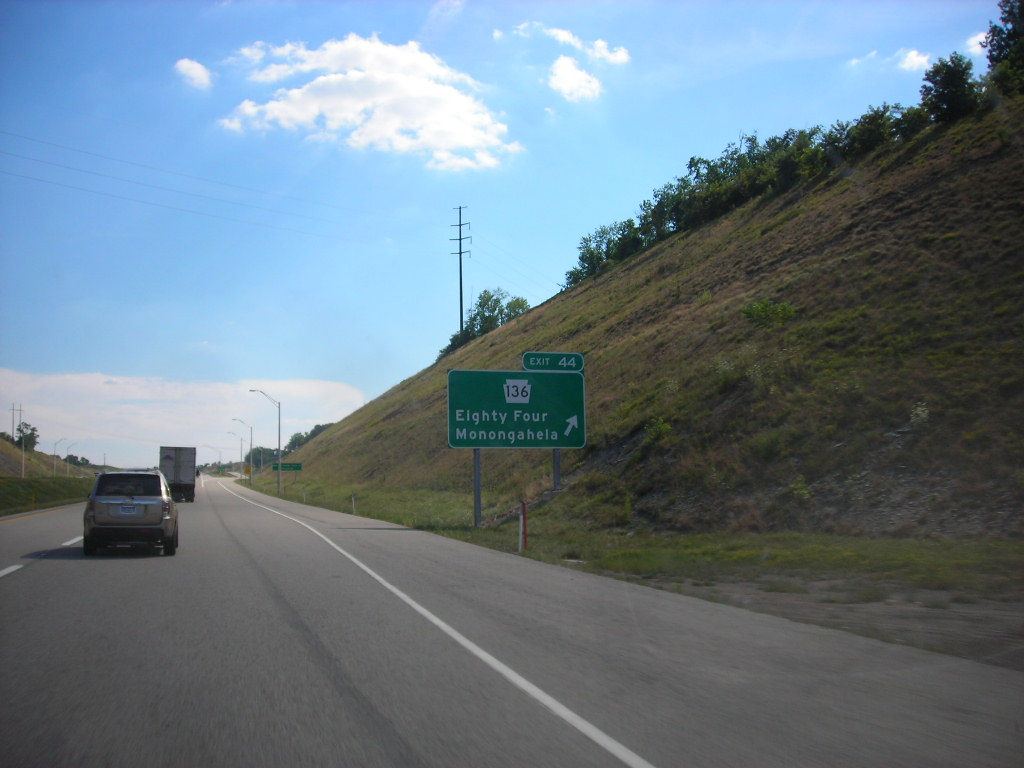
PA 136 exit sign along PA Turnpike 43 in Carroll Township

Past this interchange, the toll road winds north through more woodland and reaches a diamond interchange at Coyle Curtain Road, which provides access to the communities of Charleroi and Donora to the east. PA Turnpike 43 heads into Carroll Township and makes a sharp curve to the west, continuing through more rural areas. The tollway curves north again near a mine and comes to the PA 136 exit. The Mon–Fayette Expressway crosses the Mingo Creek Viaduct into Union Township and continues north through wooded areas with some fields and mines. Farther north, the highway comes to a diamond interchange serving Finleyville-Elrama Road. Past this interchange, PA Turnpike 43 curves to the northeast. The tollway enters Jefferson Hills in Allegheny County, where it continues through more rural areas. The toll road reaches the Jefferson Hills toll gantry and continues northeast crossing a set of large bridges which are part of the interchange with a connector road to PA 51. This interchange was the northern terminus of construction until recently. After the PA 51 interchange the road continues north and parallels the Monongahela River on hilltops through the suburban areas of West Mifflin, crossing over several deep valleys. In order to save money on the construction, the median was designed and built with a concrete barrier, rather than a wide grass berm which was the standard of construction on previous sections of the roadway. Exit 57 in West Mifflin is for Camp Hollow Road, which provides access to nearby Allegheny County Airport and U.S. Steel's Irvin Works. This is currently the road's northern terminus, where traffic is directed onto the exit and entrance ramps. Construction on the next section further north is underway.

== Tolls ==
The Mon–Fayette Expressway is a toll road for most of its length, and utilizes all-electronic tolling using toll-by-plate (which uses automatic license plate recognition to take a photo of the vehicle's license plate and mail a bill to the vehicle owner) or E-ZPass. The highway has four mainline toll barriers located in Fairchance, Redstone, California, and Jefferson Hills. As of 2024, the Fairchance and California barriers charge $4.70 using toll-by-plate and $1.90 using E-ZPass for passenger vehicles while the Redstone and Jefferson Hills barriers charge $5.60 using toll-by-plate and $2.90 using E-ZPass for passenger vehicles. In addition there are also ramp toll plazas at the northbound exit and southbound entrances at exit 4, 15, and 18, the southbound exit and northbound entrance at exits 22 and 26, and the northbound exit and southbound entrance at exits 39, 44, and 48. The ramp tolls cost $3.40 using toll-by-plate and $1.50 using E-ZPass for passenger vehicles. In 2008, the PTC retrofitted all toll plazas to accept E-ZPass, and Express E-ZPass lanes are available at the newer Fairchance and Jefferson Hills plazas.

All-electronic tolling was planned to be implemented on the Mon–Fayette Expressway, along with the remainder of the Pennsylvania Turnpike system, in the later part of 2021. However, in March 2020 the switch was made early as a result of the COVID-19 pandemic.

When West Virginia began planning and building their section of the road, legislators debated whether their section would be a toll road or a toll-free road. When tolls were first proposed, West Virginia had planned to work with the Pennsylvania Turnpike Commission to collect tolls at the existing Pennsylvania mainline plaza, but this plan was not accepted by the West Virginia Legislature. Instead, West Virginia planned to construct a toll plaza north of Goodwin Hill Road. West Virginia officials also contemplated whether to use all-electronic tolling or a more traditional tolling scheme. In the end, tolling plans were scrapped by West Virginia's legislature. Rejection resulted from concerns related to camera enforcement, billing, and operational costs. However, West Virginia reserves the right to levy tolls in the future if these issues are settled and the need arises.

== History ==
=== Early history ===
The Mon–Fayette Expressway was originally proposed in the 1950s as a way to link the coke- and steel-producing towns situated in the Monongahela River Valley, thus providing a supplement to existing rail and river passages. Running along the existing PA Route 48, the highway was initially referred to as “New 48” and right-of-way clearance began in the early 1970s. PennDOT initiated construction in 1973, and the first segment opened in 1977. This segment consisted of a partial cloverleaf interchange at U.S. Route 40 and a 2-mile (3.2 km) stretch of four-lane highway that went south from the new interchange toward Fredericktown, where it ended by turning into the two-lane PA Route 88. Despite severe financial constraints, PennDOT built the remainder of the ramps at the U.S. 40 cloverleaf along with a separate 2-mile (3.2 km) stretch of highway from near California to Elco in the late 70s, and then the 2-mile stretch that linked the sections, completing a segment totaling 6 miles from Brownsville to Elco by the end of the decade.

Limited funding caused the project to be placed on hiatus in the early 1980s. During this time, the coke and steel industry that originally inspired the route experienced an economic downturn and near collapse. Rather than cancel the project, local leaders touted it as a means of stimulating the distressed economy; providing a link from the City of Pittsburgh to West Virginia along which manufacturing facilities and other industry could be located. The project was redesignated as the Mon–Fayette Expressway, a portmanteau of Monongahela River Valley and Fayette County, two of the areas the new road would connect. The project was designed to be completed in phases with the most controversial segment, PA 51 to Pittsburgh, scheduled to be completed last.

=== Transfer to the Turnpike Commission ===
Pennsylvania Route 43 Toll
- Location: California – Fallowfield Township
- Length: 5.6 mi (9.0 km)
- Existed: 1990–2000

In 1985, the Mon–Fayette Expressway project was transferred to the Pennsylvania Turnpike Commission (PTC) under Act 61 legislation. While PennDOT assessed preliminary engineering and right-of-way options in the 1970s and early 1980s, the PTC accelerated design work and began unveiling detailed plans in earnest by the late 1980s. Funding appropriated through the PTC allowed construction to resume in 1988, and on October 12, 1990, the short stretch from Elco to Interstate 70 was completed including the California Toll Plaza, thus finishing the link and connecting U.S. Route 40 to Interstate 70. Initially, the PTC did not have adequate funding to construct further new sections, but Representative Austin Murphy secured congressional funds that directed PennDOT to build a 4-mile (6.4 km) stretch of the expressway south of Uniontown. Aside from being part of a larger project, the new segment was designed to provide high speed access between the Uniontown bypass, Fairchance, and a new business park. This section, dubbed the Chadville Demonstration Project, opened in November 1992.

The section of the highway from US 40 to I-70 was signed PA 43 Toll until 2000, and in 2001, it was officially named the James J. Manderino Expressway in honor of James J. Manderino, a Pennsylvania State Representative who pushed for the construction of the highway.

=== Mason-Dixon Link ===
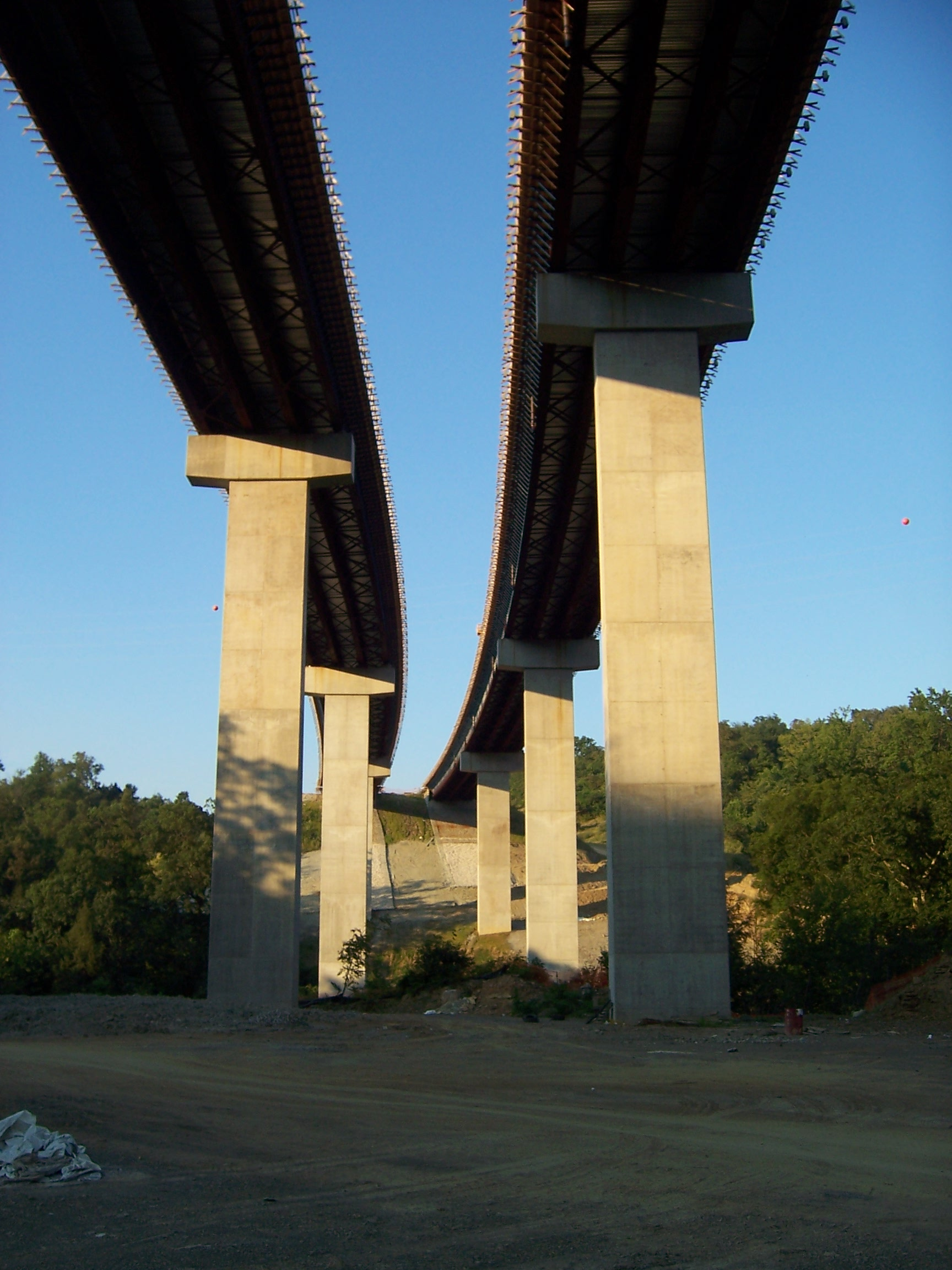
Ground level view under Morgan Run Bridge looking northbound

In the early 1990s, the Pennsylvania General Assembly dedicated a portion of state fuel excise tax revenue to the PTC. This new revenue stream initially provided the funding to complete an 8-mile (13 km) section from the southern terminus of the Chadville Demonstration Project to the West Virginia state line as well as a 17-mile (27 km) section from the Interstate 70 interchange to Pennsylvania Route 51 in Jefferson Hills. On March 1, 2000, most of the section between the Chadville Demonstration Project and the West Virginia state line opened to traffic.

=== J. Barry Stout Expressway ===
Officially named in 2001 for Barry Stout, the Pennsylvania State Senator who pushed to expand the state's highway system, the J. Barry Stout Expressway segment connects Interstate 70 with Route 51. Construction began in 1995, and the entire segment from Interstate 70 to Route 51 was open by April 12, 2002. The Joe Montana Bridge, named after the Pro Football Hall of Fame quarterback who grew up in the immediate area in nearby Monongahela, Pennsylvania, is located along the route.

=== Uniontown-to-Brownsville ===
In 2006, construction began on a 17-mile (27 km) stretch connecting the oldest section of the expressway near Fredericktown to the northern terminus of the Chadville Demonstration Project. Known locally as the "Uniontown-to-Brownsville Project," limited funding necessitated a two-phased approach to completion. The first phase involved construction of an 8-mile (13 km) section of expressway running parallel to a hazardous stretch of U.S. Route 40 between Brownsville and Uniontown. Phase 1 opened on October 23, 2008. The second phase consisted of a 9-mile (14 km) section that connects first phase of this project to the oldest portion of the expressway near Fredericktown, as well as the Mon–Fayette Expressway Bridge crossing the Monongahela River. Additionally, the second phase includes a directional T interchange at U.S. Route 119 in Uniontown. On December 13, 2010, the U.S. 119 interchange opened to traffic, and the remainder of Phase 2 opened with a soft launch on July 16, 2012. A formal ribbon-cutting ceremony was held on August 2, 2012. Completion of Phase 2 brought an uninterrupted 58-mile (93 km) stretch of highway between I-68 and Pennsylvania Route 51 in Jefferson Hills, Pennsylvania.

=== West Virginia Route 43 ===
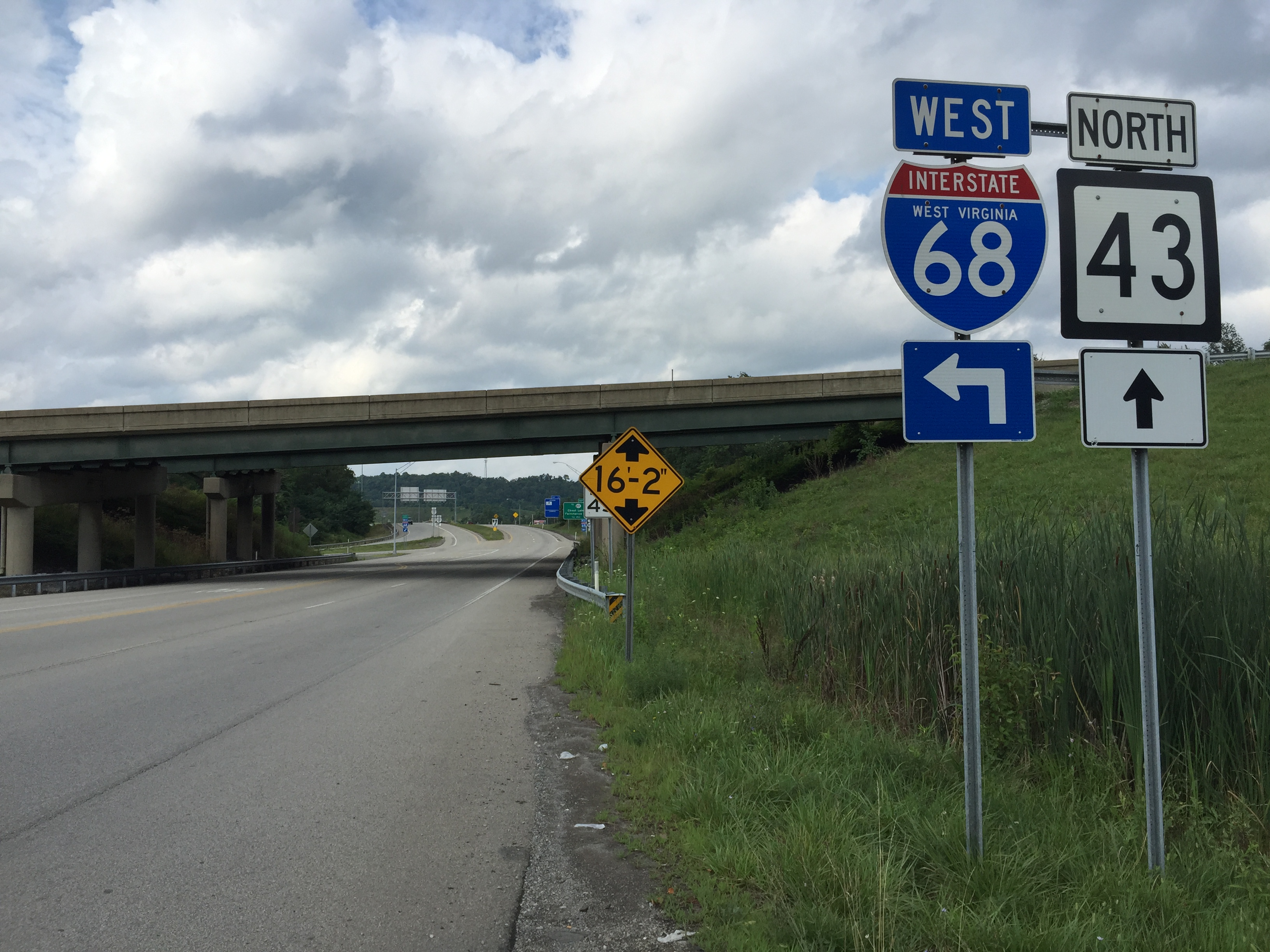
View north at the south end of WV 43 at I-68 in Cheat Lake

In West Virginia, construction commenced in 2000 but progressed slowly due to limited funding. By the end of 2003, only the Rubles Run Bridge and two pieces of highway totaling little more than 2.5 miles (4.0 km) were completed. Over the next few years, construction inched ahead. By 2009, the Morgan Run Bridge was finished, and local roads near Cheat Lake were re-built to accommodate the expressway. The final contracts to build the Cheat Lake and Interstate 68 interchanges were respectively awarded in December 2008 and July 2009, partly as a result of an ARRA fund infusion. On July 11, 2011, officials in West Virginia opened their 4-mile (6.4 km) section of the Mon–Fayette Expressway. Likewise, the PTC opened the southernmost 1.7 miles (2.7 km) in Pennsylvania, which sat unused for over a decade. Noteworthy features on the West Virginia section include two high-level bridges, along with the I-68 interchange, which is a hybrid design that utilizes both high-speed ramps and at-grade intersections. A second phase for this interchange is planned, but that project will not be undertaken until traffic volumes merit. If the second phase is built, the I-68 interchange will be upgraded to a directional T.

== Future ==
The final segment of highway to be built is the 13.7 miles (22.0 km) of highway in Allegheny County between PA 51 and I-376. Construction is proceeding from south to north, with the southernmost section finished and opened to traffic on November 20, 2026. Sections further north are currently under construction, and further sections are planned and waiting for funding.

The process to build this final section was the most lengthy and controversial due to it being in the most densely populated area of the entire route. After a review of several alternative alignments designated by colors (green, yellow, orange, and blue), a series of public meetings hosted by the Pennsylvania Turnpike Commission sought feedback from residents likely affected by the expressway's construction. The preferred route was identified as running parallel to PA 837 through the communities of Clairton and Duquesne, crossing over the Monongahela River near Kennywood Park, and then continuing along the northern side of the river through Braddock, Rankin, and Glen Hazel, finally connecting to I-376 at Oakland. An eastern spur was planned to branch off just north of the river crossing and continue north through Turtle Creek and Monroeville to I-376 in Wilkins Township. The addition of this spur would have allowed for an alternative to I-376 that would have bypassed the often congested Squirrel Hill Tunnel. The western spur would have continued the PA Turnpike 43 routing while the eastern spur would have continued the PA Turnpike 576 routing from the routes' planned junction approximately 1.7 miles (2.7 km) south of Finleyville-Elrama Road. Kennywood acquired nearly 50 acres (20 ha) of property for a potential expansion of the park on the condition that the leg to Monroeville is built.

After environmental clearances were obtained and right-of-way acquisition had begun, the project was placed on hold due to lack of funding, of which an estimated $3.6 billion was needed at the time. A public-private partnership was explored but nothing feasible resulted. In July 2013, the Allegheny County portion of the expressway was again the subject of news articles indicating that a change in approach may be taken. This revised approach would allow for completion of the expressway to Monroeville. The spur to Pittsburgh would not be constructed but rather the East Busway would be extended to Monroeville to allow for park and ride into downtown Pittsburgh. Another option under consideration was to open the Busway to high-occupancy vehicle (HOV) traffic.

In May 2013, a raise in the oil tax cap in Pennsylvania was proposed in the Pennsylvania General Assembly to fund additional transportation projects, including completing the Mon–Fayette Expressway and the Southern Beltway, as part of a larger transportation bill to help fund projects in the state. Pennsylvania Governor Tom Corbett signed a modified version of the bill into law, known as Act 89, on November 25, 2013, after much debate in the General Assembly that nearly killed the bill before it was passed. Act 89, which local politicians acknowledged that without passage would have killed the remaining segments of the Mon–Fayette Expressway, was expected to provide funding to complete the Southern Beltway all the way to the Mon–Fayette Expressway and provide a little less than half of the $2.2 billion (as of December 2013) needed to complete the Mon–Fayette Expressway, as well as the option for P3 funding. It was also acknowledged that like the Uniontown-to-Brownsville Project, the final leg may be built in multiple phases in order to preserve funding for other projects in the state. The second leg of the Southern Beltway, which proceeded in construction as had already been announced, was the first portion of the two highways built with the new funding available, and opened to I-79 on October 15, 2021.

In December 2014, it was reported that the Mon–Fayette Expressway and the Southern Beltway might get additional funding through foreign investors who obtain an EB-5 visa in exchange for investing at least $500,000 for public projects. The Pennsylvania Turnpike Commission would have used the EB-5 funding for the Pennsylvania Turnpike/Interstate 95 Interchange Project first before determining if it would use such funding for other projects, but ultimately this path was not taken.

On June 18, 2015, the PTC announced that the segment for the Mon–Fayette Expressway from Jefferson Hills to Monroeville would receive some Act 89 funding and would return to the design phase. The other leg of the Mon–Fayette Expressway into Pittsburgh was officially canceled outright at this time, citing cost and local opposition. All public plans and announcements indicate that what was the eastern spur, now the only route of the road, will be designated PA Turnpike 43 rather than PA Turnpike 576.

In March 2018, the PTC released its plans for the expressway from PA 51 in Jefferson Hills to PA 837 in Duquesne. This section began construction in 2024 and is proceeding in sections from south to north. Construction on the section of the expressway between PA 837 in Duquesne and I-376 in Monroeville is expected to follow, but is currently on hiatus due to funding shortfalls resulting from the COVID-19 pandemic and other issues.

In May 2019 a proposal was made for an expressway to run from the Mon–Fayette Expressway to PA 885 near the Glenwood Bridge. In March 2021, a PTC engineer said that preliminary work on the Mon–Fayette Expressway from Jefferson Hills to PA 837 would begin after the projected completion of the Southern Beltway later that year. The PTC was in the process of acquiring 256 land lots in the Mon–Fayette Expressway's right-of-way, including condemning some land in West Mifflin, Pennsylvania, that belonged to Kennywood amusement park. In June 2021, PTC officials told Pennsylvania state legislators that construction on the section to Duquesne could begin as early as 2022, but the project was not announced until January 2023. The PTC held a formal groundbreaking ceremony on May 22, 2023. The first segment, a 3.1 mile extension from PA 51 to Camp Hollow Road in West Mifflin, opened on November 20, 2026. The next section, to Pittsburgh-McKeesport Boulevard, is under construction and scheduled to open in 2027. Work on the segment to Duquesne is projected to continue through 2029.

== Exit list ==
State	County	Location	mi	km	Exit	Destinations	Notes
West Virginia	Monongalia	Cheat Lake	0.0	0.0	—	I-68 to I-79 – Cumberland, MD, Morgantown	Southern terminus of WV 43; exit 10 on I-68
West Virginia	Monongalia	Cheat Lake	0.7	1.1	1	To CR 857 (Fairchance Road) – Cheat Lake	Access via Bowers Lane
West Virginia–Pennsylvania state line			4.2	6.8	WV 43 becomes PA Turnpike 43		
Pennsylvania	Fayette	Springhill Township	5.9	9.5	2	To US 119 – Point Marion	Access via Gans Road; last northbound exit before toll
Pennsylvania	Fayette	Georges Township	8.0	12.9	4	To PA 857 – Smithfield, Haydentown, Rubles Mill	Master Sgt. Arthur L. Lilley Memorial Interchange; tolled northbound exit and southbound entrance; access via Rubles Mill Road; Smithfield signed northbound, Rubles Mill signed southbound
Pennsylvania	Fayette	Georges Township	9.9	15.9	Fairchance Toll Plaza (E-ZPass or toll-by-plate)		
Pennsylvania	Fayette	Georges Township	12.2	19.6	8	To US 119 / PA 857 – Smithfield, Fairchance	Cpl. Alfred L. Wilson Interchange; access via Big Six Road; last southbound exit before toll
Pennsylvania	Fayette	Georges Township	12.2	19.6	PA Turnpike 43 becomes PA 43		
Pennsylvania	Fayette	Georges Township	15.9	25.6		US 119 south (Morgantown Road) / PA 857 south	43 designation officially ends as signs direct northbound motorists to follow US 119 for Toll 43 traffic.
Pennsylvania	Fayette	South Union Township	16.3	26.2		US 40 east – Hopwood	No southbound entrance; southern end of US 40 concurrency
Pennsylvania	Fayette	South Union Township	17.1	27.5		Walnut Hill Road	
Pennsylvania	Fayette	South Union Township	18.5	29.8		PA 21 (McClellandtown Road)	
Pennsylvania	Fayette	South Union–North Union township line	19.2	30.9		US 40 west / US 40 Bus. east (Main Street)	Northern end of US 40 concurrency
Pennsylvania	Fayette	North Union Township	20.1	32.3		US 119 north / PA 51 (Pittsburgh Street) – Connellsville, New Stanton	Northern end of US 119 concurrency; no southbound access to PA 51; last northbound exit before toll
Pennsylvania	Fayette	North Union Township	20.1	32.3	PA Turnpike 43 designation begins again northbound, ends southbound.		
Pennsylvania	Fayette	North Union Township	21.1	34.0	15	To US 40 / PA 51 / Northgate Highway	Staff Sgt. John P. Wanto Vietnam Veteran Exit; tolled northbound exit and southbound entrance; access via Old Pittsburgh Road
Pennsylvania	Fayette	Menallen Township	24.7	39.8	18	To US 40 – New Salem, Waltersburg	Lance Corporal Russell W. Naugle Vietnam Veteran Exit; tolled northbound exit and southbound entrance; access via Pleasant View Smock Road
Pennsylvania	Fayette	Redstone Township	27.9	44.9	Redstone Toll Gantry (E-ZPass or toll-by-plate)		
Pennsylvania	Fayette	Redstone Township	28.7	46.2	22	US 40 – Brier Hill, Brownsville	PFC Joseph Frank Duda Memorial Interchange; tolled southbound exit and northbound entrance
Pennsylvania	Fayette	Luzerne Township	32.7	52.6	26	Brownsville, Republic	Ronald F. DeSalvo Memorial Interchange; tolled southbound exit and northbound entrance; access via Telegraph Road
Pennsylvania	Monongahela River				PFC Ronald C. "Smokey" Bakewell Memorial Bridge (Mon–Fayette Expressway Bridge)		
Pennsylvania	Washington	Centerville	34.7	55.8	28	PA 88 south – West Brownsville, Fredericktown	Marine Cpl. Thomas R. Matty Memorial Interchange; southern end of PA 88 concurrency; last southbound exit before toll
Pennsylvania	Washington	Centerville	36.7	59.1	30	US 40 / PA 88 north – Brownsville, Centerville	Signed as exits 30A (east) and 30B (west); northern end of PA 88 concurrency
Pennsylvania	Washington	California	38.1	61.3	32	California	Access to California University of Pennsylvania and California Technology Park
Pennsylvania	Washington	California	40.4	65.0	34	Elco	Last northbound exit before toll
Pennsylvania	Washington	California	41.5	66.8	California Toll Plaza (E-ZPass or toll-by-plate)		
Pennsylvania	Washington	Fallowfield Township	41.8	67.3	36	I-70 – New Stanton, Washington, PA	Col. Walter J. Marm Jr. Interchange; signed as exits 36A (east) and 36B (west)
Pennsylvania	Washington	Fallowfield Township	45.1	72.6	39	Charleroi, Donora	Col. Mitchell Paige Interchange; tolled northbound exit and southbound entrance
Pennsylvania	Washington	Carroll Township	49.8	80.1	44	PA 136 – Eighty Four, Monongahela	SSgt. Karl Gorman Taylor Sr. Interchange; tolled northbound exit and southbound entrance
Pennsylvania	Washington	Union Township	54.3	87.4	48	Finleyville, West Elizabeth	Sgt. Archibald Mathies Interchange; tolled northbound exit and southbound entrance
Pennsylvania	Allegheny	Jefferson Hills	57.7	92.9	Jefferson Hills Toll Gantry (E-ZPass or toll-by-plate)		
Pennsylvania	Allegheny	Jefferson Hills	59.4	95.6	54	PA 51 – Jefferson Hills, Elizabeth	Cpt. Reginald Desiderio Interchange; access via Jefferson Boulevard
Pennsylvania	Allegheny	West Mifflin	63.5	102.2	57	Camp Hollow Road, West Mifflin, Clairton	
Pennsylvania	Allegheny	Dravosburg	64.5	103.8	58	Pittsburgh McKeesport Boulevard	Proposed northbound exit and southbound entrance
Pennsylvania	Allegheny	West Mifflin	66.8	107.5	61	To PA 837 – Duquesne	Planned temporary northern terminus
Pennsylvania	Monongahela River		68.1	109.6	Monongahela River Bridge		
Pennsylvania	Allegheny	North Versailles Township	69.4	111.7	64	To US 30 / E. Pittsburgh McKeesport Blvd	
Pennsylvania	Allegheny	Monroeville	72.9	117.3	68A	To US 22 Bus. – Monroeville	Northbound exit and southbound entrance
Pennsylvania	Allegheny	Monroeville	73.2	117.8	68B-C	I-376 / US 22 to I-76 / Penna Turnpike – Pittsburgh, Murrysville	Future northern terminus of PA Turnpike 43; I-376 future exit 82
1.000 mi = 1.609 km; 1.000 km = 0.621 mi: Concurrency terminus; Electronic toll collection; Incomplete access; Route transition; Unopened

== Related roads ==
In the 1990s, the Mon–Fayette Expressway project was expanded to include another highway, the Southern Beltway. The Southern Beltway was planned to be a high-speed east–west link between the Mon–Fayette Expressway, Interstate 79, U.S. Route 22, Interstate 376, and Pittsburgh International Airport, and has been designated as Pennsylvania Route 576. A 6-mile (9.7 km) section of the beltway between Pittsburgh International Airport/Interstate 376 and U.S. Route 22 opened to traffic in 2006. A 13-mile (21 km) section between U.S. 22 and I-79 opened in 2021, and the third section between I-79 and the Mon–Fayette Expressway just south of Exit 48 and Finleyville, Pennsylvania is planned but not yet funded for construction.

In order to provide access to certain interchanges within the Uniontown-to-Brownsville project, the PTC had to build several toll-free connectors, the most notable of which extended a four-lane section of U.S. Route 40 near Brownsville, eliminating a forty-year-old freeway stub in the process. Near Uniontown, the PTC constructed a four-lane road, named Northgate Highway, between U.S. Route 40 and Pennsylvania Route 51. In addition, a new connector was added to join Telegraph Road and Bull Run Road in Luzerne Township, potentially opening many acres of land to future development. The aforementioned access roads were necessary to provide access to exits 22, 15, and 26 respectively, but these routes were also designed to improve local connections and accommodate any future economic development in the interchanges' immediate vicinity.
