= Mingo Creek Viaduct =

- Coordinates: 40.2079°N 79.9847°W
- Carries: 4 lanes of PA Turnpike 43
- Crosses: Mingo Creek
- Locale: Union Township, Carroll Township, and Nottingham Township
- Official name: Joe Montana Bridges

Characteristics
- Design: Girder bridge
- Total length: 2,400 feet (730 m)
- Clearance below: 250 feet (76 m)

History
- Opened: April 2002

The Mingo Creek Viaduct, officially called the Joe Montana Bridges, are a pair of twin girder bridges that carry Pennsylvania Route 43 over the Mingo Creek, Pennsylvania Route 88, and the Wheeling and Lake Erie Railway between Union Township and Carroll Township, both of Washington County, Pennsylvania.

The bridges were completed in April 2002 with spans of 2,400 feet (730 m) and heights of 250 feet (76 m), which makes them the highest bridges in the Pennsylvania Turnpike system. The Emlenton Bridge at 270 feet (82 m) is the only higher bridge in Pennsylvania.

The bridges are named after Pro Football Hall of Fame NFL quarterback Joe Montana, who played for nearby Ringgold High School.

== See also ==
- List of bridges in the United States by height
