= Mon–Fayette Expressway Bridge =

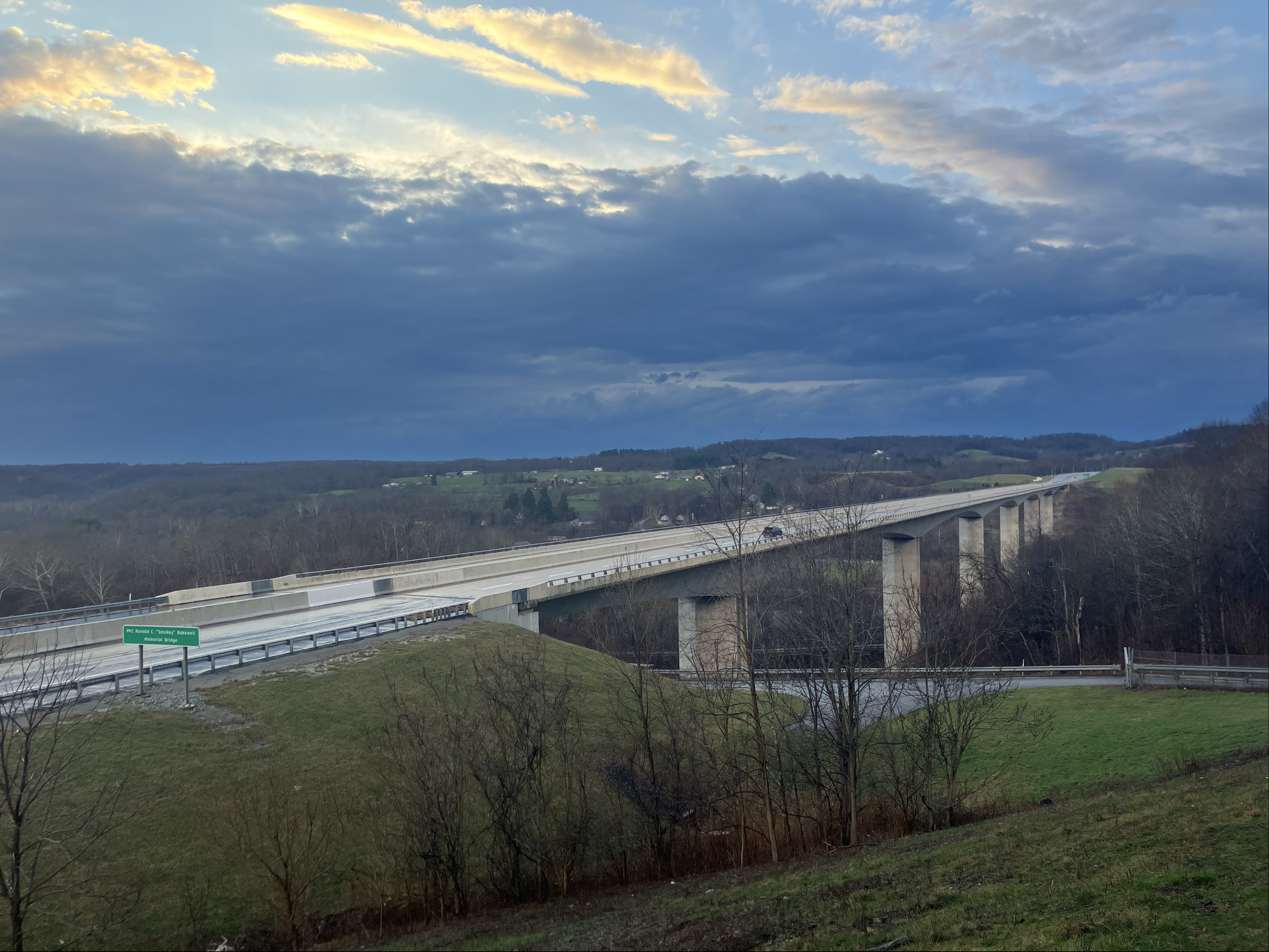
- Coordinates: 40.00438°N 79.93238°W
- Carries: 4 lanes of PA Turnpike 43
- Crosses: Monongahela River
- Locale: Luzerne Township and Centerville
- Official name: PFC Ronald C. "Smokey" Bakewell Bridge

Characteristics
- Design: Girder bridge
- Total length: 3,022 feet (921 m)
- Clearance below: 200 feet (61 m)

History
- Opened: July 6, 2013

Location
- Interactive map of Mon–Fayette Expressway Bridge

The Mon–Fayette Expressway Bridge, officially known as the PFC Ronald C. "Smokey" Bakewell Bridge, is a high-level, girder bridge that carries vehicular traffic across the Monongahela River between Luzerne Township in Fayette County, Pennsylvania and Centerville in Washington County, Pennsylvania.

== History and notable features ==
The bridge was opened on July 6, 2012, and completed the southern section of Pennsylvania Route 43, more commonly known as the Mon–Fayette Expressway. Motorists can now travel via freeway for fifty-eight miles (93 km) between Morgantown, West Virginia and the Pittsburgh suburb of Jefferson Hills, Pennsylvania. The cost of the bridge project was $96 million.

The total length of the bridge is 3,022 feet; 51,000 cubic yards of concrete were used to create the structure.

In 2013, the Pennsylvania Legislature voted to name the bridge for Private First Class Ronald C. "Smokey" Bakewell, a local serviceman who was killed during the Vietnam War. Bakewell lived within a half of a mile of where the bridge stands today. He was a member of Charlie Troop, First Battalion, Fifth Regiment, of the First Air Cavalry.

== See also ==
- List of crossings of the Monongahela River
