= Springhill Township, Fayette County, Pennsylvania =

Township in Pennsylvania, United States

Coordinates: 39°46′00″N 79°52′59″W

Springhill Township
- Township
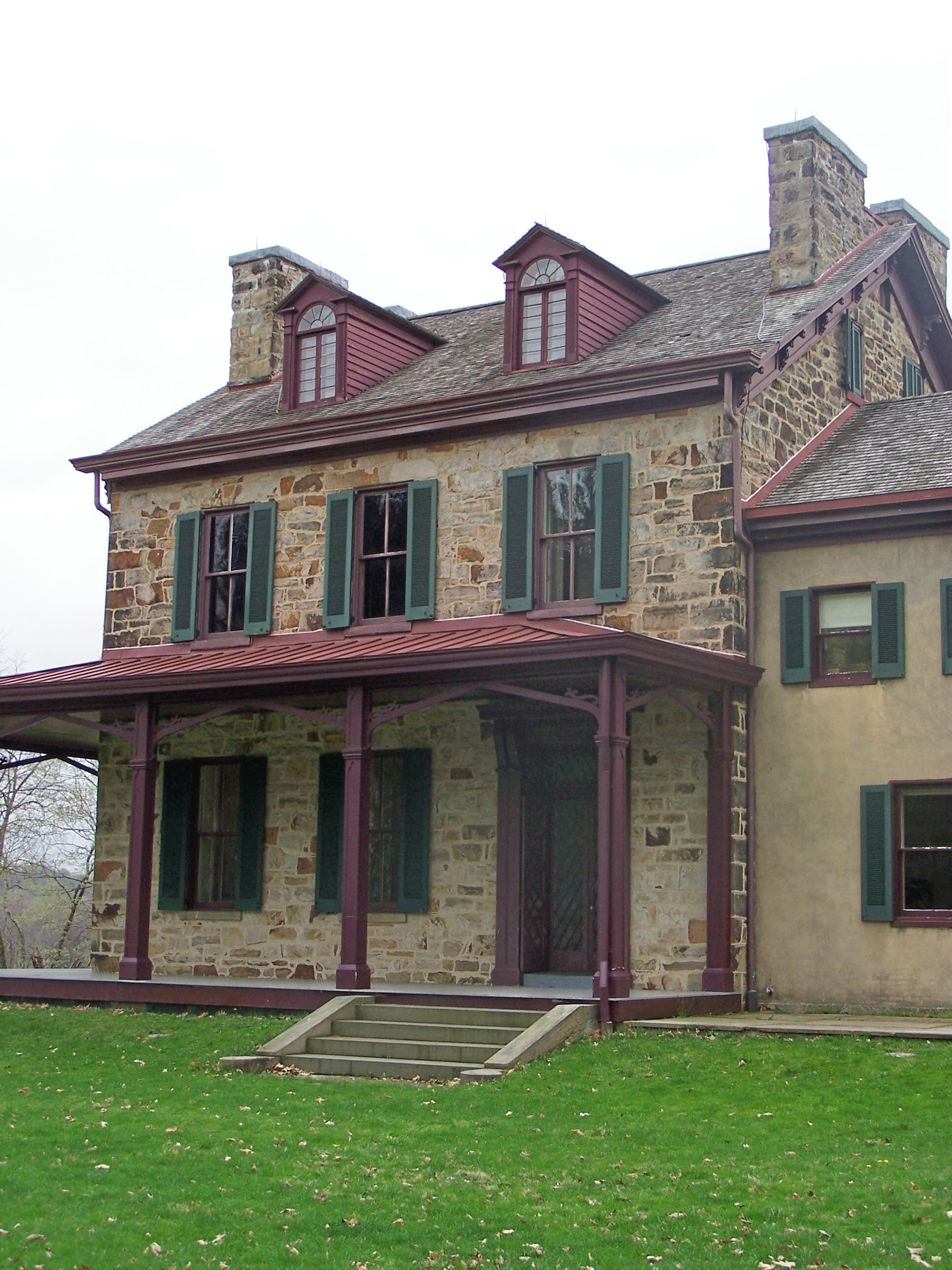
- Friendship Hill National Historic Site

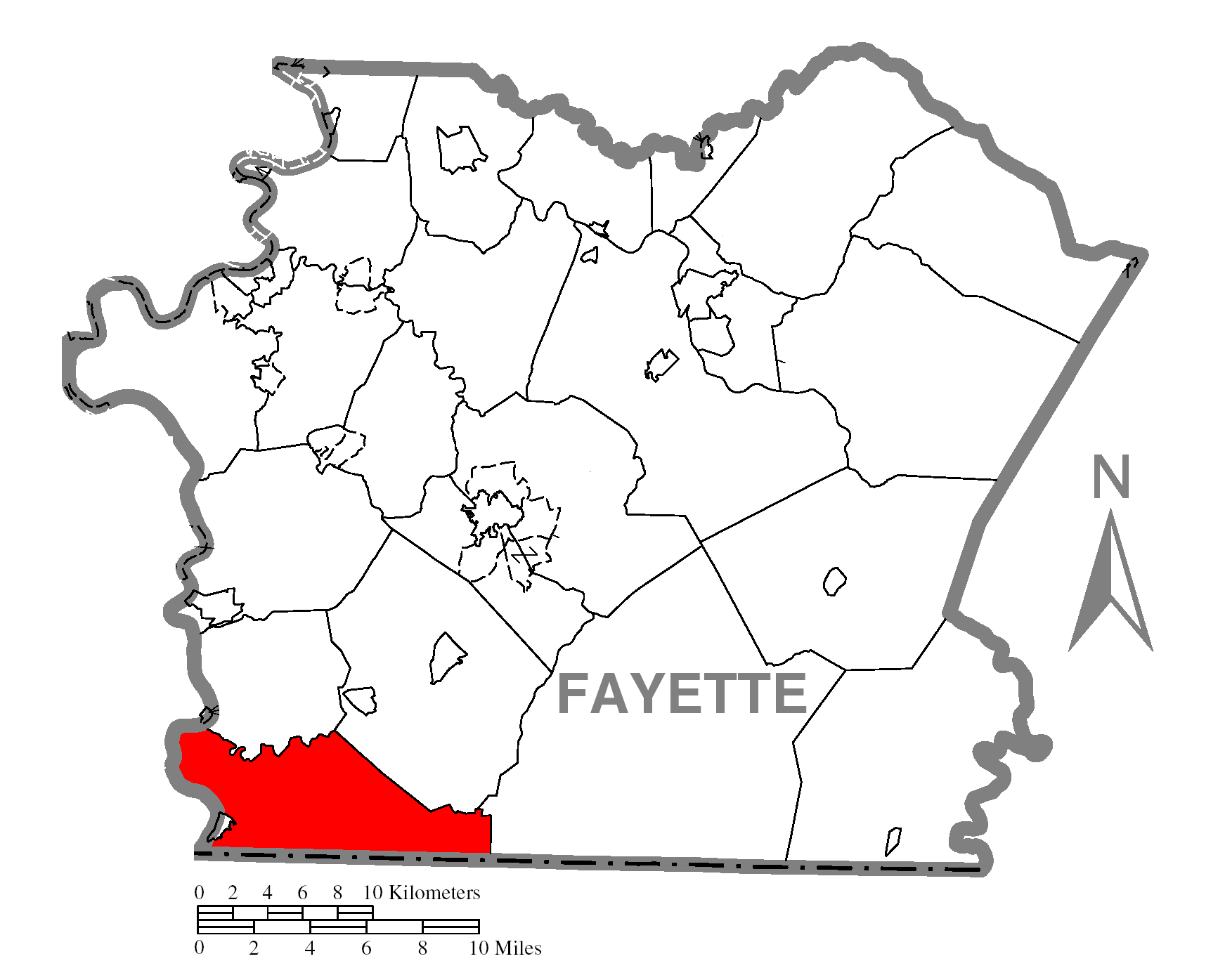
- Location of Springhill Township in Fayette County

- Location of Fayette County in Pennsylvania
- Country: United States
- State: Pennsylvania
- County: Fayette

Area
  - Total: 34.29 sq mi (88.81 km^{2})
  - Land: 33.78 sq mi (87.49 km^{2})
  - Water: 0.51 sq mi (1.32 km^{2})

Population (2020)
  - Total: 2,726 ▼
  - Estimate (2022): 2,671
  - Density: 83.3/sq mi (32.16/km^{2})
- Time zone: UTC-4 (EST)
  - Summer (DST): UTC-5 (EDT)
- Area code: 724
- FIPS code: 42-051-73240
- Website: https://www.springhilltownshippa.org/

Springhill Township is a township in Fayette County, Pennsylvania, United States. The population was 2,726 at the 2020 census. The Albert Gallatin Area School District serves the region.

Unincorporated communities in the township include Friendship Heights, White House, McKinley Hill, Sprucetown, Nilan, and Gans.

== History ==
"The name "Springhill" was given by Col. George Wilson, the earliest settler on Georges Creek (at its mouth, in what is now Nicholson township), who had come here from Springhill, in Augusta [County], Va., and had given that name to the new region in which he settled. That was while all the Monongahela country was included in Cumberland County; and the old Springhill township of that county embraced an immense territory, covering all the southern part of what is now Fayette, all of Greene, and the south part of the present county of Washington."

Spring Hill Township was formed in 1771 when the area was part of Bedford County. It contained all of what is now Greene County, part of Washington County and nearly all of Fayette County.

When Westmoreland County was formed from Bedford County in 1773 Springhill Township was one of its eight original townships.

Springhill Township was one of the original townships of Fayette County, having been erected by the Court of Quarter Sessions of the county at the first term, held in December 1783.

Albert Gallatin's Friendship Hill home is located in the township and is maintained as the Friendship Hill National Historic Site.

== Geography ==
Springhill Township occupies the southwestern corner of Fayette County. It is bordered to the south by the state of West Virginia and to the west, across the Monongahela River, by Greene County. The borough of Point Marion, a separate municipality, is located along the western edge of the township at the confluence of the Monongahela and the Cheat River. Georges Creek, a tributary of the Monongahela, forms the northern boundary of the township.

According to the United States Census Bureau, the township has a total area of 34.3 square miles (88.8 km^{2}), of which 33.8 square miles (87.5 km^{2}) is land and 0.50 square miles (1.3 km^{2}), or 1.49%, is water. Chestnut Ridge crosses the southeast corner of the township, with a high point of 2,545 feet (776 m) above sea level.

U.S. Route 119 crosses the township, leading northeast to Uniontown, the county seat, and southwest to Morgantown, West Virginia. The Mon–Fayette Expressway crosses the eastern part of the township, also connecting Uniontown and Morgantown. Access within the township is from Exit 2 (Gans Road).

== Demographics ==
Historical population
| Census | Pop. | Note | %± |
|---|---|---|---|
| 2010 | 2,907 | | — |
| 2020 | 2,726 | | −6.2% |
| 2022 (est.) | 2,671 | | −2.0% |
U.S. Decennial Census

As of the 2000 census, there were 2,974 people, 1,157 households, and 877 families residing in the township. The population density was 88.8 inhabitants per square mile (34.3/km^{2}). There were 1,270 housing units at an average density of 37.9 per square mile (14.6/km^{2}). The racial makeup of the township was 97.92% White, 0.94% African American, 0.27% Native American, 0.10% Asian, 0.07% Pacific Islander, 0.10% from other races, and 0.61% from two or more races. Hispanic or Latino of any race were 0.54% of the population.

There were 1,157 households, out of which 32.2% had children under the age of 18 living with them, 57.9% were married couples living together, 13.0% had a female householder with no husband present, and 24.2% were non-families. 21.9% of all households were made up of individuals, and 10.2% had someone living alone who was 65 years of age or older. The average household size was 2.57 and the average family size was 2.96.

In the township the population was spread out, with 24.7% under the age of 18, 8.8% from 18 to 24, 27.7% from 25 to 44, 25.1% from 45 to 64, and 13.6% who were 65 years of age or older. The median age was 37 years. For every 100 females there were 93.0 males. For every 100 females age 18 and over, there were 91.9 males.

The median income for a household in the township was $24,167, and the median income for a family was $29,182. Males had a median income of $28,317 versus $18,221 for females. The per capita income for the township was $12,360. About 22.3% of families and 28.0% of the population were below the poverty line, including 42.0% of those under age 18 and 5.8% of those age 65 or over.
