= Oliphant Furnace, Pennsylvania =

Unincorporated community in Pennsylvania, US

- Unincorporated community
- Location within Pennsylvania Location within the United States
- Coordinates: 39°50′32″N 79°43′33″W
- Country: United States
- State: Pennsylvania
- County: Fayette
- Township: Georges
- Elevation: 1,201 ft (366 m)
- Time zone: UTC-5 (Eastern (EST))
  - Summer (DST): UTC-4 (EDT)
- GNIS feature ID: 1182970

Oliphant Furnace is an unincorporated community and coal town in Fayette County, Pennsylvania, United States. The town began as a mining community which grew up around the cokeworks, which bore the name "Oliphant Furnace" in the 1870s. Other towns with "Furnace" in the name can be found in the region.

Several original saltbox houses which were built by the mining companies can still be found in town, as well as the ruins of the cokeworks just outside town.
