= Gans, Pennsylvania =

Unincorporated community in Pennsylvania, US

- Unincorporated community
- Location within Pennsylvania Location within the United States
- Coordinates: 39°44′34″N 79°49′27″W
- Country: United States
- State: Pennsylvania
- County: Fayette
- Township: Springhill
- Elevation: 988 ft (301 m)
- Time zone: UTC-5 (Eastern (EST))
  - Summer (DST): UTC-4 (EDT)
- ZIP code: 15439
- Area code: 724
- GNIS feature ID: 1175417

Gans is an unincorporated community in Fayette County, Pennsylvania, United States. Gans is 4 miles (6.4 km) east of Point Marion. Gans has a post office, with ZIP code 15439, located on Gans Road inside Burchinal's General Store.
