= Fairchance, Pennsylvania =

Borough in Pennsylvania, United States

- Borough
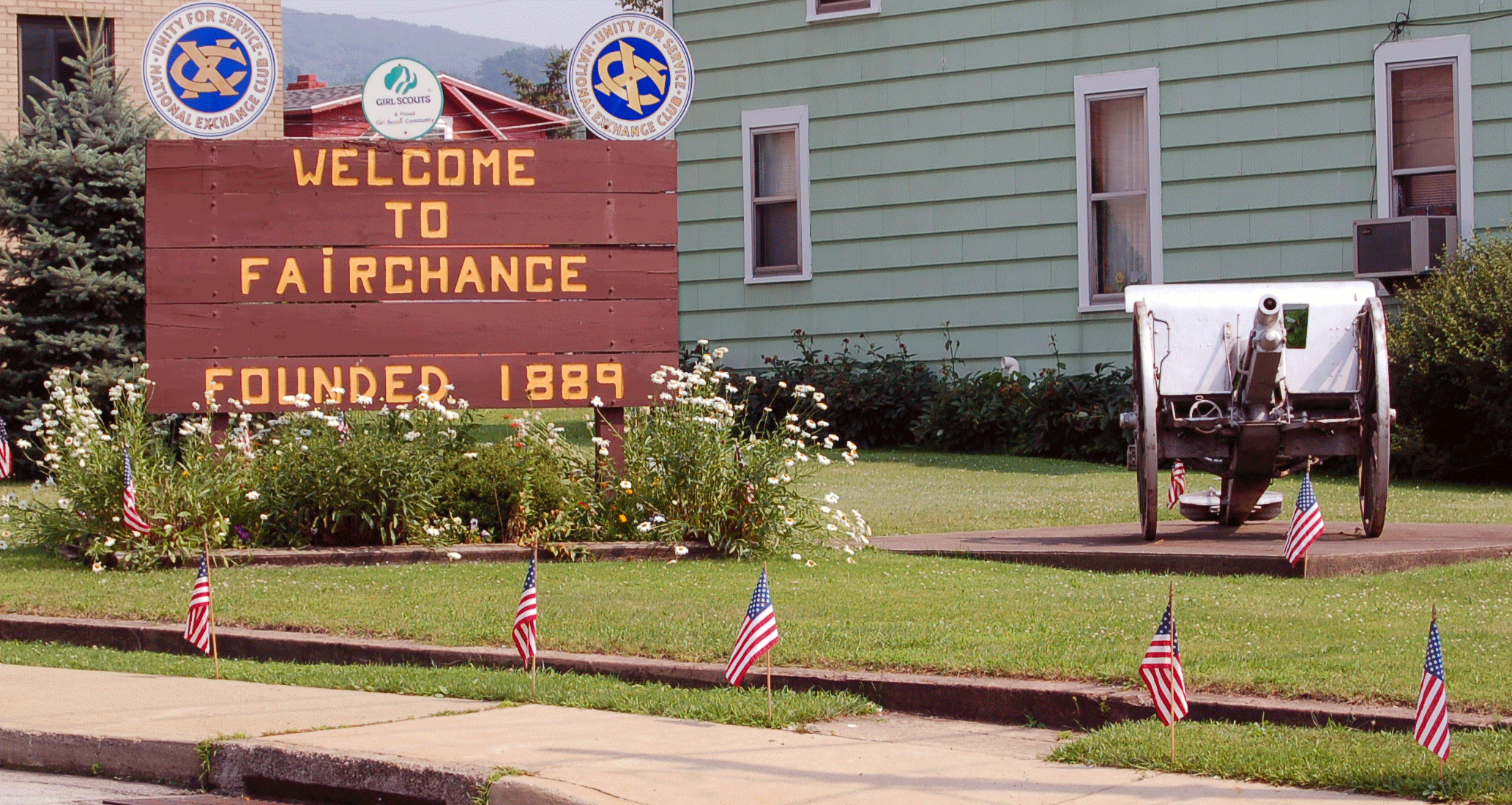

- Location of Fairchance in Fayette County, Pennsylvania.

- Location in Pennsylvania Fairchance (the United States)
- Coordinates: 39°49′26″N 79°45′17″W
- Country: United States
- State: Pennsylvania
- County: Fayette
- Established: 1889

Government
  - Mayor: Tom Tanner

Area
  - Total: 1.19 sq mi (3.07 km^{2})
  - Land: 1.19 sq mi (3.07 km^{2})
  - Water: 0 sq mi (0.00 km^{2})

Population (2020)
  - Total: 1,890
  - Density: 1,592.4/sq mi (614.84/km^{2})
- Time zone: UTC-4 (EST)
  - Summer (DST): UTC-5 (EDT)
- ZIP code: 15436
- Area codes: 724, 878
- FIPS code: 42-24536
- Website: https://www.fairchanceborough.com/

Fairchance is a borough in Fayette County, Pennsylvania, United States. The population was 1,889 at the 2020 census, a decline from the figure of 1,975 tabulated in 2010. It is served by the Albert Gallatin Area School District.

== Geography ==
Fairchance is located in south-central Fayette County at 39°49′26″N 79°45′17″W (39.823970, −79.754800). It sits at the western base of Chestnut Ridge, the westernmost major ridge of the Appalachian Mountains in this area.

Pennsylvania Route 43, the Mon–Fayette Expressway, passes just west of the borough limits, with access from Exit 8 (Big 6 Road). The toll highway leads north 7 miles (11 km) to Uniontown, the county seat, and southwest 19 miles (31 km) to Morgantown, West Virginia. Pennsylvania Route 857 passes through the center of Fairchance as Morgantown Street.

According to the United States Census Bureau, the borough has a total area of 1.20 square miles (3.11 km^{2}), all land.

== Demographics ==
Historical population
Census	Pop.	Note	%±
1890	1,092		—
1900	1,219		11.6%
1910	1,760		44.4%
1920	2,124		20.7%
1930	1,804		−15.1%
1940	1,855		2.8%
1950	2,091		12.7%
1960	2,120		1.4%
1970	1,906		−10.1%
1980	2,106		10.5%
1990	1,918		−8.9%
2000	2,174		13.3%
2010	1,975		−9.2%
2020	1,890		−4.3%
2021 (est.)	1,864	▼	−1.4%

As of the 2000 census, there were 2,174 people, 871 households, and 594 families residing in the borough. The population density was 1,797.1 inhabitants per square mile (693.9/km^{2}). There were 932 housing units at an average density of 770.4 per square mile (297.5/km^{2}). The racial makeup of the borough was 95.81% White, 2.76% African American, 0.09% Native American, 0.09% Asian, and 1.24% from two or more races. Hispanics or Latinos of any race were 0.51% of the population.

There were 871 households, out of which 29.3% had children under the age of 18 living with them, 50.7% were married couples living together, 13.0% had a female householder with no husband present, and 31.7% were non-families. 27.3% of all households were made up of individuals, and 14.4% had someone living alone who was 65 years of age or older. The average household size was 2.47, and the average family size was 3.00.

In the borough the population was spread out, with 23.8% under the age of 18, 8.8% from 18 to 24, 27.3% from 25 to 44, 22.7% from 45 to 64, and 17.4% who were 65 years of age or older. The median age was 38 years. For every 100 females, there were 87.6 males. For every 100 females age 18 and over, there were 82.1 males.

The median income for a household in the borough was $26,840, and the median income for a family was $33,611. Males had a median income of $27,625 versus $20,750 for females. The per capita income for the borough was $14,021. About 12.0% of families and 16.5% of the population were below the poverty line, including 19.1% of those under age 18 and none of those age 65 or over.

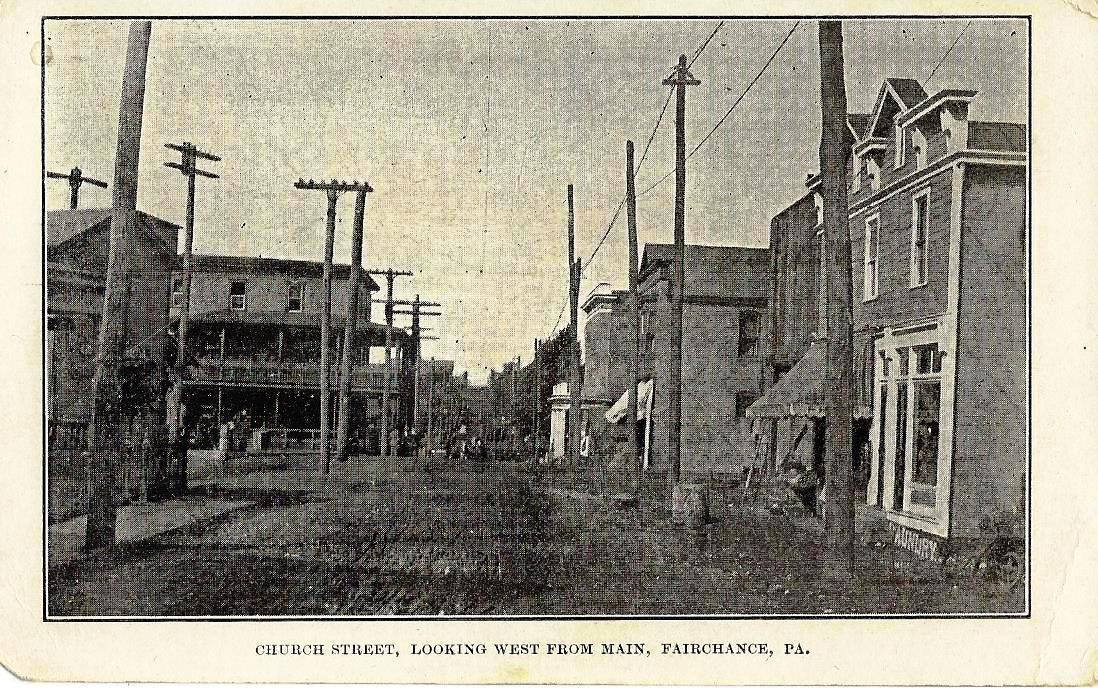
Looking west onto Church St. from Main St.

== Name ==
Many townspeople state that Fairchance got its name in the early days of transportation. The story goes that travelers from Morgantown, West Virginia, who made it to the borough by 4:00 P.M. had a "fair chance" of making it to Uniontown before sundown. Another explanation cited in the book Fairchance Through the Years, compiled by the Fairchance Centennial History Committee, is that Fidelio H. Oliphant, who operated iron furnaces in the area, went to a bank in Uniontown to borrow money with the assurance that he had a "fair chance" of paying it back.
