= Haydentown, Pennsylvania =

Haydentown
- Unincorporated community
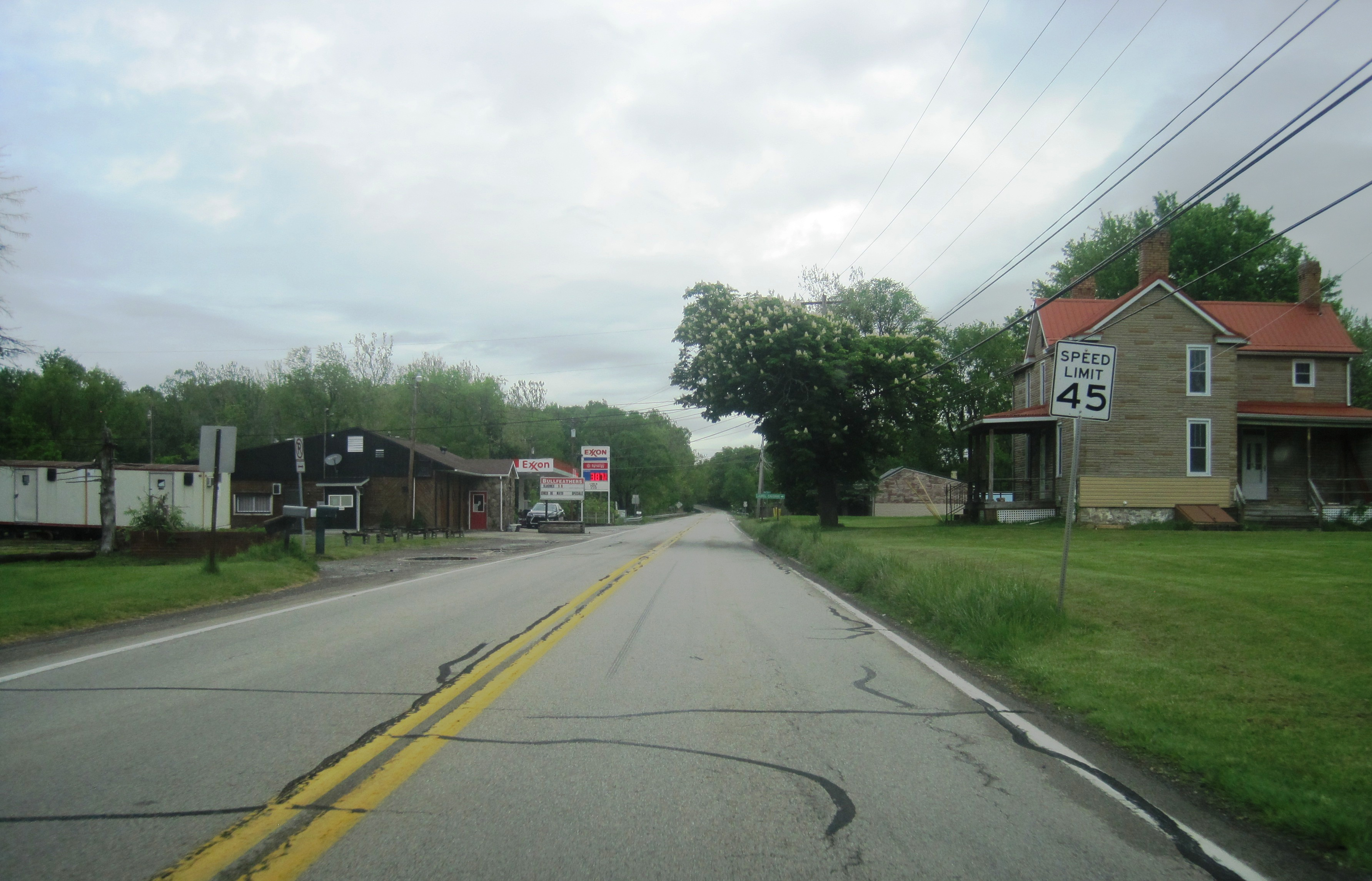
- Northbound PA 857 through Haydentown

- Location within Pennsylvania Location within the United States
- Coordinates: 39.794°N 79.766°W
- Country: United States
- State: Pennsylvania
- County: Fayette
- Borough: Smithfield
- Elevation: 1,125 ft (343 m)
- Time zone: UTC−5 (EST)
  - Summer (DST): UTC−4 (EDT)
- ZIP Code: 15478
- Area code: 724
- GNIS feature ID: 1176686

Haydentown is an unincorporated village which is located on Route 857 in Fayette County, Pennsylvania in the United States.

== History ==
John Hayden came to Fayette County, Pennsylvania in 1778, after serving for six months in the Revolutionary War. Being a blacksmith by trade, he soon discovered stone coal (hard coal) and the best of iron ore. There were a few Scotch settled just west of the trading post called Hardbargain. This settlement became known as Georgetown.

Sometime around this same time, several Germans organized the settlement of Berlin. Georgetown then became known as Haydenberg, and was patented by John Hayden in 1787. The town subsequently was renamed as Haydentown.

Roughly two years later, Hayden dug out what he believed to be limestone from a creek bed of a tributary of the Georges River in Georges Township. Unable to burn the limestone, he took a portion of it to the blacksmith shop, and discovered that it was high quality iron ore.

Hayden subsequently was appointed as a captain of a militia company that was raised in the three settlements of Berlin, Georgetown and Hardbargain to drive Indigenous people of the region north and west. For his actions, he was allotted 9,000 acres of land. Because all related land records were destroyed in the War of 1812, and because the United States Congress never passed legislation giving Hayden the right to dispose of his land, only a tract that he donated for the Hayden Cemetery was subsequently honored. That cemetery is now known as the White Rock Cemetery.

== Legacy ==
By 1910, more iron ore was produced in Haydentown than in the city of Pittsburgh.
