= New Geneva, Pennsylvania =

Unincorporated community in Pennsylvania, US

- Unincorporated community
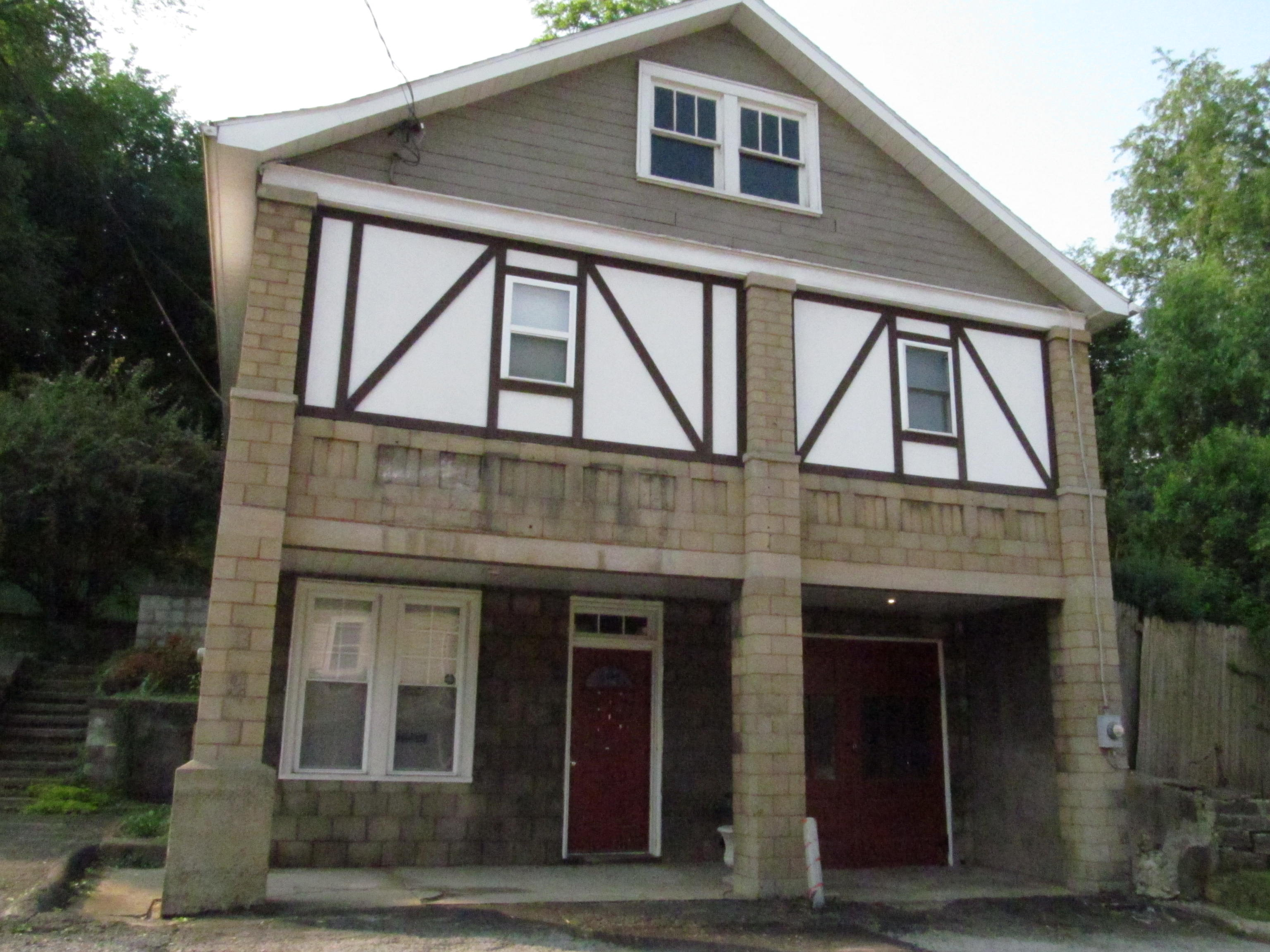
- House in New Geneva

- Location within Pennsylvania
- Coordinates: 39°47′18″N 79°54′33″W
- Country: United States
- State: Pennsylvania
- County: Fayette
- Elevation: 951 ft (290 m)
- Time zone: UTC-5 (Eastern (EST))
  - Summer (DST): UTC-4 (EDT)
- ZIP code: 15467
- Area codes: 724, 878
- GNIS feature ID: 1182323

New Geneva is an unincorporated community in Fayette County, Pennsylvania, United States. The community is located along Pennsylvania Route 166 and the Monongahela River, across from Greensboro. New Geneva has a post office, with ZIP code 15467.
