= Fayette County Career and Technical Institute =

Fayette County Career & Technical Institute

Location
- 175 Georges-Fairchance Road; Georges Township, Fayette County, Pennsylvania; 15401
- Coordinates: 39.8612°N 79.7414°W

Information
- Type: Vocational-Technical
- Opened: 1967
- Director: Dr. Cynthia Shaw
- Faculty: 19
- Grades: 10-12
- Website: fayettecti.org

The Fayette County Career and Technical Institute, located near Uniontown, Pennsylvania is a local vocational technical school for students enrolled in one of four school districts in the county.

== Sending school districts and high schools ==
The following school districts and their respective high schools attend FCCTI:

School district	High School
Albert Gallatin Area	Albert Gallatin High School
Brownsville Area	Brownsville Area High School
Laurel Highlands	Laurel Highlands High School
Uniontown Area	Uniontown Area High School

== Program areas ==
Currently, there are 18 program areas at FCCTI. They Include

- Advanced Manufacturing Adademy
- Agriculture
- Auto Body
- Auto Mechanics
- Barbershop
- Building Construction
- Cosmeotology
- Culinary Arts
- Diesel Mechanics
- Electrical Construction
- Graphic Arts
- Health Occupations
- Heating, Ventilation and Air Conditioning (HVAC)
- Information Technology
- Machine Production Technology
- Masonry
- Welding

== Organizations ==
The following organizations are available to the high school students:

- Future Farmers of America (FFA)
- Health Occupations Students of America (HOSA)
- National Technical Honor Society
- Pennsylvania Home Builders Association
- SkillsUSA
- Student Council
- Students Against Destructive Decisions (SADD)
