= Tent Presbyterian Church =

Historic Presbyterian church in Pennsylvania

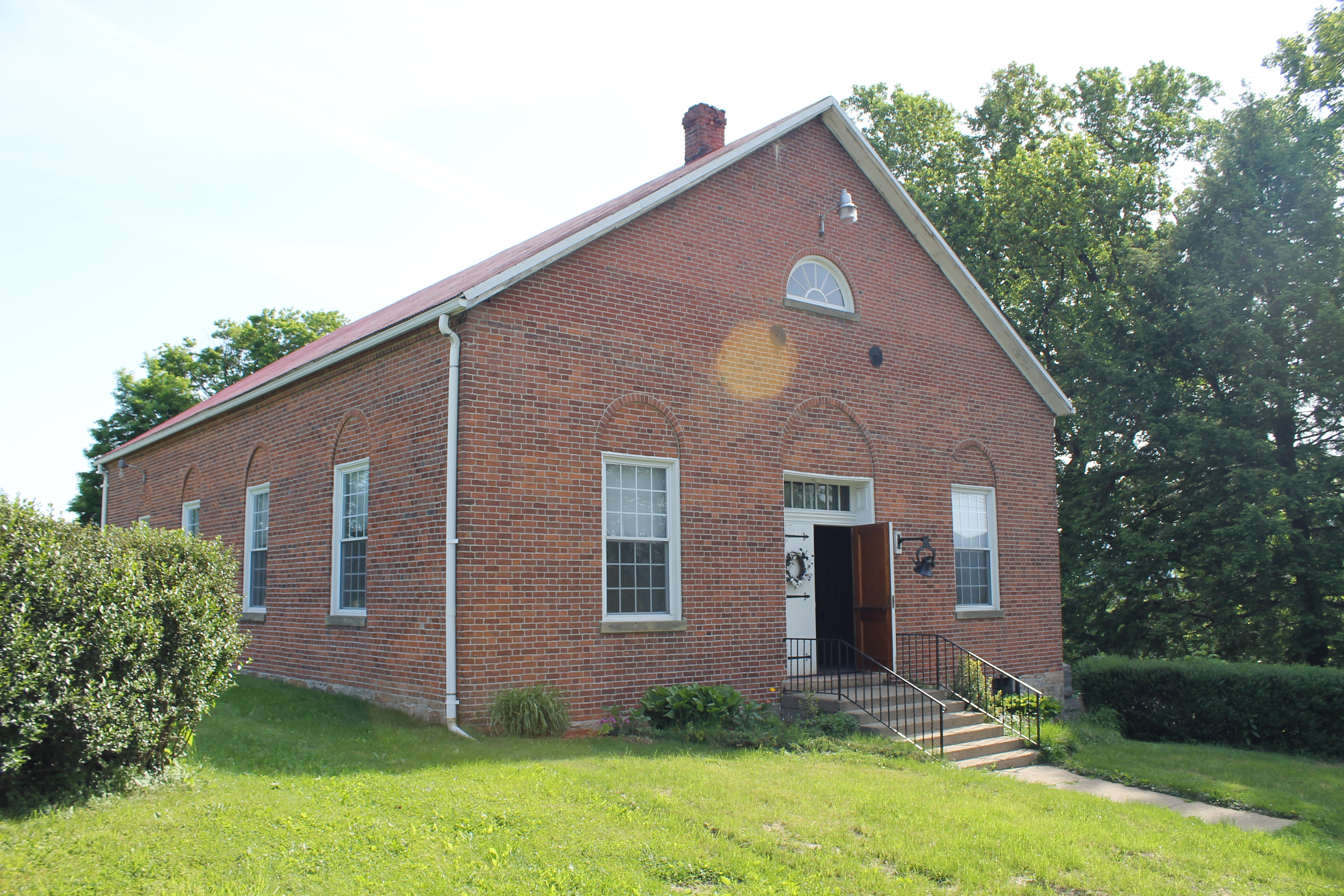
- The 1832 brick meetinghouse of Tent Presbyterian Church.
- Tent Presbyterian Church
- 39.853594°N 79.757913°W
- Location: Georges Township, near Uniontown
- Country: United States
- Denomination: Presbyterian Church (U.S.A.)

Architecture
- Style: Vernacular brick

Clergy
- Pastor: Jeff Smith

Tent Presbyterian Church, colloquially known as "Tent Church", is a Presbyterian Church (U.S.A.) congregation in Georges Township, Pennsylvania. Established in 1773, it has conducted continuous worship services since its founding. The church derives its name from the canvas tent used for early services. It is located at 275 Tent Church Road.

The brick meetinghouse was completed in 1832. During the 1905 Rand Powder Mill explosion in nearby Fairchance, the building's windows were damaged.

The adjacent cemetery includes graves from the late 18th century, with interments of veterans from the American Revolutionary War, the War of 1812, and the Civil War. In 2023, the congregation was honored with state and federal recognition for its 250th anniversary, including a Congressional Record commendation.

== History ==
=== Founding and early years ===
Tent Presbyterian Church was established in 1773 by Scots‑Irish settlers, guided by itinerant minister Rev. Dr. James Power.

For its first 18 years, the congregation worshiped under a canvas tent. In 1781, it joined the newly established Presbytery of Redstone.

=== Construction and expansion ===
In 1792, the congregation built a log meetinghouse to replace the tent. Construction of the present brick church began c. 1827 and concluded in 1832.

During the demolition of the 1792 structure, the building collapsed, killing several church leaders.

=== 19th- and 20th-century developments ===
Rev. Ashbel Green Fairchild served as pastor from 1827 until 1864.

The cemetery expanded during this period and contains graves of veterans from the Revolutionary War, the War of 1812, and the Civil War. Late 19th-century governance records list active trustees.

In 1905, the church sustained minor damage from the Rand Powder Mill explosion in Fairchance. Architectural surveys conducted during the 1930s recorded its 19th-century design.

== Architecture and site ==
=== Building design and features ===
The 1832 brick meetinghouse exemplifies early 19th-century Presbyterian church architecture in western Pennsylvania. Constructed from brick, its design features rectangular massing and a central pulpit.

=== Surrounding grounds and accessibility ===
The church stands south of Uniontown, near the historic National Road (U.S. Route 40). Nearby streams include York Run and Browns Run.

== Cemetery ==
=== Establishment and layout ===
The cemetery contains over 400 documented burials.

=== Notable burials and memorials ===
A memorial commemorates Lt. Col. John B. McClelland (1734–1782), a Revolutionary War officer and delegate to Pennsylvania's 1776 Constitutional Convention. Although his remains were never recovered, the Sons of the American Revolution dedicated a marker in his honor in 2012.

Nearby graves include McClelland's wife, Martha Dale McClelland, and their son Ensign John McClelland, veterans of the Revolutionary War, the Whiskey Rebellion, and the War of 1812.

== Community role and legacy ==
=== Involvement in local events ===
The 1792 meetinghouse collapse caused multiple fatalities, including several church leaders. Later, the church sustained damage during the 1905 Rand Powder Mill explosion.

=== Modern activities and anniversaries ===
In 2023, Tent Presbyterian Church held a public service marking its 250th anniversary. The event received recognition from Pennsylvania Governor Josh Shapiro and U.S. Representative Guy Reschenthaler.

== Affiliation and governance ==
=== Denominational ties ===
Tent Presbyterian Church is a congregation of the Presbyterian Church (U.S.A.) within the Presbytery of Redstone. Established in the 1780s, it has maintained continuous affiliation with the presbytery through denominational reorganizations, including those of 1958 and 1983.

== Leadership and membership ==
The congregation's early ministers included itinerant preachers like Rev. Dr. James Powers. Rev. Ashbel Green Fairchild served from 1827 to 1864.

Later pastors included Reverend George M. Hickok (early 2000s) and Reverend Jeff Smith (from 2020).

== See also ==
- Presbyterianism in the United States
- History of Pennsylvania
