= Albert Gallatin High School =

Coordinates: 39.832064°N 79.783552°W

Location
- 1119 Township Drive; Georges Township, Fayette County, Pennsylvania; Uniontown, Pennsylvania 15401

Information
- School type: Public high school
- Established: 1961; 65 years ago
- School district: Albert Gallatin Area School District
- NCES District ID: 4202100
- NCES School ID: 420210006001
- Principal: Eric Witt
- Teaching staff: 61.85 (on an FTE basis)
- Grades: 9–12
- Enrollment: 1,150 (2024–2025)
- Student to teacher ratio: 15.46
- Colors: Black and silver
- Athletics conference: [PIAA] District VII
- Nickname: AG
- Team name: Colonials
- Rival: Laurel Highlands Uniontown
- Communities served: Fairchance, Masontown, Point Marion, Smithfield
- Feeder schools: AG North Middle School; AG South Middle School
- Website: Albert Gallatin High School
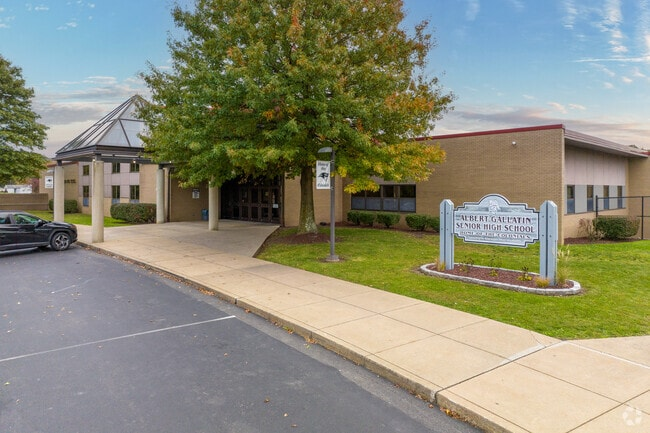
- Main entrance

Albert Gallatin High School is a public high school, serving 1,150 students (2024–2025) in the eight southwestern municipalities of Fayette County, Pennsylvania. The school is located in Georges Township, five miles south of Uniontown.

== History ==
Albert Gallatin High School was created in 1961, consolidating the Masontown and Point Marion high schools at the present-day AG Middle School South campus, near Point Marion. It was not until 1986 that the present building (the former Fairchance-Georges High School) was used as the sole high school for the district, merging all three (at that time) of the district's high schools and creating two middle schools. The name was briefly changed to Tri-Valley High School, representing the changes. Finally, in 1993, the school board renamed the school to its present name to reflect the founding father of the area, Albert Gallatin. Between 1993 and now, the school has undergone a complete renovation and addition process, as well as technology improvements and a new athletic complex, including a new fieldhouse.

For other historical views of the Albert Gallatin High School, back in 1995, students recorded videos on a handheld camera and uploaded them onto YouTube. These videos demonstrate how and what student life looked like back in 1995.

== Extracurriculars and athletics ==
A plethora of athletic sports programs and extracurricular activities are available at AG.

=== Athletics ===
Albert Gallatin High School is a member of the Pennsylvania Interscholastic Athletic Association (PIAA) and was a former member of the Western Pennsylvania Interscholastic Athletic League (WPIAL). Albert Gallatin is in PIAA District 7. In 2019, the football program chose to become independent of the WPIAL.

==== Boys ====
- Baseball - AAAA
- Basketball - AAAA 06-07 WPIAL runner-up
- Cross Country - AAA
- Football - AAA
- Golf - AAAA
- Soccer - AAA
- Track and Field - AAA
- Wrestling - AAA

==== Girls ====
- Basketball - AAAA
- Cross Country - AAA
- Soccer - AAA
- Softball - AAAA
- Track and Field - AAA
- Volleyball - AAA

=== Clubs ===
- AGTV
- AGSN
- Art Club
- Bleacher Creatures
- Book Club
- Drama
- Interact Club
- AGHS NAACP Chapter
- Ski Club
- Yearbook
- E-Sports

=== Extracurricular Activities ===
- AGHS band
- Freshman Class
- Sophomore Class
- Junior Class
- Senior Class
- Future Business Leaders of America (FBLA)
- Future Educators of America
- JROTC
- The Gallatin Gazette
- SADD
- Student Council
- Senior Class Trip
