= Laurel Highlands High School =

Location
- 300 Bailey Avenue; North Union Township, Fayette County, Pennsylvania; Uniontown, Pennsylvania 15401; 39°54′26″N 79°42′36″W

Information
- School type: Public High School
- Opened: 1972
- School district: Laurel Highlands School District
- NCES District ID: 4213320
- Superintendent: Jesse Wallace
- NCES School ID: 421332006600
- Principal: Bobbi Downs
- Teaching staff: 58.00 (FTE)
- Grades: 9-12
- Enrollment: 816 (2023–2024)
- Student to teacher ratio: 14.07
- Color
- Athletics conference: WPIAL (PIAA District VII)
- Mascot: Mustangs
- Nickname: LH
- Rival: Uniontown Albert Gallatin
- Feeder schools: Laurel Highlands Middle School
- Website: Laurel Highlands High School

Laurel Highlands High School is a public high school serving around 1,100 students in grades 9–12 from the outlying Uniontown, Pennsylvania city limits. Due to the campus' location, some students from Uniontown do attend Laurel Highlands for convenience.

== Creation and history ==
Laurel Highlands High School was created in 1967 by merging rival high schools, North Union and South Union. Students attended high school in their respective buildings until completion of the current campus in 1972. Minor upgrades were performed to the school in 1994. The most recent structural update was completed in 2015 with a $43 million renovation.

In March of 2026, two faculty members faced criminal charges including sexual assault, unlawful contact with minors, and corruption of minors. In response, both instructors, Martin Gatti and Daniel Cervone, were fired by the school board. Following these events, parents and other community members voiced their concerns over student safety and expressed a desire to have Jesse Wallace resign from his position as superintendent. During the Summer after these events, a third staff member was fired after being placed on leave in April over allegations of inappropriate behavior with a student in 2009, although the staff member remains unnamed.

In addition, a series of administrative changes followed which resulted in the movement of Bobbi Downs to serve as the principal of Laurel Highlands High School.

== Academics ==
According to the schools Curriculum Guide students need 25.5 credits in order to graduate, as well as complete a graduation project and career portfolio.

=== Credit structure ===
Subject Area	# Credits	Notes
English	4.0	Academic English I, II, III, IV
Social Studies	4.0	Civics, World History, American History, Political Science/Recent US History OR Geography/Economics
Science	4.0	Biology and three Science electives
Mathematics	4.0	Minimum of: Algebra 9, Algebra 10, Geometry 11, and Algebra 12
Health, Physical Education/Aquatics	2.5	Phys Ed. Each Year, Health in Sophomore Year
Arts or Humanities	2.0	Foreign Language, Art, Technology Education, Music, or Family/Consumer Science
Freshman Seminar	0.5	Grade 9 Required Course.
Other Areas	4.5	Courses vary depending on which curricula the student participates in or if goes to Fayette County Career and Technical Institute.
TOTAL	25.5	

=== Course offerings ===
- English
- Social Studies
- Science
- Mathematics
- Physical Education/Health/Aquatics
- World Language: Including courses in French, Spanish, and Foreign Cultures
- Business Education: Including tourism courses
- Air Force/JROTC
- Technology Education: Including courses in CADD, as well as an introductory course to the Natural Gas industry in the area.
- Family/Consumer Sciences
- Music
- Art
- Driver's Education

=== Vocational Education Opportunity ===
Students in Grades 10–12 have the opportunity to attend the Fayette County Career and Technical Institute in Georges Township for one-half day, each day while attending their home school the other half of the day.

== Athletics ==
Sport	Boys	Girls
Baseball	Class AAAA	
Basketball	Class AAAAA	Class AAAA
Cross Country	Class AAA	Class AAA
Football	Class AAAA	
Soccer	Class AAA	Class AAA
Golf	Class AAA	
Swimming and Diving	Class AAA	Class AAA
Track and Field	Class AAA	Class AAA
Softball		Class AAA
Wrestling	Class AAA	
Volleyball		Class AAA

== Notable alumni ==
- Mark Esper, former U.S. Secretary of Defense
- Gus Gerard, former professional basketball player, Denver Nuggets, Detroit Pistons, and San Antonio Spurs
- David Nehls, actor, singer, composer, and lyricist
- Peter M. Rhee, surgeon
- Wil Robinson, former ABA basketball player
- Terry Mulholland, former professional baseball player, Philadelphia Phillies and other teams
- Kaleb Ramsey, former professional football player, San Francisco 49ers
- Gene Steratore, former National Football League referee
- Rodney Gallagher III, current Arizona Wildcats football player
