= Uniontown Area High School =

Coordinates: 39.89632°N 79.72016°W

Location
- 146 East Fayette Street; Uniontown, Pennsylvania 15401

Information
- School type: Public High School
- Opened: 1910
- School district: Uniontown Area
- Superintendent: Charles D. Manchesky
- Staff: 55.80 (FTE)
- Grades: 9-12
- Enrollment: 793 (2018–19)
- Student to teacher ratio: 14.21
- Color
- Athletics conference: Pennsylvania Interscholastic Athletic Association District VII (Western Pennsylvania Interscholastic Athletic League)
- Team name: Red Raiders
- Rival: Albert Gallatin Laurel Highlands
- Communities served: Uniontown, Markleysburg, Ohiopyle
- Feeder schools: A.J. McMullen Middle School; Ben Franklin Middle School; LaFayette Middle School
- Website: Uniontown Area High School

Uniontown Area High School is a comprehensive public high school serving around 975 students in grades 9-12 who reside in the Uniontown Area School District in Fayette County, Pennsylvania.

== History ==
Uniontown opened in 1911 and was renovated and added in 1954 and 1979 and has a gymnasium with balconies, an auditorium, natatorium, woodshop, metal shop, and graphics shop. As of January 2012, the school is undergoing renovations to relieve overcrowding issues and aging to the existing structure. In January 2018, a mass shooting was averted when a student was discovered with multiple weapons at his house.

== Graduation requirements ==
All students are required to complete 26 credits of coursework, as well as complete a graduation project and score proficient or above on the Pennsylvania System of State Assessments. The breakdown in how a student earns their credits depends on whether or not they attend the Fayette County Career and Technical Institute.

=== Coursework Breakdown ===
Subject Area	UHS	UHS/FCCTI	Notes
English	4.0	4.0	One credit each year
Social Studies	4.0	3.0	PA History/Civics, World Cultures, American History and Economics (0.5). Students may choose from POD, Psychology and African-American Studies for the remaining 1/2. For FCCTI students:PA History/Civics, World History (.5), US History (.5) and Economics (.5). Students may choose from POD, Psychology and African American Studies for the remaining one-half (.5) credit.
Mathematics	4.0	4.0	
Science	4.0	3.0	
Computer Science	1.0	0.5	
Health/Physical Education	1.5	1.5	One PE Course each year, including one in Aquatics.
Electives / FCCTI	6.5	12.0	
TOTAL	26.0	28.0	

== Course offerings ==
UHS is several course offerings, including:

- Business/Computer/Information Technology - Including a Graphic Arts program
- Health and Physical Education
- Fine Arts - Music and Art
- World Languages - Including French and Spanish
- Language Arts
- Mathematics
- Practical Arts (Family and Consumer Sciences/Technology Education) - Includes: Publications, Drafting and Design, Manufacturing, Construction and Agile Robotics
- Science
- Social Studies

=== Vocational Education ===
Students in grades 10-12 have the opportunity to attend the Fayette County Career and Technical Institute in nearby Georges Township part-time if they wish to pursue a certain trade that they offer.

== Athletics ==
Uniontown is a member of the Western Pennsylvania Interscholastic Athletic League, which is District VII (7) of the Pennsylvania Interscholastic Athletic Association.

Sport	Boys	Girls
Baseball	Class AAA	
Basketball	Class AAA	Class AAA
Cross Country	Class AAA	Class AAA
Football	Class AAA	
Golf	Class AAA	
Soccer	Class AA	Class AAA
Swimming and Diving	Class AA	Class AA
Track and Field	Class AAA	Class AAA
Volleyball		Class AA

== Notable alumni ==
- Harry Clarke, former NFL player
- Tory Epps, former NFL player
- John D. Faris, American Chorbishop
- Caitlin O'Connor, Actress and TV Host
- Ben Gregory, former NFL player
- Gene Huey, former NFL player
- Tom Hull, former NFL player
- Charley Hyatt, Naismith Basketball Hall of Fame inductee
- Stu Lantz, former NBA player and broadcaster
- Pete Marcus, former NFL player
- Roger Miller, former MLB player
- Chuck Muncie, former NFL player
- Bill Munsey, former CFL player
- Nelson Munsey, former NFL player
- Ray Parson, former NFL player
- Sandy Stephens, former CFL player
