= Brownsville Area High School =

Public school in Pennsylvania, US

Coordinates: 39.96925°N 79.87697°W

Location
- 9 Brasher Avenue; Brownsville, Fayette County and Washington County, Pennsylvania, Pennsylvania 15417

Information
- School type: Public high school
- Established: 1966
- School district: Brownsville Area School District
- NCES District ID: 4204080
- NCES School ID: 420408004818
- Principal: Jason Kushak
- Teaching staff: 31.33 (FTE)
- Grades: 9–12
- Enrollment: 425 (2023–2024)
- Student to teacher ratio: 13.57
- Colors: Black and gold
- Athletics conference: WPIAL / PIAA District VII
- Team name: Falcons
- Communities served: Brownsville, West Brownsville
- Feeder schools: Brownsville Area Middle School
- Website: www.basd.org/o/bahs

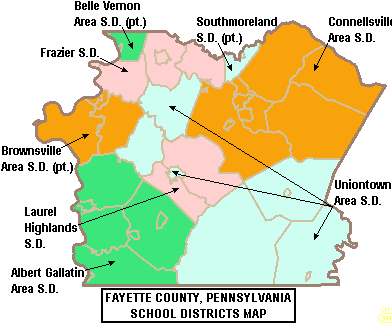
Map of Fayette County, Pennsylvania public school districts showing Brownsville Area SD in orange

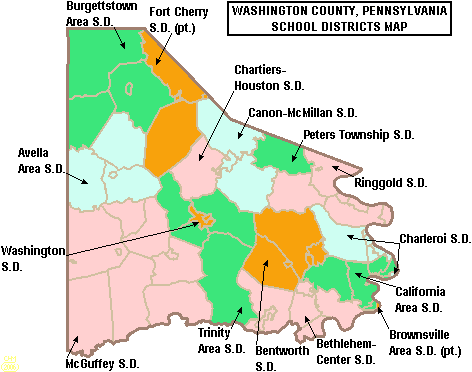
Map of Washington County, Pennsylvania public school districts showing Brownsville Area SD in orange

Brownsville Area High School is a small, rural public high school serving students in southwestern Pennsylvania, near the Monongahela River. It serves students living in the Borough of Brownsville and Brownsville Township, Luzerne Township and Redstone Township in Fayette County. In Washington County, Pennsylvania it serves the Borough of West Brownsville. In the 2017–2018 school year, enrollment was reported as 471.

Brownsville Area High School students may choose to attend the Fayette County Career and Technical Institute for training in the construction and mechanical trades. Fayette County Career and Technical Institute is located in Georges Township. Students attend for one-half day, each day while attending their home school the other half of the school day. The school offers school to career classes and dual enrollment courses in cooperation with Westmoreland County Community College.

The Intermediate Unit IU1 provides the district with a wide variety of services like specialized education for disabled students and hearing, background checks for employees, state mandated recognizing and reporting child abuse training, speech and visual disability services and criminal background check processing for prospective employees and professional development for staff and faculty.

== Creation and history ==
Brownsville Area High School was constructed in the mid-1960s to accommodate students in the newly created Brownsville Area School District, which resulted in the consolidation of the Redstone Township, Luzerne Township, and Brashear High Schools. There was an addition in 1972. The school district closed Redstone Middle School in 2001 and moved the students to the High School until a $17 Million Addition/Renovation process was completed in 2005, at which time the Middle School was placed into its separate facility.

== Extracurriculars ==
Brownsville Area High School offers a variety of clubs, activities and an extensive, publicly funded, sports program.

=== Athletics ===
Sport	Boys	Girls
Baseball	Class AA	
Basketball	Class AA	Class AA
Cross Country	Class AA	Class AA
Football	Class AA	
Golf	Class AAAA	
Soccer	Class AA	
Softball		Class AA
Tennis	Class AA	Class AA
Track and Field	Class AA	Class AA
Volleyball		Class AA

According to PIAA directory July 2015

== Notable alumni ==
- Ed Roebuck (1949) – professional baseball pitcher, 1955 World Series Champion
- Vinnie Colaiuta (1974) – Drummer
- Doug Dascenzo (1982) – professional baseball player who played for eight MLB seasons
- Tessa Dellarose (2022) - soccer player for the North Carolina Tar Heels, represents United States internationally
