= 1989 Southeastern Conference baseball tournament =

- Teams: 6
- Format: Six-team double elimination tournament
- Finals site: Alfred A. McKethan Stadium; Gainesville, Florida
- Champions: Auburn (2nd title)
- Winning coach: Hal Baird (1st title)
- MVP: Roger Miller (Georgia)
- Attendance: 22,507

1989 Southeastern Conference baseball standings
	Conf.				Overall
Team	W		L	PCT	W		L	PCT
No. 10 Mississippi State ‍†‍‍^{y}	20	–	5	.800	54	–	14	.794
No. 4 LSU ‍‍‍^{y}	18	–	9	.667	55	–	17	.764
Florida ‍‍‍^{y}	14	–	10	.583	44	–	22	.667
Georgia ‍‍‍	15	–	11	.577	37	–	25	.597
Alabama ‍‍‍	15	–	11	.577	32	–	24	.571
Auburn ‍‍‡‍^{y}	12	–	12	.500	44	–	20	.688
Vanderbilt ‍‍‍	11	–	15	.423	31	–	21	.596
Ole Miss ‍‍‍	9	–	15	.375	34	–	21	.618
Kentucky ‍‍‍	10	–	17	.370	28	–	25	.528
Tennessee ‍‍‍	4	–	23	.148	23	–	36	.390
† – Conference champion ‡ – Tournament champion y – Invited to the NCAA tournament As of June 30, 1989; Rankings from Collegiate Baseball

The 1989 Southeastern Conference baseball tournament was held at Perry Field in Gainesville, Florida, United States, from May 11 to May 14. Auburn won the tournament and earned the Southeastern Conference's automatic bid to the 1989 NCAA tournament.

== Regular-season results ==
Team	W	L	Pct	GB	Seed
Mississippi State	20	5	.800	—	1
LSU	18	9	.667	3	2
Florida	14	10	.583	5.5	3
Alabama	15	11	.577	5.5	4
Georgia	15	11	.577	5.5	5
Auburn	12	12	.500	7.5	6
Vanderbilt	11	15	.423	9.5	—
Ole Miss	9	15	.346	10.5	—
Kentucky	10	17	.370	11	—
Tennessee	4	23	.148	17	—

== Tournament ==
First round
1	Mississippi State	3
6	Auburn	5
2	LSU	6
5	Georgia	3
3	Florida	7
4	Alabama	6

Second round
6	Auburn	8
5	Georgia	9
1	Mississippi State	11
4	Alabama	10
2	LSU	6
3	Florida	8
6	Auburn	8
2	LSU	5

Third round
5	Georgia	15
1	Mississippi State	6
3	Florida	2
6	Auburn	4

Semifinals
5	Georgia	16
3	Florida	1

Final
5	Georgia	1
6	Auburn	2

== All-Tournament Team ==
Position	Player	School
1B	Frank Thomas	Auburn
2B	David J. Harrison	Auburn
SS	J.R. Showalter	Georgia
3B	Jeff Cooper	Georgia
C	Roger Miller	Georgia
OF	Clark Preble	Auburn
OF	Chris Hart	Auburn
OF	Bruce Chick	Georgia
DH	Brian Jester	Georgia
P	Dave Fleming	Georgia
P	Tommy Youngblood	Auburn
MVP	Roger Miller	Georgia

== See also ==
- College World Series
- NCAA Division I Baseball Championship
- Southeastern Conference baseball tournament
