= Columbia Rolling Mill =

Iron and steel works in Pennsylvania, US

Coordinates: 39.9089°N 79.7233°W

The Columbia Rolling Mill, an iron and steel works, operated in Uniontown, Pennsylvania, from 1887 to 1895. In 1895 it was sold to Andrew Carnegie, who moved the mill to Homestead, Pennsylvania. The mill was Uniontown's largest industry in the early 1890s.

== History ==
The Columbia Rolling Mill had a substantial number of employees, especially in its first years of operation. It was serviced by the Baltimore and Ohio Railroad. The mill reported marginal gains in 1887, 1888, and 1889. Although the gains were small, it proved those who thought the mill would quickly fold to be wrong. A small-scale strike hampered the mill in 1890. In 1891 and 1892, the mill reported losses. However, in 1893 the mill recovered and in 1894, the mill took in substantial gains. 1895 appeared to be another solid year, when suddenly, the mill was sold and moved. Andrew Carnegie paid an impressive sum for the mill and many Uniontown citizens lost their jobs.

The Columbia Rolling Mill had since been a topic of great controversy in Uniontown. In the late 19th century, Pittsburgh, Pennsylvania was gaining footing as an iron and steel producing giant. Andrew Carnegie had fabulous transportation services, thanks to the Monongahela, Allegheny, and Ohio Rivers, and to the railroads servicing Pittsburgh. Much of the coal that was used in the Pittsburgh mills was obtained from the hills surrounding Connellsville, Pennsylvania, a neighboring town to Uniontown. Supposedly, Carnegie feared that a mill in Uniontown could lead to an Uniontown and Connellsville alliance that could hurt his profits. Uniontown was considerably closer to the rich coal fields than Pittsburgh, thus transportation costs will be cheaper. While Uniontown had no major waterways, the neighboring town of Brownsville, Pennsylvania, a shipbuilding center, was located on the Monongahela River. If Carnegie would not have seized the Columbia Rolling Mill before he did, other mills may have opened in the Uniontown area, causing problems for Carnegie.

In 1899, the joint stock company Steacy and Denney consolidated the Columbia Rolling Mill with Vesta Furnace and the York Rolling Mill. The new company was called the Susquehanna Iron and Steel Co., and was capitalized at $1.5 million the following year.
