= Shoaf Historic District =

Historic district in Pennsylvania, United States

- U.S. National Register of Historic Places
- U.S. Historic district
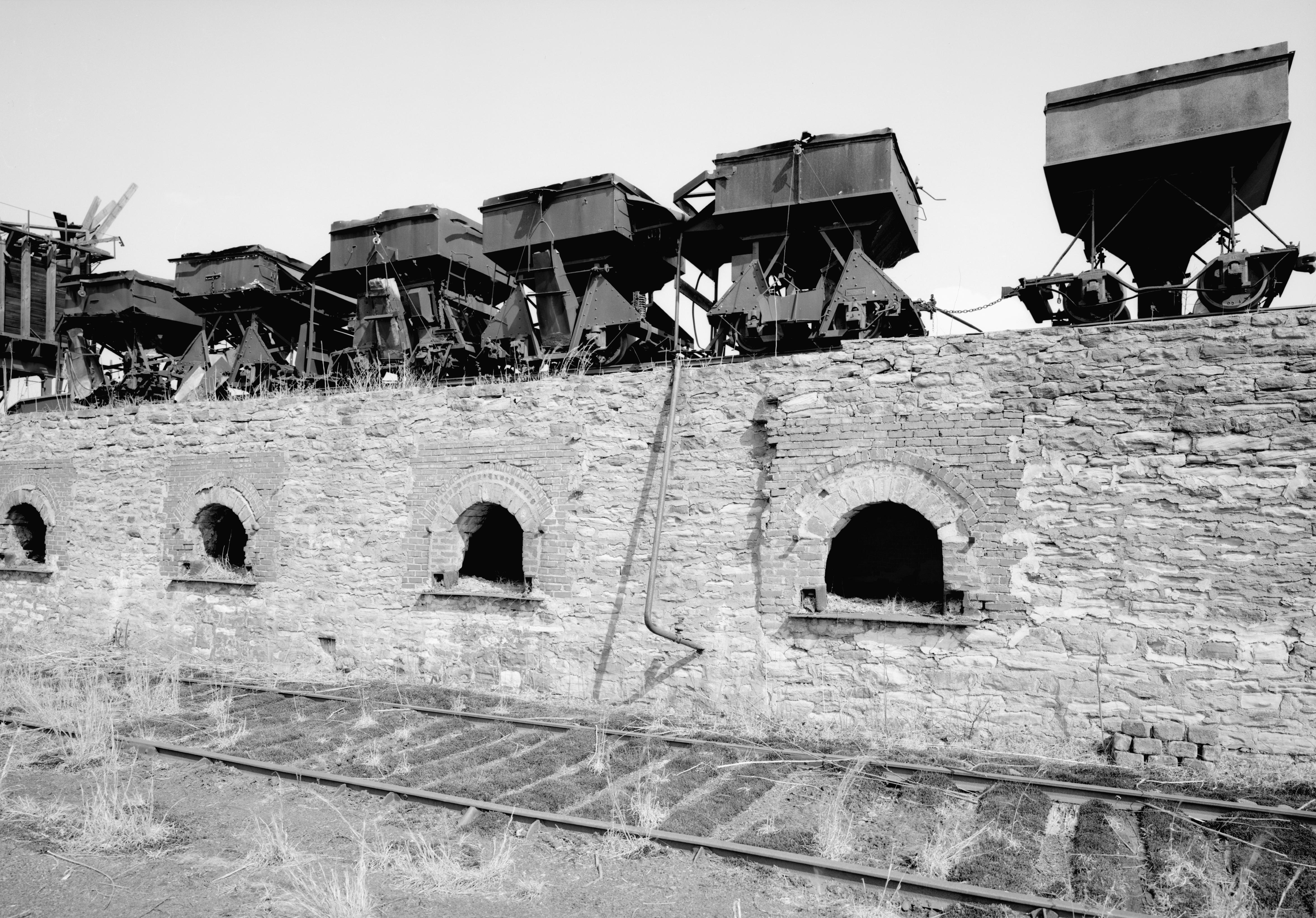
- Coke ovens at Shoaf, April 1991

- Location within Pennsylvania Location within the United States
- Location: Roughly bounded by Nos. 1-170 First St., Second St., processing buildings and the bank of coke ovens, Georges Township, Pennsylvania
- Coordinates: 39°50′31″N 79°48′32″W
- Area: 38.5 acres (15.6 ha)
- Built: 1904
- MPS: Bituminous Coal and Coke Resources of Pennsylvania MPS
- NRHP reference No.: 94000518
- Added to NRHP: June 3, 1994

The Shoaf Historic District is a national historic district that is located in Georges Township, Fayette County, Pennsylvania.

It was added to the National Register of Historic Places in 1994.

== History and architectural features ==
This district includes thirty-nine contributing buildings, one contributing site, and five contributing structures related to coke production in the community of Shoaf. The community was first established between 1903 and 1905 by the H. C. Frick & Company; most of the contributing buildings were built between 1903 and the 1920s. The workers' housing largely consists of semi-detached frame dwellings. Mine and processing-related buildings and structures include three original batteries of coke ovens (c. 1904), a wood and steel tipple (c. 1905), a mine entrance tipple (c. 1904), a brick power house (1905), a brick blacksmith and carpenter shop (1910), and a concrete block supply house (c. 1919). Other buildings include the St. Helen's Roman Catholic Church rectory and a multiple-car garage (1922).
