= Brownsville Area School District =

School district in Fayette County, Pennsylvania, USA

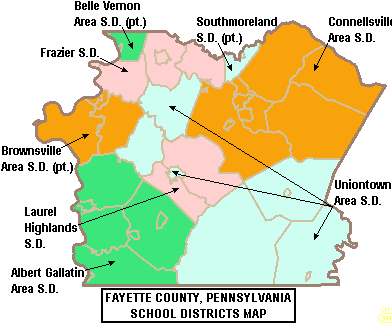

Address
- 1025 Lewis Street Brownsville, Pennsylvania, 15417; United States

District information
- Type: Public
- Established: 1966
- School board: 9 locally elected school board members serve 4-year terms

Students and staff
- District mascot: Falcons
- Colors: Black, white and gold

Other information
- Website: www.basd.org

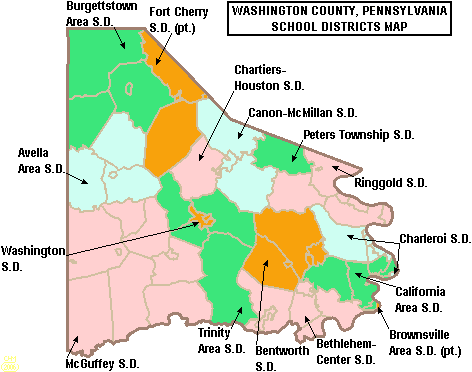
Map of Washington County, Pennsylvania public school districts showing the portion of Brownsville Area SD

The Brownsville Area School District spans portions of two counties. In Fayette County, Pennsylvania it covers the Borough of Brownsville and Brownsville Township, Luzerne Township and Redstone Township in Fayette County. In Washington County, Pennsylvania it covers a portion of the Borough of West Brownsville. Brownsville Area School District encompasses approximately 57 square miles. According to 2000 federal census data, it served a resident population of 15,097. By 2010, the district's population declined to 14,959 people per the US Census Bureau. The educational attainment levels for the Brownsville Area School District population (25 years old and over) were 80% high school graduates and 9.9% college graduates. The district is one of the 500 public school districts of Pennsylvania.

According to the Pennsylvania Budget and Policy Center, 64.7% of the district's pupils lived at 185% or below the Federal Poverty Level as shown by their eligibility for the federal free or reduced price school meal programs in 2012. In 2013 the Pennsylvania Department of Education, reported that 73 students in the Brownsville Area School District were homeless. In 2009, Brownsville Area School District residents' per capita income was $15,486 a year, while the median family income was $32,956 a year. In the Commonwealth, the median family income was $49,501 and the United States median family income was $49,445, in 2010. In Fayette County, the median household income was $39,115. By 2013, the median household income in the United States rose to $52,100. In 2014, the median household income in the USA was $53,700.

Brownsville Area School District operates one Middle School and one High School in a single building and one elementary school located in on one campus in Luzerne Township. High school students may choose to attend the Fayette County Career and Technical Institute for training in the construction and mechanical trades. The Intermediate Unit IU1 provides the district with a wide variety of services like specialized education for disabled students and hearing, background checks for employees, state mandated recognizing and reporting child abuse training, speech and visual disability services and criminal background check processing for prospective employees and professional development for staff and faculty.

The district was created in 1966 as a merger of the Brashear, Redstone Township, and Luzerne Township School Districts.

== Extracurriculars ==
Brownsville Area School District offers a variety of clubs, activities and an extensive, publicly funded sports program.

=== Sports ===
The district funds:

Varsity

Boys

- Baseball - AA
- Basketball- AA
- Cross country - AA
- Football - AA
- Golf - AA
- Soccer - A
- Swimming and diving - AA
- Tennis - AA
- Track and field - AA
- Wrestling - AA

Girls

- Basketball - AA
- Cross country - A
- Golf - AA
- Soccer (fall) - A
- Softball - AA
- Swimming and diving - AA
- Girls' tennis - AA
- Track and field - AA
- Volleyball - A

Middle school sports

Boys

- Baseball
- Basketball
- Football
- Soccer
- Track and field
- Wrestling

Girls

- Basketball
- Soccer (fall)
- Softball
- Track and field
- Volleyball

According to PIAA directory July 2015

== Closed schools ==
Cardale Elementary school was closed in 2012, due to decline in enrollment. The building was sold in 2012. The school was located at 112 Thornton Road, Brownsville. The school was built in 1962.

The district has also closed: Colonial Elementary School (2001), Hiller Elementary School (2001) and Redstone Middle School (2001). In 1966, the state of Pennsylvania mandated that Redstone Township's schools be merged with the Brownsville Area School District beginning with the 1967 school year.
