= Doug Dascenzo =

American baseball player and coach (born 1964)

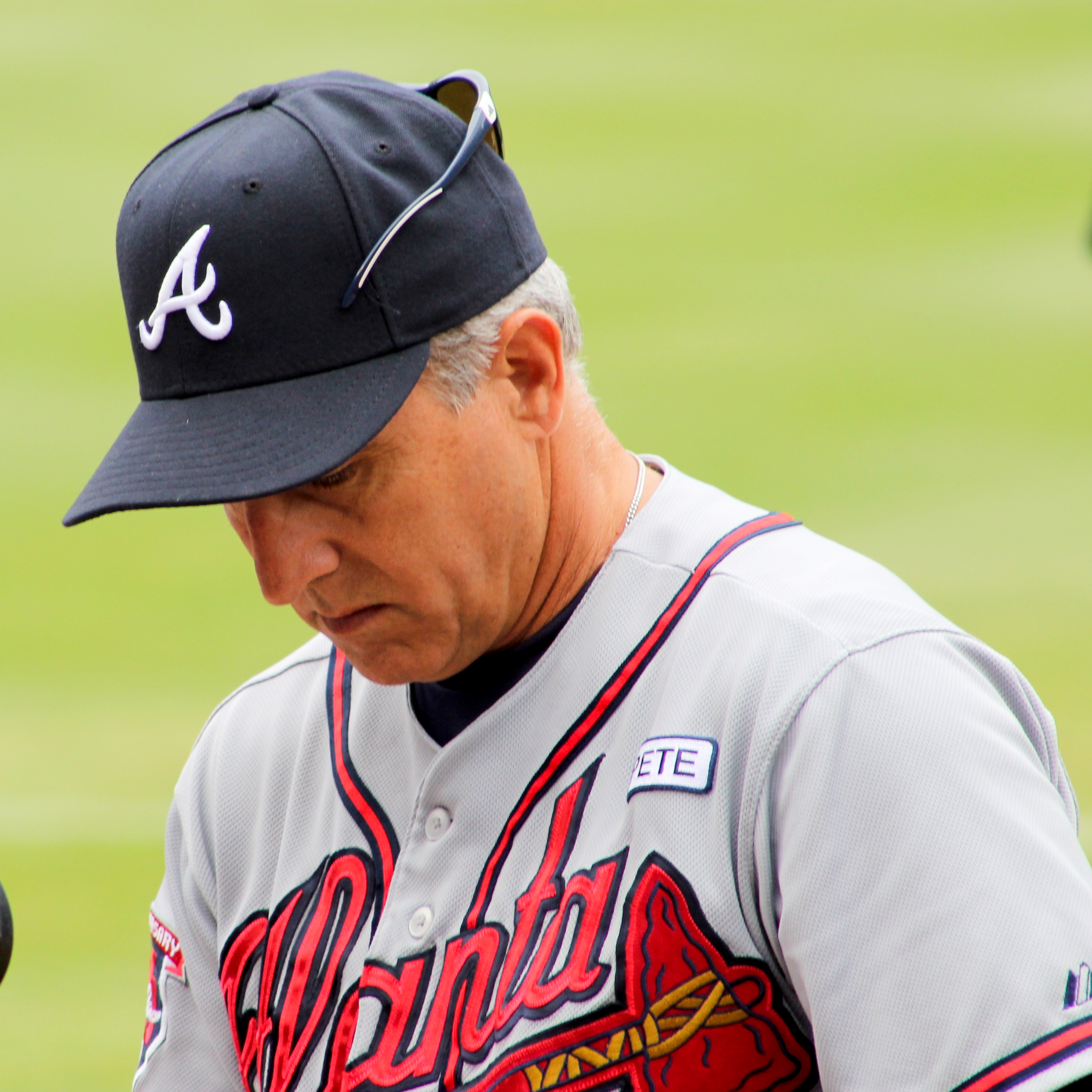
- Dascenzo with the Atlanta Braves (2014)
- Outfielder
- Born: June 30, 1964 (age 62); Cleveland, Ohio, U.S.
- Batted: Switch Threw: Left

MLB debut
- September 12, 1988, for the Chicago Cubs

Last MLB appearance
- September 29, 1996, for the San Diego Padres

MLB statistics
- Batting average: .234
- Home runs: 5
- Runs batted in: 90
- Stats at Baseball Reference

Teams
- Chicago Cubs (1988–1992); Texas Rangers (1993); San Diego Padres (1996)

Douglas Craig Dascenzo (born June 30, 1964) is an American professional baseball coach. The former Major League Baseball outfielder played for the Chicago Cubs, Texas Rangers, and San Diego Padres, where he began his coaching career. He spent 2014 as a third base coach for the Atlanta Braves, and is currently a coach for the Chicago Cubs affiliate Tennessee Smokies.

== Playing career ==
As a player, Dascenzo was a switch hitter who threw left-handed; he stood 5 feet 7 inches (1.70 m) tall and weighed 150 pounds (68 kg). He is an alumnus of Oklahoma State University and a graduate of Brownsville Area High School in Brownsville, Pennsylvania. Drafted by the Chicago Cubs in the 12th round of the 1985 MLB amateur draft, Dascenzo made his Major League Baseball debut with the Chicago Cubs on September 2, 1988, and appeared in his final game on September 29, 1996.

Dascenzo began his Major League career by playing in a then-National League record 241 consecutive games without making an error. The streak spanned from his debut in 1988 to the 1991 season, when he committed his first error in a game on August 25. He finished his career with a .990 fielding percentage playing at all three outfield positions, committing only eight errors in 792 total chances.

During the 1990 and 1991 seasons with the Chicago Cubs, Dascenzo made a total of four appearances as a relief pitcher. He pitched for a total of five innings, giving up three hits, two bases on balls, and achieving two strike outs.

== Coaching career ==
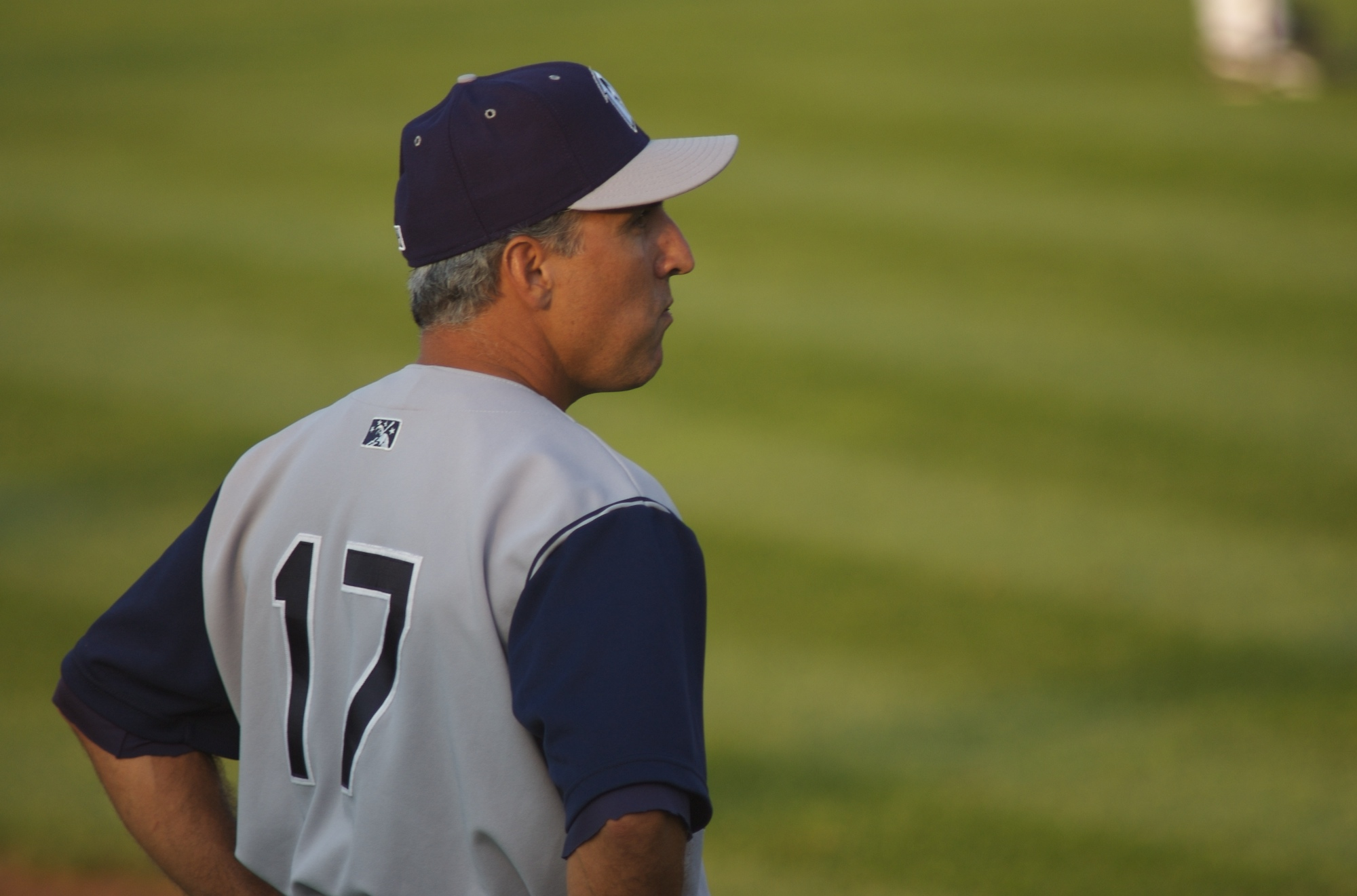
Dascenzo in 2007

Dascenzo ended his career as a member of the San Diego Padres organization after the 1996 season and took a job with the team as a roving minor league instructor. He made his managerial debut with the Padres' Northwest League affiliate, the Eugene Emeralds, in 2006 where he guided the Ems to a 43-33 finish. He was promoted to manage the Fort Wayne Wizards in the Midwest League in 2007. In 2009, the Wizards became the Fort Wayne TinCaps which he led to the Midwest League championship in the 2009 season, after they swept the Burlington Bees, 3–0.

On December 1, 2009, Dascenzo was named the manager of the Double-A San Antonio Missions of the Texas League. He was named Texas League Manager of the Year (2011) after leading the Missions to the Texas League Championship.

In October 2011, Doug accepted a position with the Atlanta Braves as their minor league base running and outfield coordinator.

On October 14, 2013, Dascenzo was promoted from the Minor Leagues to the Majors, given the position of third base coach due to Brian Snitker being promoted to the manager of the Braves Triple-A club. He was fired by the Braves at the end of the 2014 season and was replaced by Bo Porter. On October 9, 2014, Dascenzo was hired by the Chicago Cubs to serve as an outfield and first base coach. In 2016, he was the outfield coach only.

Preceded by Brian Snitker	Atlanta Braves third base coach 2014	Succeeded by Bo Porter
