= Gene Huey =

American football player and coach (born 1947)

No. 38
- Position: Defensive back

Personal information
- Born: July 20, 1947 (age 79); Uniontown, Pennsylvania, U.S.
- Listed height: 5 ft 11 in (1.80 m)
- Listed weight: 190 lb (86 kg)

Career information
- High school: Uniontown
- College: Wyoming
- NFL draft: 1969: 5th round, 123rd overall pick

Career history

Playing
- San Diego Chargers (1969)

Coaching
- Wyoming (1970–1971) Graduate assistant; New Mexico (1974–1975) Wide receivers coach; Nebraska (1976–1986) Wide receivers coach; Arizona State (1987) Wide receivers coach; Ohio State (1988–1990) Wide receivers coach; Ohio State (1991) Running backs coach; Indianapolis Colts (1992–2010) Running backs coach

Awards and highlights
- Super Bowl champion (XLI); University of Wyoming Hall of Fame inductee

Career NFL statistics
- Games played: 4
- Stats at Pro Football Reference

Eugene Aaron Huey (born July 20, 1947) is an American former professional football player who was a defensive back for the San Diego Chargers of the American Football League (AFL). He played college football for the Wyoming Cowboys and was selected by the St. Louis Cardinals in the sixth round of the 1969 NFL/AFL draft.

== Coaching career ==
Huey served as the running backs coach for the Indianapolis Colts from 1992 to 2010, making him the longest tenured coach of any position in franchise history. His 272 games coached is also the most for an assistant in team history. He was also a coach for the Wyoming Cowboys, New Mexico Lobos, Nebraska Cornhuskers, Arizona State Sun Devils, and Ohio State Buckeyes football teams.
