= Kaleb Ramsey =

American football player (born 1989)

No. 68
- Position: Defensive tackle

Personal information
- Born: June 20, 1989 (age 37); Uniontown, Pennsylvania, U.S.
- Listed height: 6 ft 3 in (1.91 m)
- Listed weight: 285 lb (129 kg)

Career information
- High school: North Union Township (PA) Laurel Highlands
- College: Boston College
- NFL draft: 2014: 7th round, 243rd overall pick

Career history
- San Francisco 49ers (2014–2015)
- Stats at Pro Football Reference

Kaleb J. Ramsey (born June 20, 1989) is an American former football defensive tackle. He was selected by the San Francisco 49ers in the seventh round of the 2014 NFL draft. He played college football at Boston College.

== Professional career ==
Ramsey was selected 243rd overall by the San Francisco 49ers in the seventh round of the 2014 NFL draft. He was placed on the physically unable to perform list for the start of the 2014 season due to an injury. He was released on September 5, 2015, in order for the 49ers to make their 53-man roster. He was re-signed on September 6, 2015, to the 49ers' practice squad.

On January 7, 2016, the 49ers signed Ramsey to a futures contract.

On July 28, 2016, Ramsey announced his retirement from the National Football League.
