= Adam Clarke Nutt Mansion =

Historic house in Pennsylvania, United States

- U.S. National Register of Historic Places
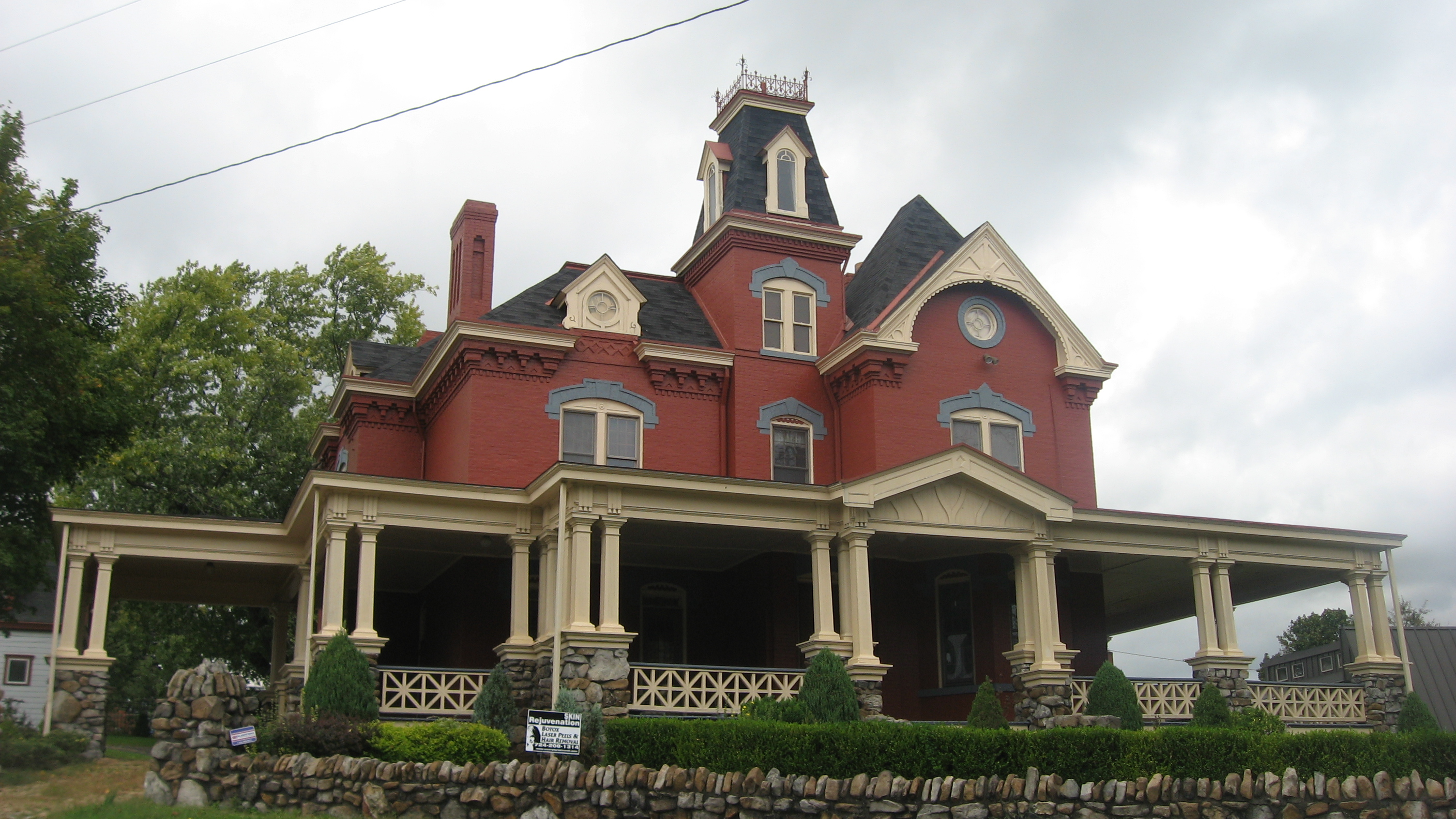
- Adam Clarke Nutt Mansion, September 2011

- Location within Pennsylvania Location within the United States
- Location: 26 Nutt Ave., Uniontown, Pennsylvania
- Coordinates: 39°54′28″N 79°44′9″W
- Area: less than one acre
- Built: 1882
- Architectural style: Second Empire, Queen Anne
- NRHP reference No.: 90001607
- Added to NRHP: October 25, 1990

Adam Clarke Nutt Mansion is a historic mansion located at Uniontown, Fayette County, Pennsylvania. It was built in 1882, and is a large three-story, irregularly shaped brick dwelling in the Queen Anne style. A front porch and porte cochere were added sometime before 1912. It has a truncated hipped roof, four tall chimneys, and a centered tower section. The property includes a contributing fieldstone wall and a non-contributing two-story carriage house with a mansard roof in the Second Empire style.

It was added to the National Register of Historic Places in 1990.
