= Laurel Highlands School District =

School district in Pennsylvania

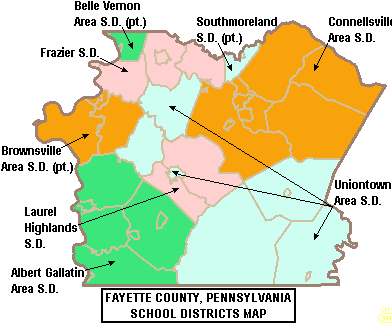

Address
- 304 Bailey Avenue Uniontown, Pennsylvania, 15401; United States

District information
- Type: Public
- Grades: K-12
- Established: 1965; 61 years ago
- NCES District ID: 4213320

Students and staff
- Enrollment: 2,743 (2020-2021)
- Staff: 190.00 (on an FTE basis)
- Student–teacher ratio: 14.44
- District mascot: Mustangs
- Colors: Red, white and blue

Other information
- Website: www.lhsd.org

Laurel Highlands School District is a public school district located in Fayette County, Pennsylvania, United States. It serves North and South Union Townships. Laurel Highlands School District encompasses approximately 55 square miles. According to the 2000 federal census, it serves a resident population of 25,477. The residents' per capita income was $16,768, while the median family income was $37,681 a year. In the Commonwealth, the median family income was $49,501 and the United States median family income was $49,445, in 2010. According to Laurel Highlands School District officials, for the school year 2020–2021, Laurel Highlands School District provided basic educational services to 2,743 pupils.

== History ==
LHSD was created in 1965, merging rivals North Union and South Union School Districts. The change did not become official until the 1967-1968 school term. Students attended high school in the former high schools until completion of the current high school in 1972.

== Schools ==
=== Elementary schools ===
- Hatfield Elementary - was constructed in 1952 and renovated in 1991. A new roof and windows were added in 2006. Hatfield is located in South Union Township and is named for the former Hatfield family farm on which the school's property was constructed on.
- Hutchinson Elementary - was built in 1965 and underwent a major renovation and addition in 2006. The school is located in the Hutchinson section of South Union Township.
- R.W. Clark Elementary - located near the High School, the school was built in 1962 and renovated in 2000. It is named after a former Laurel Highlands school principal.
- George C. Marshall Elementary - was constructed in 1966 and renovated in 1992. A four classroom addition was built in 2005. The school is named after the government official who was the secretary of state at one time in the 1940s.

John F. Kennedy Elementary School was part of the school district until it was closed after the 2003–2004 school year. It was later turned into a mental health treatment facility, called New Directions, for school age children.

=== Laurel Highlands Middle School ===
The building opened as South Laurel Junior High School in 1968, housing grades seven through nine. Originally, students from the district's three elementary schools in South Union Township (Areford, Hatfield, and Hutchinson) attended South Laurel Junior High. When North Laurel, the other junior high, was closed in 1984, it was renamed Laurel Highlands Junior High School. Ninth grade was moved to the high school, and the new merged junior high housed all Laurel Highlands students in grades seven and eight. After an extensive renovation was completed in August 2003, the school was renamed Laurel Highlands Middle School, with students in grades six through eight attending.

In 2026, mold and mildew were discovered in the school which prompted the district to bring in professionals to assess the damage. It was discovered that high humidity caused condensation to form on pipe insulation in the building.

== Laurel Highlands High School ==
- Laurel Highlands High School
  300 Bailey Avenue
  Uniontown, Pennsylvania 15401
