= Presbytery of Redstone =

Presbytery in Greensburg, Pennsylvania

- Logo of the Presbytery of Redstone
- Classification: Presbyterian Church (U.S.A.)
- Region: Westmoreland, Fayette, Somerset, and Cambria Counties (modern)
- Headquarters: Greensburg, Pennsylvania
- Origin: September 19, 1781; Pigeon Creek, Pennsylvania
- Official website: http://www.redstonepresbytery.org/

The Presbytery of Redstone is a presbytery of the Presbyterian Church (U.S.A.) governing congregations in Westmoreland, Fayette, Somerset, and Cambria Counties in Western Pennsylvania. Its headquarters are located in Greensburg, Pennsylvania. It governs 67 congregations and 8,249 total congregants as of 2022.

== History ==
The Presbytery of Redstone is currently part of the Synod of the Trinity; however, it was originally part of the Synod of New York and Philadelphia. It was organized on September 19, 1781, by the Synod of New York and Philadelphia. While the current territory of the presbytery consists of four counties in southwestern Pennsylvania, originally it stretched from the Allegheny Mountains to the east, as far north as Lake Erie, to the south to Virginia, and "on the west by the setting sun." The presbytery got its name "Redstone" from the rocks on the banks of Redstone Creek one mile below Brownsville. A vein of coal was set on fire one day either by Indians or the friction from a landslide, and when the fire died out it left behind a bank of "red stones". Redstone would have originally included all of the following present-day presbyteries: Redstone, Kiskiminetas, Pittsburgh, Washington, Beaver-Butler, Shenango, Lake Erie, Upper Ohio Valley, and West Virginia. The first meeting of the Presbyterian Church in Mount Pleasant, PA, originally named Mount Pleasant Presbyterian Church, occurred in 1772, when the Rev. David McClure met with a group of settlers to worship God at the current church site, then known as Jacob's Swamp. In 1776, the Rev. Dr. James Power, then 31 years old, brought his wife and four young daughters across the Alleghenies on horseback (with only three horses) to become the minister of Middle Presbyterian Church and the first ordained minister of any denomination to settle with a family in Western Pennsylvania. The first meeting of the presbytery on Sept. 19, 1781, was held at Pigeon Creek Church instead of Laurel Hill as originally planned because the incursions of Native Americans rendered it undesirable for the ministers and elders to go to Laurel Hill. Six persons attended the first meeting—Rev. John McMillan, Rev. James Power, and Rev. Thaddeus Dodd. Elders John Neal, Demas Lindley, and Patrick Scott. John Neal was an elder and founding member of Mount Pleasant Presbyterian Church (now called Middle Presbyterian Church of Mount Pleasant). John Neal is the brother of Robert Neal, who built the historic Neal Log House, which sits in Schenley Park in Pittsburgh, Pennsylvania.

Counties in the Presbytery of Redstone are shown in blue. Counties in the Synod of the Trinity are shown in red.
