= Roger Miller (baseball) =

American baseball player (1954–1993)

- Pitcher
- Born: August 1, 1954; Connellsville, Pennsylvania, U.S.
- Died: April 26, 1993 (aged 38); Mill Run, Pennsylvania, U.S.
- Batted: Right Threw: Right

MLB debut
- September 8, 1974, for the Milwaukee Brewers

Last MLB appearance
- September 13, 1974, for the Milwaukee Brewers

MLB statistics
- Win–loss record: 0–0
- Earned run average: 11.57
- Strikeouts: 2
- Stats at Baseball Reference

Teams
- Milwaukee Brewers (1974)

Roger Wesley Miller (August 1, 1954 – April 26, 1993) was an American Major League Baseball pitcher. Miller was drafted by the Milwaukee Brewers in the fifteenth round of the 1972 Major League Baseball draft and played at the Major League level with the team in 1974.

Roger was selected by the Milwaukee Brewers in the 15th round (342nd overall) of the 1972 MLB June Amateur Draft from Uniontown Area High School in Uniontown, PA.

Miller died in an explosion while working as a welder in a limestone mine in Fayette County, Pennsylvania.
