= Uniontown, Pennsylvania =

City in Pennsylvania, United States

- City
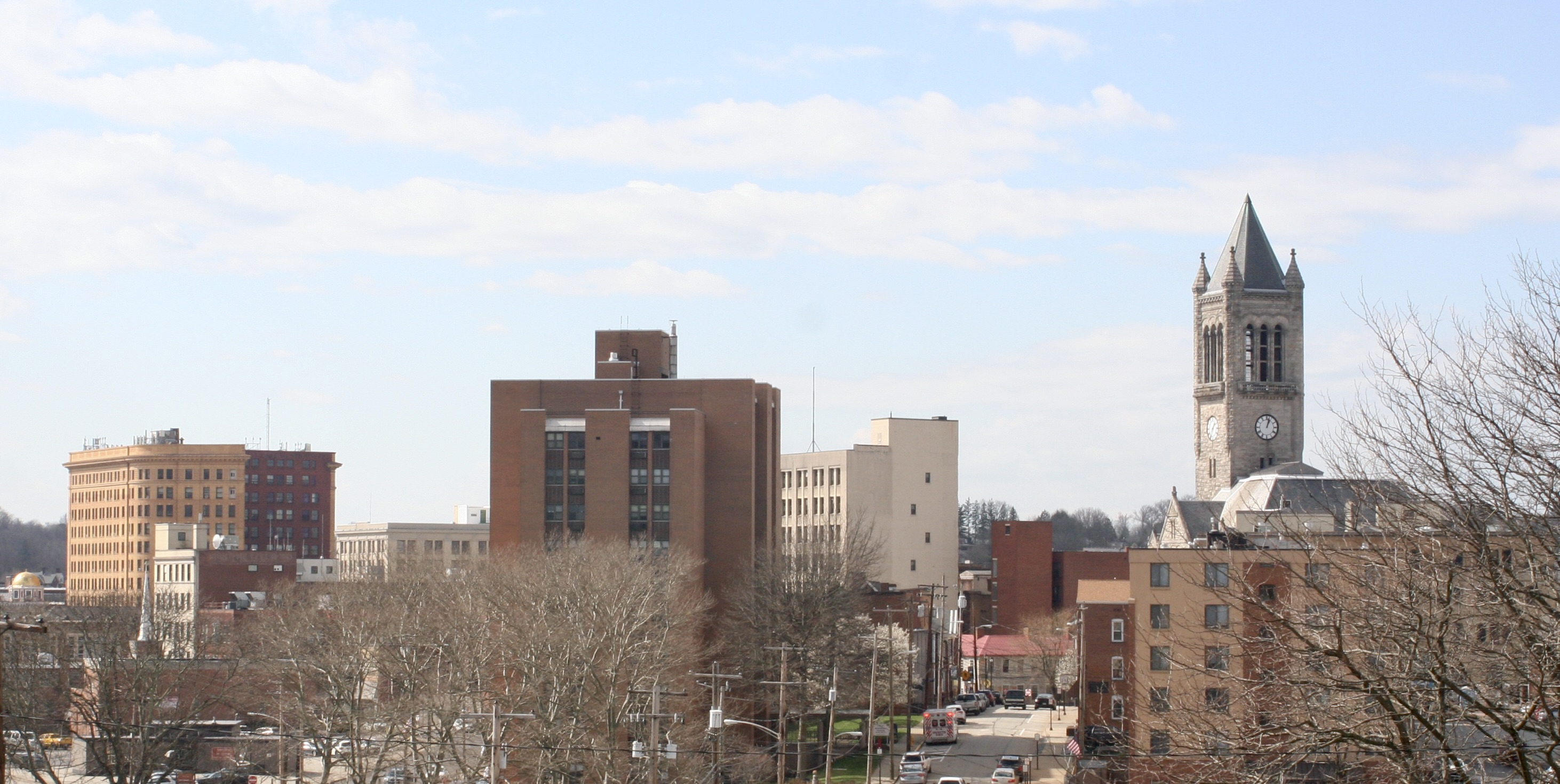
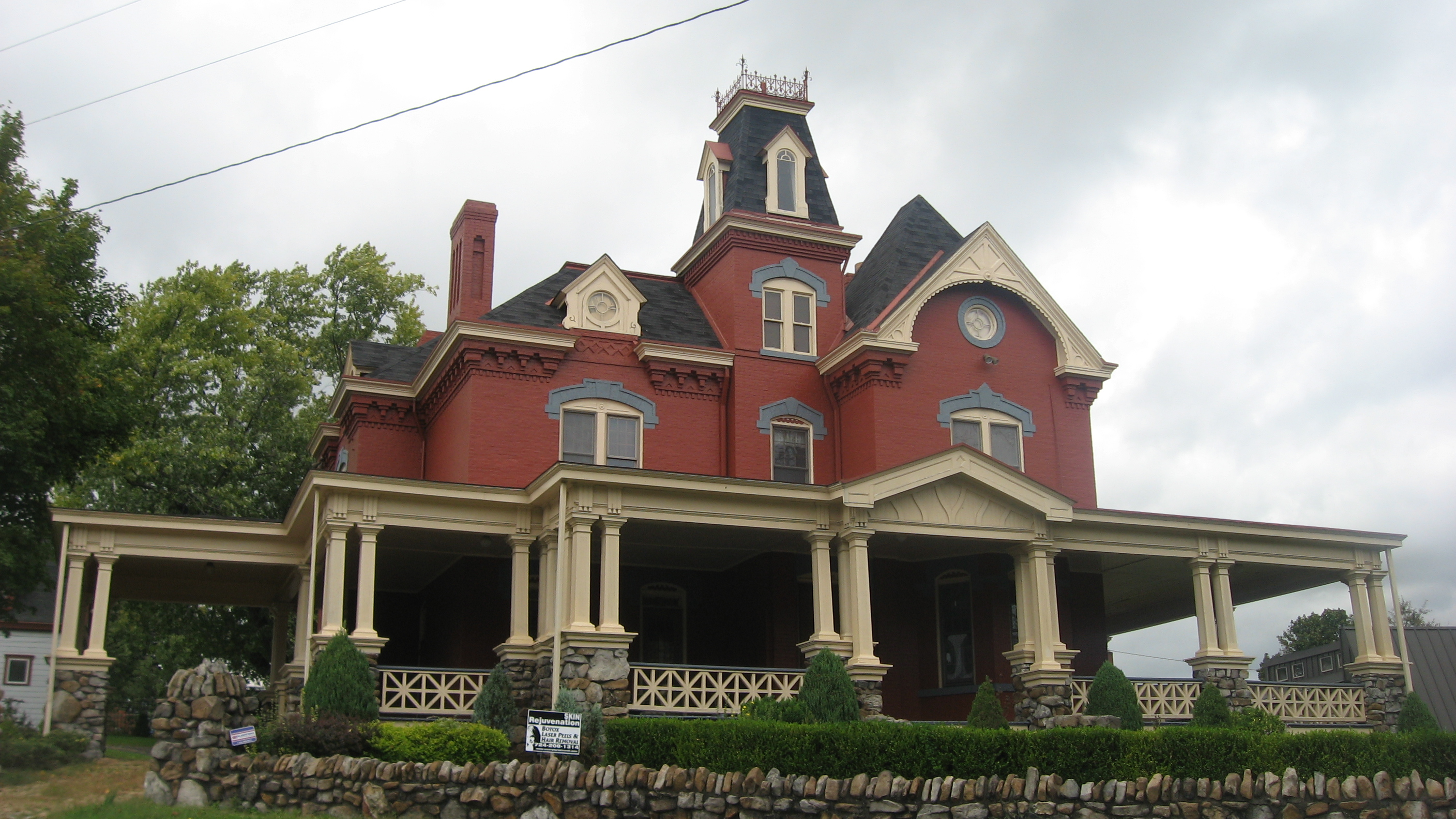
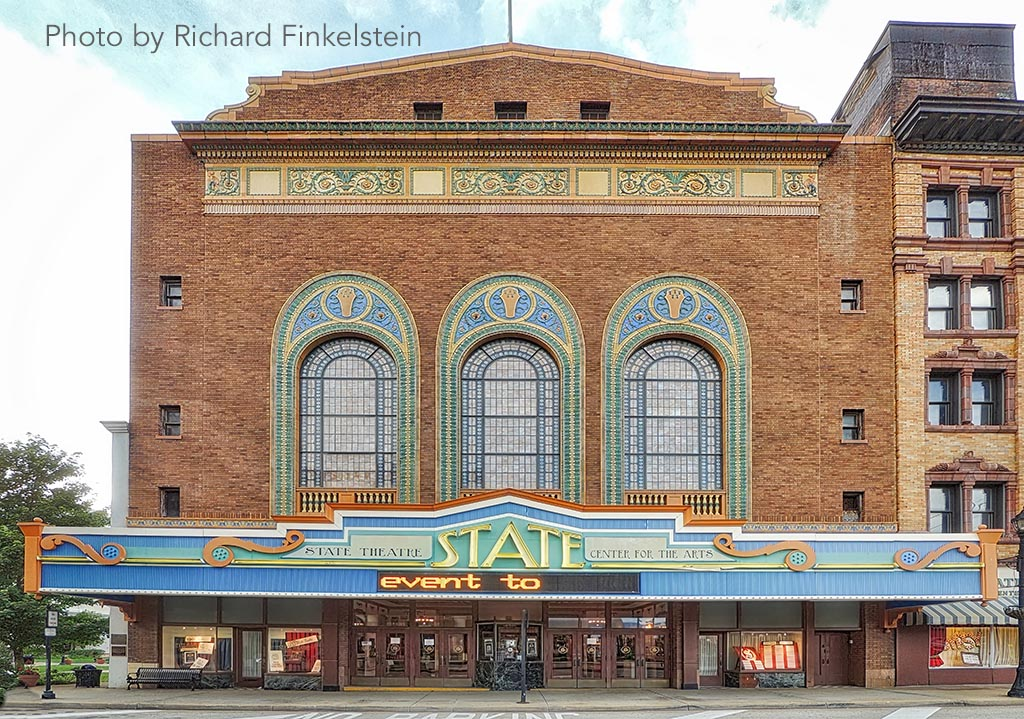
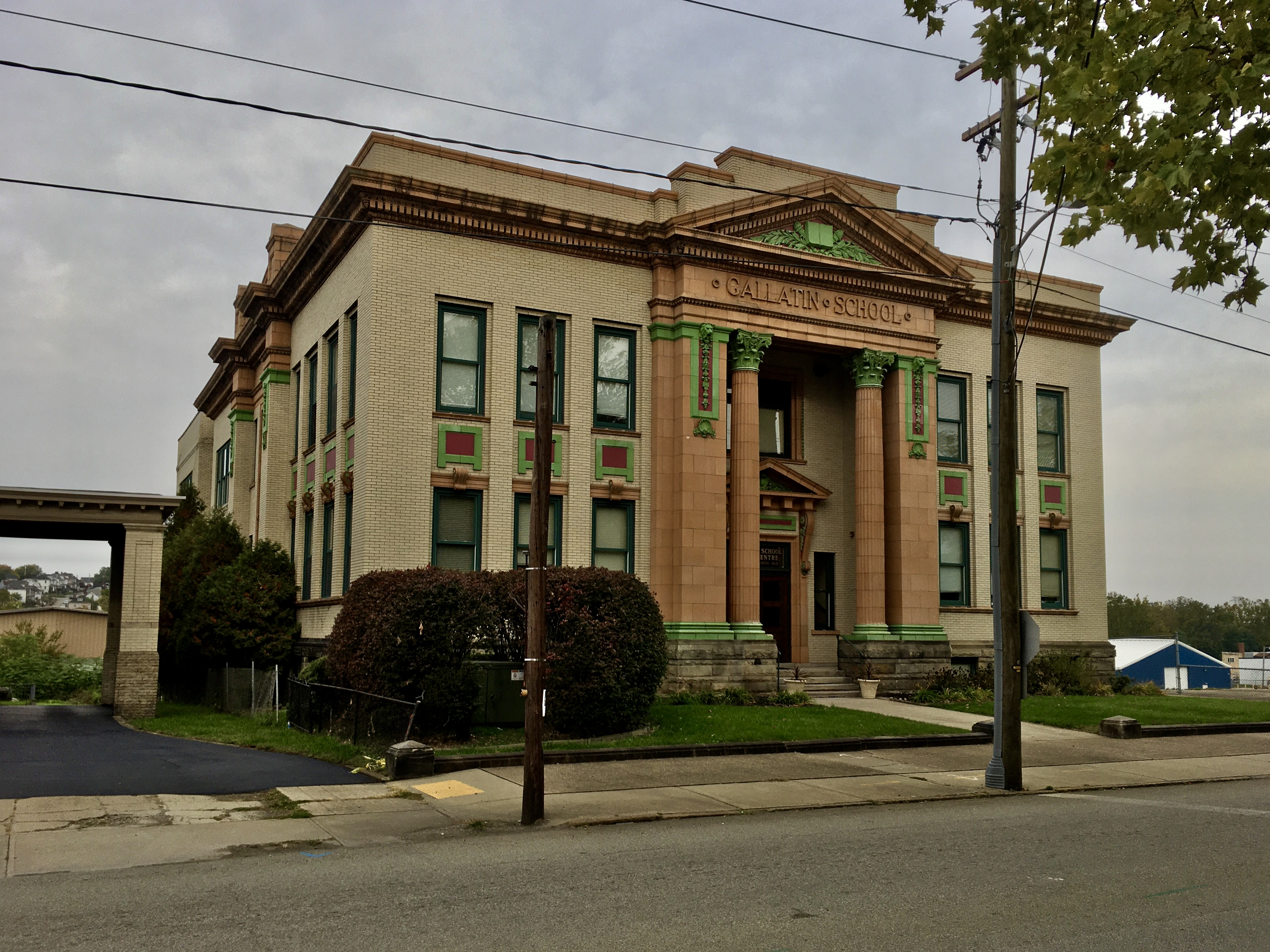
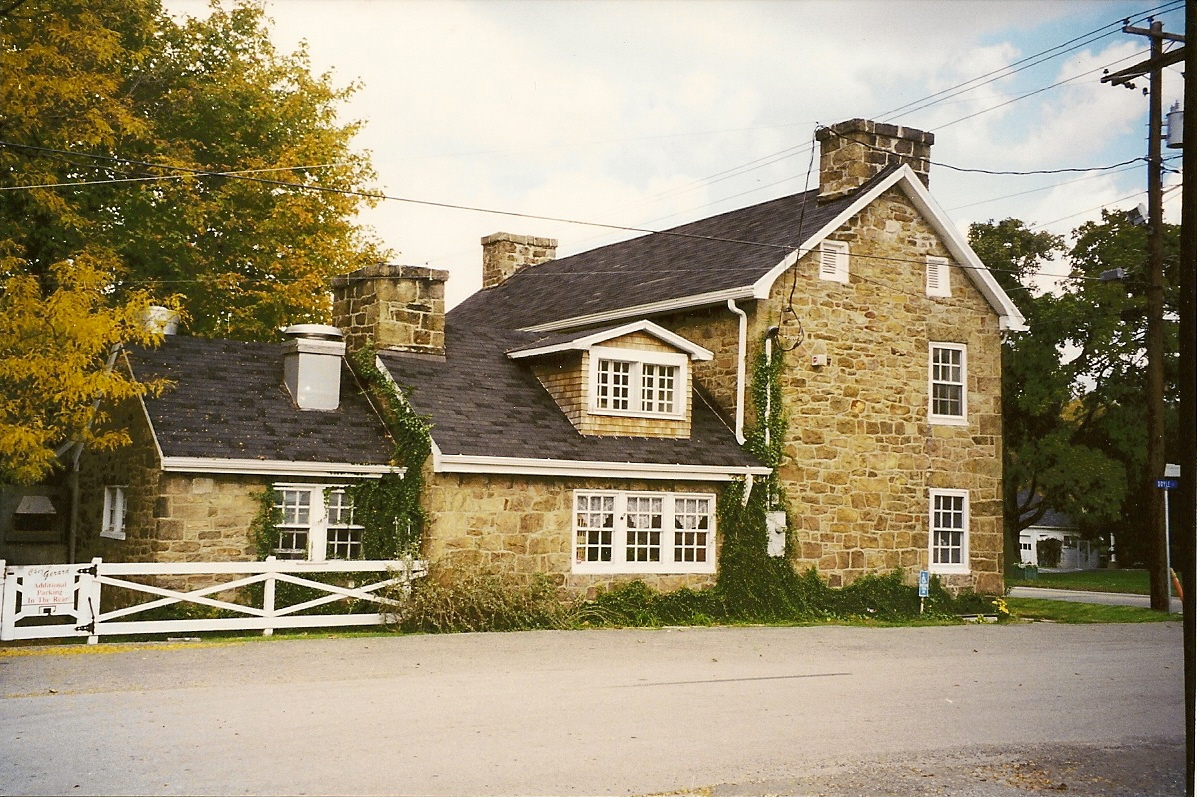
- Downtown Uniontown Nutt Mansion State Theatre Gallatin School Hopwood House

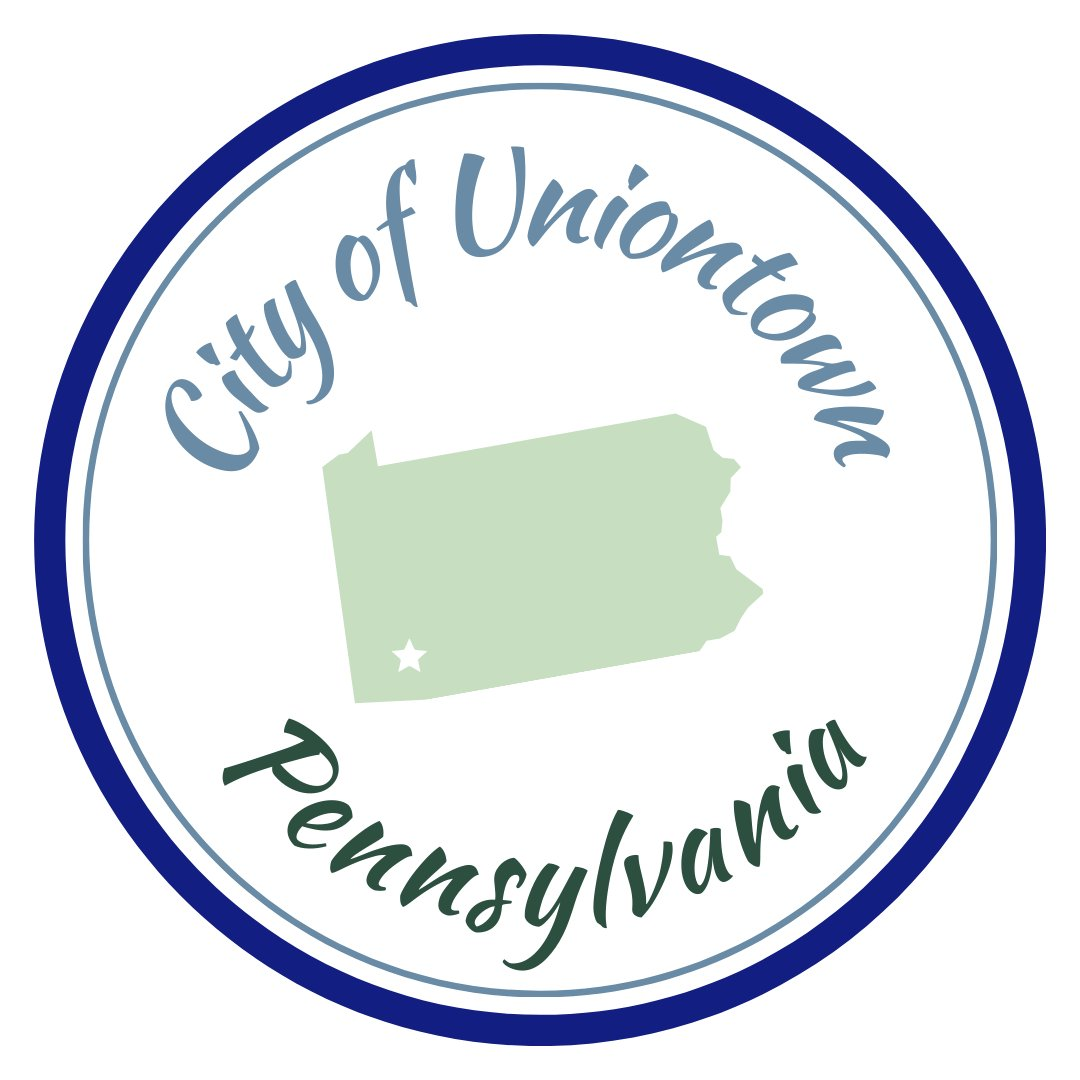
- Logo
- Interactive map of Uniontown, Pennsylvania
- Location within Pennsylvania Location within the United States
- Coordinates: 39°54′0″N 79°43′28″W
- Country: United States
- State: Pennsylvania
- County: Fayette
- Established: July 4, 1776

Government
  - Mayor: Bill Gerke

Area
  - Total: 2.05 sq mi (5.32 km^{2})
  - Land: 2.05 sq mi (5.32 km^{2})
  - Water: 0 sq mi (0.00 km^{2})
- Elevation: 999 ft (304 m)

Population (2020)
  - Total: 9,984
  - Density: 4,732.5/sq mi (1,827.24/km^{2})
- Time zone: UTC−5 (EST)
  - Summer (DST): UTC−4 (EDT)
- ZIP Code: 15401
- Area codes: 724, 878
- FIPS code: 42-78528
- Website: uniontowncity.com

Uniontown is the largest city in Fayette County, Pennsylvania, United States, and its county seat. The population was 9,984 at the 2020 census. It is part of the Pittsburgh metropolitan area, 40 miles (64 km) southeast of Pittsburgh.

== History ==
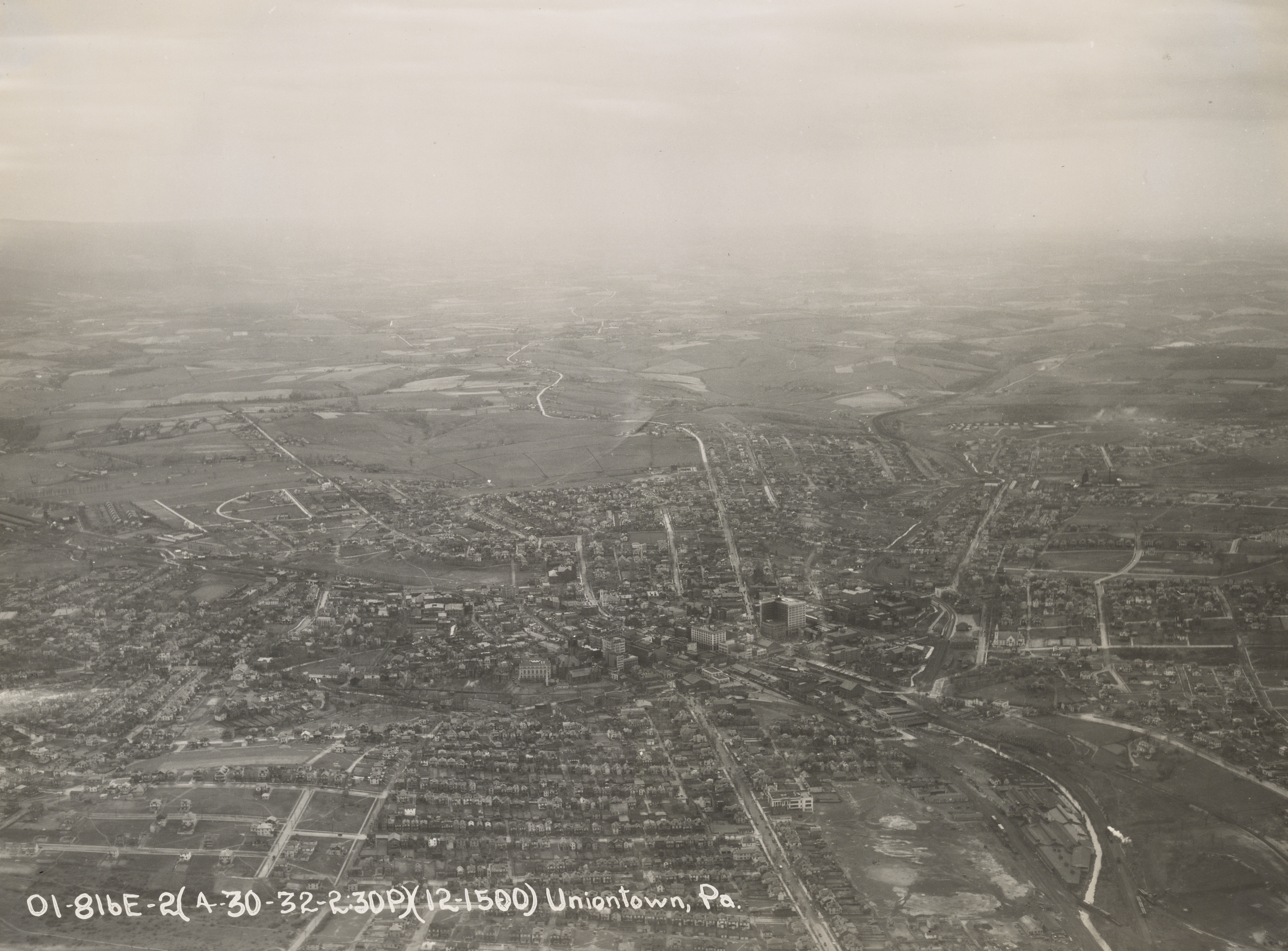
Uniontown in 1932

10 miles (16 km) southeast of Uniontown is Fort Necessity, built by George Washington during the French and Indian War (part of the international Seven Years' War) as well as the site of the Battle of Jumonville Glen, where the North American branch of the war began.

Uniontown lies within the foothills of the Allegheny Mountains at an elevation of 999 feet (304 meters) above sea level. The city rests at the base of Chestnut Ridge, the westernmost ridge of the Appalachian Mountains.

Founded in 1776, Uniontown was known as "the Town of Union" by Henry Beeson, a Quaker born in Virginia in 1743 who had settled in the area in 1768, buying tracts of land and running a sawmill. On July 4 (coincidentally, the same day the United States Declaration of Independence was adopted), Beeson published a plat of quarter-acre plots near his mill to be allocated by lottery on July 20 to purchasers prepared to build houses on them.

In early years, the town was sometimes unofficially called "Beesonstown", though not by Beeson. In 1783, Fayette County was established and divided into townships, of which Union Township contained the namesake town. The town was incorporated as a borough in 1796 under the name Uniontown and separated from Union Township, which was split in 1851 into the North Union and South Union townships.

The National Road, also known as the Cumberland Road, was routed through Uniontown in the early 19th century, and the town grew along with the road (now US 40). Uniontown's role in the Underground Railroad in the antebellum years is commemorated by a marker on the corner of East Main Street and Baker Alley. Residents helped slaves escape from the South to freedom.

In the late nineteenth century, the town grew based on the development of coal mines and the steel industry. Uniontown was the site of violent clashes between striking coal miners and guards at the local coke works during the bituminous coal miners' strike of 1894. Fifteen guards armed with carbines and machine guns held off an attack by 1,500 strikers, killing five and wounding eight.

The Columbia Rolling Mill, an iron and steel works, was located in Uniontown from 1887 to 1895. The mill was the town's top industry at that time. During the Coal Boom of the early part of the 20th century, Uniontown was home to at least 13 millionaires, the most (per capita) of any city in the United States. "Coal barons" and Carl Laemmle, the president of Universal Films, sponsored the famous Uniontown Speedway board track from 1916 to 1922. It was a mile-and-a-quarter raceway.

As with most of Western Pennsylvania, Uniontown's economy waned during the region's deindustrialization in the late 20th century, when the steel industry restructured and many jobs went elsewhere, including offshore. This decline continued into the 21st century, and the population is about half its 1940 peak.

The only United States Navy ship named for the city was USS Uniontown, a Tacoma-class frigate renamed from Chattanooga on August 16, 1944.

In 1967, Uniontown was the birthplace of the McDonald's Big Mac sandwich. In 2007, the Big Mac Museum was opened in North Huntingdon Township in Westmoreland County, to the disappointment of some Uniontown residents. According to a McDonald's spokesperson, the decision was based on logistics and access, but Uniontown residents complained in an article that was published in The Herald-Standard.

The Uniontown Downtown Historic District, Gallatin School, John S. Douglas House, John P. Conn House, and Adam Clarke Nutt Mansion are listed on the National Register of Historic Places.

== Geography ==
Uniontown is located slightly west of the center of Fayette County at 39°54'0" North, 79°43'28" West (39.900040, −79.724478). It is located 12 miles (19 km) north of the West Virginia state line.

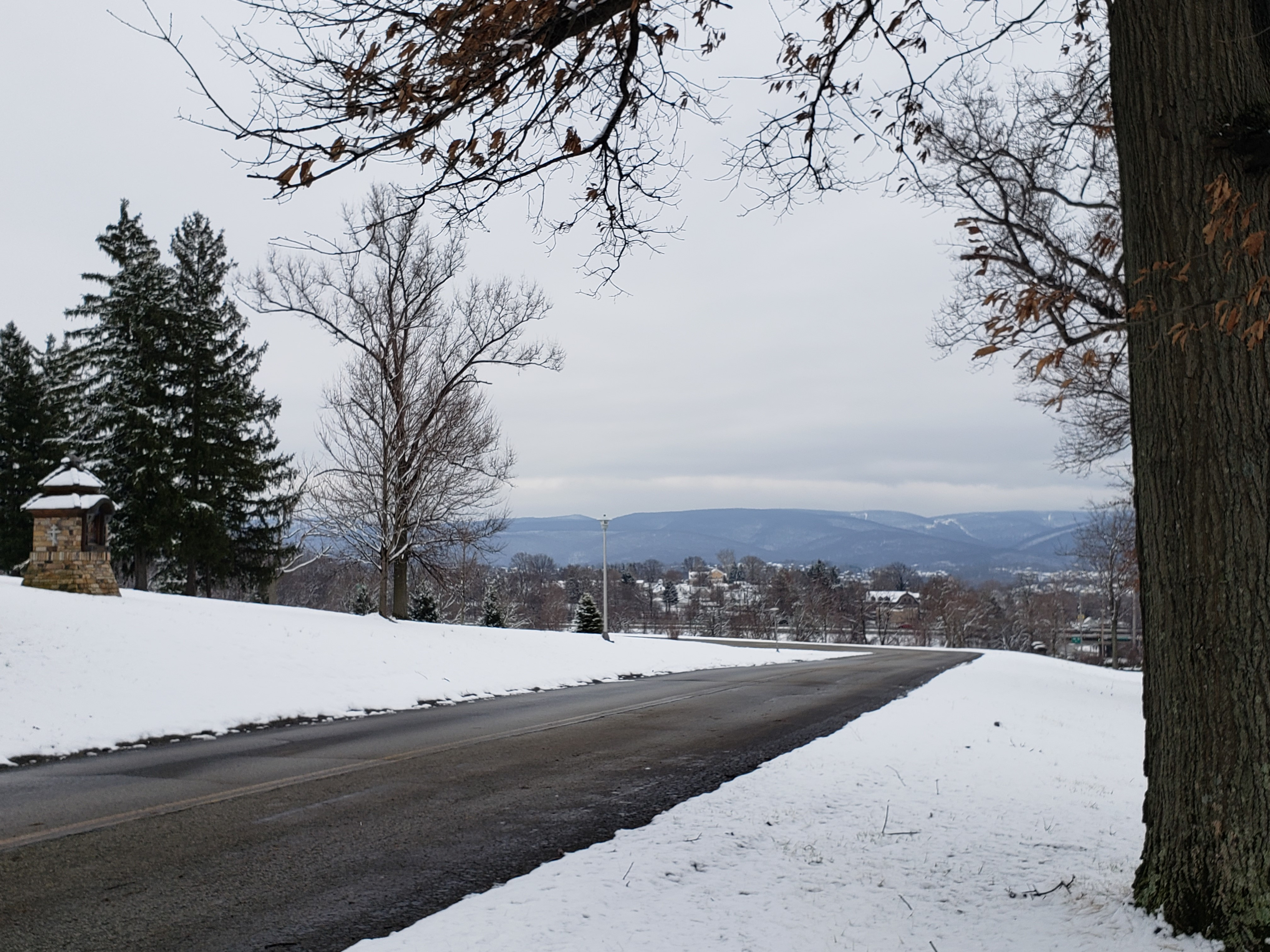
Looking East into Uniontown, with Chestnut Ridge in the distance and snow on the ground

According to the United States Census Bureau, the city has a total area of 2.04 square miles (5.29 km^{2}), all land. The city is 999 feet (304 m) above sea level and rests at the base of Chestnut Ridge, the westernmost ridge of the Appalachian Mountains to the east. The National Pike or Cumberland Road crossed the mountains and passed through the area that became the center of Uniontown. The route is now Business Route 40, as the main line of US 40 bypasses the city center to the south and west as a freeway loop called the George Marshall Parkway.

=== Climate ===
Uniontown is located in a humid continental climate (Köppen Dfa/Dfb) with cold and snowy (sometimes bitter cold) to mild winters, owing to its location near Chestnut Ridge, with average daytime temperatures running in the 30s to 40s °F (0–10 °C) and warm to hot and humid summers with average daytime temperatures running in the 70s to 80s °F (20–30 °C).

Climate data for Uniontown, Pennsylvania (1991–2020; extremes 1974–present
Month	Jan	Feb	Mar	Apr	May	Jun	Jul	Aug	Sep	Oct	Nov	Dec	Year
Record high °F (°C)	79 (26)	77 (25)	88 (31)	93 (34)	93 (34)	97 (36)	102 (39)	102 (39)	99 (37)	95 (35)	88 (31)	77 (25)	102 (39)
Mean daily maximum °F (°C)	39 (4)	42 (6)	51 (11)	63 (17)	72 (22)	80 (27)	84 (29)	83 (28)	76 (24)	65 (18)	54 (12)	42 (6)	63 (17)
Daily mean °F (°C)	31 (−1)	33 (1)	42 (6)	53 (12)	62 (17)	70 (21)	73 (23)	72 (22)	65 (18)	54 (12)	45 (7)	35 (2)	53 (12)
Mean daily minimum °F (°C)	20 (−7)	22 (−6)	28 (−2)	37 (3)	46 (8)	56 (13)	60 (16)	59 (15)	51 (11)	40 (4)	32 (0)	24 (−4)	40 (4)
Record low °F (°C)	−22 (−30)	−16 (−27)	−3 (−19)	15 (−9)	23 (−5)	33 (1)	37 (3)	34 (1)	29 (−2)	16 (−9)	−1 (−18)	−14 (−26)	−22 (−30)
Average precipitation inches (mm)	3.10 (79)	2.79 (71)	3.67 (93)	3.68 (93)	4.46 (113)	4.26 (108)	4.57 (116)	3.52 (89)	3.35 (85)	2.98 (76)	3.66 (93)	3.07 (78)	43.11 (1,094)
Average snowfall inches (cm)	8.4 (21)	7.2 (18)	4.6 (12)	0.4 (1.0)	0.0 (0.0)	0.0 (0.0)	0.0 (0.0)	0.0 (0.0)	0.0 (0.0)	0.0 (0.0)	0.9 (2.3)	4.4 (11)	25.9 (65.3)
Source: NWS Pittsburgh - NOWData / XMACIS

== Government ==
Uniontown's government is composed of a mayor and a five-member city council. The current mayor is Bill Gerke.

Uniontown is in Pennsylvania's 14th congressional district and is currently represented in the United States House of Representatives by Republican Guy Reschenthaler and in the United States Senate by Democrat John Fetterman and Republican Dave McCormick.

== Demographics ==
Historical population
Census	Pop.	Note	%±
1800	624		—
1810	999		60.1%
1820	1,058		5.9%
1840	1,710		—
1850	2,333		36.4%
1870	2,503		—
1880	3,265		30.4%
1890	6,359		94.8%
1900	7,344		15.5%
1910	13,344		81.7%
1920	15,692		17.6%
1930	19,544		24.5%
1940	21,819		11.6%
1950	20,471		−6.2%
1960	17,942		−12.4%
1970	16,282		−9.3%
1980	14,510		−10.9%
1990	12,034		−17.1%
2000	12,422		3.2%
2010	10,372		−16.5%
2020	9,984		−3.7%

=== 2020 census ===
As of the 2020 census, Uniontown had a population of 9,984. The median age was 41.3 years. 20.7% of residents were under 18, and 19.7% were 65 years of age or older. For every 100 females there were 90.1 males, and for every 100 females age 18 and over there were 87.6 males age 18 and over.

100.0% of residents lived in urban areas, while 0.0% lived in rural areas.

There were 4,565 households in Uniontown, of which 23.1% had children under 18 living in them. Of all households, 26.4% were married-couple households, 24.5% were households with a male householder and no spouse or partner present, and 41.3% were households with a female householder and no spouse or partner present. About 43.8% of all households were made up of individuals and 19.0% had someone living alone who was 65 years of age or older.

There were 5,226 housing units, of which 12.6% were vacant. The homeowner vacancy rate was 3.3% and the rental vacancy rate was 9.9%.

Racial composition as of the 2020 census
Race	Number	Percent
White	7,136	71.5%
Black or African American	1,855	18.6%
American Indian and Alaska Native	28	0.3%
Asian	64	0.6%
Native Hawaiian and Other Pacific Islander	67	0.7%
Some other race	125	1.3%
Two or more races	709	7.1%
Hispanic or Latino (of any race)	252	2.5%

=== 2010 census ===
As of the 2010 census, there were 10,372 people, 5,423 households, and 3,031 families residing in the city. The population density was 5,136 inhabitants per square mile (1,983/km^{2}). There were 6,320 housing units at an average density of 3,103.0 per square mile (1,198.1/km^{2}). The racial makeup of the city was 75.16% White, 18.90% African American, 0.36% Native American, 0.93% Asian, 0.03% Pacific Islander, 0.30% from other races, and 3.67% from two or more races. Hispanic or Latino of any race were 1.59% of the population.

The largest white ethnic groups in Uniontown: 15.4% German, 13.4% Irish, 9% Italian, 6% Dutch, 5.6% English, 5.5% Polish.

There were 5,423 households, out of which 23.7% had children under the age of 18.2 living with them, 35.8% were married couples living together, 16.0% had a female householder with no husband present, and 44.1% were non-families. 39.7% of all households were made up of individuals, and 19.5% had someone living alone who was 75 years of age or older. The average household size was 2.27 and the average family size was 2.791.

In the city, the population was spread out, with 20.9% under 18, 8.6% from 18 to 24, 26.1% from 25 to 44, 22.4% from 45 to 64, and 22.0% who were 65 or older. The median age was 39 years. For every 100 females, there were 86.2 males. For every 100 females age 18 and over, there were 81.5 males.

In 2012, the median household income in the city was $31,760, and the median family income was $37,841. The per capita income for the city was $22,457.

== Education ==
Uniontown is part of the Uniontown Area School District, which includes Lafayette Elementary School (grades K–5), Menallen Elementary School (grades K–6), Ben Franklin Elementary/Middle School (grades K–8), Layafette Middle School (grades 6–8), and Uniontown Area High School (grades 9–12) within the city. Students are also served by the Fayette County Career and Technical Institute for education in the trades. Laurel Highlands School District serves outlying areas immediately surrounding the city. Private schools include St. John the Evangelist Regional Catholic School and Chestnut Ridge Christian Academy.

Higher education in Uniontown includes the Westmoreland County Community College, Uniontown Education Center, Penn State Fayette, Laurel Business Institute, and United Career Institute. The city was formerly home to Madison College, operated by the Methodist Episcopal Church, from 1827 to 1857.

== Services ==
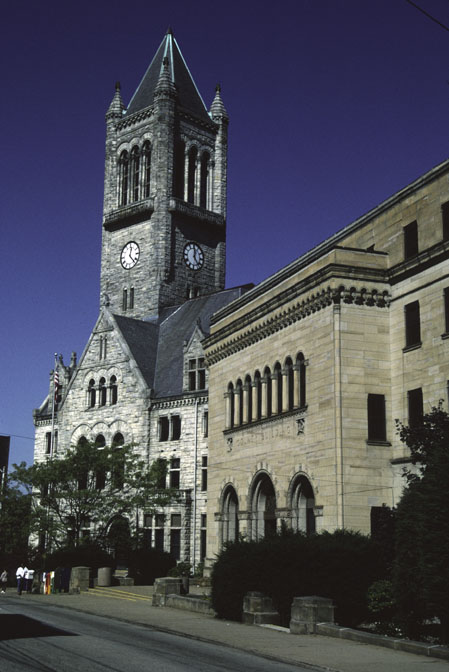
Fayette County Courthouse

Uniontown Hospital, the larger of two hospitals in the county, is the city's and Fayette County's largest employer.

The City of Uniontown operates a full-time police department. The city police station houses a booking center used by all police agencies within Fayette County, including the Pennsylvania State Police.

The City of Uniontown Bureau of Fire is a combination career/volunteer department operating out of three stations (two staffed and one reserve). It provides services including fire suppression, fire prevention, various aspects of rescue operations, pre-fire and disaster planning, fire safety consultation services, disaster response along with city Emergency Management personnel, and a number of other public services. EMS service is provided by Fayette EMS, which replaced the former Uniontown Fireman's Ambulance in July 2013.

The bureau has four engines (pumping apparatus), two trucks (aerial apparatus), a heavy rescue unit, a squad truck, and a command S.U.V.

Station 1, or Central Station, is located downtown on North Beeson Boulevard at Penn Street. Central Station houses Engine #1, Engine #4, Truck #1, Rescue, Squad, Command Unit, and provides housing for two Fayette EMS units as well. Station 2, or the East End Station, is located on Connellsville Street near Lincoln Street. The East End Station houses Engine #3 and Truck "A". The 3rd station, the Union Hose Building, located on East Main Street near Grant Street, houses the city's Emergency Management Agency and Emergency Operations Center, and provides housing for the fire bureau's reserve pumper, Engine #5.

The department has three accredited PA Fire Academy Local Level Instructors and a number of professional qualifications board testing evaluators.

== Media ==
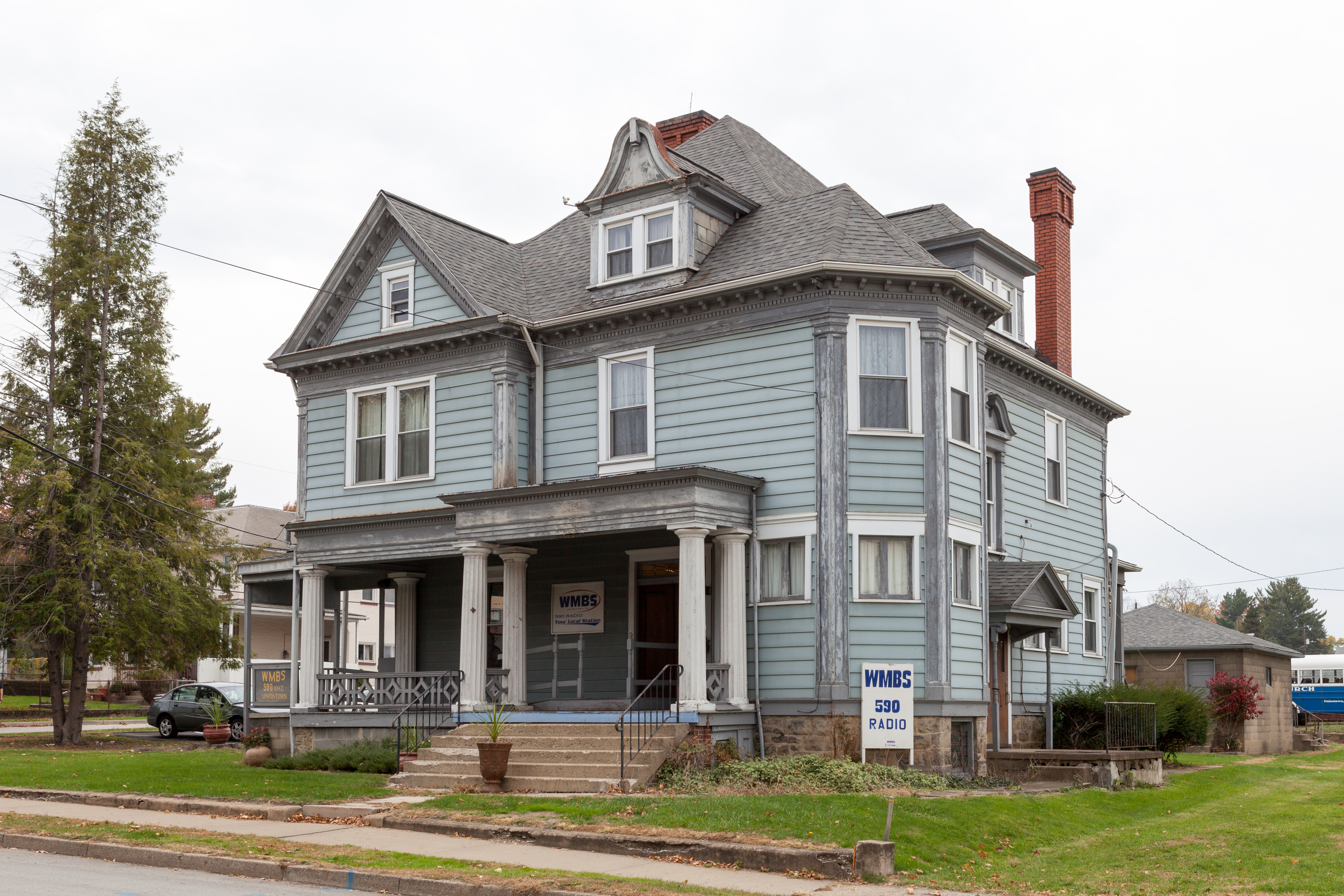
WMBS (AM) studio on South Mount Vernon Avenue

- The Herald-Standard, a newspaper based in Uniontown, serves the city and much of the surrounding area.
- Fayette TV provides local programming on Breezeline Cable channel 77.
- Two radio stations are licensed to the Uniontown area on 590 AM, 101.1FM WMBS and 99.3 FM WPKL.

== Transportation ==
Uniontown is an important crossroads in Fayette County. The main route around town is a stretch of freeway bypass, the George Marshall Parkway, which is composed of parts of US 40 and US 119. US 119 enters the area as a two-lane route from Morgantown, West Virginia, and provides the northern half of the bypass before becoming a four-lane route to Connellsville. US 40 enters the region as a two-lane route from Brownsville. It serves as the southern half of the freeway before becoming a mountainous route through rural parts of the county, entering Maryland and reaching Interstate 68. The old portion of US 40, now signed as Business 40, serves the downtown area.

PA 51, a main four-lane route to Pittsburgh, and PA 21, which connects Fayette County with Greene County and Waynesburg, both terminate in Uniontown. PA 43, part of the Mon–Fayette Expressway project to connect Pittsburgh with Morgantown, West Virginia, is complete around the Uniontown area.

Local bus service is provided by Fayette Area Coordinated Transportation.

== Notable people ==
- Professional wrestler Bruiser Brody (1946–1988), known as Frank Donald Goodish outside the ring.
- Henry Bidleman Bascom (1796–1850), religious circuit rider, U.S. congressional chaplain, Methodist bishop, first president of Madison College
- Henry White Beeson (1791–1863), former member of the U.S. House of Representatives
- John Dickson Carr (1906–1977), mystery writer born in Uniontown
- Robert J. Cenker, engineer and RCA astronaut born in Uniontown
- William E. Crow (1870–1922), former United States Senator
- Teresa Abi-Nader Dahlberg (born 1961), academic administrator and engineering professor
- Ernie Davis (1939–1963), first African-American Heisman Trophy winner, lived in Uniontown for most of his early life
- John Littleton Dawson (1813–1870), former member of the U.S. House of Representatives
- Jim Delligatti (1918–2016), inventor of the Big Mac, born in Uniontown
- Tory Epps (1976–2005), former NFL defensive lineman
- Mark Esper (born 1964), 27th United States Secretary of Defense under President Donald Trump, born in Uniontown
- George Bird Evans (1906–1998), noted illustrator, mystery novelist, gunning and bird dog writer, and dog breeder
- Ronne Froman (RADM, USN, Ret.; born 1947), born in Uniontown
- Gus Gerard (born 1953), former ABA and NBA player
- Thomas Irwin (1785–1870), former member of the U.S. House of Representatives and former U.S. district court judge
- William James (born 1979), former NFL cornerback born and raised in Uniontown
- Stu Lantz (born 1946), former NBA player and color commentator for the Los Angeles Lakers, played basketball for Uniontown High School and led them to a PIAA state championship in 1964
- James Lawson (born 1928), civil rights leader born in Uniontown
- George C. Marshall (1880–1959), American military leader, General of the Army, Secretary of State, and the third Secretary of Defense, born in Uniontown
- Terry Mulholland (born 1963), former Major League baseball player, born and raised in Uniontown
- Chuck Muncie (1953–2013), former NFL star running back for the New Orleans Saints and San Diego Chargers, originally from Uniontown
- Nelson Munsey (1948–2009), former NFL cornerback for the Baltimore Colts and Minnesota Vikings, originally from Uniontown
- David Nehls (born 1964), actor, singer, composer and lyricist
- Larry Pennell (1928–2013), film and television actor, born in Uniontown in 1928
- Kaleb Ramsey (born 1989), former NFL player
- Wil Robinson (born 1949), former NBA/ABA player, also a West Virginia University all-time great
- Sandy Stephens (1940–2000), first African-American quarterback for the University of Minnesota Golden Gophers, born in Uniontown
- Andrew Stewart (1791–1872), former member of the U.S. House of Representatives
- Daniel Sturgeon (1789–1878), former United States Senator
- Tom Wilson (1931–2011), cartoonist, noted for the comic strip Ziggy.
- Gene Steratore (born 1963), former NFL football and NCAA basketball referee and currently a rules analyst for CBS Sports
- Gene Huey (born 1947), former AFL football player and long-serving college and professional coach
- Thomas Ford (1800-1850), former 8th Governor of Illinois, born near Uniontown before being raised in Monroe County, Illinois.

== See also ==
- National Register of Historic Places listings in Fayette County, Pennsylvania

== Sources ==
- Hadden, James (1913). A history of Uniontown : the county seat of Fayette County, Pennsylvania. Akron, Ohio: New Werner.
