= Georges Township, Pennsylvania =

Township in Pennsylvania, United States

Coordinates: 39°48′00″N 79°43′59″W

Georges Township
- Township
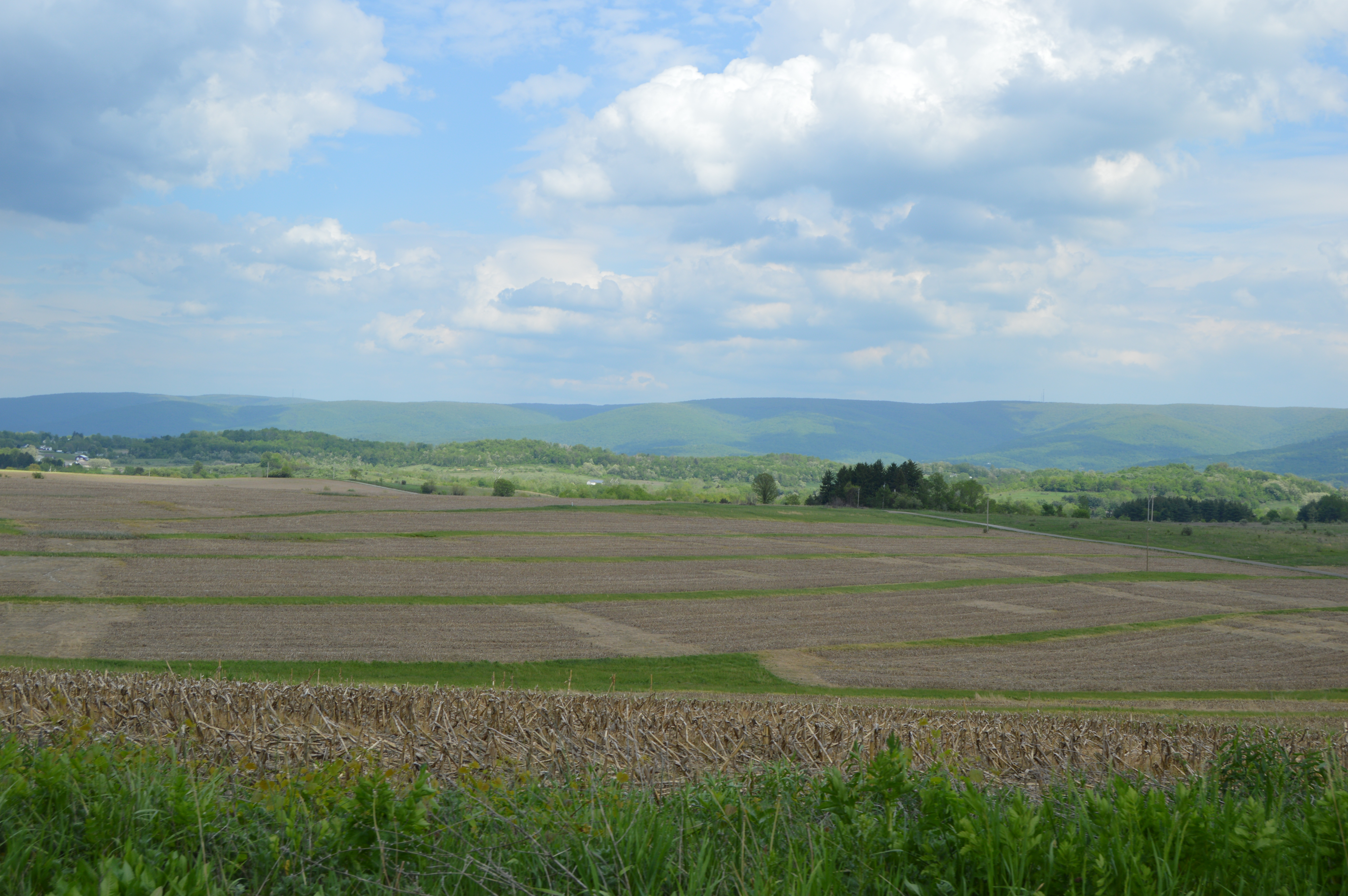
- Countryside just east of Shoaf

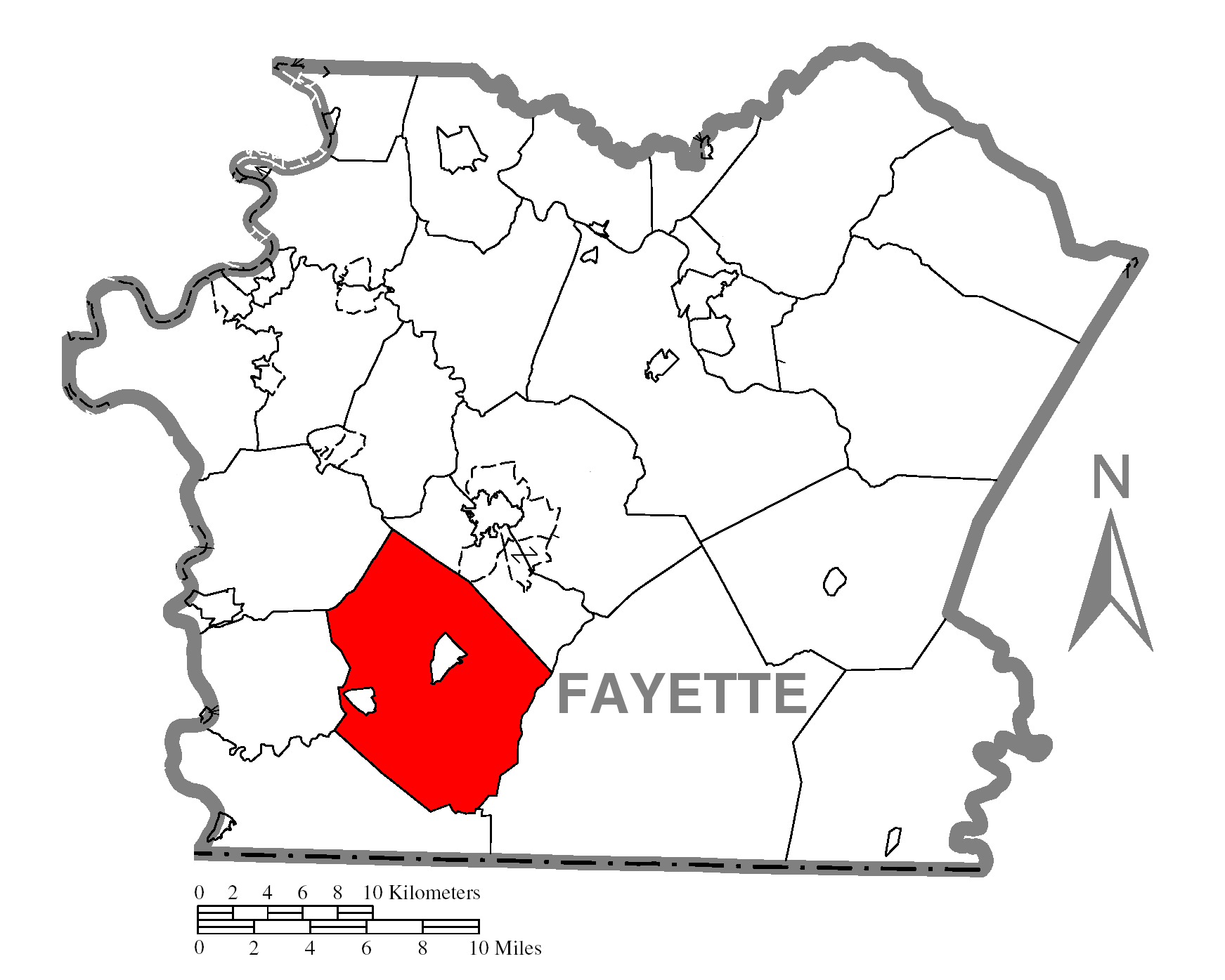
- Location of Georges Township in Fayette County

- Location of Fayette County in Pennsylvania
- Country: United States
- State: Pennsylvania
- County: Fayette

Area
  - Total: 47.63 sq mi (123.35 km^{2})
  - Land: 47.61 sq mi (123.32 km^{2})
  - Water: 0.012 sq mi (0.03 km^{2})

Population (2020)
  - Total: 6,346 ▼
  - Estimate (2022): 6,202
  - Density: 134.5/sq mi (51.93/km^{2})
- Time zone: UTC-4 (EST)
  - Summer (DST): UTC-5 (EDT)
- Area code: 724
- FIPS code: 42-051-28792
- Website: https://www.georgestownship.com/

Georges Township is a township in Fayette County, Pennsylvania, United States. The population was 6,346 at the 2020 census, a decline from the figure of 6,612 tabulated in 2010. It is served by the Albert Gallatin Area School District.

Collier, Newcomer, Oliphant Furnace, Haydentown, Ruble Mill, York Run, Shoaf, Amend, and Highhouse are villages within the township.

== History ==
The Shoaf Historic District was listed on the National Register of Historic Places in 1994.

== Geography ==
Georges Township is in southwestern Fayette County. It surrounds the boroughs of Fairchance (near the center of the township) and Smithfield (in the southwest). Pennsylvania Route 43 (the Mon–Fayette Expressway), U.S. Route 119, and Pennsylvania Route 857 cross the township, running roughly parallel. All lead northeast to Uniontown, the county seat. US 119 leads southwest to Point Marion and Morgantown, West Virginia, while the Mon–Fayette Expressway provides a quicker route to Morgantown via Interstate 68 in West Virginia. The eastern boundary of Georges Township runs close to the crest of Chestnut Ridge, reaching a peak elevation of 2,760 feet (840 m). The lowest elevation in the township is 930 feet (280 m) along Georges Creek where it exits the township south of Smithfield.

According to the United States Census Bureau, the township has a total area of 47.63 square miles (123.35 km²), of which 47.61 square miles (123.32 km²) is land and 0.01 square miles (0.03 km²), or 0.03%, is water.

== Demographics ==
Historical population
Census	Pop.	Note	%±
2010	6,612		—
2020	6,346		−4.0%
2022 (est.)	6,202		−2.3%
U.S. Decennial Census

As of the 2000 census, there were 6,752 people, 2,588 households, and 1,925 families residing in the township. The population density was 140.9 inhabitants per square mile (54.4/km²). There were 2,749 housing units at an average density of 57.4 per square mile (22.2/km²). The racial makeup of the township was 97.94% White, 1.01% African American, 0.15% Native American, 0.04% Asian, 0.03% from other races, and 0.83% from two or more races. Hispanics or Latinos of any race were 0.28% of the population.

There were 2,588 households, out of which 31.0% had children under the age of 18 living with them, 57.6% were married couples living together, 11.7% had a female householder with no husband present, and 25.6% were non-families. 22.1% of all households were made up of individuals, and 10.9% had someone living alone who was 65 years of age or older. The average household size was 2.60, and the average family size was 3.02.

In the township the population was spread out, with 23.0% under the age of 18, 8.7% from 18 to 24, 29.6% from 25 to 44, 24.2% from 45 to 64, and 14.5% who were 65 years of age or older. The median age was 38 years. For every 100 females there were 95.9 males. For every 100 females age 18 and over, there were 92.0 males.

The median income for a household in the township was $26,647, and the median income for a family was $31,964. Males had a median income of $27,217 versus $18,805 for females. The per capita income for the township was $14,482. About 16.3% of families and 18.1% of the population were below the poverty line, including 25.0% of those under age 18 and 16.1% of those age 65 or over.

== See also ==
- Tent Presbyterian Church
