= Pennsylvania Route 21 =

State highway in Pennsylvania, US

Pennsylvania Route 21

Route information
- Maintained by PennDOT
- Length: 50.751 mi (81.676 km)
- Existed: 1927–present

Major junctions
- West end: WV 891 in Richhill Township
- US 19 in Waynesburg; I-79 in Morrisville; PA 166 in Masontown; US 40 / US 119 / PA 43 in Uniontown
- East end: US 40 Bus. in Uniontown

Location
- Country: United States
- State: Pennsylvania
- Counties: Greene, Fayette

Highway system
- Pennsylvania State Route System; Interstate; US; State; Scenic; Legislative
← US 20	→ US 22

Pennsylvania Route 21 (PA 21) is a 50.75-mile (81.67 km) long east–west state highway in the US state of Pennsylvania. The western terminus of the route is at the West Virginia state line in Richhill Township, where PA 21 continues into West Virginia as West Virginia Route 891. The eastern terminus is at U.S. Route 40 Business in Uniontown. The route is known as the Roy E. Furman Highway for most of its length. PA 21 serves Waynesburg and Masontown along the way.

PA 21 was originally designated in 1927 between the West Virginia border and Uniontown, originally following an alignment further to the north between Carmichaels and Uniontown via New Salem. By 1950, the route was moved to its current alignment east of Carmichaels, with bypasses of Carmichaels and Masontown constructed by 1960.

== Route description ==
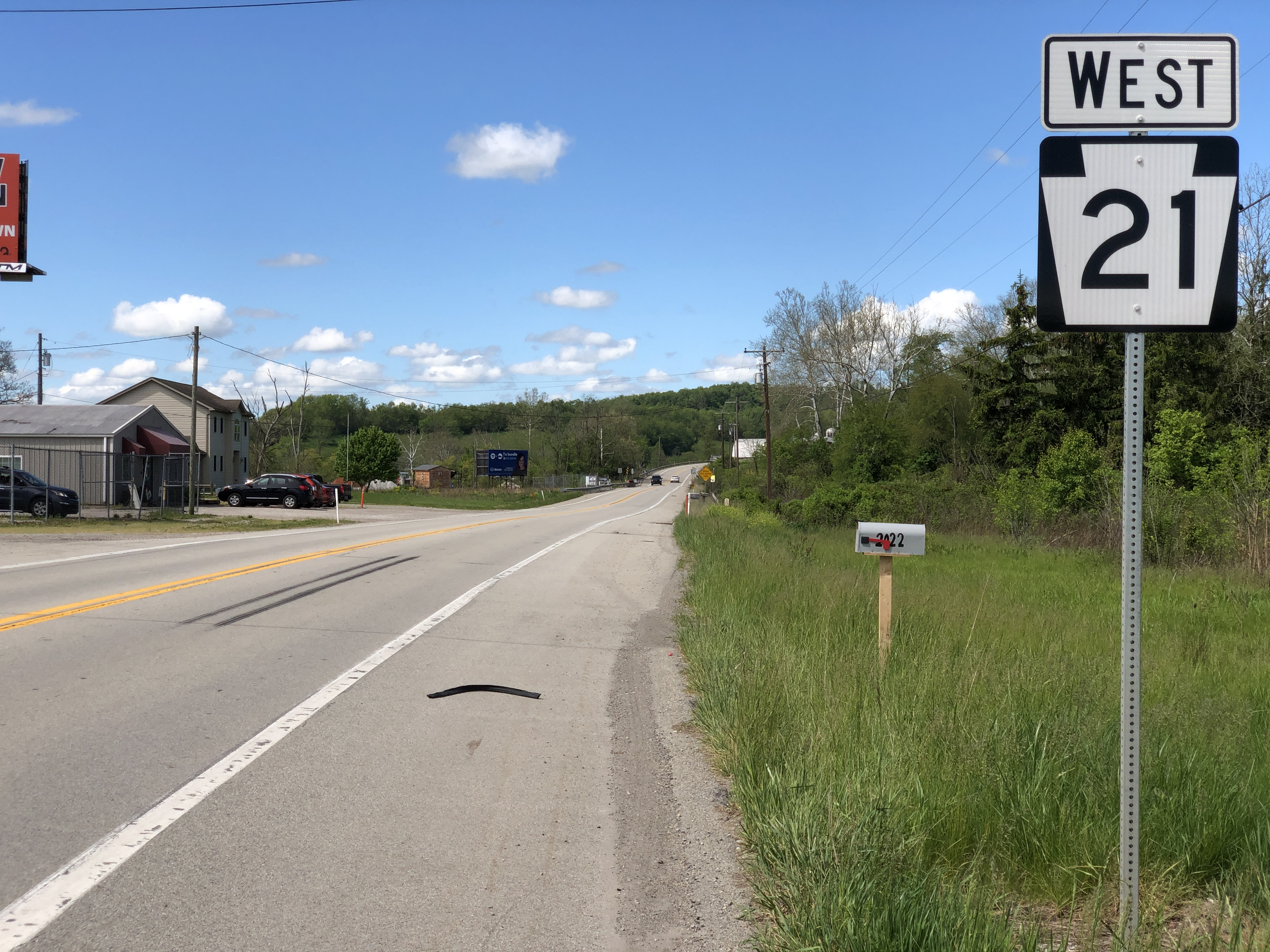
PA 21 westbound in Cumberland Township

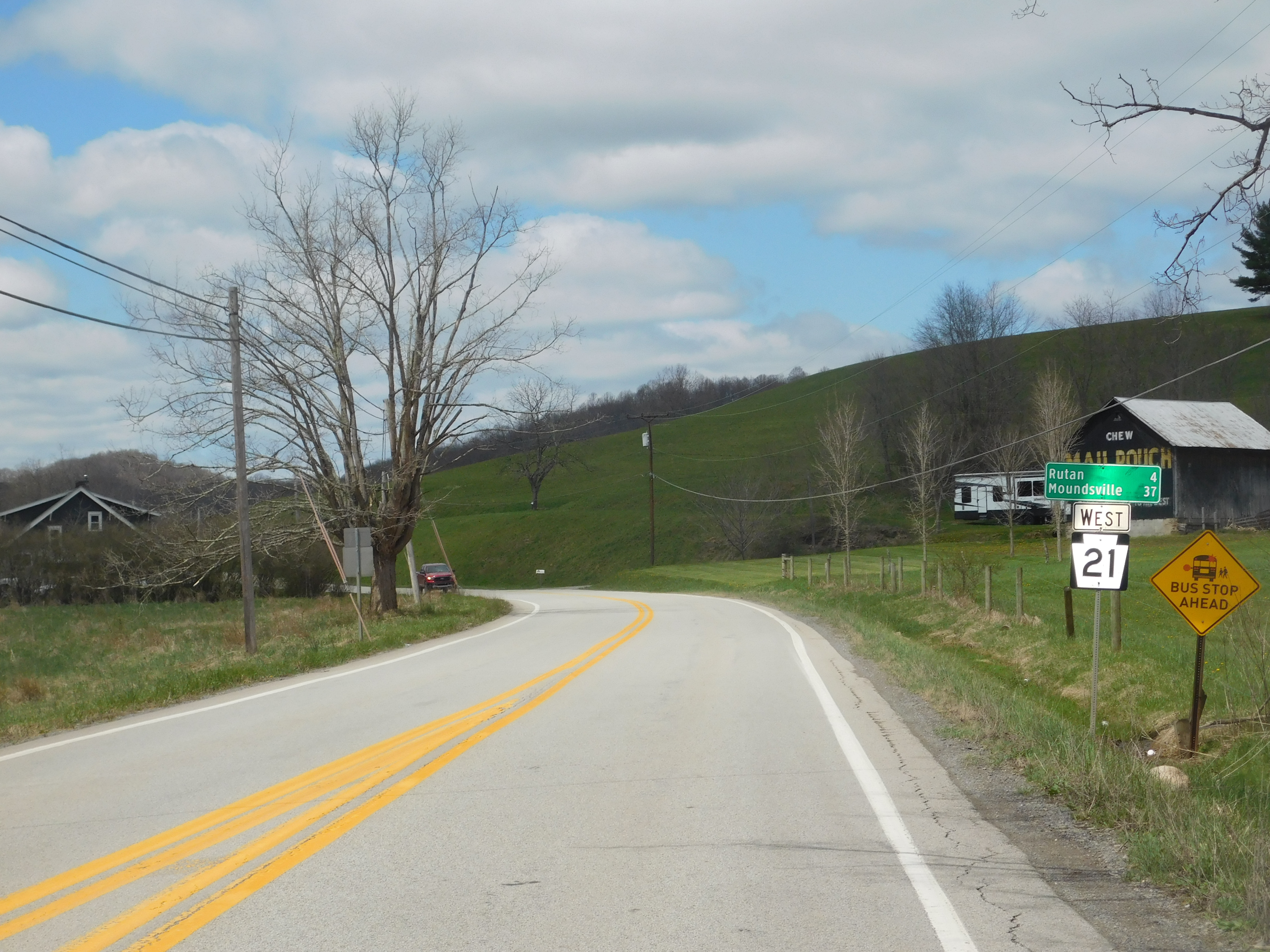
PA 21 away from PA 18

Pennsylvania Route 21 enters Greene County in Richhill Township near the village of Polen. The highway winds its way through the hilly and sparsely populated area passing Ryerson Station State Park to the north. It continues to the northeast into Gray Township where it veers to the southeast toward the village of Rogersville in Center Township. Just before reaching Rogersville, Route 21 merges with Pennsylvania Route 18 near West Greene High School. Route 18 leaves Route 21 near West Waynesburg while Route 21 continues into the borough of Waynesburg.

In Waynesburg, PA 21 is a one-way pair as High Street (west) and Greene Street (east). Both streets are two lanes in the borough. High Street is the arterial road through Waynesburg's business district. While in Waynesburg, it shares its route with U.S. Route 19. PA 21 leaves Waynesburg entering the census-designated place of Morrisville. PA 21 becomes a two-lane road with a shared left turn lane for less than a mile before US 19 leaves the route and PA 21 stays east, becoming a four lane divided highway. Interstate 79 exit 14 is PA 21 in Morrisville signed for PA 21 to Masontown and Waynesburg. PA 21 then leaves Morrisville in Jefferson Township.

PA 21 travels east-southeast through the rest of rural Greene County. The road is mostly level and the countryside is mostly farmland. In Paisley, PA 21 intersects Pennsylvania Route 88, then becomes a four-lane divided highway until it crosses the Masontown Bridge over the Monongahela River.

PA 21 enters Fayette County in the borough of Masontown. It bypasses Masontown to the north and merges with PA 166 (Main St.). After leaving Masontown, the southernmost point on the route, PA 21 becomes McClellandtown Road. It turns to the northeast entering German Township and leaving PA 166. Passing through McClellandtown, PA 21 traverses more densely populated western Fayette County entering South Union Township. The highway enters South Union Township in the village of Uledi. It intersects Dixon Boulevard before entering the city of Uniontown. It has an interchange with U.S. Route 40/U.S. Route 119/ PA Route 43 near Cherry Tree Square. It passes the Uniontown Hospital before ending at US Route 40 Business (Main St.).

== History ==
In 1911, what would become PA 21 was designated as part of Legislative Route 256 between the West Virginia border and Rogersville, Legislative Route 111 between Rogersville and Waynesburg, and Legislative Route 112 between Waynesburg and Uniontown. PA 21 was designated in 1927 to run from the West Virginia border east to US 40 in Uniontown. The route followed its current alignment to west of Carmichaels, where it headed east by way of Carmichaels and New Salem to Uniontown. The alignment utilized a ferry across the Monongahela River. By the time of its inception, PA 21 existed as a paved road between Wind Ridge and PA 121 east of Waynesburg, in the Carmichaels area, and from south of Republic to Uniontown. The remainder of PA 21 was paved by 1940. By 1950, PA 21 was rerouted to follow PA 88 between Carmichaels and Paisley, where it turned east and crossed the Monongahela River at Masontown and followed its current alignment to Uniontown. Bypasses of Carmichaels and Masontown were built by 1960. Also by this time, PA 21 was widened into a divided highway near the PA 88 intersection in Paisley, By 1970, a portion of PA 21 east of Waynesburg was converted to a divided highway. A new, four-lane Masontown Bridge over the Monongahela River was completed in 2015. It replaced the two-lane bridge built in 1925.

== Major intersections ==
County	Location	mi	km	Destinations	Notes
Greene	Richhill Township	0.000	0.000	WV 891 west – Moundsville	Western terminus of PA 21 at West Virginia state line
Greene	Center Township	16.673	26.833	PA 18 south – Holbrook	Western terminus of PA 18 concurrency
Greene	Franklin Township	22.580	36.339	PA 18 north – Sycamore	Eastern terminus of PA 18 concurrency
Greene	Waynesburg	23.438	37.720	US 19 north (Morris Street)	Western terminus of US 19 concurrency
Greene	Waynesburg	23.767	38.249	PA 218 south (Morgan Street)	Northern terminus of PA 218
Greene	Franklin Township	25.018	40.263	US 19 south (High Street) – Mount Morris	Eastern terminus of US 19 concurrency
Greene	Franklin Township	25.129	40.441	PA 188 east (Morris Street) – Jefferson	Western terminus of PA 188
Greene	Franklin Township	26.044– 26.070	41.914– 41.956	I-79 – Washington, Morgantown	Exit 14 (I-79)
Greene	Cumberland Township	37.521	60.384	PA 88 – Carmichaels, Point Marion	
Monongahela River		39.013	62.785	Masontown Bridge	
Fayette	German Township, Fayette County	40.648	65.417	PA 166 south (Main Street) – Masontown, Ronco	Interchange, western terminus of PA 166 concurrency
Fayette	German Township, Fayette County	41.795	67.263	PA 166 north – Republic	Eastern terminus of PA 166 concurrency
Fayette	South Union Township	50.059	80.562	US 40 / US 119 / PA 43 – Connellsville, Brownsville, Hopwood, Morgantown	Trumpet interchange
Fayette	Uniontown	50.751	81.676	US 40 Bus. (Main Street) – Brownsville, Cumberland	Eastern terminus of PA 21
1.000 mi = 1.609 km; 1.000 km = 0.621 mi: Concurrency terminus

== See also ==
- List of crossings of the Monongahela River
