= New Salem, Fayette County, Pennsylvania =

Unincorporated community in Pennsylvania, US

- Census-designated place
- Location within Pennsylvania Location within the United States
- Coordinates: 39°55′30″N 79°50′14″W
- Country: United States
- State: Pennsylvania
- County: Fayette
- Township: Menallen

Area
  - Total: 1.16 sq mi (3.01 km^{2})
  - Land: 1.16 sq mi (3.01 km^{2})
  - Water: 0 sq mi (0.00 km^{2})
- Elevation: 1,070 ft (330 m)

Population (2020)
  - Total: 499
  - Density: 429.8/sq mi (165.96/km^{2})
- Time zone: UTC-5 (Eastern (EST))
  - Summer (DST): UTC-4 (EDT)
- FIPS code: 42-54040
- GNIS feature ID: 1182365

New Salem is an unincorporated community and census-designated place located in Menallen Township, Fayette County, Pennsylvania, United States. It was formerly part of the New Salem-Buffington CDP, before it was split into two separate CDPs for the 2010 census. The population of New Salem was 579 as of the 2010 census.

== Geography ==
New Salem is located in western Fayette County, in the southwestern part of Menallen Township. It is bordered to the west by Buffington and to the south, across Dunlap Creek, by German Township. New Salem Road leads southeast 7 miles (11 km) to Uniontown, the county seat, and northwest 3 miles (5 km) to Pennsylvania Route 166 south of Republic. According to the U.S. Census Bureau, the New Salem CDP has an area of 1.2 square miles (3.0 km^{2}), all land.

== Demographics ==
Historical population
Census	Pop.	Note	%±
2020	499		—
U.S. Decennial Census
