= Pennsylvania Route 166 =

State highway in Fayette County, Pennsylvania, US

Pennsylvania Route 166

Route information
- Maintained by PennDOT
- Length: 21.9 mi (35.2 km)

Major junctions
- South end: US 119 in Point Marion
- PA 21 in Masontown
- North end: US 40 in Redstone Township

Location
- Country: United States
- State: Pennsylvania
- Counties: Fayette

Highway system
- Pennsylvania State Route System; Interstate; US; State; Scenic; Legislative
| ← PA 164 | → PA 167 |

Pennsylvania Route 166 (PA 166) is a north–south state highway in Fayette County, Pennsylvania. It follows the path of the Monongahela River along the entire western border of Fayette County.

== Route description ==
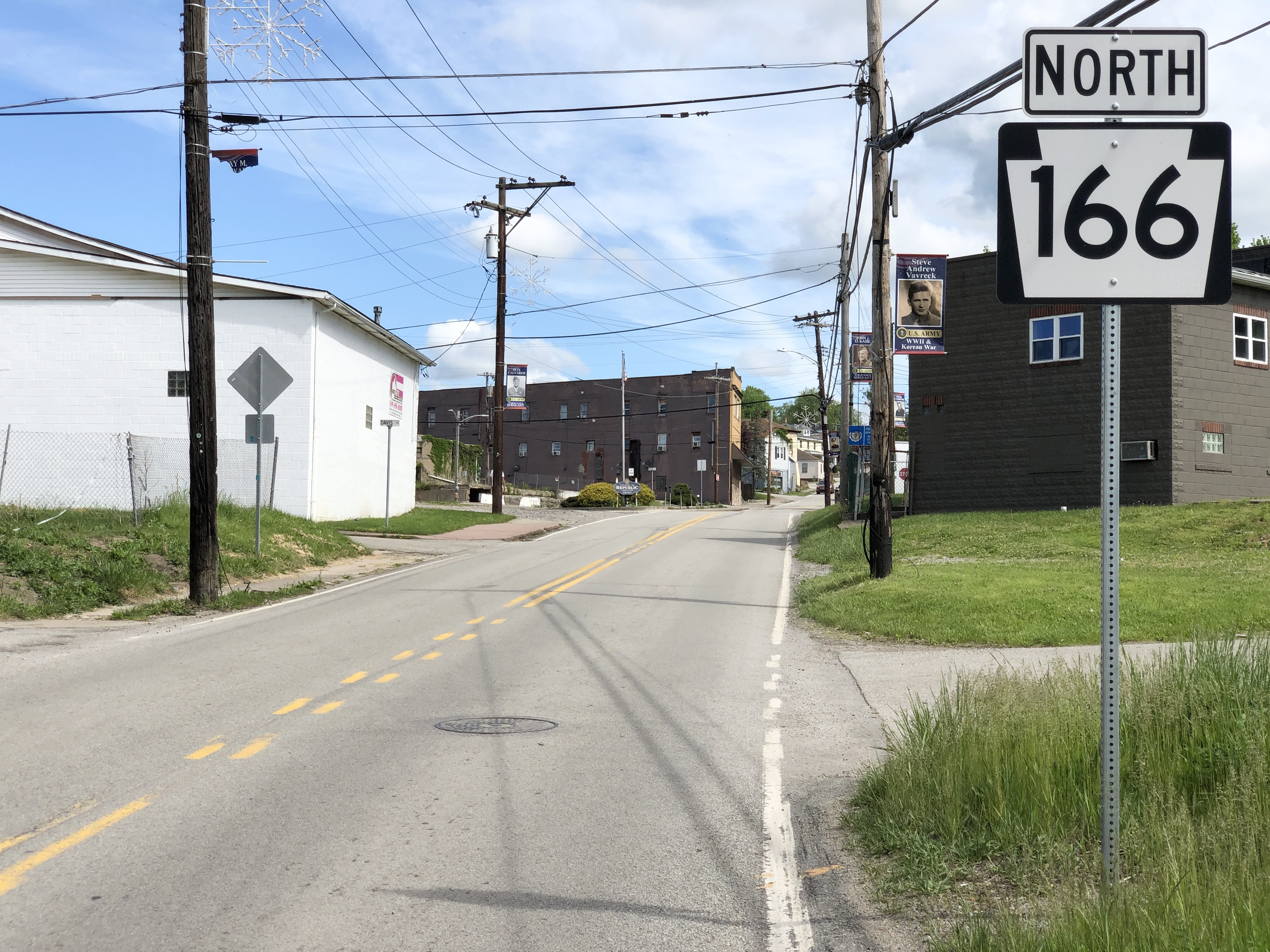
PA 166 northbound in Republic

PA 166 begins at an intersection with US 119 in Springhill Township just north of the confluence of the Monongahela and Cheat Rivers at the borough of Point Marion. From this point, PA 166 heads northwest on two-lane undivided New Geneva Road, following the Monongahela River downstream. The route passes through forested areas with a few homes and farms, turning north and reaching the Friendship Hill National Historic Site. The road turns northeast and runs through the community of Friendship Heights, crossing the George Creek into Nicholson Township. Here, the route passes through the residential community of New Geneva, with Norfolk Southern's Loveridge Secondary railroad line running in between the road and the Monongahela River. After passing through New Geneva, the road heads back into forests. PA 166 turns off of New Geneva Road and stays parallel to the Monongahela River, heading to the north on an unnamed road. The route continues through more wooded areas, passing through the residential communities of Martin, Gallatin, and Grays Landing. Upon crossing into German Township and curving northeast away from the river, PA 166 becomes Masontown Woodside Road and passes through more woodland. The road turns north and enters the borough of Masontown, becoming South Main Street and running past homes. The route heads into the commercial downtown and becomes North Main Street, heading past more residences in the northern part of town.

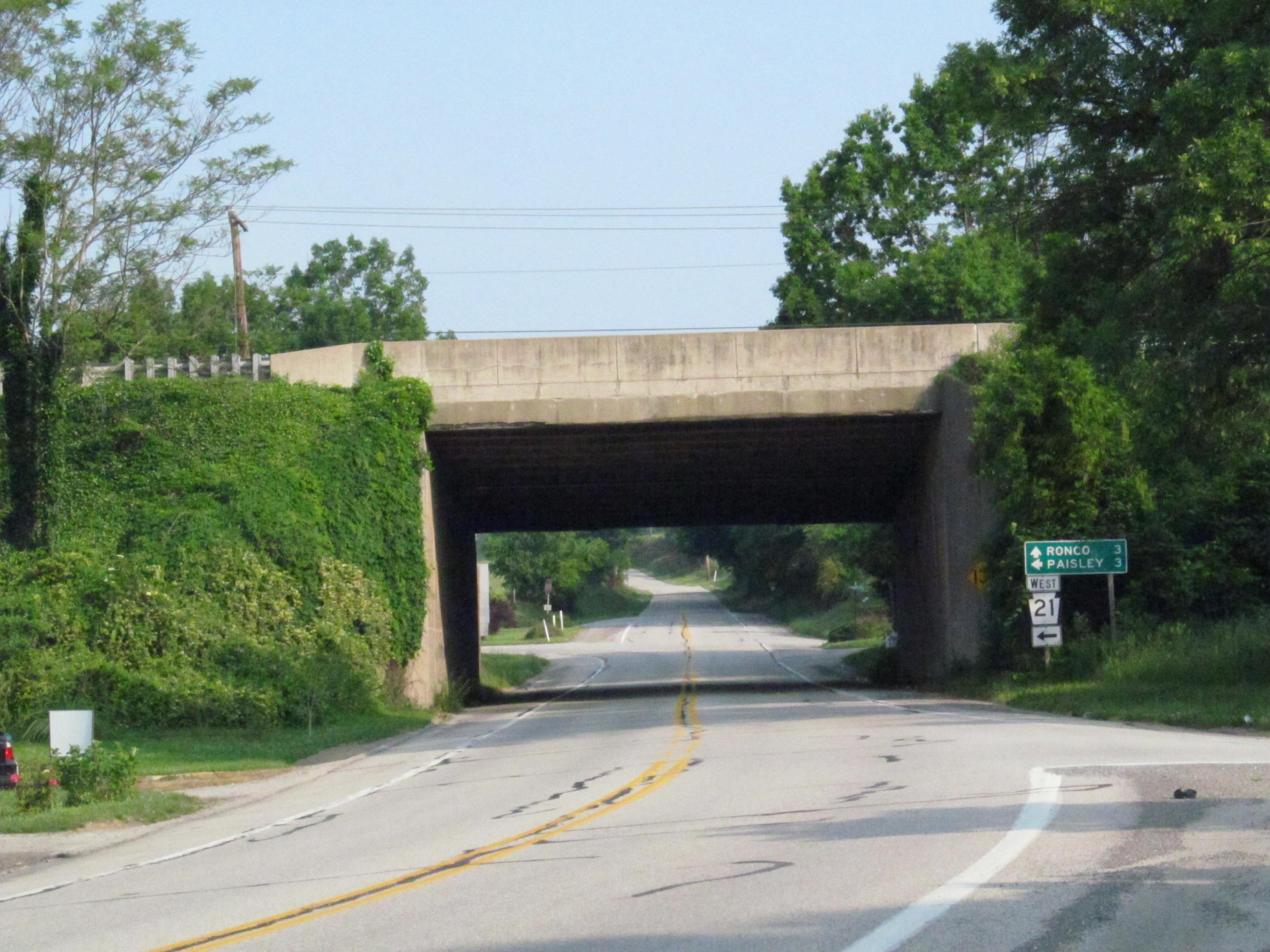
PA 166 at the junction with PA 21 in Masontown

Upon crossing back into German Township, PA 166 comes to an interchange with PA 21, at which point the route heads northeast to form a concurrency with PA 21 on four-lane divided McClellandtown Road. The two routes head through a mix of farmland and woodland with some commercial development, passing through Lardin. PA 166 splits from PA 21 by heading north on two-lane undivided Edenborn Road into wooded areas. The route passes through the residential community of Edenborn before continuing north through forested areas with some homes on Ball Hill Road. PA 166 enters more wooded surroundings as it continues further north along Hartley Hill Road. Upon reaching the community of Hibbs, the road enters Redstone Township and becomes Thompson 1 Road, heading north through a mix of farmland and woodland with some homes. After passing the Thompson No. 1 mine, PA 166 continues into forests, becoming Tower Hill Road as it crosses into Luzerne Township. The road heads back into Redstone Township and passes through the residential community of Republic. Entering a patch of woods, the route crosses into Luzerne Township again and becomes Thornton Road as it serves the community of Allison. PA 166 heads into Redstone Township for a third time and heads through forested areas with a few homes, passing over the PA 43 toll freeway. The route turns northeast into a commercial area and intersects US 40 Business, becoming four-lane divided Grindstone Road. A short distance later, PA 166 comes to its northern terminus at an intersection with US 40.

== Major intersections ==
The entire route is in Fayette County.

| Location | mi | km | Destinations | Notes |
|---|---|---|---|---|
| Point Marion | 0.0 | 0.0 | US 119 (Morgantown Road) – Smithfield, Uniontown, Point Marion, Morgantown | Southern terminus of PA 166 |
| German Township, Fayette County | 10.1 | 16.3 | PA 21 west (McClellandtown Road) – Paisley | Interchange, southern terminus of PA 21 concurrency |
| German Township, Fayette County | 11.2 | 18.0 | PA 21 east (McClellandtown Road) – McClellandtown | Northern terminus of PA 21 concurrency |
| Redstone Township | 21.8 | 35.1 | US 40 Bus. (National Pike) | |
| Redstone Township | 21.9 | 35.2 | US 40 to PA Turnpike 43 | Northern terminus of PA 166 |
1.000 mi = 1.609 km; 1.000 km = 0.621 mi: Concurrency terminus
