= Hibbs, Pennsylvania =

Unincorporated community in Pennsylvania, US

- Unincorporated community
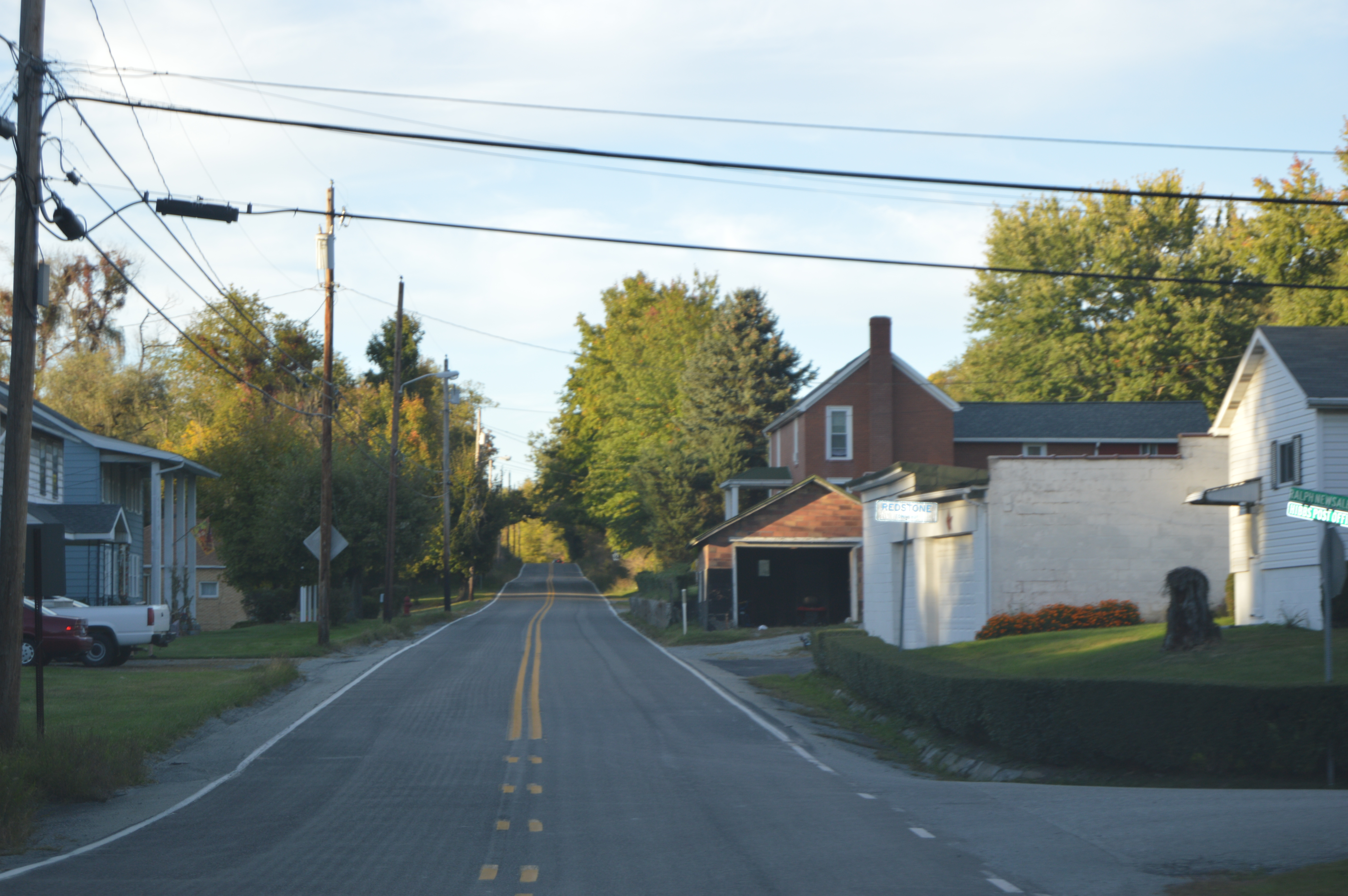

- Location within Pennsylvania
- Coordinates: 39°55′54″N 79°52′57″W
- Country: United States
- State: Pennsylvania
- County: Fayette
- Elevation: 1,004 ft (306 m)
- Time zone: UTC-5 (Eastern (EST))
  - Summer (DST): UTC-4 (EDT)
- ZIP code: 15443
- Area codes: 724, 878
- GNIS feature ID: 1176938

Hibbs is an unincorporated community in Fayette County, Pennsylvania, United States. The community is located along Pennsylvania Route 166, 5.9 miles (9.5 km) north of Masontown. Hibbs has a post office with ZIP code 15443.
