= Leckrone, Pennsylvania =

Unincorporated community in Pennsylvania, US

- Unincorporated community
- Location within Pennsylvania Location within the United States
- Coordinates: 39°51′41″N 79°52′12″W
- Country: United States
- State: Pennsylvania
- County: Fayette
- Township: German
- Elevation: 968 ft (295 m)
- Time zone: UTC-5 (Eastern (EST))
  - Summer (DST): UTC-4 (EDT)
- ZIP code: 15454
- Area codes: 724, 878
- GNIS feature ID: 1179107

Leckrone is an unincorporated community that is located in Fayette County, Pennsylvania, United States. The community is situated 1.9 miles (3.1 km) northeast of Masontown. Leckrone has a post office, with ZIP code 15454.

== History ==
The most well-known industry in Leckrone was mining and coke ovens. Construction of the manufacturing plants began in mid-1899 with the first coke drawn on June 2, 1900. The operations were serviced by a spur of the Smithfield and Masontown Branch of the Baltimore and Ohio Railroad, which opened on April 7, 1900. As of 1901, Leckrone No. 1 Mine had 525 acres (212 ha) of coal and 250 coke ovens, while the No. 2 Mine had 300 acres (120 ha) of coal tributary and 150 ovens.
