= Masontown Bridge =

- Coordinates: 39.8531°N 79.9268°W
- Carries: 4 divided lanes of PA 21
- Crosses: Monongahela River
- Locale: Masontown, Pennsylvania and Monongahela Township, Pennsylvania
- Other name(s): Intercounty Bridge
- Maintained by: PennDOT

Characteristics
- Design: plate girder bridge
- Total length: 1,700 feet (520 m)

History
- Constructed by: Brayman Construction
- Opened: 1925; 2013–2015
- Closed: 2013

The Masontown Bridge is a four-lane, concrete, plate girder bridge that carries vehicular traffic across the Monongahela River between Masontown, Pennsylvania and Monongahela Township, Pennsylvania (near Carmichaels), by way of Pennsylvania Route 21.

== History and notable features ==
The current structure was completed and opened in December 2015 after a three-year project costing $49.6 million to replace the previous truss bridge that was built in 1925 and rehabilitated in 1993. The first two lanes of the new bridge were completed in 2013, at which point the old truss bridge was imploded to make way for the other two lanes of the new bridge. It cost $50 million to build the new bridge. The new bridge was constructed by Brayman Construction.

The Pennsylvania Department of Transportation undertook the bridge replacement project as part of a years-long effort to modernize and improve Route 21 and expand it in some areas.

The old bridge was one of many large truss bridges built in Pennsylvania and Ohio by Farris Engineering in the 1920s. The bridge was constructed by the Independent Bridge Company, Pittsburgh. The structure passed directly in front of the Hatfield's Ferry Power Station and carried a large amount of associated truck traffic.

It replaced a ferry at the site that had been established in 1769. That was first called the Republican Ferry, but later called McCann Ferry after the family that operated it.

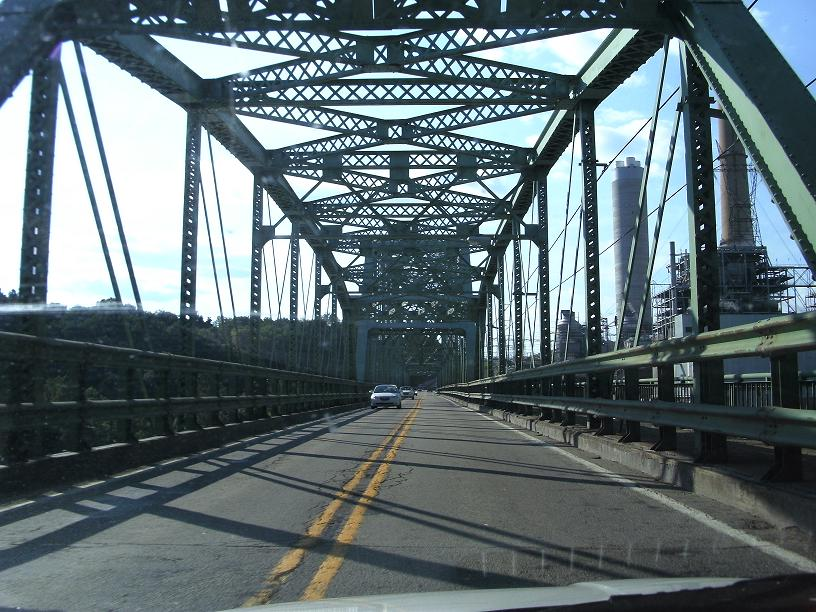
PA 21 on the previous Masontown Bridge, a truss bridge, demolished in 2013

== See also ==
- List of crossings of the Monongahela River

== See also ==
- List of crossings of the Monongahela River
