= Andrew Rabb House =

Historic house in Pennsylvania, United States

- U.S. National Register of Historic Places
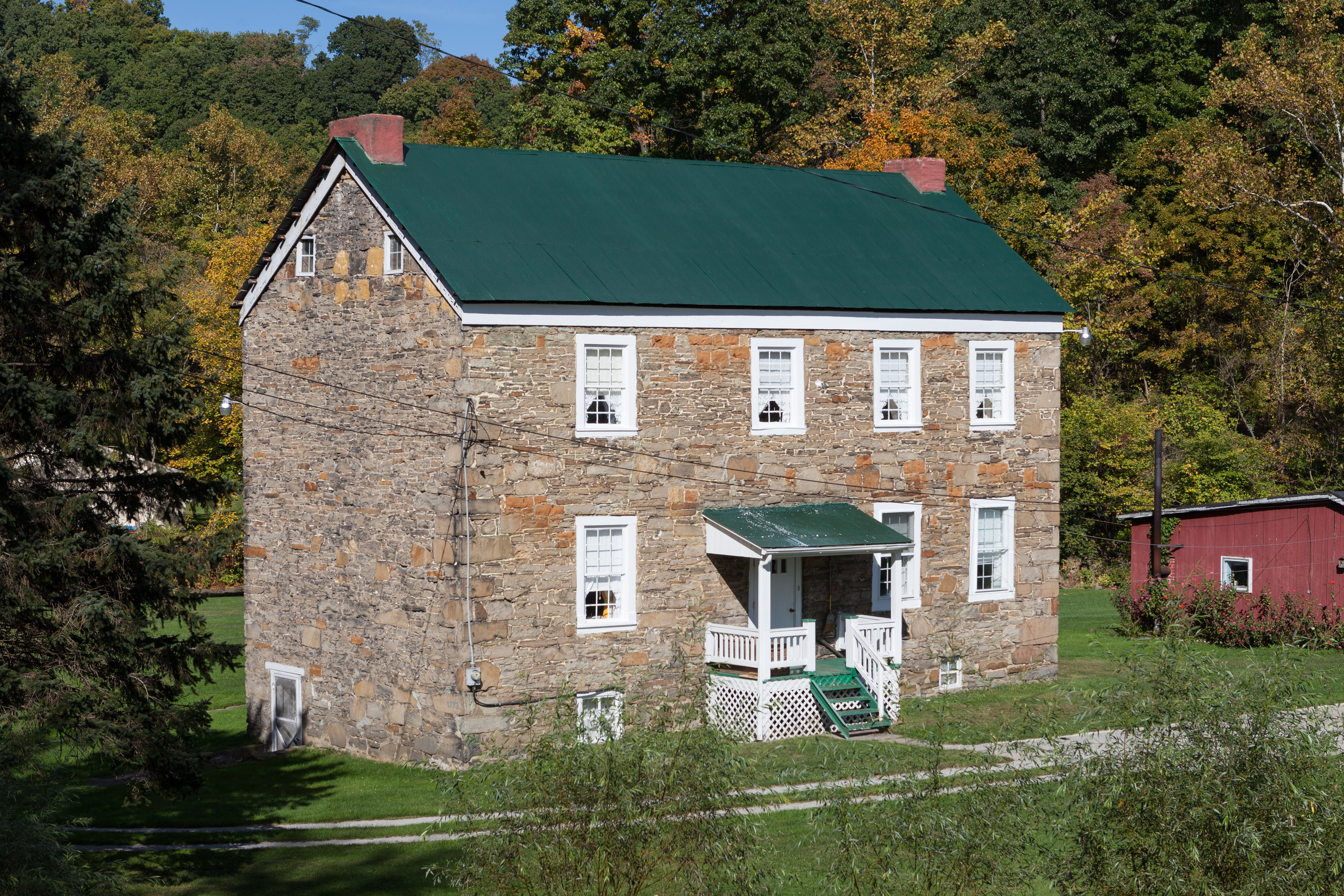
- The house in September 2014

- Location within Pennsylvania Location within the United States
- Location: Off Pennsylvania Route 166 north of Masontown, German Township, Pennsylvania
- Coordinates: 39°52′15″N 79°54′27″W
- Area: 0.8 acres (0.32 ha)
- Built: 1773; 253 years ago
- Architectural style: vernacular Georgian
- MPS: Whiskey Rebellion Resources in Southwestern Pennsylvania MPS
- NRHP reference No.: 92001497
- Added to NRHP: November 12, 1992

Andrew Rabb House is a historic home located at German Township, Fayette County, Pennsylvania. It was built in 1773, and is a 2 1/2-story, 5-bay, stone dwelling in a vernacular Georgian style. It measures 44 feet by 24 feet. Andrew Rabb (c. 1740 – 1804) was a locally prominent and wealthy distiller who was significant in the Whiskey Rebellion in Fayette County.

It was added to the National Register of Historic Places in 1992.
