= German Township, Fayette County, Pennsylvania =

Township in Pennsylvania, United States

Coordinates: 39°53′29″N 79°51′53″W

German Township
- Township
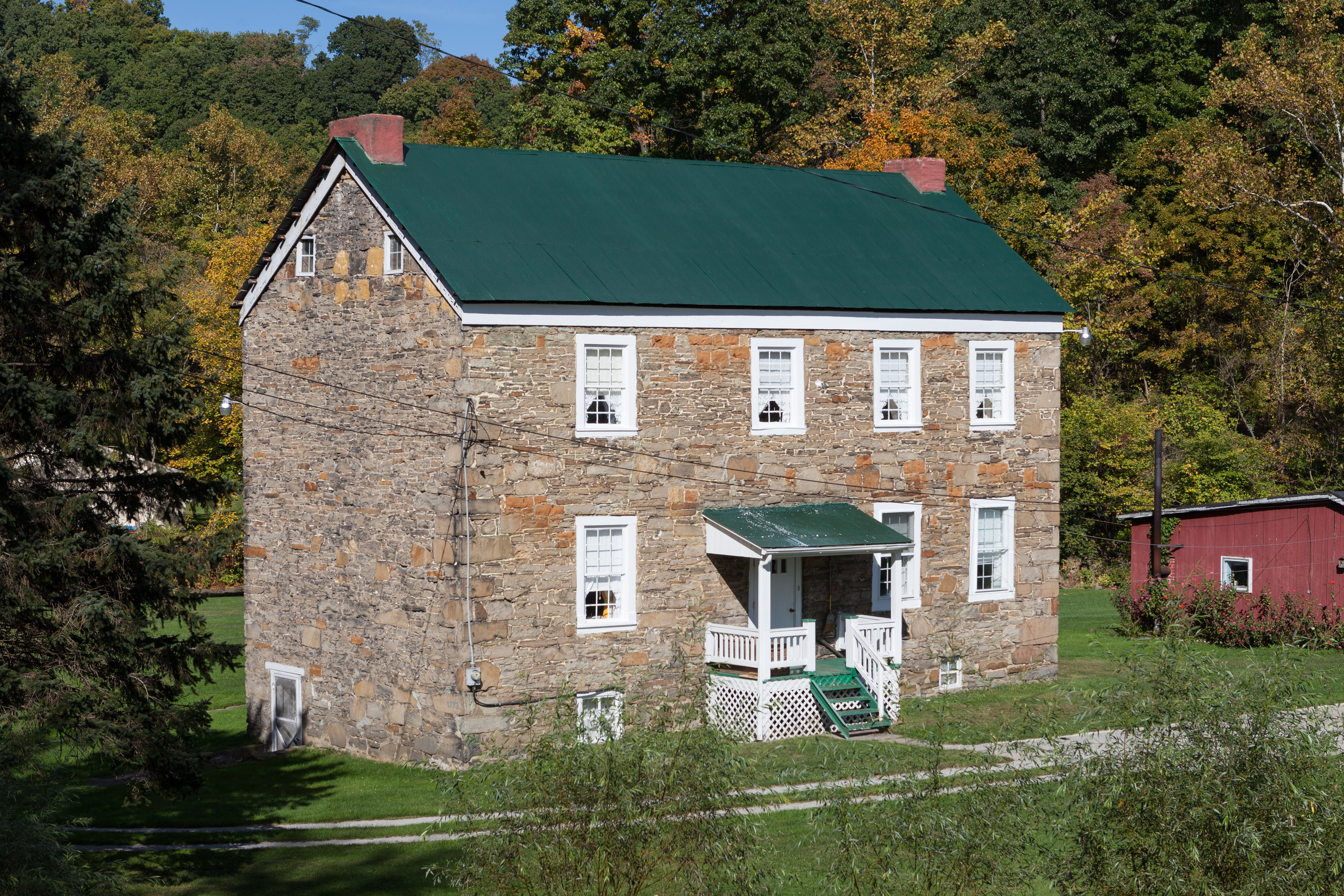
- Andrew Rabb House, built 1773

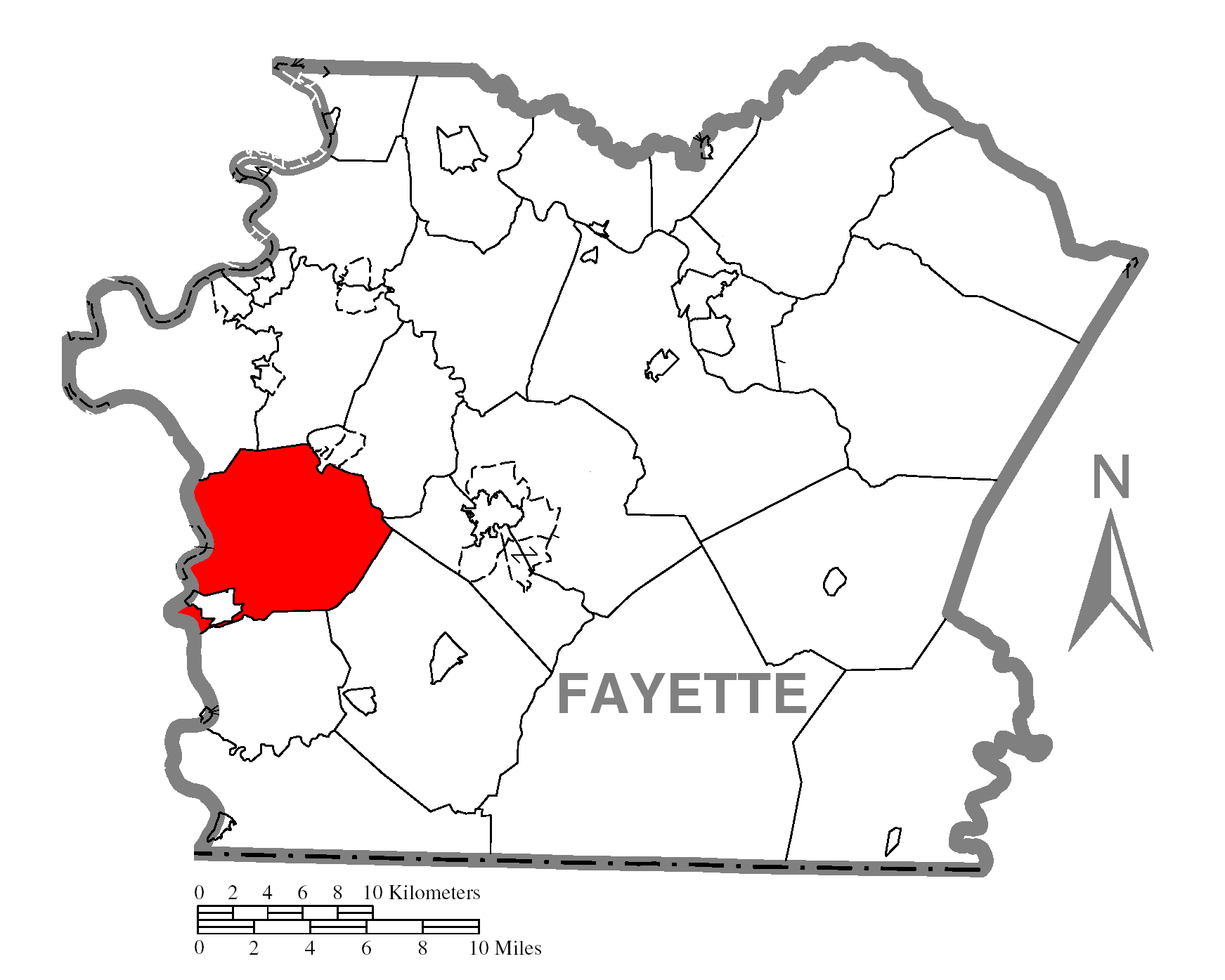
- Location of German Township in Fayette County

- Location of Fayette County in Pennsylvania
- Country: United States
- State: Pennsylvania
- County: Fayette

Area
  - Total: 33.85 sq mi (87.67 km^{2})
  - Land: 33.48 sq mi (86.71 km^{2})
  - Water: 0.37 sq mi (0.97 km^{2})

Population (2020)
  - Total: 4,672 ▼
  - Estimate (2022): 4,562
  - Density: 150/sq mi (57/km^{2})
- Time zone: UTC-4 (EST)
  - Summer (DST): UTC-5 (EDT)
- Area code: 724
- FIPS code: 42-051-28856
- Website: germantownship.org

German Township is a township in Fayette County, Pennsylvania, United States. The population was 4,672 at the 2020 census, a decline from the figure of 5,097 tabulated in 2010. McClellandtown is the township's largest village. The Albert Gallatin Area School District serves the region.

McClellandtown, Edenborn, Leckrone, Ronco, Footedale, Adah, Palmer, Hibbs, and Lambert are located within the township.

== History ==
German Township is one of the nine original townships of Fayette County, established by the first court held at Uniontown, on December 27, 1783.

The Andrew Rabb House was listed on the National Register of Historic Places in 1992.

== Geography ==
German Township is on the western edge of Fayette County, bordered on the west by the Monongahela River. To the north are Luzerne and Redstone townships, to the northeast is Menallen Township, to the east is South Union Township, to the southeast is Georges Township, and to the south is Nicholson Township, all in Fayette County. To the west across the river are Monongahela and Cumberland townships in Greene County. The borough of Masontown is in the southwest corner of the township but is a separate municipality.

According to the United States Census Bureau, German Township has a total area of 33.9 square miles (87.7 km^{2}), of which 33.5 square miles (86.7 km^{2}) is land and 0.39 square miles (1.0 km^{2}), or 1.10%, is water.

Pennsylvania Route 21 crosses the township, leading east to Uniontown, the Fayette County seat, and west across the Monongahela to Waynesburg. Pennsylvania Route 166 leads north from PA 21 near Edenborn in the center of German Township to Republic in Redstone Township.

== Demographics ==
Historical population
Census	Pop.	Note	%±
1910	11,844		—
1920	14,582		23.1%
1930	16,341		12.1%
1940	15,507		−5.1%
1950	12,040		−22.4%
1960	8,442		−29.9%
1970	6,808		−19.4%
1980	5,900		−13.3%
1990	5,596		−5.2%
2000	5,595		0.0%
2010	5,097		−8.9%
2020	4,672		−8.3%
2022 (est.)	4,562		−2.4%
U.S. Decennial Census

As of the 2000 census, there were 5,595 people, 2,148 households, and 1,525 families residing in the township. The population density was 167.9 inhabitants per square mile (64.8/km^{2}). There were 2,333 housing units at an average density of 70.0 per square mile (27.0/km^{2}). The racial makeup of the township was 91.85% White, 7.20% African American, 0.20% Native American, 0.07% Asian, 0.09% from other races, and 0.59% from two or more races. Hispanic or Latino of any race were 0.45% of the population.

There were 2,148 households, out of which 31.2% had children under the age of 18 living with them, 52.0% were married couples living together, 13.1% had a female householder with no husband present, and 29.0% were non-families. 26.2% of all households were made up of individuals, and 14.1% had someone living alone who was 65 years of age or older. The average household size was 2.57 and the average family size was 3.10.

In the township the population was spread out, with 24.8% under the age of 18, 7.0% from 18 to 24, 28.1% from 25 to 44, 24.3% from 45 to 64, and 15.9% who were 65 years of age or older. The median age was 39 years. For every 100 females there were 91.9 males. For every 100 females age 18 and over, there were 86.9 males.

The median income for a household in the township was $27,434, and the median income for a family was $32,428. Males had a median income of $33,646 versus $20,333 for females. The per capita income for the township was $16,769. About 16.9% of families and 19.9% of the population were below the poverty line, including 27.6% of those under age 18 and 15.7% of those age 65 or over.

== Notable people ==
- C. Vivian Stringer, basketball coach (born in Edenborn)
- Todd Tamanend Clark, poet and composer (resides in German Township since 1993)
