= Edenborn, Pennsylvania =

Unincorporated community in Pennsylvania, US

- Census-designated place
- C. Vivian Stringer Seal
- Location within Pennsylvania Location within the United States
- Coordinates: 39°52′55″N 79°53′15″W
- Country: United States
- State: Pennsylvania
- County: Fayette
- Township: German

Area
  - Total: 0.39 sq mi (1.00 km^{2})
  - Land: 0.39 sq mi (1.00 km^{2})
  - Water: 0 sq mi (0.00 km^{2})
- Elevation: 1,040 ft (320 m)

Population (2020)
  - Total: 229
  - Density: 592/sq mi (228.5/km^{2})
- Time zone: UTC-5 (Eastern (EST))
  - Summer (DST): UTC-4 (EDT)
- FIPS code: 42-22344
- GNIS feature ID: 2634216

Edenborn is an unincorporated community and census-designated place in German Township, Fayette County, Pennsylvania, United States. It is located along Pennsylvania Route 166, just north of Pennsylvania Route 21. Uniontown is 10 miles (16 km) to the east, Brownsville is 11 miles (18 km) to the north, and Waynesburg is 18 miles (29 km) to the west. As of the 2010 census, the population was 294.

== Demographics ==
Historical population
Census	Pop.	Note	%±
2020	229		—
U.S. Decennial Census

The 2020 United States census gave the population as 229.
