= Ronco, Pennsylvania =

Unincorporated community in Pennsylvania, US

- Census-designated place
- Location within Pennsylvania Location within the United States
- Coordinates: 39°52′07″N 79°55′16″W
- Country: United States
- State: Pennsylvania
- County: Fayette
- Township: German

Area
  - Total: 0.57 sq mi (1.47 km^{2})
  - Land: 0.51 sq mi (1.32 km^{2})
  - Water: 0.054 sq mi (0.14 km^{2})
- Elevation: 984 ft (300 m)

Population (2020)
  - Total: 209
  - Density: 409.6/sq mi (158.16/km^{2})
- Time zone: UTC-5 (Eastern (EST))
  - Summer (DST): UTC-4 (EDT)
- ZIP code: 15476
- FIPS code: 42-65976
- GNIS feature ID: 2634272

Ronco is an unincorporated community and census-designated place in German Township, Fayette County, Pennsylvania, United States. It is located 2 miles (3 km) north of the borough of Masontown, along the east bank of the Monongahela River. As of the 2010 census, the population of Ronco was 256.

== Demographics ==
Historical population
Census	Pop.	Note	%±
2020	209		—
U.S. Decennial Census

The 2020 United States census gave the population as 209 people.
