= Marie Hochmuth Nichols =

American rhetorical critic (1908–1978)

Marie Hochmuth Nichols (1908–1978) was an influential rhetorical critic.

== Personal life ==
Born in Dunbar, Pennsylvania in 1908, Marie Hochmuth Nichols attended the University of Pittsburgh, graduating with a bachelor's and a master's degree, and the University of Wisconsin, receiving her Ph.D. She then went on to teach at Mt. Mercy College, now Carlow University, in Pittsburgh, Pennsylvania ( -1939) and the University of Illinois (1939–1976). Marie was married to Alan G. Nichols ( -1973), professor emeritus at the University of Southern California. She received her honorary doctorate in humane letters from Drury College (1978) and died later that year.

== Work in rhetoric ==
During her career, which covered more than thirty years, Nichols acted as an active participant in the Speech Communication Association/National Communication Association (SCA/NCA). Further into her life she became the first female editor of the Quarterly Journal of Speech (1963–1965). She would also become the president of the SCA/NCA (1969), “the first woman to become elected by a vote of the whole membership”. Nichols was honored with the “Distinguished Service Award” by the SCA/NCA (1976) and after her death, Nichols was honored by the SCA/NCA and declared a Distinguished Scholar (1995).

Nichols’ major themes can be summarized into three parts:

- Permanence and change- finding the balance in honoring the past while being able to look forward into our future.
- Use of language- “Words are ‘terministic screens’ that both select and deflect. They not only describe, they prescribe.”
- Balance in public discussion- communication does not have to be ill-mannered in order to be passionate.

According to John H. Patton, “Nichols stands as a preeminent voice in the history of rhetorical theory and criticism. [She] emphasized the permanent and enduring qualities of rhetoric, qualities that she consistently expressed in her role as a teacher, her scholarship, public essays and speeches, and her academic leadership of the speech communication profession. She worried greatly about the fragmentation and apparent disintegration of the rhetorical tradition from its roots in classics and history. Simultaneously, her intellectual scope and expertise was among the broadest and deepest in the field, or any field for that matter. She consistently encouraged fresh, innovative insights from diverse theoretical and critical perspectives. Within that diversity she clearly located a central core that unified the study and practice of rhetorical thought and action.”

== Published works ==
- Kenneth Burke and the "New Rhetoric" (1952)
- American Speeches (1954)
- The History and Criticism of American Public Address, III (1955)
- "First Inaugural Address" (1955)
- "The Criticism of Rhetoric" (1955)
- I. A. Richards and the New Rhetoric (1958)
- Rhetoric and Criticism (1963)
- "When You Set Out for Ithaka" (1977)
