= Sagamore, Fayette County, Pennsylvania =

Unincorporated community in Pennsylvania, US

- Unincorporated community
- Location within Pennsylvania Location within the United States
- Coordinates: 40°01′57″N 79°23′52″W
- Country: United States
- State: Pennsylvania
- County: Fayette
- Township: Saltlick
- Elevation: 1,394 ft (425 m)
- Time zone: UTC-5 (Eastern (EST))
  - Summer (DST): UTC-4 (EDT)
- Area code: 724
- GNIS feature ID: 1185716

Sagamore is an unincorporated community in Fayette County, Pennsylvania, United States.
