= Albert Gallatin Area School District =

School district in Pennsylvania, United States

Coordinates: 39.82976°N 79.77054°W

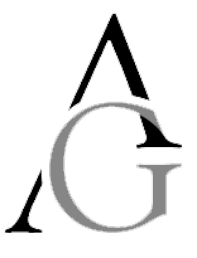

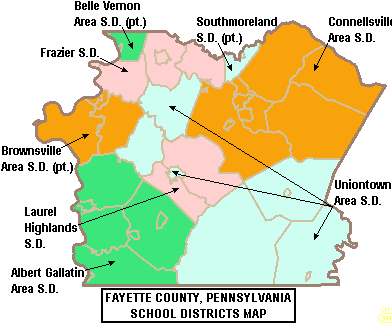
- Location of Albert Gallatin School District in Fayette County, Pennsylvania

Address
- 2625 Morgantown Road Uniontown, Fayette County, Pennsylvania, 15401; United States

District information
- Type: Public

Students and staff
- District mascot: Colonials

Other information
- Website: www.agasd.org

The Albert Gallatin Area School District is a large, rural, public school district located in Fayette County, Pennsylvania. It is named after Albert Gallatin, former U.S. Secretary of the Treasury, planner of the Lewis and Clark expedition, engineer of the financial details of the Louisiana Purchase, and founder of New York University. It serves the boroughs of Masontown, Fairchance, Point Marion, and Smithfield. It also serves German, Springhill, Georges, and Nicholson Townships. It encompasses approximately 142 square miles (370 km2). According to 2000 US federal census data, the Albert Gallatin Area School District serves a resident population of 25,282. By 2010, the District's population had declined to 23,852 people. The educational attainment levels for the Albert Gallatin Area School District population (25 years old and over) were 82.4% high school graduates and 11.9% college graduates. The district is one of the 500 public school districts of Pennsylvania.

According to the Pennsylvania Budget and Policy Center, 61.4% of Albert Gallatin Area School District's pupils lived at 185% or below the Federal Poverty Level as shown by their eligibility for the federal free or reduced-price school meal programs in 2012. In 2013, the Pennsylvania Department of Education reported that 24 students in the Albert Gallatin Area School District were homeless.

In 2009, Albert Gallatin Area School District residents' per capita income was $14,454, while the median family income was $31,607. In the Commonwealth, the median family income was $49,501 and the United States median family income was $49,445 in 2010. In Fayette County, the median household income was $39,115. By 2013, the median household income in the United States rose to $52,100. In 2014, the median household income in the USA was $53,700.

Albert Gallatin Area High School, which is part of the Albert Gallatin Area School District, is located 7 miles (11 km) south of Uniontown in York Run. The southern end of the Albert Gallatin School District borders West Virginia, and Pittsburgh is approximately 50 miles (80 km) north of the high school. Morgantown, West Virginia is 20 miles (32 km) to the south.

Recent building improvements include a state-of-the-art stadium and a grass playing field. The school mascot is named the Colonial. The school is locally known by its initials, AG.

== History ==
Albert Gallatin Area School District was created as an original combination between Masontown and Point Marion High Schools in 1958, creating a new senior high school in Friendship Hill, and the former schools became elementary and junior high schools.

In 1958, Fairchance High School and Georges High School consolidated to become Fairchance-Georges High School. These two joint school boards, along with several other local school boards, became part of a state consolidation plan in 1966, creating the Albert Gallatin Area School District while retaining three separate high schools: Albert Gallatin, Fairchance-Georges, and German Township.

In 1987, a second consolidation was made, creating the Tri-Valley High School as the sole senior high school for the district, utilizing the old Fairchance-Georges building. The former Albert Gallatin High School became Albert Gallatin Junior High South, while German Township became Albert Gallatin Junior High School North.

The mascot for the North was the Lions, and the Eagles were the mascot for the South, with the idea that when the two schools combined at the senior high, they would become the Griffins.

In 1993, retaining the same secondary building composition, the high school's name was changed to Albert Gallatin. Since then, many of the schools have been upgraded, including the Senior High, and the Junior Highs became Middle Schools after their respective renovations (George J. Plava - German Central in 1989, South and Friendship Hill Elementary in 1999, and North in 2004, respectively) Other schools were replaced, including Masontown Elementary (1999) and A.L. Wilson (2008—a merger of the former Fairchance Elementary and Windy Hill School).

Unfortunately, other schools have been shut down over the decades, including Point Marion Elementary and later Junior High (1980s) and D. Ferd Swaney Elementary (2016).

== Schools ==
The Albert Gallatin Area School District currently operates five elementary schools, two middle schools, and one senior high school.

- Albert Gallatin High School
- Albert Gallatin South Middle School
- Albert Gallatin North Middle School
- A.L. Wilson Elementary School
- Friendship Hill Elementary School
- George J. Plava Elementary School
- Masontown Elementary School
- Smithfield Elementary School

== Extracurriculars ==
The district offers a wide variety of clubs, activities, and an extensive sports program.

The football program left the WPIAL and became an independent team in 2019.

=== Sports ===
The District funds:

Boys

- Baseball - AAAA
- Basketball- AAAA
- Cross Country - AAA
- Football - AAA
- Golf - AAA
- Soccer - AAA
- Track and Field - AAA
- Wrestling - AAA

Girls

- Basketball - AAA
- Cross Country - AAA
- Soccer (Fall) - AAA
- Softball - AAA
- Track and Field - AAA
- Volleyball - AAA

According to the PIAA directory, July 2012
