= South Uniontown, Pennsylvania =

Unincorporated community in Pennsylvania, US

- Census-designated place
- Location within Pennsylvania Location within the United States
- Coordinates: 39°53′38″N 79°44′48″W
- Country: United States
- State: Pennsylvania
- County: Fayette
- Township: South Union

Area
  - Total: 0.46 sq mi (1.2 km^{2})
  - Land: 0.46 sq mi (1.2 km^{2})
  - Water: 0 sq mi (0.0 km^{2})
- Elevation: 1,076 ft (328 m)

Population (2010)
  - Total: 1,360
  - Density: 2,991/sq mi (1,154.7/km^{2})
- Time zone: UTC-5 (Eastern (EST))
  - Summer (DST): UTC-4 (EDT)
- ZIP code: 15401
- Area code: 724
- FIPS code: 42-72552
- GNIS feature ID: 2633311

South Uniontown is a census-designated place in South Union Township, Pennsylvania, United States. As of the 2010 census, the population was 1,360.

The community borders the southwestern side of the city of Uniontown, the Fayette County seat. U.S. routes 40 and 119, a four-lane bypass of the city and in this area part of the Mon–Fayette Expressway, form the western edge of the CDP.

== Geography ==
According to the U.S. Census Bureau, the South Uniontown CDP has a total area of 0.46 square miles (1.2 km^{2}), all land.
