= Adah, Pennsylvania =

Unincorporated community in Pennsylvania, US

Coordinates: 39°53′47″N 79°55′19″W

Adah is an unincorporated community in German Township, Fayette County in the U.S. state of Pennsylvania. It is known as a patch town as it was created to support a coal mine. Adah is the home of the Palmer Mine, one of Henry Clay Frick's holdings. It is also the birthplace of boxer Tommy Karpency, a contender in the light heavyweight division.
