= Mike Nixon =

American football player and coach (1911–2000)

No. 12, 30
- Position: Halfback

Personal information
- Born: November 21, 1911; Masontown, Pennsylvania, U.S.
- Died: September 22, 2000 (aged 88); Schaumburg, Illinois, U.S.
- Listed height: 5 ft 11 in (1.80 m)
- Listed weight: 181 lb (82 kg)

Career information
- College: University of Pittsburgh

Career history

Playing
- 1935: Pittsburgh Pirates
- 1942: Brooklyn Dodgers

Coaching
- 1936–1939: Pittsburgh Steelers (assistant)
- 1940–1941: West Virginia (assistant)
- 1946-1951: Pittsburgh Steelers (assistant)
- 1952–1953: Chicago Cardinals (assistant)
- 1954–1958: Washington Redskins (assistant)
- 1959–1960: Washington Redskins
- 1961–1964: Pittsburgh Steelers (assistant)
- 1965: Pittsburgh Steelers
- 1966–1968: Philadelphia Eagles (assistant)

scout
- 1969 – c. 1981: Cleveland Browns
- Coaching profile at Pro Football Reference

Other information
- Military career
- Allegiance: United States
- Branch: U.S. Navy
- Service years: 1943–1946
- Rank: Lieutenant
- Conflicts: World War II

Michael Regis Nixon (November 21, 1911 – September 22, 2000) was an American football player, coach and scout. His most prominent positions were as head coach of the National Football League (NFL)'s Washington Redskins and Pittsburgh Steelers.

== Early life ==
The son of an immigrant coal miner, Nixon was born and raised in the Pittsburgh area community of Masontown, Pennsylvania, and attended the University of Pittsburgh, where he played three seasons under the legendary Jock Sutherland, including action in the 1933 Rose Bowl. At Pitt, he won All-America recognition as a running back, while also working summers in the same coal mines as his father. He then advanced to the NFL, but played just one season with the Steelers in 1935 before entering the coaching fraternity at his alma mater the next year.

During this same period, he also played third base in minor league baseball's Southern Association, while seeking other coaching opportunities. When Sutherland resigned on March 6, 1939, Nixon stayed on for a year before joining Bill Kern's staff at West Virginia University.

== Professional coaching career ==
Nixon departed after two seasons to return to the professional level as an assistant with the NFL's Brooklyn Dodgers. With player shortages beginning that year due to World War II, Nixon briefly resumed his playing career by signing a contract with the team on November 19, 1942. Nixon himself eventually left to serve as a lieutenant in the U.S. Navy for three years, but returned in 1946 as a Steelers assistant under his former coach Sutherland.

He stayed in that role for the next six seasons, but left on June 3, 1952, to join Joe Kuharich, who had been named head coach with the Chicago Cardinals. Kuharich's tenure with the team was brief, but when he was named as head coach of the Redskins after the 1953 NFL season, Nixon followed him to the nation's capital.

Kuharich's five-year tenure in Washington was only slightly better than his Cardinals stint, with the mentor leaving for the head coaching position at the University of Notre Dame following the conclusion of the 1958 NFL season. On December 22 of that year, Nixon earned his first head coaching position when he was promoted by Redskins' owner George Preston Marshall.

The next two years would be miserable for Nixon, who watched his team compile a record of 4–18–2, predictably resulting in his dismissal after the 1960 NFL season had ended. After seeking another head coaching job, Nixon settled for an assistant's role on February 11, 1961, back with the Steelers under Buddy Parker. After a 6-8 campaign in his first year, the team improved to a 9–5 record the following year, and was one game away from winning the Eastern Conference title in 1963. However, by the time the next season started, age and injuries had caught up with the Steelers. Two weeks before the start of the 1965 NFL season, Parker abruptly quit. Nixon was promoted to head coach the next day, but endured (up to that time) the franchise's worst season with a 2–12 mark.

Nixon was fired after the season ended, but found work a few months later, again with Kuharich, now the head coach of the Philadelphia Eagles. Following a 9–5 season in 1966, the team won three fewer games the following year, then bottomed out with a 2–12 mark in 1968. Once again, Nixon was looking for work after Kuharich was dismissed after the arrival of new owner Leonard Tose.

On July 1, 1969, Nixon was signed as a scout for the Cleveland Browns, spending his first season looking only at teams in the American Football League. The strategy was for Nixon to gauge the strengths and weaknesses of the teams that would be facing the Browns after they changed leagues because the AFL–NFL merger. In subsequent years, Nixon focused on college scouting, becoming the team's director of college scouting on February 20, 1974. He kept that role until his retirement in the early 1980s.

Nixon died in 2000 and was buried in Arlington National Cemetery.
