= Lake Lynn, Pennsylvania =

Unincorporated community in Pennsylvania, US

- Unincorporated community
- Location within Pennsylvania Location within the United States
- Coordinates: 39°43′41″N 79°51′38″W
- Country: United States
- State: Pennsylvania
- County: Fayette
- Township: Springhill
- Elevation: 988 ft (301 m)
- Time zone: UTC-5 (Eastern (EST))
  - Summer (DST): UTC-4 (EDT)
- ZIP code: 15451
- Area code: 724
- GNIS feature ID: 1178785

Lake Lynn is an unincorporated community in Fayette County, Pennsylvania, United States. Lake Lynn is located on the Cheat River, 2 miles (3.2 km) east-southeast of Point Marion. Lake Lynn had a post office with ZIP code 15451.
