= Allison, Pennsylvania =

Unincorporated community in Pennsylvania, US

- Census-designated place
- Location within Pennsylvania Location within the United States
- Coordinates: 39°59′14″N 79°52′10″W
- Country: United States
- State: Pennsylvania
- County: Fayette
- Townships: Luzerne, Redstone

Area
  - Total: 0.68 sq mi (1.75 km^{2})
  - Land: 0.67 sq mi (1.74 km^{2})
  - Water: 0.0039 sq mi (0.01 km^{2})
- Elevation: 980 ft (300 m)

Population (2020)
  - Total: 503
  - Density: 747.3/sq mi (288.52/km^{2})
- Time zone: UTC-5 (Eastern (EST))
  - Summer (DST): UTC-4 (EDT)
- ZIP code: 15413
- FIPS code: 42-02040
- GNIS feature ID: 1192067

Allison is an unincorporated community and census-designated place (CDP), which is located in Luzerne and Redstone townships in Fayette County, Pennsylvania, United States. It is situated 3 miles (5 km) south of the borough of Brownsville.

As of the 2020 census, Allison had a population of 503. The CDP includes the neighborhood of Allison Heights in Luzerne Township.

Dunlap Creek flows through the center of the CDP, forming the border between Luzerne and Redstone townships.

== Demographics ==
Between the time of the 2010 and 2020 federal census counts, the population declined to 503.
