= Dunbar, Pennsylvania =

Borough in Pennsylvania, US

- Borough
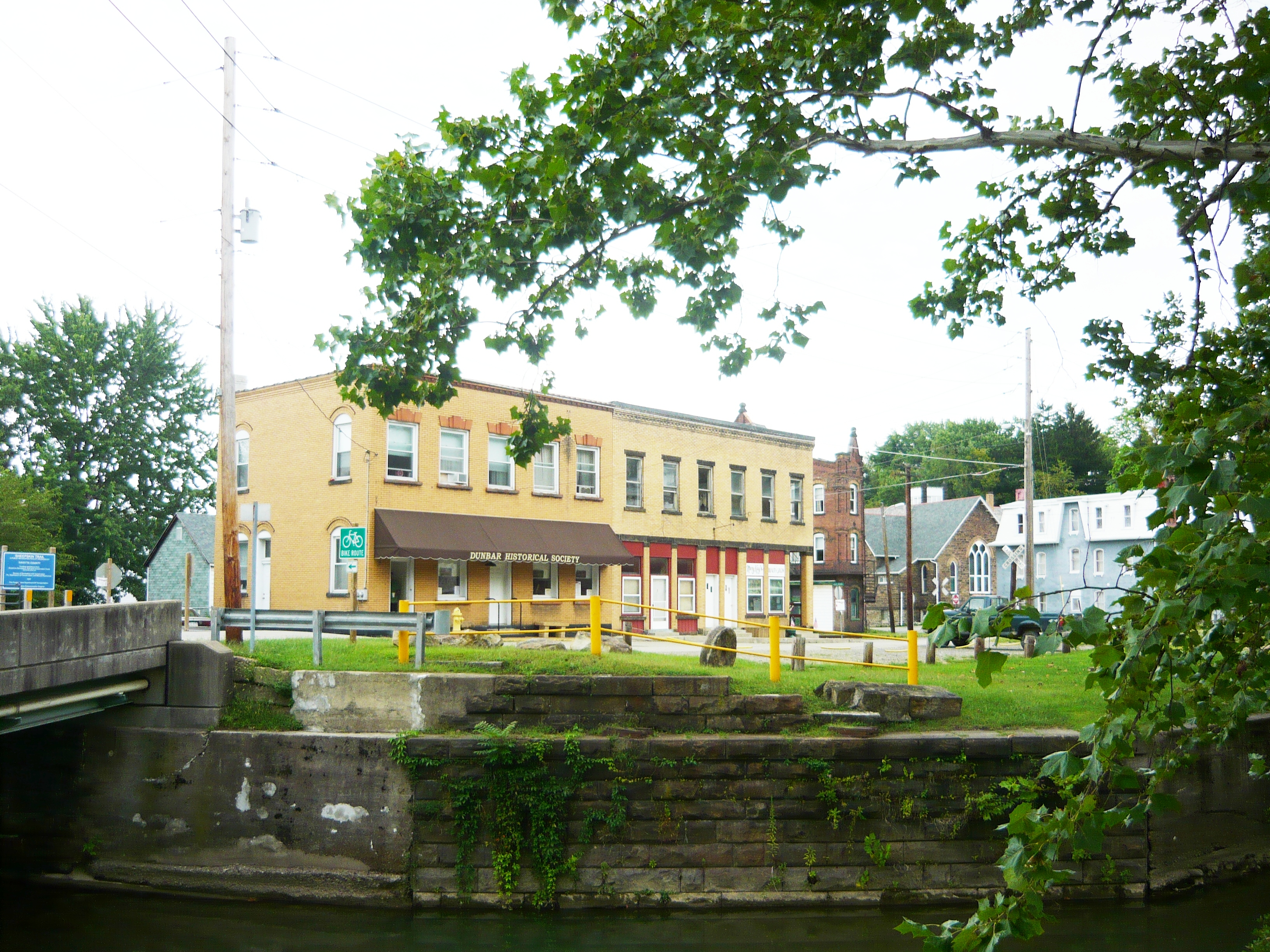
- Dunbar's business district

- Location of Dunbar in Fayette County, Pennsylvania.

- Location of Dunbar in Pennsylvania Dunbar (the United States)
- Coordinates: 39°58′36″N 79°36′53″W
- Country: United States
- State: Pennsylvania
- County: Fayette
- Established: 1857

Government
  - Mayor: Andrew Lee Lowry

Area
  - Total: 0.58 sq mi (1.50 km^{2})
  - Land: 0.58 sq mi (1.50 km^{2})
  - Water: 0 sq mi (0.00 km^{2})

Population (2020)
  - Total: 1,013
  - Density: 1,753.3/sq mi (676.95/km^{2})
- Time zone: UTC-4 (EST)
  - Summer (DST): UTC-5 (EDT)
- ZIP code: 15431
- Area code: 724
- FIPS code: 42-20216
- Website: https://dunbarboropa.gov/

Dunbar is a borough in Fayette County, Pennsylvania, United States. The population was 1,013 at the time of the 2020 census, a decline from the figure of 1,042 tabulated in 2010.

== History ==
Dunbar is named for Col. Thomas Dunbar, who commanded an English force at nearby Jumonville and retreated to Philadelphia after Edward Braddock was defeated by the French and Indians.

Dunbar was originally laid out in 1857, and was incorporated into a borough on June 26, 1883.

== Geography ==
Dunbar is located in north-central Fayette County at 39°58′36″N 79°36′53″W, in the valley of Dunbar Creek, a tributary of the Youghiogheny River. It is 5 miles (8 km) south of Connellsville via Woodvale Street and U.S. Route 119. Uniontown, the county seat, is 8 miles (13 km) to the southwest.

According to the United States Census Bureau, Dunbar has a total area of 0.606638 square miles (1.571185 km^{2}), all land.

== Demographics ==
Historical population
Census	Pop.	Note	%±
1890	1,381		—
1900	1,662		20.3%
1910	1,970		18.5%
1920	1,607		−18.4%
1930	1,357		−15.6%
1940	1,390		2.4%
1950	1,363		−1.9%
1960	1,536		12.7%
1970	1,499		−2.4%
1980	1,369		−8.7%
1990	1,213		−11.4%
2000	1,219		0.5%
2010	1,042		−14.5%
2020	1,013		−2.8%
2021 (est.)	999	▼	−1.4%

As of the 2000 census, there were 1,219 people, 513 households, and 343 families residing in the borough. The population density was 1,879.0 inhabitants per square mile (725.5/km^{2}). There were 576 housing units at an average density of 887.9 per square mile (342.8/km^{2}). The racial makeup of the borough was 99.26% White, 0.41% African American, 0.08% Native American, 0.08% Asian, and 0.16% from two or more races.

There were 513 households, out of which 28.1% had children under the age of 18 living with them, 48.3% were married couples living together, 14.0% had a female householder with no husband present, and 33.1% were non-families. 29.2% of all households were made up of individuals, and 15.2% had someone living alone who was 65 years of age or older. The average household size was 2.36 and the average family size was 2.93.

In the borough the population was spread out, with 22.1% under the age of 18, 8.6% from 18 to 24, 26.9% from 25 to 44, 23.8% from 45 to 64, and 18.6% who were 65 years of age or older. The median age was 40 years. For every 100 females, there were 85.0 males. For every 100 females age 18 and over, there were 83.0 males.

The median income for a household in the borough was $25,718, and the median income for a family was $30,197. Males had a median income of $27,411 versus $18,507 for females. The per capita income for the borough was $14,176. About 5.9% of families and 11.1% of the population were below the poverty line, including 7.1% of those under age 18 and 16.6% of those age 65 or over.
