= Smithfield, Pennsylvania =

Borough in Pennsylvania, US

- Borough
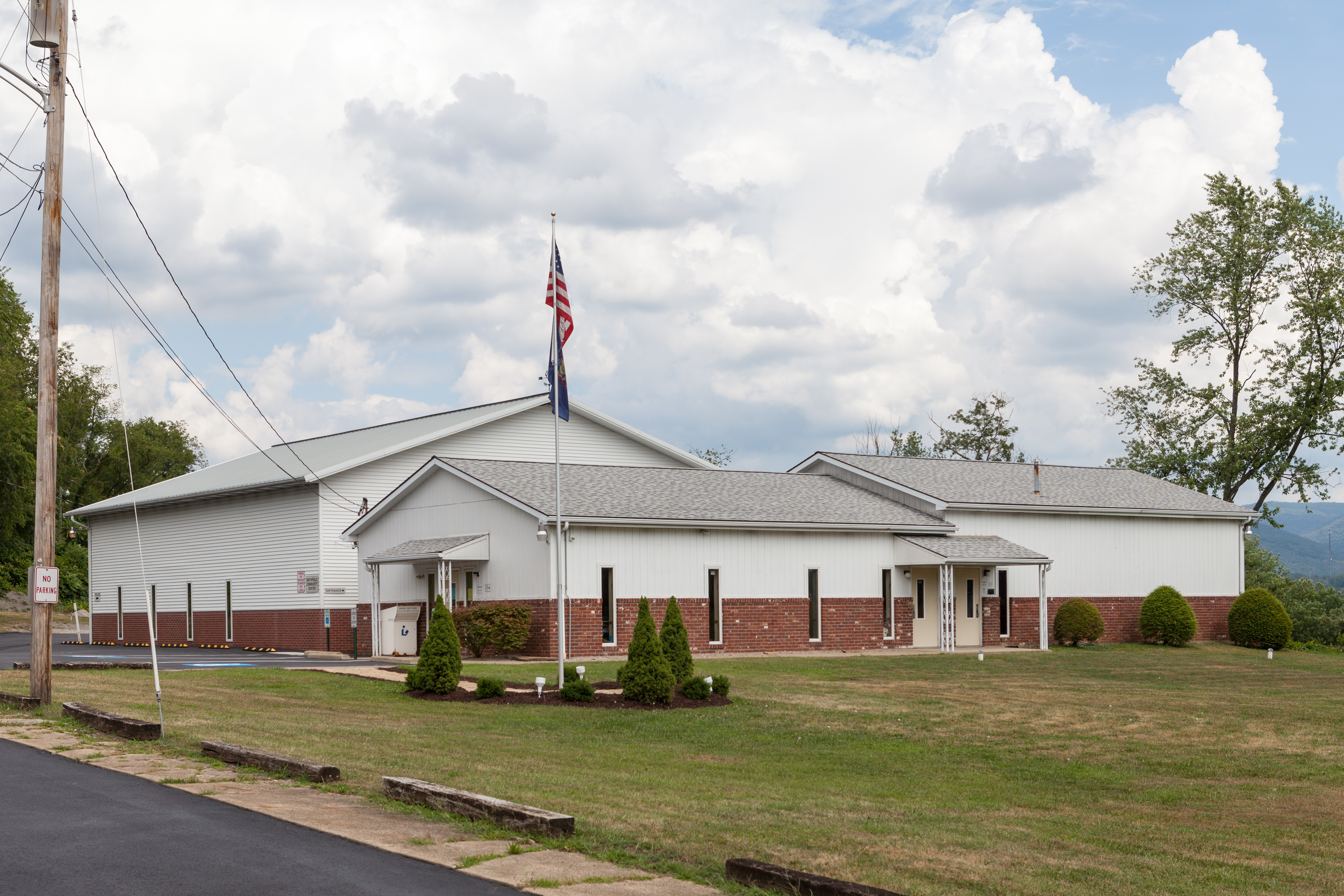

- Location of Smithfield in Fayette County, Pennsylvania.

- Location in Pennsylvania Smithfield (the United States)
- Coordinates: 39°47′59″N 79°48′30″W
- Country: United States
- State: Pennsylvania
- County: Fayette
- Established: 1799

Government
  - Mayor: Jesse Moats

Area
  - Total: 0.71 sq mi (1.85 km^{2})
  - Land: 0.71 sq mi (1.85 km^{2})
  - Water: 0 sq mi (0.00 km^{2})
- Elevation: 1,089 ft (332 m)

Population (2020)
  - Total: 830 ▼
  - Estimate (2021): 817
  - Density: 1,154.7/sq mi (445.84/km^{2})
- Time zone: UTC-4 (EST)
  - Summer (DST): UTC-5 (EDT)
- ZIP code: 15478
- Area code: 724
- FIPS code: 42-71320

Smithfield is a borough in Fayette County, Pennsylvania, United States. The population was 830 at the 2020 census. It is served by the Albert Gallatin Area School District. The town's largest employer is a small wire-producing plant run by Nelson Steel.

== Geography ==
Smithfield is located in southwestern Fayette County at 39°47′59″N 79°48′30″W (39.799664, −79.808197). According to the United States Census Bureau, the borough has a total area of 0.71 square miles (1.84 km^{2}), all land.

U.S. Route 119 passes through the center of the borough, leading northeast 9 miles (14 km) to Uniontown, the county seat, and southwest 8 miles (13 km) to Point Marion.

== Demographics ==
Historical population
Census	Pop.	Note	%±
1900	525		—
1910	749		42.7%
1920	940		25.5%
1930	949		1.0%
1940	996		5.0%
1950	1,066		7.0%
1960	939		−11.9%
1970	969		3.2%
1980	1,084		11.9%
1990	1,000		−7.7%
2000	854		−14.6%
2010	875		2.5%
2020	831		−5.0%
2021 (est.)	817	▼	−1.7%

As of the 2000 census, there were 854 people, 363 households, and 234 families residing in the borough. The population density was 1,196.5 inhabitants per square mile (462.0/km^{2}). There were 384 housing units at an average density of 538.0 per square mile (207.7/km^{2}). The racial makeup of the borough was 99.65% White, 0.23% African American and 0.12% Pacific Islander.

There were 363 households, out of which 26.2% had children under the age of 18 living with them, 52.3% were married couples living together, 10.7% had a female householder with no husband present, and 35.5% were non-families. 32.8% of all households were made up of individuals, and 17.6% had someone living alone who was 65 years of age or older. The average household size was 2.33 and the average family size was 2.99.

In the borough the population was spread out, with 21.4% under the age of 18, 7.0% from 18 to 24, 27.6% from 25 to 44, 23.9% from 45 to 64, and 20.0% who were 65 years of age or older. The median age was 42 years. For every 100 females, there were 86.5 males. For every 100 females age 18 and over, there were 78.9 males.

The median income for a household in the borough was $26,667, and the median income for a family was $35,714. Males had a median income of $25,000 versus $17,404 for females. The per capita income for the borough was $13,618. About 11.7% of families and 14.3% of the population were below the poverty line, including 27.9% of those under age 18 and 9.5% of those age 65 or over.
