= McClellandtown, Pennsylvania =

Unincorporated community in Pennsylvania, United States

- Location within Pennsylvania Location within the United States
- Coordinates: 39°53′13″N 079°52′00″W
- Country: United States
- State: Pennsylvania
- County: Fayette
- Township: German
- Elevation: 1,102 ft (336 m)
- ZIP code: 15458
- Area code: 724

McClellandtown is an unincorporated community in Fayette County, Pennsylvania, United States. The village was formed by a family of that name who resided there many years ago. William McClelland, the founder, died there on July 12, 1815, at the age of 82. The town is located eight miles southwest of Uniontown and 2.5 miles east of the Monongahela River.

McClellandtown has a volunteer fire department and a post office. Additionally, McClellandtown is home to the McClellandtown United Presbyterian Church.
