= Paisley, Pennsylvania =

Unincorporated community in Pennsylvania, US

Coordinates: 39.87375°N 79.9438°W

Paisley is an unincorporated community in Greene County, Pennsylvania, United States.

== History ==
A post office called Paisley was established in 1887, and remained in operation until it was discontinued in 1917. The community may have been named after a local landowner, or named after Paisley, Scotland.
