= Fayette County, Pennsylvania =

County in Pennsylvania, United States

- County
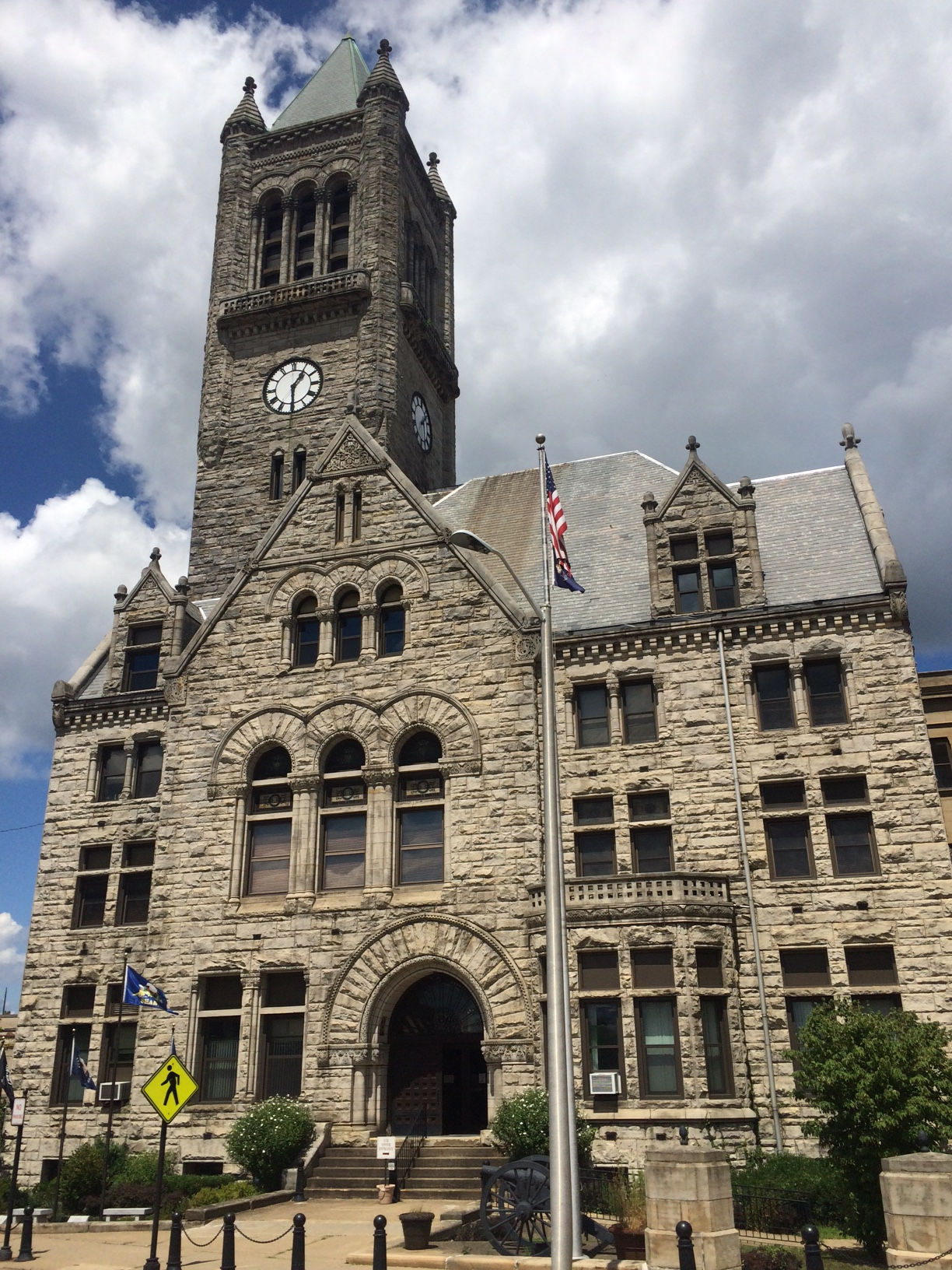
- Fayette County Courthouse

- Flag Seal Logo

- Location within the U.S. state of Pennsylvania
- Coordinates: 39°55′N 79°39′W
- Country: United States
- State: Pennsylvania
- Founded: September 26, 1783
- Named for: Marquis de Lafayette
- Seat: Uniontown
- Largest city: Uniontown

Area
  - Total: 798 sq mi (2,070 km^{2})
  - Land: 790 sq mi (2,000 km^{2})
  - Water: 8.0 sq mi (21 km^{2}) 1.0%

Population (2020)
  - Total: 128,804
  - Estimate (2025): 123,021 ▼
  - Density: 163/sq mi (63/km^{2})
- Time zone: UTC−5 (Eastern)
  - Summer (DST): UTC−4 (EDT)
- Congressional district: 14th
- Website: www.fayettecountypa.org

Fayette County is a county in the Commonwealth of Pennsylvania. It is located in southwestern Pennsylvania, adjacent to Maryland and West Virginia. As of the 2020 census, the population was 128,804. Its county seat is Uniontown. The county was created on September 26, 1783, from part of Westmoreland County and named after the Marquis de Lafayette. The county is part of the Southwest region of the commonwealth. (Note: Includes Westmoreland, Cambria, Fayette, Blair, Indiana, Somerset, Bedford, Huntingdon, Greene and Fulton Counties)

Fayette County is part of the Pittsburgh, PA Metropolitan Statistical Area. The southern border of Fayette County is the southern border of Pennsylvania at both the Pennsylvania–Maryland state line (the Mason–Dixon line) and the Pennsylvania–West Virginia state line.

== History ==
The first Europeans in Fayette County were explorers, who had used an ancient American Indian trail that bisected the county on their journey across the Appalachian Mountains. In 1754, when control of the area was still in dispute between France and Great Britain, 22-year-old George Washington fought against the French at the Battle of Jumonville Glen and Fort Necessity. British forces under Washington and General Edward Braddock improved roads throughout the region, making the future Fayette County an important supply route.

During the Revolutionary War, Fayette County was plagued by attacks by British-allied Indians and remained isolated as a frontier region. Also regarding settlement was a border dispute with Virginia; Virginia's District of West Augusta and Pennsylvania's Westmoreland County both claimed the area. In 1780, the dispute was settled by the federal government in favor of Pennsylvania, and Fayette County was formed from Westmoreland County in 1783.

Fayette County settlers provided the new United States government with an early test of authority in the 1793 Whiskey Rebellion, when farmers rebelled against tax collectors to protest a new liquor tax. President George Washington called out the militias to restore order. However, they were talked out of any violent action by the owner of Friendship Hill and future Secretary of the Treasury, Albert Gallatin. Fayette County continued to be important to travelers in the early 1800s. The National Road provided a route through the mountains of the county for settlers heading west. The shipyards in Brownsville on the Monongahela River built ships for both domestic and international trade.

As Pittsburgh developed its industries in the mid-19th century, Fayette County became a center of coal mining and coke production. From the 1880s to the early 1900s, the area's great expansion in steel production became nationally important, and labor unions shaped national policies. Both new European immigrants and African Americans in the Great Migration from the rural South were attracted to the Pittsburgh area for industrial jobs. The historic Scottish and German farming communities established in the early 19th century were soon overshadowed by the wave of immigrants from Southern and Eastern Europe. The region's wealth has been concentrated largely among the old English and Scottish families who had established businesses and political power in Pittsburgh prior to and in the advent of industrialization, often building new manufacturing concerns, as did Andrew Carnegie.

By World War II, Fayette County had a new unionized working class that enjoyed increased prosperity. In the 1950s, however, the coal industry fell into decline, being called the Coal Bust. In the 1970s, the restructuring and collapse of American steel resulted in a massive loss of industrial jobs and hard times in the area. The population has declined since the peak in 1940, as residents have had to move elsewhere for work. The loss of union jobs caused many working families to drop out of the middle class. Only a few mines are being worked in the 21st century, but natural resources remain crucial to the local economy. The region is slowly transitioning toward the service sector, with an increase in jobs in fields such as telemarketing.

== Geography ==
According to the U.S. Census Bureau, the county has a total area of 798 square miles (2,070 km²), of which 790 square miles (2,000 km²) is land and 8.0 square miles (21 km²) (1.0%) is water. The western portion of the county contains rolling foothills and two valleys along the Monongahela and Youghiogheny rivers. The County relies a large amount on the National Road. The eastern portion of the county is highly mountainous and forested. Many coal mines are located within the area. Fayette County is one of the 423 counties served by the Appalachian Regional Commission, and it is identified as part of "Greater Appalachia" by Colin Woodard in his book American Nations: A History of the Eleven Rival Regional Cultures of North America.

=== Adjacent counties ===
- Westmoreland County (north)
- Somerset County (east)
- Garrett County, Maryland (southeast)
- Preston County, West Virginia (south)
- Monongalia County, West Virginia (southwest)
- Greene County (west)
- Washington County (northwest)

=== Nationally protected areas ===
- Fort Necessity National Battlefield
- Friendship Hill National Historic Site

=== Climate/Ecoregion/Ecosystems ===
Fayette County is located in a humid continental climate (Köppen Dfa/Dfb). Fayette County is centered in the Appalachian mixed mesophytic forests ecoregion with northern hardwood forests confined to the higher elevation northeastern slopes and valleys, oak-hickory forest (formerly oak-chestnut forest) on drier high elevation ridges and mesophytic forests on the rolling lowlands and areas near streams west of the ridges.

Climate data for Uniontown, Pennsylvania (1991-2020; Extremes 1974–present)
Month	Jan	Feb	Mar	Apr	May	Jun	Jul	Aug	Sep	Oct	Nov	Dec	Year
Record high °F (°C)	79 (26)	77 (25)	88 (31)	93 (34)	93 (34)	97 (36)	102 (39)	102 (39)	99 (37)	95 (35)	88 (31)	77 (25)	102 (39)
Mean daily maximum °F (°C)	39 (4)	43 (6)	51 (11)	63 (17)	72 (22)	81 (27)	84 (29)	83 (28)	76 (24)	65 (18)	54 (12)	43 (6)	63 (17)
Daily mean °F (°C)	31 (−1)	33 (1)	42 (6)	53 (12)	62 (17)	70 (21)	73 (23)	72 (22)	65 (18)	54 (12)	45 (7)	35 (2)	53 (12)
Mean daily minimum °F (°C)	20 (−7)	22 (−6)	28 (−2)	37 (3)	46 (8)	56 (13)	60 (16)	59 (15)	51 (11)	40 (4)	32 (0)	24 (−4)	40 (4)
Record low °F (°C)	−22 (−30)	−16 (−27)	−3 (−19)	15 (−9)	23 (−5)	33 (1)	37 (3)	34 (1)	29 (−2)	16 (−9)	−1 (−18)	−14 (−26)	−22 (−30)
Average precipitation inches (mm)	2.8 (71)	2.7 (69)	3.8 (97)	4.0 (100)	4.4 (110)	4.3 (110)	4.8 (120)	3.9 (99)	3.6 (91)	2.9 (74)	3.5 (89)	3.2 (81)	43.9 (1,111)
Average snowfall inches (cm)	8.4 (21)	7.2 (18)	4.6 (12)	0.4 (1.0)	0.0 (0.0)	0.0 (0.0)	0.0 (0.0)	0.0 (0.0)	0.0 (0.0)	0.0 (0.0)	0.9 (2.3)	4.4 (11)	25.9 (65.3)
Source: NWS Pittsburgh - NOWData / XMACIS

== Demographics ==
Historical population
Census	Pop.	Note	%±
1790	13,318		—
1800	20,159		51.4%
1810	24,714		22.6%
1820	27,285		10.4%
1830	29,172		6.9%
1840	33,574		15.1%
1850	39,112		16.5%
1860	39,909		2.0%
1870	43,284		8.5%
1880	58,842		35.9%
1890	80,006		36.0%
1900	110,412		38.0%
1910	167,449		51.7%
1920	188,104		12.3%
1930	198,542		5.5%
1940	200,999		1.2%
1950	189,899		−5.5%
1960	169,340		−10.8%
1970	154,667		−8.7%
1980	159,417		3.1%
1990	145,351		−8.8%
2000	148,645		2.3%
2010	136,606		−8.1%
2020	128,804		−5.7%
2025 (est.)	123,021	▼	−4.5%

=== 2020 census ===
As of the 2020 census, the county had a population of 128,804 and a median age of 46.3 years. 18.7% of residents were under the age of 18 and 22.5% of residents were 65 years of age or older. For every 100 females there were 99.4 males, and for every 100 females age 18 and over there were 97.8 males age 18 and over.

The racial makeup of the county was 89.9% White, 4.5% Black or African American, 0.2% American Indian and Alaska Native, 0.3% Asian, 0.1% Native Hawaiian and Pacific Islander, 0.6% from some other race, and 4.4% from two or more races. Hispanic or Latino residents of any race comprised 1.2% of the population.

44.9% of residents lived in urban areas, while 55.1% lived in rural areas.

There were 54,089 households in the county, of which 24.4% had children under the age of 18 living in them. Of all households, 45.0% were married-couple households, 19.3% were households with a male householder and no spouse or partner present, and 28.0% were households with a female householder and no spouse or partner present. About 30.8% of all households were made up of individuals and 14.9% had someone living alone who was 65 years of age or older.

There were 61,800 housing units, of which 12.5% were vacant. Among occupied housing units, 71.6% were owner-occupied and 28.4% were renter-occupied. The homeowner vacancy rate was 1.5% and the rental vacancy rate was 11.1%.

Fayette County, Pennsylvania – Racial and ethnic composition Note: the US Census treats Hispanic/Latino as an ethnic category. This table excludes Latinos from the racial categories and assigns them to a separate category. Hispanics/Latinos may be of any race.
Race / Ethnicity (NH = Non-Hispanic)	Pop 2000	Pop 2010	Pop 2020	% 2000	% 2010	% 2020
White alone (NH)	141,265	126,888	115,322	95.03%	92.88%	89.53%
Black or African American alone (NH)	5,191	6,270	5,703	3.49%	4.58%	4.42%
Native American or Alaska Native alone (NH)	157	161	166	0.10%	0.11%	0.12%
Asian alone (NH)	316	397	376	0.21%	0.29%	0.29%
Pacific Islander alone (NH)	16	23	160	0.01%	0.01%	0.12%
Other race alone (NH)	116	95	313	0.07%	0.06%	0.24%
Mixed race or Multiracial (NH)	1,019	1,723	5,186	0.68%	1.26%	4.02%
Hispanic or Latino (any race)	564	1,049	1,578	0.37%	0.76%	1.22%
Total	148,644	136,606	128,804	100.00%	100.00%	100.00%

=== 2010 census ===
As of the 2010 census, there were 136,606 people, 59,969 households, and 41,198 families residing in the county. The population density was 188 inhabitants per square mile (73/km²). There were 66,490 housing units at an average density of 84 units per square mile (32/km²). The racial makeup of the county was 93.30% White, 4.71% Black or African American, 0.11% Native American, 0.22% Asian, 0.01% Pacific Islander, 0.11% from other races, and 2.33% from two or more races. 1.38% of the population was Hispanic or Latino of any race. 19.8% were of German, 13.2% Italian, 11.4% Irish, 9.2% American, 8.4% Polish, 7.9% English, and 6.6% Slovak ancestry.

There were 59,969 households, out of which 28.70% had children under the age of 18 living with them, 51.80% were married couples living together, 12.40% had a female householder with no husband present, and 31.30% were non-families. 28.00% of all households were made up of individuals, and 14.50% had someone living alone who was 65 years of age or older. The average household size was 2.43, and the average family size was 2.96.

In the county, 22.70% of the population was under the age of 18, 7.70% was from 18 to 24, 27.20% from 25 to 44, 24.20% from 45 to 64, and 18.10% was 65 years of age or older. The median age was 40 years. For every 100 females, there were 91.80 males. For every 100 females age 18 and over, there were 87.60 males.

== Government ==
The County of Fayette is governed by a three-member publicly elected commission. The three commissioners serve in both executive and legislative capacities. By state law, the commission must have a minority party member, guaranteeing a political split. Each member serves a four-year term. Current commissioners are Democrat Vince Vicites and Republicans Harry Kaufman and Scott Dunn.

In October 2015, Sidney Bush, the first African-American elected to county office, was sworn in as controller. She served briefly before being replaced by Democrat Scott Abraham. Bush became Chief Deputy/Accounts Receivable for the county.

The Fayette County Court of Common Pleas serves as the primary judicial arm in the region. Judges are elected to ten-year terms in accordance with Commonwealth law. Additionally, district judges serve throughout the county and rule on minor offenses. Current judges are President Judge Steve P. Leskinen, Nancy Vernon, Linda Cordaro, Joseph M. George Jr., and Mark Mehalov.

== Politics ==
Once a Democratic stronghold, in the 21st century Fayette County has swung to the Republican Party. The Republican share of the vote has increased in each presidential election since 1992.

United States presidential election results for Fayette County, Pennsylvania
Year	Republican		Democratic		Third party(ies)	
Year	No.	%	No.	%	No.	%
1880	4,920	41.69%	6,250	52.96%	631	5.35%
1884	5,955	45.39%	6,734	51.32%	432	3.29%
1888	7,034	49.17%	6,951	48.59%	321	2.24%
1892	6,859	46.17%	7,508	50.54%	489	3.29%
1896	9,268	51.33%	8,349	46.24%	438	2.43%
1900	9,637	53.54%	7,650	42.50%	712	3.96%
1904	11,486	57.23%	6,792	33.84%	1,793	8.93%
1908	10,012	50.26%	8,220	41.26%	1,689	8.48%
1912	4,168	22.06%	7,363	38.97%	7,361	38.96%
1916	9,838	45.70%	10,416	48.38%	1,275	5.92%
1920	20,186	56.68%	13,358	37.51%	2,067	5.80%
1924	19,064	53.57%	8,855	24.88%	7,668	21.55%
1928	27,693	58.69%	19,063	40.40%	427	0.90%
1932	15,903	35.22%	27,662	61.26%	1,591	3.52%
1936	21,984	30.90%	48,291	67.88%	869	1.22%
1940	23,908	36.16%	41,960	63.47%	246	0.37%
1944	21,945	38.17%	35,093	61.04%	451	0.78%
1948	20,401	36.19%	34,971	62.04%	995	1.77%
1952	27,348	38.12%	43,921	61.22%	476	0.66%
1956	27,857	41.97%	38,312	57.72%	206	0.31%
1960	27,120	39.38%	41,560	60.35%	181	0.26%
1964	16,127	26.20%	45,155	73.35%	276	0.45%
1968	18,921	31.83%	34,340	57.76%	6,189	10.41%
1972	27,288	54.06%	22,475	44.52%	716	1.42%
1976	20,021	37.60%	32,232	60.54%	991	1.86%
1980	19,252	38.99%	27,963	56.62%	2,168	4.39%
1984	21,314	37.69%	35,098	62.07%	135	0.24%
1988	16,915	33.60%	33,098	65.74%	336	0.67%
1992	12,820	23.80%	30,577	56.77%	10,464	19.43%
1996	14,019	30.13%	26,359	56.65%	6,154	13.23%
2000	20,013	40.40%	28,152	56.84%	1,367	2.76%
2004	25,045	45.78%	29,120	53.23%	542	0.99%
2008	26,081	49.35%	25,866	48.95%	897	1.70%
2012	26,018	53.48%	21,971	45.16%	660	1.36%
2016	34,590	63.94%	17,946	33.17%	1,563	2.89%
2020	41,251	66.24%	20,469	32.87%	559	0.90%
2024	43,633	68.67%	19,548	30.76%	362	0.57%

United States Senate election results for Fayette County, Pennsylvania1
Year	Republican		Democratic		Third party(ies)	
Year	No.	%	No.	%	No.	%
1994	14,870	37.76%	23,423	59.47%	1,091	2.77%
2000	19,342	40.52%	27,502	57.62%	886	1.86%
2006	13,484	35.50%	24,495	64.50%	0	0.00%
2012	22,950	47.72%	24,298	50.52%	846	1.76%
2018	20,514	50.40%	19,563	48.06%	628	1.54%
2024	40,804	64.82%	20,752	32.97%	1,389	2.21%

United States Senate election results for Fayette County, Pennsylvania3
Year	Republican		Democratic		Third party(ies)	
Year	No.	%	No.	%	No.	%
1992	21,812	42.40%	27,261	53.00%	2,366	4.60%
1998	13,854	47.92%	13,812	47.77%	1,247	4.31%
2004	21,854	44.24%	23,980	48.55%	3,560	7.21%
2010	16,960	50.19%	16,829	49.81%	0	0.00%
2016	29,699	55.82%	20,547	38.62%	2,958	5.56%
2022	28,234	60.30%	17,731	37.87%	859	1.83%

Pennsylvania Gubernatorial election results for Fayette County
Year	Republican		Democratic		Third party(ies)	
Year	No.	%	No.	%	No.	%
1970	16,109	34.89%	29,234	63.31%	834	1.81%
1974	18,084	43.79%	22,604	54.73%	613	1.48%
1978	13,843	32.70%	28,225	66.67%	269	0.64%
1982	15,791	35.89%	27,739	63.04%	474	1.08%
1986	11,704	30.28%	26,540	68.66%	412	1.07%
1990	5,882	17.00%	28,719	83.00%	0	0.00%
1994	12,710	31.76%	22,497	56.21%	4,816	12.03%
1998	13,215	43.88%	12,863	42.71%	4,041	13.42%
2002	13,878	41.14%	19,082	56.56%	776	2.30%
2006	15,492	40.67%	22,603	59.33%	0	0.00%
2010	18,994	55.70%	15,106	44.30%	0	0.00%
2014	13,129	42.04%	18,102	57.96%	0	0.00%
2018	20,471	50.04%	19,791	48.38%	647	1.58%
2022	26,165	55.82%	20,120	42.92%	592	1.26%

=== Voter registration ===
As of May 4, 2026, there were 79,586 registered voters in Fayette County.

- Republican: 41,290 (51.88%)
- Democratic: 29,629 (37.23%)
- Independent: 6,559 (8.24%)
- Third Party: 2,068 (2.60%)
- Other/Unaccounted: 40 (0.05%)
Chart of Voter Registration
1. Republican (51.9%)
2. Democratic (37.2%)
3. Independent (8.24%)
4. Other Parties (2.60%)
5. Other/Unaccounted (0.05%)

Historically, Fayette County tended to lean strongly to the Democratic Party in statewide and national elections due to a strong union history, as county residents tend to be liberal on economic issues. At the presidential level, the Democratic candidate won by over 15 percentage points in every election from 1932 through 2004, except for 1972, when it was carried by Republican Richard Nixon in his landslide re-election.

However, similar to much of the rest of Western Pennsylvania outside of Pittsburgh and Erie, most residents tend to be socially conservative, and the county has been trending towards the Republican Party since 1996. In the past eight presidential elections, the Republican nominee has gained increasing support in each successive election, and the county was one of only 41 counties nationwide to flip from Democratic to Republican in 2008. Despite losing nationwide and statewide by a large margin, John McCain became the first Republican since 1972 and only the second Republican since 1928 to win Fayette County in 2008, and four years later, Mitt Romney became only the second Republican since 1928 to win a majority of the county's vote. In 2016, Republican Donald Trump won the county by a massive margin of 31 points (64% to 33%), becoming the first Republican to win the county by double digits since 1928, as well as the first Republican to receive over 60% of the county's vote in history. Four years later, he improved on his margin, winning 66.4-32.9. The county has also become solidly Republican in non-presidential races, with Republicans Lou Barletta and Scott Wagner carrying the county in the 2018 Senate and gubernatorial races, respectively, despite both losing statewide by margins of over 10 points.

=== State representatives ===
Serve 2 year terms in Pennsylvania House of Representatives

- Charity Grimm Krupa, Republican, 51st District, since 2023
- Ryan Warner, Republican, 52nd District, since 2015

=== State senator ===
- Pat Stefano, Republican, 32nd district serves 4-year term in Pennsylvania Senate, since 2015.

=== U.S. representative ===
- Guy Reschenthaler, Republican (14th district), since 2019.

=== U.S. senators ===
Serves six year terms in U.S. Senate

- John Fetterman, Democratic, since 2023
- Dave McCormick, Republican, since 2025

== Education ==
=== Colleges and universities ===
- Penn State Fayette, The Eberly Campus, is a Commonwealth Campus of the Pennsylvania State University system located in Lemont Furnace. Penn State Fayette is the only four-year (bachelor's) degree-granting institution in Fayette County and is slated for closure after the Spring 2027 semester. For students and residents seeking to remain within the immediate vicinity of the county to pursue higher education, PennWest California serves as the nearest regional alternative, situated just a short drive away via PA-88, US-40, and PA Turnpike 43.

=== Public school districts ===
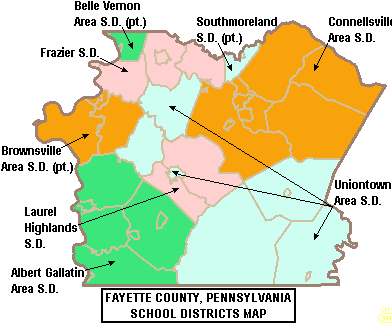
Map of Fayette County, Pennsylvania School Districts

School districts include:

- Albert Gallatin Area School District (serves southwestern corner of Fayette county)
- Belle Vernon Area School District (also in Westmoreland County)
- Brownsville Area School District (also in Washington County)
- Connellsville Area School District (biggest school district in Fayette County, serves northeastern corner of the county)
- Frazier School District (serves Perryopolis and surrounding area)
- Laurel Highlands School District (serves North and South Union Townships)
- Southmoreland School District (also in Westmoreland County)
- Uniontown Area School District (serves Uniontown, Franklin and Menallen Townships, and the mountainous southeastern corner of Fayette County)

=== Private schools ===
- Apostolic Christian Academy - Dunbar
- Bible Baptist Academy - Uniontown
- Calvary Chapel Christian School - Brownsville
- Champion Christian School - Champion
- Chestnut Ridge Christian Academy - Uniontown
- Connellsville Area Catholic School - Connellsville
- Geibel Catholic High School - Connellsville
- Mount Carmel Christian School - Mount Pleasant
- Mount Moriah Christian School - Smithfield
- Mount Zion Christian Academy - Acme
- New Meadow Run Parochial School - Farmington
- Spring Valley School - Farmington
- St John Evangelist School - Uniontown
- Verna Montessori School - Prittstown

=== Intermediate unit ===
Fayette County is served by Intermediate Unit #1, which provides a wide variety of services to public, charter, and private schools in the region. Early screening, special education services, speech and hearing therapy, and driver education are available. Services for children during the preschool years are provided without cost to their families when the child is determined to meet eligibility requirements. The IU1 also provides the state-mandated multiple background screenings for potential school employees. A variety of professional development services are also available to the schools' employees.

== Transportation ==
While Fayette County is a generally rural area and is not directly tied into the interstate system, it features four-lane access to the city of Pittsburgh and several of its major suburban areas. State highway plans call for the establishment of direct freeway connections with Pittsburgh to the north and Morgantown, West Virginia, to the south.

=== Major highways ===
- US 40
- US 40 Bus.
- US 119
- PA 21
- PA Turnpike 43
- PA 51
- PA 166
- PA 201
- PA 281
- PA 381
- PA 653
- PA 711
- PA 711 Truck
- PA 819
- PA 857
- PA 982

=== Public transportation ===
The primary provider of mass transportation within the region is Fayette Area Coordinated Transportation, which features local bus routes as well as four-time daily commuter service to Pittsburgh. Amtrak rail service along the Chicago-to-Washington-via-Cleveland Capitol Limited route stops at Connellsville Station. General aviation services are also provided at the Joseph A. Hardy Connellsville Airport.

== Communities ==
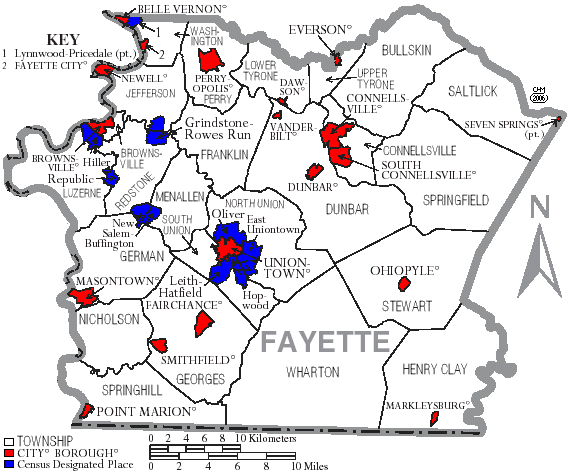
Map of Fayette County, Pennsylvania with Municipal Labels showing Cities and Boroughs (red), Townships (white), and Census-designated places (blue).

Under Pennsylvania law, there are four types of incorporated municipalities: cities, boroughs, townships, and, in at most two cases, towns. The following cities, boroughs, and townships are located in Fayette County:

=== Cities ===
- Connellsville
- Uniontown (county seat)

=== Boroughs ===
- Belle Vernon
- Brownsville
- Dawson
- Dunbar
- Everson
- Fairchance
- Fayette City
- Markleysburg
- Masontown
- Newell
- Ohiopyle
- Perryopolis
- Point Marion
- Seven Springs (partly in Somerset County)
- Smithfield
- South Connellsville
- Vanderbilt

=== Former Boroughs ===
There have been two former boroughs in Fayette County, South Brownsville and New Haven. South Brownsville was originally founded with the name Bridgeport on May 10, 1814, but the name changed to South Brownsville on June 5, 1908. South Brownsville joined Brownsville on July 3, 1933, which more than doubled the borough's size. New Haven was founded on June 11, 1839, and joined Connellsville (which was a borough at the time) on February 25, 1909. Less than five years later, Connellsville became a city on December 1, 1913.

=== Townships ===
- Brownsville
- Bullskin
- Connellsville
- Dunbar
- Franklin
- Georges
- German
- Henry Clay
- Jefferson
- Lower Tyrone
- Luzerne
- Menallen
- Nicholson
- North Union
- Perry
- Redstone
- Saltlick
- South Union
- Springfield
- Springhill
- Stewart
- Upper Tyrone
- Washington
- Wharton

=== Census-designated places ===
Census-designated places are geographical areas designated by the U.S. Census Bureau for the purposes of compiling demographic data. They are not actual jurisdictions under Pennsylvania law. Other unincorporated communities, such as villages, may be listed here as well.

- Allison
- Arnold City
- Bear Rocks
- Buffington
- Chalkhill
- Deer Lake
- East Uniontown
- Edenborn
- Fairhope
- Farmington
- Grindstone
- Hiller
- Hopwood
- Leith-Hatfield
- Lemont Furnace
- Lynnwood-Pricedale
- Naomi
- New Salem
- Oliver
- Republic
- Ronco
- Rowes Run
- Smock
- South Uniontown
- Star Junction

=== Unincorporated communities ===
- Acme
- Adah
- Bitner
- Collier
- Fairbank
- Footedale
- Gans
- Hibbs
- Lake Lynn
- Lamberton
- Leckrone
- Leisenring
- McClellandtown
- Melcroft
- Normalville, (originally named Elm)
- Oliphant Furnace
- Ralph
- Sagamore
- West Leisenring
- Whitsett
- Wickhaven

=== Population ranking ===
The population ranking of the following table is based on the 2020 census of Fayette County.

† county seat

Rank	City/Town/etc.	Municipal type	Population (2020 Census)
1	† Uniontown	City	9,984
2	Connellsville	City	7,031
3	Masontown	Borough	3,276
4	Leith-Hatfield	CDP	2,672
5	Oliver	CDP	2,538
6	East Uniontown	CDP	2,271
7	Brownsville	Borough	2,185
8	Hopwood	CDP	2,062
9	Lynnwood-Pricedale (partially in Westmoreland County)	CDP	2,074
10	Fairchance	Borough	1,890
11	South Connellsville	Borough	1,917
12	Perryopolis	Borough	1,705
13	South Uniontown	CDP	1,325
14	Point Marion	Borough	1,156
15	Hiller	CDP	1,258
16	Fairhope	CDP	1,146
17	Republic	CDP	1,151
18	Belle Vernon	Borough	1,024
19	Bear Rocks	CDP	1,005
20	Dunbar	Borough	1,013
21	Smithfield	Borough	831
22	Lemont Furnace	CDP	715
23	Everson	Borough	771
24	Farmington	CDP	735
25	Allison	CDP	503
26	Star Junction	CDP	518
27	Fayette City	Borough	502
28	Smock	CDP	549
29	New Salem	CDP	499
30	Rowes Run	CDP	517
31	Newell	Borough	513
T-32	Arnold City	CDP	462
T-32	Grindstone	CDP	489
33	Deer Lake	CDP	482
34	Vanderbilt	Borough	419
35	Dawson	Borough	352
36	Edenborn	CDP	229
37	Buffington	CDP	298
38	Markleysburg	Borough	246
39	Ronco	CDP	209
40	Chalkhill	CDP	127
41	Naomi	CDP	53
42	Ohiopyle	Borough	37
43	Seven Springs (mostly in Somerset County)	Borough	26

== Fixtures ==
- Fort Necessity is a reconstructed historic stockade that was originally built by George Washington to defend against an attack during the French and Indian War. Located in Wharton Township, it is now operating as a national battlefield.
  - General Edward Braddock's Grave is across the highway from Fort Necessity. He was mortally wounded while attacking Fort Duquesne (at the "forks of the Ohio River" in present-day Downtown Pittsburgh) during the French and Indian War. It is a unit of the national battlefield. Under an agreement with the British government, the site of Braddock's grave is officially considered British soil.
- The National Road (also known as the Cumberland Road) bisects Fayette County. It was the first significant roadway to be paid for by the federal government, connecting Baltimore, Maryland, to Vandalia, Illinois. US 40 follows the path of this historic toll road.
  - Two historic fixtures from the National Road exist within Fayette County's borders. Searights Toll House in Menallen Township is one of the few remaining toll collection stops along the old route. The Washington Tavern, a unit of Fort Necessity National Battlefield, is a classic example of an early 19th-century inn.
- The town of Perryopolis was designed by George Washington during his career as a surveyor. It includes a restored grist mill that once served as an (unsuccessful) business venture for the future president.
- Fallingwater, architect Frank Lloyd Wright's most famous home, is located atop a flowing waterfall in Stewart Township. His lesser-known Kentuck Knob is also located within the same municipality.
- Friendship Hill, the home of the little-known but highly influential early-19th-century political figure Albert Gallatin, is maintained as a National Historic Site. It is located in Springhill Township.
- Fayette County's southern border is adorned with plaques that mark its significance as part of the Mason–Dixon line.
- A collection of waterfalls surrounding the Youghiogheny River Gorge are protected as part of Ohiopyle State Park.
- Laurel Ridge State Park contains an extensive hiking trail that traverses much of Pennsylvania's Appalachian foothills.
- The county contains the largest cave in Pennsylvania, Laurel Caverns, which is popular as both a tour and spelunking destination.
- A historic trading post that eventually was turned into a spectacular mansion is featured in Nemacolin Castle. The structure is well known for its connections to the Underground Railroad.
- The prestigious Nemacolin Woodlands Resort is located in Wharton Township. It features a five-star hotel and has received a license for a slots casino.
- Mountainous Eastern Fayette County is home to the Seven Springs Mountain Resort, which is the premier skiing destination for Greater Pittsburgh.

== Notable people ==
- Bob Bailor, former MLB utility player (raised in Connellsville)
- John A. Brashear, astronomer and optical telescope fabricator (born in Brownsville)
- Jim Braxton, All-American at West Virginia University and former NFL running back (raised in Vanderbilt)
- John Dickson Carr, mystery writer and three-time Edgar Allan Poe Award winner (raised in Uniontown)
- Rhoda Chase, well-known 1940s radio and stage personality, nicknamed "The Blue Velvet Voice" (raised in Uniontown)
- Todd Tamanend Clark, poet and composer (resides in German Township since 1993)
- Robert L. Coble, a materials scientist who discovered the Coble creep and invented the sodium-vapor lamp (raised in Uniontown)
- Sarah B. Cochran, active philanthropist, director on multiple corporate boards, and builder of Linden Hall (raised in Tyrone Township)
- Vinnie Colaiuta, session and band drummer for a wide range of jazz, fusion, rock, and funk performers (raised in Republic)
- Major Coxson, drug kingpin in Philadelphia in the early 1970s (born in Fairbanks)
- Doug Dascenzo, former Major League Baseball outfielder (raised in Brownsville)
- Ernie Davis, 1961 Heisman Trophy winner and first overall selection in the 1962 NFL draft (raised in New Salem until age 12)
- Thomas Dolinay, former chief bishop of the Byzantine Catholic Metropolitan Church (raised in Uniontown)
- Chuck Drazenovich, All-Pro Middle Linebacker for the Washington Redskins and U.S. Heavyweight Boxing Champion for Penn State (raised in West Brownsville)
- Tory Epps, former NFL defensive lineman (raised in Uniontown)
- Mark Esper, former US Secretary of Defense, former US Secretary of the Army (raised in Uniontown)
- Fabian Forte, 1960s pop musician (resides in Dunbar Township)
- Albert Gallatin, Secretary of the Treasury, U.S. House Majority Leader, and founder of New York University (spent much of his adult life in New Geneva, which he founded and named)
- Gus Gerard, former NBA forward (raised in Uniontown)
- Joe Hardy, founder of 84 Lumber, one of the country's largest privately owned companies (resided in Wharton Township)
- Alfred Hunt, founder of Bethlehem Steel (born and raised in Brownsville)
- Dorian Johnson, All-American for the University of Pittsburgh (born in Belle Vernon)
- Philander C. Knox, Secretary of State, U.S. Senator, and U.S. Attorney General (raised in Brownsville)
- John Kundla, educator, college/professional basketball coach (born in Star Junction)
- Stu Lantz, former NBA guard and current Los Angeles Lakers color commentator (raised in Uniontown)
- Johnny Lujack, 1947 Heisman Trophy winner and former NFL quarterback (raised in Connellsville)
- George C. Marshall, 1953 Nobel Peace Prize Winner, Secretary of State, World War II Supreme Allied Commander, and author of the Marshall Plan (raised in Uniontown)
- Jerry McKenna, sculptor (born in Connellsville)
- Terry Mulholland, former MLB starting pitcher (raised in South Union Township)
- Chuck Muncie, former NFL running back (raised in Uniontown)
- Marie Hochmuth Nichols, rhetorical critic (born in Dunbar)
- Ronald D. Palmer, career diplomat and US Ambassador to Togo, Malaysia, and Mauritius (raised in Uniontown)
- Tamora Pierce, fantasy writer known for creating The Song of the Lioness series (raised in Dunbar until age 8)
- Edwin S. Porter, film pioneer and director of The Great Train Robbery (raised in Connellsville)
- Ed Roebuck, former MLB relief pitcher (raised in East Millsboro)
- Henry Miller Shreve, pioneering captain who opened the Mississippi River to steamboat navigation (lived life in Brownsville)
- C. Vivian Stringer, Rutgers women's basketball coach who is the third winningest women's coach in NCAA history (raised in Edenborn)
- Jacob B. Sweitzer, Civil War general and significant figure in the Battle of Gettysburg (born in Brownsville)
- Saul Swimmer, documentary filmmaker best known for The Concert For Bangladesh; co-producer of The Beatles' Let It Be (raised in Uniontown)
- John Woodruff, track gold medalist at the 1936 Summer Olympics (raised in Connellsville)
- Frank Wydo, former NFL offensive tackle (raised in Footedale)

== In popular culture ==
In 1967 Uniontown was the birthplace of the McDonald's Big Mac sandwich.

== See also ==
- National Register of Historic Places listings in Fayette County, Pennsylvania
- John Hopwood
