= Republic, Pennsylvania =

Unincorporated community in Pennsylvania, US

- Census-designated place
- Main Street in 2026

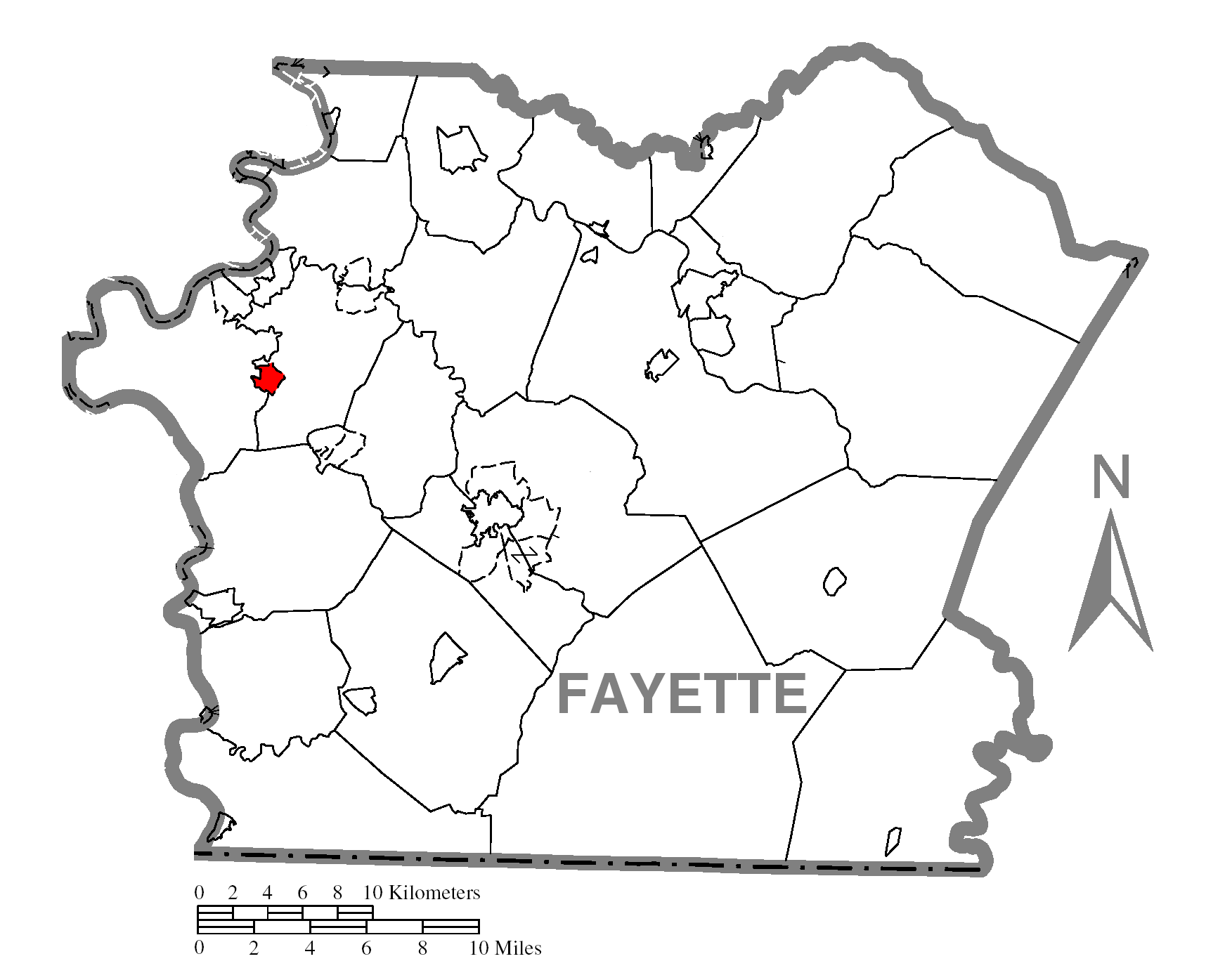
- Location of Republic in Fayette County
- Coordinates: 39°57′56″N 79°52′41″W
- Country: United States
- State: Pennsylvania
- County: Fayette
- Township: Redstone

Area
  - Total: 0.73 sq mi (1.88 km^{2})
  - Land: 0.73 sq mi (1.88 km^{2})
  - Water: 0 sq mi (0.00 km^{2})

Population (2020)
  - Total: 1,151
  - Density: 1,582.3/sq mi (610.92/km^{2})
- Time zone: UTC-4 (EST)
  - Summer (DST): UTC-5 (EDT)
- ZIP code: 15475
- Area codes: 724, 878
- FIPS code: 42-64224

Republic is an unincorporated community and census-designated place (CDP) in Fayette County, Pennsylvania, United States. The population was 1,096 at the 2010 census, down from 1,396 at the 2000 census. The community is in Redstone Township.

== Geography ==
Republic is located in western Fayette County at 39°57′56″N 79°52′41″W (39.965531, −79.878064), on the western edge of Redstone Township. It is bordered to the west across Dunlap Creek by Luzerne Township.

Pennsylvania Route 166 passes through Republic, leading north 5 miles (8 km) to Brownsville and south 6 miles (10 km) to Edenborn. Pennsylvania Route 43, the Mon–Fayette Expressway, passes 3 miles (5 km) north of Republic, with access from Exit 22.

According to the United States Census Bureau, the CDP has a total area of 0.73 square miles (1.9 km^{2}), all land.

== Demographics ==
Historical population
Census	Pop.	Note	%±
2020	1,151		—
U.S. Decennial Census

As of the 2000 census, there were 1,396 people, 614 households, and 359 families residing in the CDP. The population density was 1,887.4 inhabitants per square mile (728.7/km^{2}). There were 714 housing units at an average density of 965.3 per square mile (372.7/km^{2}). The racial makeup of the CDP was 90.47% White, 7.02% African American, 0.29% Native American, 0.36% from other races, and 1.86% from two or more races. Hispanic or Latino of any race were 0.43% of the population.

There were 614 households, out of which 24.8% had children under the age of 18 living with them, 38.9% were married couples living together, 15.0% had a female householder with no husband present, and 41.5% were non-families. 37.6% of all households were made up of individuals, and 22.6% had someone living alone who was 65 years of age or older. The average household size was 2.27 and the average family size was 3.03.

In the CDP, the population was spread out, with 23.4% under the age of 18, 7.8% from 18 to 24, 25.6% from 25 to 44, 21.7% from 45 to 64, and 21.5% who were 65 years of age or older. The median age was 40 years. For every 100 females, there were 82.7 males. For every 100 females age 18 and over, there were 83.0 males.

The median income for a household in the CDP was $20,598, and the median income for a family was $26,411. Males had a median income of $37,813 versus $19,653 for females. The per capita income for the CDP was $14,201. About 20.4% of families and 22.9% of the population were below the poverty line, including 28.4% of those under age 18 and 14.2% of those age 65 or over.

== Notable person ==
- Vinnie Colaiuta, session drummer and soloist; raised in Republic
