= Masontown, Pennsylvania =

Borough in Pennsylvania, United States

- Borough
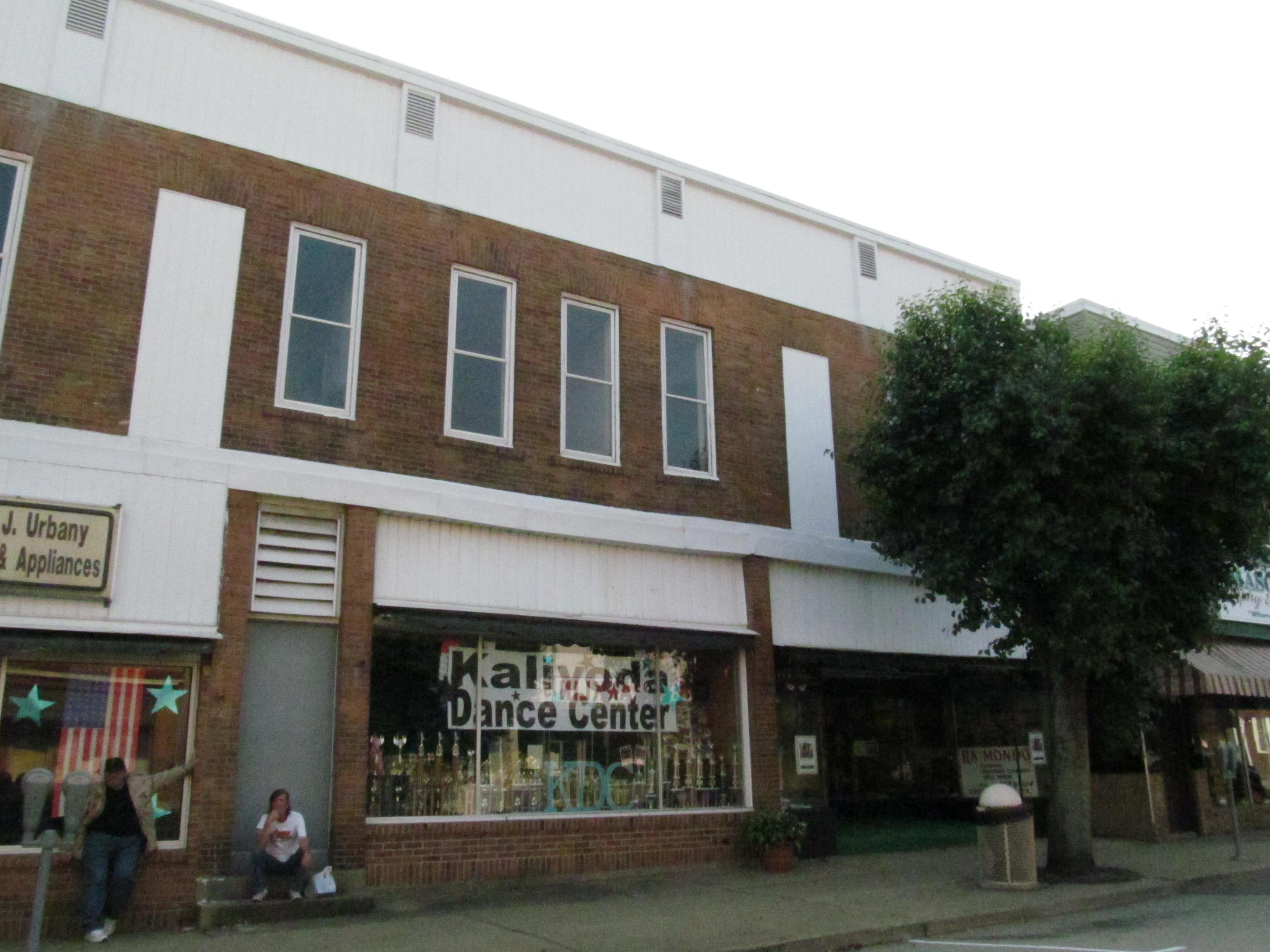

- Seal
- Etymology: John and Abigail Mason
- Location of Masontown in Fayette County, Pennsylvania.

- Location in Pennsylvania Masontown (the United States)
- Coordinates: 39°50′46″N 79°54′13″W
- Country: United States
- State: Pennsylvania
- County: Fayette
- Established: 1798

Government
  - Mayor: Mike Washko
  - Council President: John Stoffa
  - Council Vice President: Sam Chahl

Area
  - Total: 1.53 sq mi (3.95 km^{2})
  - Land: 1.49 sq mi (3.87 km^{2})
  - Water: 0.031 sq mi (0.08 km^{2})
- Elevation: 1,020 ft (310 m)

Population (2020)
  - Total: 3,276
  - Density: 2,191.8/sq mi (846.24/km^{2})
- Time zone: UTC-4 (EST)
  - Summer (DST): UTC-5 (EDT)
- ZIP code: 15461
- Area code: 724
- FIPS code: 42-48000
- Website: masontownpa.com

Masontown is a borough in Fayette County, Pennsylvania, United States. It is part of the Pittsburgh Metro Area. The population of the borough was 3,274 at the 2020 census. It is served by the Albert Gallatin Area School District. Masontown is a small crossroads for the rural portions of western Fayette County, and it contains a small shopping center and a grocery store within its business district.

== History ==
Fort Mason was built as a blockhouse from 1774 to 1778 by John Mason, also known as Johannes Phillip Maurer (1730–1812). Masontown became a town in 1798. He later moved to Ohio and is buried on a family farm in Columbiana County.

== Geography ==
Masontown is located in southwestern Fayette County at 39°50′46″N 79°54′13″W (39.846228, −79.903492). The borough's western border is the Monongahela River, which forms the Greene County line, but the main settled part of the borough is 1 mile (1.6 km) east of and 200 feet (60 m) higher than the river.

Pennsylvania Route 21 passes through the northern and western part of the borough, leading east 12 miles (19 km) to Uniontown, the Fayette county seat, and west across the Monongahela 16 miles (26 km) to Waynesburg. Pennsylvania Route 166 passes through the center of Masontown as Main Street and leads south 10 miles (16 km) to Point Marion at the confluence of the Monongahela and Cheat rivers.

According to the United States Census Bureau, Masontown has a total area of 1.54 square miles (4.00 km^{2}), of which 1.51 square miles (3.91 km^{2}) is land and 0.03 square miles (0.08 km^{2}), or 2.10%, is water.

== Demographics ==
Historical population
Census	Pop.	Note	%±
1880	376		—
1890	391		4.0%
1900	466		19.2%
1910	890		91.0%
1920	1,525		71.3%
1930	3,873		154.0%
1940	3,721		−3.9%
1950	4,550		22.3%
1960	4,730		4.0%
1970	4,226		−10.7%
1980	4,909		16.2%
1990	3,759		−23.4%
2000	3,611		−3.9%
2010	3,450		−4.5%
2020	3,276		−5.0%
2021 (est.)	3,228	▼	−1.5%

=== 2020 census ===
As of the 2020 census, Masontown had a population of 3,276. The median age was 42.6 years. 20.6% of residents were under the age of 18 and 20.5% of residents were 65 years of age or older. For every 100 females there were 95.8 males, and for every 100 females age 18 and over there were 94.8 males age 18 and over.

0.0% of residents lived in urban areas, while 100.0% lived in rural areas.

There were 1,414 households in Masontown, of which 27.1% had children under the age of 18 living in them. Of all households, 41.5% were married-couple households, 19.2% were households with a male householder and no spouse or partner present, and 29.4% were households with a female householder and no spouse or partner present. About 30.1% of all households were made up of individuals and 15.7% had someone living alone who was 65 years of age or older.

There were 1,606 housing units, of which 12.0% were vacant. The homeowner vacancy rate was 1.1% and the rental vacancy rate was 11.2%.

Racial composition as of the 2020 census
Race	Number	Percent
White	2,864	87.4%
Black or African American	159	4.9%
American Indian and Alaska Native	13	0.4%
Asian	14	0.4%
Native Hawaiian and Other Pacific Islander	3	0.1%
Some other race	15	0.5%
Two or more races	208	6.3%
Hispanic or Latino (of any race)	24	0.7%

=== 2000 census ===
As of the 2000 census, there were 3,611 people, 1,536 households, and 984 families residing in the borough. The population density was 2,376.6 inhabitants per square mile (917.6/km^{2}). There were 1,701 housing units at an average density of 1,119.5 per square mile (432.2/km^{2}). The racial makeup of the borough was 93.27% White, 5.59% African American, 0.22% Native American, 0.03% Asian, 0.30% from other races, and 0.58% from two or more races. Hispanic or Latino of any race were 0.22% of the population.

There were 1,536 households, out of which 27.6% had children under the age of 18 living with them, 44.5% were married couples living together, 15.8% had a female householder with no husband present, and 35.9% were non-families. 33.1% of all households were made up of individuals, and 20.4% had someone living alone who was 65 years of age or older. The average household size was 2.32 and the average family size was 2.90.

In the borough the population was spread out, with 23.0% under the age of 18, 7.8% from 18 to 24, 23.2% from 25 to 44, 23.1% from 45 to 64, and 22.9% who were 65 years of age or older. The median age was 42 years. For every 100 females, there were 83.1 males. For every 100 females age 18 and over, there were 77.2 males.

The median income for a household in the borough was $24,049, and the median income for a family was $27,609. Males had a median income of $35,948 versus $18,194 for females. The per capita income for the borough was $13,875. About 19.7% of families and 25.2% of the population were below the poverty line, including 37.2% of those under age 18 and 16.6% of those age 65 or over.

== Notable people ==
- Frank L. Bowman, congressman from West Virginia
- Mike Nixon, longtime Pittsburgh Steelers coach and scout

== Gallery ==
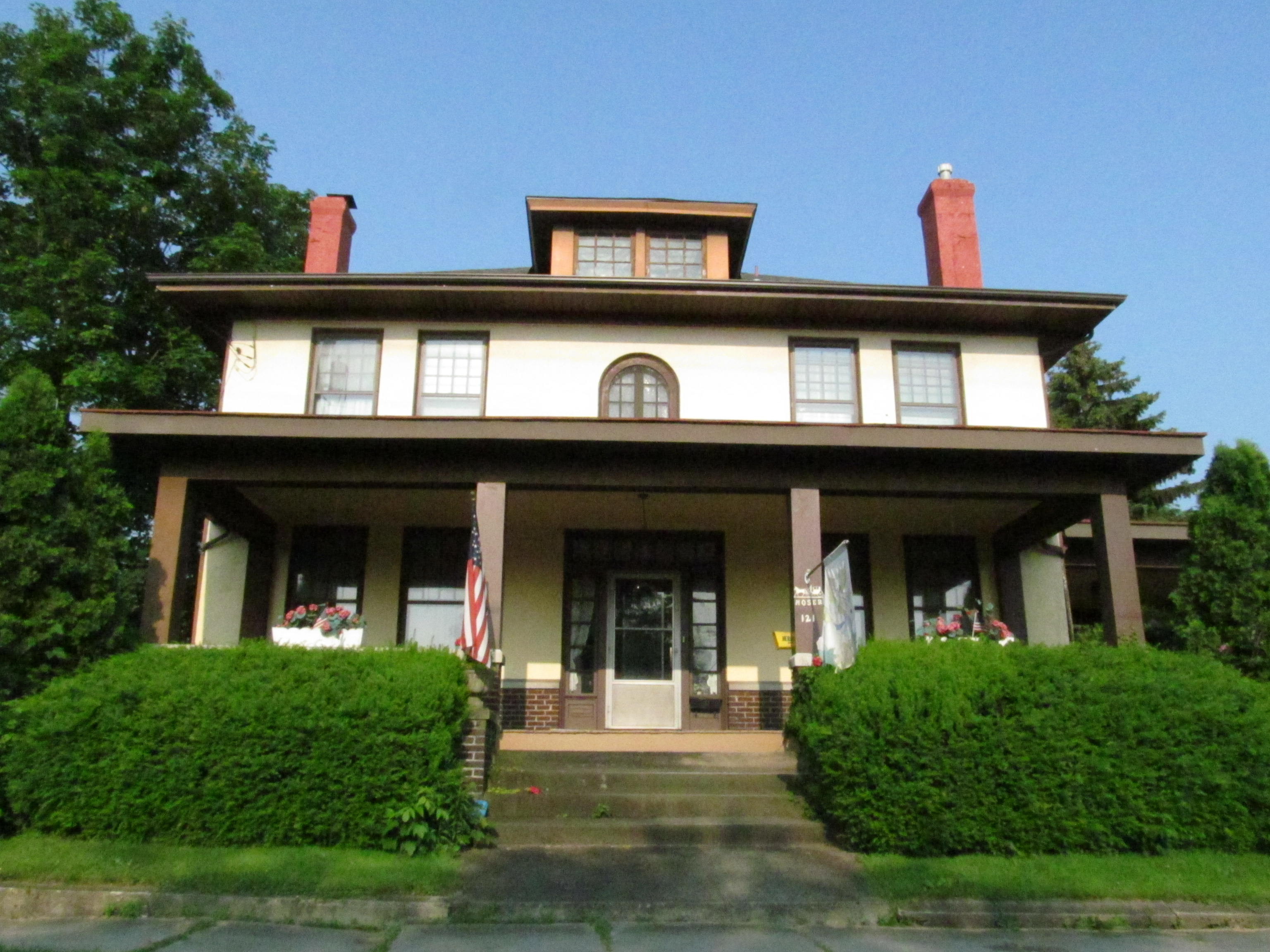

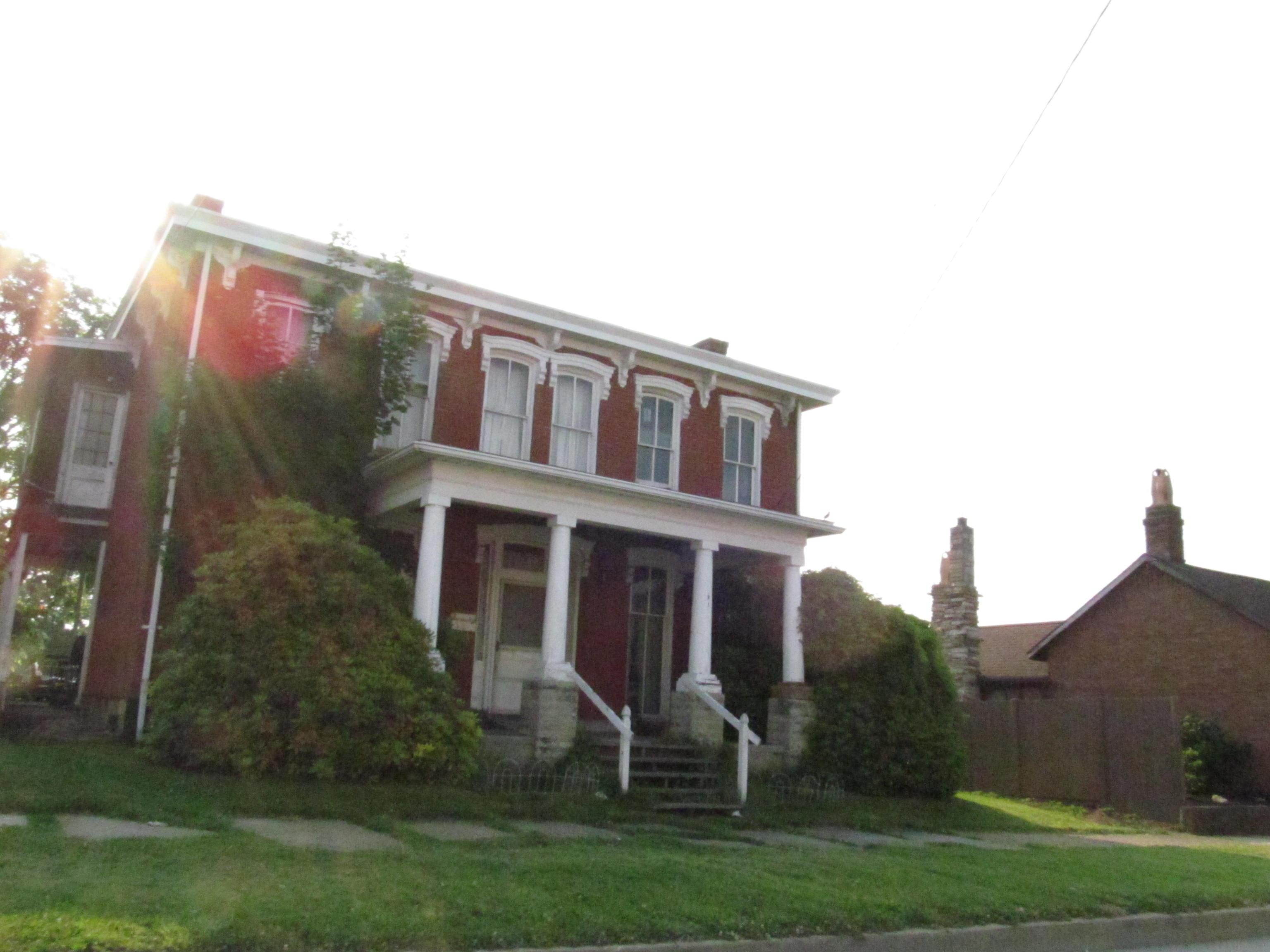

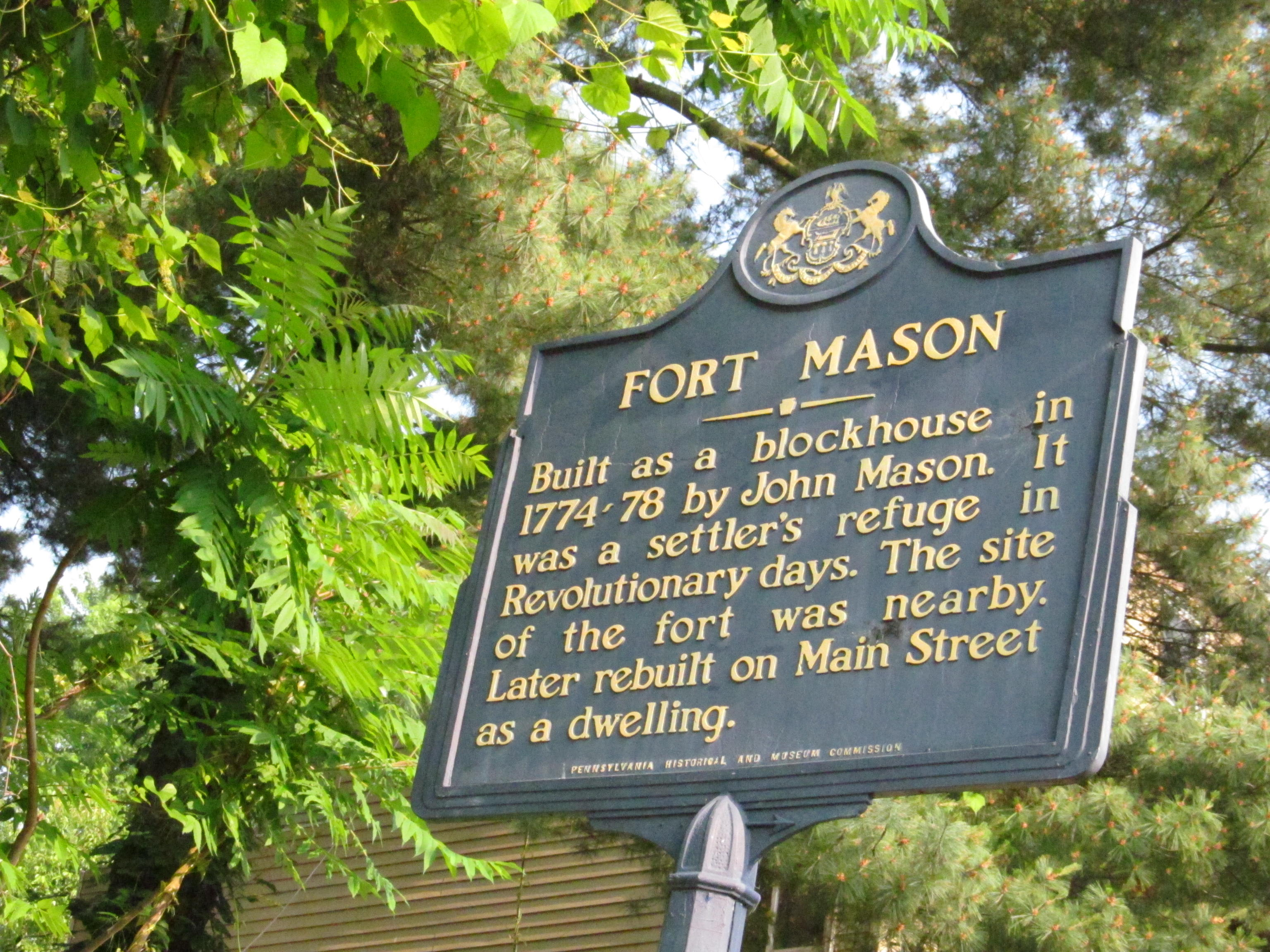
