= National Register of Historic Places listings in Fayette County, Pennsylvania =

Location of Fayette County in Pennsylvania

This is a list of the National Register of Historic Places listings in Fayette County, Pennsylvania.

This is intended to be a complete list of the properties and districts on the National Register of Historic Places in Fayette County, Pennsylvania, United States. The locations of National Register properties and districts for which the latitude and longitude coordinates are included below, may be seen in a map.

There are 68 properties and districts listed on the National Register in the county. Four sites are further designated as National Historic Landmarks. One is also designated as a National Historic Site and another is designated as a National Battlefield.

This National Park Service list is complete through NPS recent listings posted September 4, 2026.

== Current listings ==
	Name on the Register	Image	Date listed	Location	Municipality	Description
1	Alliance Furnace	Alliance Furnace	September 6, 1991 (#91001130)	Off Township 568 at Jacob's Creek, northeast of Perryopolis; 40°06′45″N 79°43′03″W	Perry Township	Ruins of a 1789 iron furnace, the first such structure west of the Appalachian Mountains.
2	Bowman's Castle	Bowman's Castle	March 3, 1975 (#75001641)	Front Street; 40°01′21″N 79°53′02″W	Brownsville	Commonly known as Nemacolin Castle (although Jacob Bowman called it Nemacolin), a 1750s trading post turned mid-19th Century mansion by Nelson and Charles Bowman (father and son).
3	Brier Hill	Brier Hill	July 2, 1973 (#73001629)	On U.S. Route 40 at Brier Hill; 39°58′46″N 79°49′49″W	Redstone Township	Well preserved example of a turn-of-the-20th Century coal mining community.
4	Brown-Moore Blacksmith Shop	Brown-Moore Blacksmith Shop	May 7, 1992 (#92000393)	0.1 miles (0.16 km) west of Pennsylvania Route 4020; 39°58′22″N 79°53′13″W	Luzerne Township	Early 19th Century blacksmith shop and general store.
5	Brownsville Bridge	Brownsville Bridge	June 22, 1988 (#88000834)	State Route 4025 over the Monongahela River; 40°01′20″N 79°53′26″W	Brownsville	1914 Pennsylvania truss style bridge. Extends into Washington County
6	Brownsville Commercial Historic District	Brownsville Commercial Historic District	August 2, 1993 (#93000716)	105–128 Brownsville Avenue and 1–145 Market, 101–200 High, 2–6 Water, 100 Charles, 1 Seneca, and 108 Bank Streets; 40°01′17″N 79°53′13″W	Brownsville	An assortment of 55 commercial buildings, constructed between the 1870s and the 1930s. Although now mostly vacant, the structure reflect the community's prominence as a business center within the industrial Monongahela Valley.
7	Brownsville Northside Historic District	Brownsville Northside Historic District	August 2, 1993 (#93000717)	Roughly bounded by Front Street, Broadway, Shaffner Road, and Baltimore Street; 40°01′19″N 79°52′51″W	Brownsville	Collection of 230 structures from the 19th and early 20th Centuries, a reflection of the town's history as an important stop on the National Road. Federal, Greek Revival, and Colonial Revival styles are prominent.
8	Carnegie Free Library	Carnegie Free Library	October 8, 1981 (#81000542)	South Pittsburgh Street; 40°00′56″N 79°35′19″W	Connellsville	1903 Italianate structure, part of the Carnegie library system.
9	Philip G. Cochran Memorial United Methodist Church	Philip G. Cochran Memorial United Methodist Church	June 4, 1984 (#84003364)	Howell and Griscom Streets; 40°02′49″N 79°39′17″W	Dawson	Built in the Gothic revival style, 1927 church is designed to mimic a 14th Century English parish.
10	Abel Colley Tavern	Abel Colley Tavern	November 27, 1995 (#95001352)	U.S. Route 40, approximately 0.5 miles (0.80 km) west of Searights Crossroads; 39°57′34″N 79°49′01″W	Menallen Township	1835 tavern from the National Road era.
11	Peter Colley Tavern and Barn	Peter Colley Tavern and Barn	July 24, 1973 (#73001630)	On U.S. Route 40 at Brier Hill; 39°58′49″N 79°49′53″W	Redstone Township	1796 tavern from the National Road era, and adjoining early 19th Century farmhouse and out buildings.
12	Colonial National Bank Building	Colonial National Bank Building	November 15, 2002 (#02001337)	101 East Crawford Avenue; 40°01′03″N 79°35′21″W	Connellsville	Greek revival structure from 1906, which is still in active use as an office building.
13	John P. Conn House	John P. Conn House	July 28, 1988 (#88001164)	84 Ben Lomond Street; 39°54′13″N 79°44′03″W	Uniontown	Well-preserved 1906 Colonial revival home, dating to the age of the "coal barons."
14	Connellsville Armory	Connellsville Armory	November 14, 1991 (#91001694)	108 West Washington Street; 40°00′41″N 79°35′24″W	Connellsville	1907 Gothic Revival complex, which served as a National Guard drilling station for nearly a century.
15	Connellsville Union Passenger Depot	Connellsville Union Passenger Depot	March 29, 1996 (#96000319)	900 West Crawford Avenue; 40°00′59″N 79°35′58″W	Connellsville	1913 train station from the legendary Pittsburgh & Lake Erie Railroad.
16	Col. Edward Cook House	Col. Edward Cook House	March 29, 1978 (#78003090)	East of Belle Vernon; 40°07′37″N 79°49′38″W	Washington Township	Traditional rural American home constructed in 1776 and occupied by the same family for 200 years.
17	Dawson Historic District	Dawson Historic District	November 5, 1997 (#97001252)	Roughly bounded by Howell Street, Middle Alley, the Youghiogheny River, River Road, and Spring and Locust Alleys; 40°02′48″N 79°39′31″W	Dawson	Features 107 structures of varying styles, many of which were building during the coal boom of the early 20th Century.
18	Deffenbaugh Site (36FA57)	Deffenbaugh Site (36FA57)	May 14, 1984 (#84003368)	On a saddle between two hills, along Old Frame Rd. 39°48′07″N 79°51′36″W	Nicholson Township	Excavatory site of an ancient village of the Monongahela culture.
19	John S. Douglas House	John S. Douglas House	February 4, 1994 (#94000006)	136 North Gallatin Avenue; 39°54′17″N 79°43′23″W	Uniontown	Now a funeral home, 1901 mansion displays Richardsonian Romanesque style.
20	Downer Tavern	Downer Tavern	November 27, 1995 (#95001351)	U.S. Route 40 at Chalkhill; 39°50′38″N 79°37′03″W	Wharton Township	1826 tavern was a stop on the National Road.
21	Dunlap's Creek Bridge	Dunlap's Creek Bridge	July 31, 1978 (#78002398)	Spans Dunlap Creek; 40°01′17″N 79°53′18″W	Brownsville	An active 1839 structure, it stands as the first cast iron bridge ever constructed in the United States.
22	Fallingwater	Fallingwater	July 23, 1974 (#74001781)	West of Pennsylvania Route 381; 39°54′24″N 79°28′05″W	Stewart Township	The preeminent Frank Lloyd Wright home, constructed over a waterfall in 1937, and named by the Smithsonian as one of the "Top 28 Places to Visit Before You Die."
23	Fayette-Springs Hotel	Fayette-Springs Hotel	November 27, 1995 (#95001358)	U.S. Route 40, approximately 0.5 miles (0.80 km) east of Chalk Hill; 39°50′26″N 79°36′36″W	Wharton Township	1822 inn on the National Road continues to operate as a restaurant.
24	Fort Necessity National Battlefield	Fort Necessity National Battlefield	October 15, 1966 (#66000664)	11 miles (18 km) east of Uniontown on U.S. Route 40; 39°49′07″N 79°35′37″W	Wharton Township	Site of the 1754 French & Indian War battle in with 22 year old George Washington suffered his only defeat as a commanding officer. Also included on this property is the gravesite of British General Edward Braddock, who was killed in a nearby skirmish in 1755.
25	Francis Farm Petroglyphs Site (36FA35)	Francis Farm Petroglyphs Site (36FA35)	May 10, 1984 (#84003370)	Off Perry Road, 1 mile (1.6 km) west of the junction of Pennsylvania Routes 51 and 201; 40°03′00″N 79°47′30″W	Jefferson Township	Well preserved collection of Woodland period petroglyphs.
26	Josiah Frost House	Josiah Frost House	October 24, 1996 (#96001209)	Southern side of U.S. Route 40, west of Searight's Corners; 39°57′18″N 79°48′21″W	Menallen Township	1822 Federal style structure was a stop on the National Road.
27	Thomas Gaddis Homestead	Thomas Gaddis Homestead	April 26, 1974 (#74001782)	South of Uniontown off U.S. Route 119; 39°52′02″N 79°44′39″W	South Union Township	Oldest structure in Fayette County and the second oldest log cabin located in Western Pennsylvania.
28	Gallatin School	Gallatin School	July 23, 1998 (#98000902)	165 N. Gallatin Avenue; 39°54′24″N 79°43′21″W	Uniontown	Former school building was building 1908 in the Classical revival style.
29	Albert Gallatin House; Friendship Hill National Historic Site	Albert Gallatin House; Friendship Hill National Historic Site	October 15, 1966 (#66000663)	3 miles (4.8 km) north of Point Marion on Pennsylvania Route 166; 39°46′39″N 79°55′36″W	Springhill Township	Contains the estate and 1789 home of early American statesman Albert Gallatin.
30	Isaac Newton Hagan House	Isaac Newton Hagan House	May 16, 2000 (#00000708)	723 Kentuck Road; 39°52′06″N 79°31′21″W	Stewart Township	Commonly known as Kentuck Knob, a 1956 Frank Lloyd Wright home, which is nestled into a rocky outcropping.
31	Hopwood-Miller Tavern	Hopwood-Miller Tavern	November 27, 1995 (#95001355)	U.S. Route 40 (Main Street) in Hopwood; 39°52′37″N 79°42′47″W	South Union Township	National Road tavern dates to 1816.
32	Johnson-Hatfield Tavern	Johnson-Hatfield Tavern	November 27, 1995 (#95001354)	U.S. Route 40, 0.5 miles (0.80 km) east of Brier Hill; 39°58′20″N 79°49′27″W	Redstone Township	Built in 1817 as an inn on the National Road.
33	Karolcik Building	Karolcik Building	October 24, 1997 (#97001246)	115–117 South Liberty Street; 40°05′12″N 79°45′05″W	Perryopolis	Ornate 1921 structure built as a single screen movie theater now houses various small businesses.
34	Hugh Laughlin House	Hugh Laughlin House	April 30, 1987 (#87000659)	Township Route 422 south of Brownsville; 39°59′53″N 79°50′28″W	Redstone Township	Farmhouse was constructed in the Georgian style.
35	Layton Bridge	Layton Bridge	June 22, 1988 (#88000840)	Legislative Route 26191 over the Youghiogheny River at Layton; 40°05′21″N 79°43′49″W	Perry Township	1899 Pratt truss railroad bridge, which, since 1933, has served automobiles. Featured prominently in The Silence of the Lambs.
36	Linden Hall at Saint James Park	Linden Hall at Saint James Park	October 11, 1989 (#89001787)	RR 26051 northwest of Dawson; 40°04′01″N 79°41′45″W	Lower Tyrone Township	1911 Tudor mansion is currently part of a country club.
37	Locus 7 Site	Locus 7 Site	March 20, 1980 (#80003495)	On a bluff above Downers Run north of Fayette City, 2,000 feet (610 m) east of the Monongahela River; 40°06′24″N 79°50′13″W	Washington Township	Archaeological site, which contains an ancient Monongahela village.
38	Marion Bridge	Marion Bridge	June 22, 1988 (#88000841)	Pennsylvania Route 88 over the Monongahela River; 39°44′22″N 79°54′19″W	Point Marion	1930 cantilevered truss bridge. Demolished November 16, 2009. Extended into Greene County.
39	Dr. J.C. McClenathan House and Office	Dr. J.C. McClenathan House and Office	November 15, 2002 (#02001335)	134 South Pittsburgh Street; 40°01′01″N 79°35′23″W	Connellsville	Medical office displays eclectic mix of Romanesque and Queen Anne architectural styles.
40	Isaac Meason House	Isaac Meason House	January 25, 1971 (#71000707)	U.S. Route 119 North in Mount Braddock; 39°57′15″N 79°38′54″W	Dunbar Township	Commonly known as Mount Braddock, 1802 mansion is one of two standing in the country that exhibit the Palladian stone-cut style.
41	Monroe Tavern	Monroe Tavern	November 27, 1995 (#95001357)	U.S. Route 40 (Main Street) in Hopwood; 39°52′32″N 79°42′03″W	South Union Township	1825 National Road tavern reflects adoption of Early Republic style construction.
42	Morris-Hair Tavern	Morris-Hair Tavern	November 27, 1995 (#95001356)	U.S. Route 40 (Main Street) in Hopwood; 39°52′25″N 79°41′58″W	South Union Township	A former National Road inn, structure was built in 1818.
43	Mount Vernon Furnace	Mount Vernon Furnace	September 6, 1991 (#91001127)	Entsey Road east of Pennsylvania Route 982, east of Scottdale; 40°05′45″N 79°30′38″W	Bullskin Township	Traditional iron blast furnace was in operation from 1795 to 1825.
44	New Geneva Historic District	New Geneva Historic District	August 28, 1996 (#95000119)	Roughly bounded by Front Street east from Church Lane, Georges Creek, and the Monongahela River; 39°47′11″N 79°54′49″W	Nicholson Township	Features 29 buildings in the Federal and Queen Anne style. Documents evolution of small industrial town founded by Albert Gallatin that specialized in pottery manufacturing until the early 20th Century.
45	Peter and Jonathan Newmyer Farm	Peter and Jonathan Newmyer Farm	July 23, 1998 (#98000901)	3165 Richey Road; 40°04′35″N 79°33′32″W	Bullskin Township	Comprises 8 structures from the 18th and 19th Century, including a traditional German-style bank barn.
46	Adam Clarke Nutt Mansion	Adam Clarke Nutt Mansion	October 25, 1990 (#90001607)	26 Nutt Avenue; 39°53′56″N 79°44′09″W	Uniontown	Mansion dates to the "coal baron" era and exhibits hallmarks of the Queen Anne and Second Empire building styles.
47	Oak Hill Estate	Oak Hill Estate	May 12, 1999 (#99000514)	U.S. Route 40, 0.25 miles (0.40 km) west of U.S. Route 119; 39°54′54″N 79°44′26″W	North Union Township	Classical revival mansion from the "coal baron" era is now part of the Mount Saint Macrina monastery.
48	Penn-Craft Historic District	Penn-Craft Historic District	May 18, 1989 (#89000356)	Roughly bounded by Legislative Route 4020 and Township Routes 326 and 549; 39°57′33″N 79°54′45″W	Luzerne Township	Contains 108 structures dating to the founding of the village as a self-contained, self-reliant community of miners facing poverty and unemployment during the Great Depression.
49	Providence Quaker Cemetery and Chapel	Providence Quaker Cemetery and Chapel	October 24, 1997 (#97001243)	Junction of Legislative Routes 4036 and 4038 West; 40°04′22″N 79°46′56″W	Perry Township	1895 stone church, which features many early 19th Century gravestones in the adjacent yard.
50	Andrew Rabb House	Andrew Rabb House	November 12, 1992 (#92001497)	Off Pennsylvania Route 166 north of Masontown; 39°52′15″N 79°54′27″W	German Township	Georgian home was constructed in 1773 by a prominent whiskey distiller.
51	Rush House	Rush House	March 8, 1978 (#78002399)	U.S. Route 40 and Pennsylvania Route 381 in Farmington; 39°48′26″N 79°33′58″W	Wharton Township	A tavern from the National Road era, structure was completed in 1837.
52	St. Nicholas Byzantine Catholic Church	St. Nicholas Byzantine Catholic Church	November 7, 1997 (#97001247)	504 South Liberty Street; 40°04′55″N 79°45′08″W	Perryopolis	Finished in 1918, church exhibits the Byzantine revival style.
53	St. Peter's Church	St. Peter's Church	October 15, 1980 (#80003494)	Church Street; 40°01′21″N 79°52′39″W	Brownsville	Contains the oldest continuously operating congregation of any faith in Western Pennsylvania. Current structure built in 1843 and is in elaborate cathedral, designed to serve as a potential diocesan seat.
54	Searight's Fulling Mill	Searight's Fulling Mill	June 19, 1973 (#73001631)	Cemetery Road; 40°05′01″N 79°44′42″W	Perryopolis	1810 structure is representative of small, highly localized manufacturing facilities in early industrial era.
55	Searights Tollhouse, National Road	Searights Tollhouse, National Road	October 15, 1966 (#66000665)	West of Uniontown off U.S. Route 40; 39°56′50″N 79°47′40″W	Menallen Township	1834 toll collection site along the National Road, operated as one of six such structures in Pennsylvania until 1905.
56	Shoaf Historic District	Shoaf Historic District	June 3, 1994 (#94000518)	Roughly bounded by 1–170 First Street, Second Street, processing buildings, and the bank of coke ovens 39°50′31″N 79°48′32″W	Georges Township	Consists of 39 structures, including shuttered coke ovens and traditional miners' duplexes, which would previously have been owned by the mine operator.
57	Smock Historic District	Smock Historic District	June 3, 1994 (#94000520)	Roughly bounded by Redstone Cemetery, Colonial Mine No. 1, Smock Hill, Colonial Mine No. 2, and Redstone Creek at Smock; 39°59′58″N 79°47′05″W	Franklin and Menallen Townships	Contains 177 structures in this former company town, including duplexes built for mine employees and detached homes constructed for supervisors.
58	Springer Farm	Springer Farm	July 23, 1982 (#82003788)	Pennsylvania Route 51, northwest of Uniontown; 39°55′08″N 79°44′33″W	North Union Township	Brick farmhouse dates to 1817.
59	Star Junction Historic District	Star Junction Historic District	October 24, 1997 (#97001244)	Roughly the junction of Pennsylvania Route 51 and Legislative Route 4036, including Post Office Road, Church Street, Pennsylvania Route 532, and Old Ridge Road; 40°03′42″N 79°45′43″W	Perry Township	Preserves 163 structures, mainly miners' duplexes and detached supervisor's quarters, documenting life in a traditional coal company town.
60	Summit Hotel	Summit Hotel	February 15, 2005 (#05000062)	101 Skyline Drive; 39°51′06″N 79°39′28″W	North Union and South Union Townships	Opened in 1907 in the Mission revival style, hotel contains to operate on a scenic crest.
61	Temple Ohave Israel	Temple Ohave Israel	February 2, 2016 (#15001032)	210 2nd St. 40°01′14″N 79°53′26″W	Brownsville	
62	Thomas H. Thompson House	Thomas H. Thompson House	February 24, 1995 (#95000128)	815 Water Street; 40°01′12″N 79°53′46″W	Brownsville	Built in 1906, Spanish revival mansion dates to the "coal baron" era.
63	Uniontown Downtown Historic District	Uniontown Downtown Historic District	May 19, 1989 (#89000357)	Roughly Main Street between Court Street and Mill Street; 39°54′04″N 79°43′33″W	Uniontown	Features 113 buildings from the late 19th and early 20th Centuries. Intricate apartment and office buildings ranging from the Classical revival to the Art moderne styles, as well as the imposing Romanesque courthouse, reflect the wealth generated by coal mining and coke production.
64	US Post Office-Connellsville	US Post Office-Connellsville	June 24, 1993 (#92001495)	115 North Arch Street; 40°00′58″N 79°35′23″W	Connellsville	1913 post office exemplifies handsome Colonial revival style of era's governmental buildings.
65	Wallace-Baily Tavern	Wallace-Baily Tavern	November 27, 1995 (#95001350)	U.S. Route 40, 1.5 miles (2.4 km) west of Brier Hill; 39°59′36″N 79°51′05″W	Redstone Township	1840 National Road era tavern contains expressive Greek portico.
66	Wharton Furnace	Wharton Furnace	September 6, 1991 (#91001143)	Wharton Furnace-Hull Road south of U.S. Route 40, southeast of Hopwood; 39°49′32″N 79°38′18″W	Wharton Township	Traditional blast furnace was used in iron production from 1839 to 1850.
67	Whitsett Historic District	Whitsett Historic District	July 21, 1995 (#95000883)	Roughly bounded by the Youghiogheny River, the former Elwell Branch of the Pittsburgh and Lake Erie railroad tracks, and Elwell Run, at Whitsett; 40°06′22″N 79°46′21″W	Perry Township	Includes 48 structures from the community's founding as a coal mining company town, particularly wood frame duplex homes.
68	Youghiogheny Bank of Pennsylvania	Youghiogheny Bank of Pennsylvania	October 24, 1997 (#97001245)	South Liberty Street, south of Washington Diamond; 40°05′12″N 79°45′03″W	Perryopolis	Utilitarian 1817 stone structure once held the first formal bank in Western Pennsylvania.

== See also ==
- National Register of Historic Places listings in Pennsylvania
- List of National Historic Landmarks in Pennsylvania
- List of Pennsylvania state historical markers in Fayette County
