= List of Pennsylvania state historical markers in Fayette County =

Location of Fayette County in Pennsylvania

This is a list of the Pennsylvania state historical markers in Fayette County.

This is intended to be a complete list of the official state historical markers placed in Fayette County, Pennsylvania by the Pennsylvania Historical and Museum Commission (PHMC). The locations of the historical markers, as well as the latitude and longitude coordinates as provided by the PHMC's database, are included below when available. There are 49 historical markers located in Fayette County.

== Historical markers ==
Marker title	Image	Date dedicated	Location	Marker type	Topics
Albert Gallatin		November 23, 1946	Junction US 119 & PA 166, north of Point Marion (MISSING)	Roadside	Government & Politics, Government & Politics 18th Century
Alliance Furnace		November 22, 1946	Banning & Layton Roads, Perryopolis; 40.10128°N 79.709541°W	Roadside	Business & Industry, Furnaces, Iron, Military, Native American
Alliance Furnace		November 22, 1946	PA 819, 1 mile north of Dawson (MISSING)	Roadside	Business & Industry, Furnaces, Iron, Military, Native American
Benjamin Wells		July 19, 1994	US 119 at North 7th Street, Connellsville; 40.01847°N 79.59966°W	City	Government & Politics, Government & Politics 18th Century, Military, Whiskey Rebellion
Birthplace of John Alfred Brashear (1840-1920) - PLAQUE		May 1943	Front Street, Brownsville	Plaque	Medicine & Science, Professions & Vocations
Boatbuilding Center/Steamboat Enterprise		August 27, 1994	Dunlap's Creek Park, Market Street & Bank Street, Brownsville; 40.021393°N 79.888297°W	Roadside	Business & Industry, Transportation
Braddock Park		November 23, 1946	At park, National Road (US 40), 2.5 miles northwest of Farmington; 39.832007°N 79.600891°W	Roadside	French & Indian War, Military, Roads
Braddock Road (Dunbar's Camp)		June 17, 1952	Jumonville Rd. (SR 2021), ~3 miles north of National Road (US 40), Jumonville; 39.88237°N 79.64622°W	Roadside	French & Indian War, Military, Roads
Braddock Road (Rock Fort Camp)		June 17, 1952	National Road (US 40) at Jumonville Road (SR 2021), across from Summit Inn & Restaurant, Summit; 39.84992°N 79.65705°W	Roadside	French & Indian War, George Washington, Military, Native American, Roads
Braddock Road (Stewart's Crossing)		August 26, 1952	US 119, .2 mile south of Connellsville; 40.00055°N 79.60515°W	Roadside	Forts, French & Indian War, Military, Roads
Braddock Road (Twelve Springs Camp)		May 21, 1952	National Road (US 40), 3.5 miles southeast of Farmington; 39.77768°N 79.50087°W	Roadside	American Revolution, Forts, Military, Roads, Transportation
Brashear House		November 22, 1946	6th & Market Streets (US 40), Brownsville; 40.021635°N 79.879162°W	Roadside	Buildings, Business & Industry, Education, Houses & Homesteads, Professions & Vocations, Inns & Taverns
Brownsville		November 22, 1946	National Pike at south end of Brownsville; 40.01833°N 79.87914°W	Roadside	Cities & Towns, Forts, Military, Paths & Trails, Roads
Coke Ovens		November 22, 1946	PA 51 just west of Perryopolis; 40.071117°N 79.761983°W	Roadside	Business & Industry, Coal, Iron, Steel
Col. William Crawford		n/a	US 119 at North 7th Street, .2 mile south of Connellsville; 40.01908°N 79.5994°W	Roadside	American Revolution, French & Indian War, George Washington, Military, Native American
Colonel William Crawford - PLAQUE		October 1918	South Pittsburgh Street & East South Street, Connellsville; 40.015973°N 79.588653°W	Plaque	American Revolution, George Washington, Military
Connellsville Coke Region		March 15, 2007	US 119S, near entrance to PSU Fayette, Eberly Campus, Uniontown; 39.945529°N 79.656444°W	Roadside	Business & Industry, Coal, Iron, Labor, Steel
Dunbar's Camp		June 18, 1946	National Road (US 40), approximately 6 miles southeast of Uniontown, at Summit (MISSING)	City	French & Indian War, Military
Dunlap's Creek Bridge		November 29, 1991	At bridge, Market Street, Brownsville; 40.021366°N 79.88808°W	Roadside	Bridges, Roads, Transportation
Edwin S. Porter		May 2, 1992	Pittsburgh Street & Fairview Avenue, Connellsville; 40.01645°N 79.58895°W	City	Business & Industry, Motion Pictures & Television, Professions & Vocations
Fallingwater		May 15, 1994	Mill Run Road (PA 381) near entrance to Fallingwater, Mill Run; 39.900547°N 79.465509°W	Roadside	Buildings, Houses & Homesteads, Professions & Vocations
Fayette County		October 21, 1982	County Courthouse, East Main Street (Business US 40), Uniontown; 39.901469°N 79.723229°W	City	Forts, French & Indian War, Government & Politics, Government & Politics 18th Century, Roads
Fort Gaddis		November 23, 1946	SR 3019 (old US 119), 2 miles south of Uniontown; 39.86778°N 79.7442°W	Roadside	American Revolution, Forts, Military, Native American, Paths & Trails
Fort Mason		November 23, 1946	East Main Street (PA 166), near Fairview Avenue, Masontown; 39.843275°N 79.899198°W	Roadside	American Revolution, Forts, Military
Fort Necessity		June 18, 1946	At entrance to Fort Necessity National Battlefield, National Road (US 40), Farmington; 39.805666°N 79.561207°W	City	Forts, French & Indian War, George Washington, Military
Fort Necessity - PLAQUE		July 1926	Mount Washington Tavern, National Road (US 40), 1 mile northwest of Farmington; 39.818046°N 79.587662°W	Plaque	Forts, French & Indian War, George Washington, Military
George C. Marshall		January 17, 1981	142 West Main Street (US 40), Uniontown; 39.900868°N 79.730648°W	City	Government & Politics, Government & Politics 20th Century, Military, Military Post-Civil War
George Washington		July 16, 1946	PA 51 in Perryopolis (MISSING)	Roadside	George Washington, Government & Politics, Government & Politics 18th Century
Gist's Plantation		n/a	US 119, 4.5 miles southwest of Connellsville; 39.95499°N 79.65162°W	City	Forts, French & Indian War, George Washington, Military
James Finley (1756-1828)		November 7, 2008	Uniontown Public Library, 24 Jefferson Street, Uniontown; 39.899317°N 79.722667°W	Roadside	Bridges, Government & Politics, Professions & Vocations
Jumonville Defeat		May 24, 1946	National Road (US 40) approximately 6 miles southeast of Uniontown at Summit (MISSING)	City	French & Indian War, George Washington, Military
Meason House		November 22, 1946	US 119 4.5 miles southwest of Connellsville; 39.95405°N 79.65198°W	Roadside	Buildings, Business & Industry, Iron, Mansions & Manors, Mills
Mount Washington Tavern		November 23, 1946	National Road (US 40), 1.2 miles northwest of Farmington (MISSING)	Roadside	Buildings, Business & Industry, George Washington, Roads, Inns & Taverns
National Road		October 12, 1948	National Road (US 40), 1.7 miles northwest of Farmington; 39.8244°N 76.5935°W	Roadside	Government & Politics, Roads, Transportation
National Road		October 12, 1948	National Road (US 40), northwest of Brier Hill; 39.988339°N 79.842568°W	Roadside	Government & Politics, Roads, Transportation
National Road (Chestnut Ridge)		May 19, 1996	National Pike (US 40 Business) & Hopwood Fairchance Road, Hopwood; 39.872228°N 79.698595°W	City	Government & Politics, Railroads, Roads, Transportation
Old Glassworks		June 1, 1955	Across from Albert Gallatin High School, New Geneva Road (PA 166), Point Marion; 39.779911°N 79.920143°W	Roadside	Business & Industry, Glass
Penn-Craft		November 8, 1991	Penncraft Road, East Millsboro; 39.959661°N 79.914091°W	Roadside	Cities & Towns, Coal, Government & Politics, Labor
Pennsylvania		March 28, 1949	US 119, 175 feet north of state line (MISSING)	Roadside	Government & Politics, Government & Politics 17th Century, William Penn
Philander Knox		November 22, 1946	322 Front Street, Brownsville; 40.021117°N 79.881667°W	Roadside	Government & Politics, Government & Politics 19th Century
Searight's Tavern		June 18, 1946	National Road (US 40) southeast of Brier Hill (MISSING)	City	Buildings, Business & Industry, Inns & Taverns
Searight's Tollhouse		n/a	At site on National Road (US 40) between Lacy Road & Dearth / Canistra Roads, 5 miles northwest of Uniontown; 39.94742°N 79.79428°W	Roadside	Roads, Transportation
Toll House		July 3, 1947	National Road (US 40), near Dearth / Canistra Roads, 5 miles northwest of Uniontown; 39.94643°N 79.79285°W	Roadside	Government & Politics 19th Century, Roads, Transportation
Uniontown		November 23, 1946	US 40 at Uniontown (MISSING)	Roadside	Cities & Towns, Forts, Roads
Uniontown		September 15, 1947	Morgantown Road & Vine Street, Uniontown; 39.887965°N 79.736334°W	Roadside	Cities & Towns, Forts, Roads
Uniontown		September 15, 1947	National Road (US 40) W of Uniontown (MISSING)	Roadside	Cities & Towns, Forts, Roads
Uniontown		November 23, 1946	US 119 at Uniontown (MISSING)	Roadside	Cities & Towns
Washington Mill		November 22, 1946	SR 4038, Perryopolis (MISSING)	Roadside	Buildings, Business & Industry, George Washington, Mills
World War II Connellsville Canteen		April 23, 1994	North Water Street, north of West Peach Street, Connellsville; 40.02003°N 79.59245°W	City	Military, Military Post-Civil War, Women

== See also ==
- List of Pennsylvania state historical markers
- National Register of Historic Places listings in Fayette County, Pennsylvania
