= Grindstone-Rowes Run, Pennsylvania =

Grindstone-Rowes Run
- Former CDP
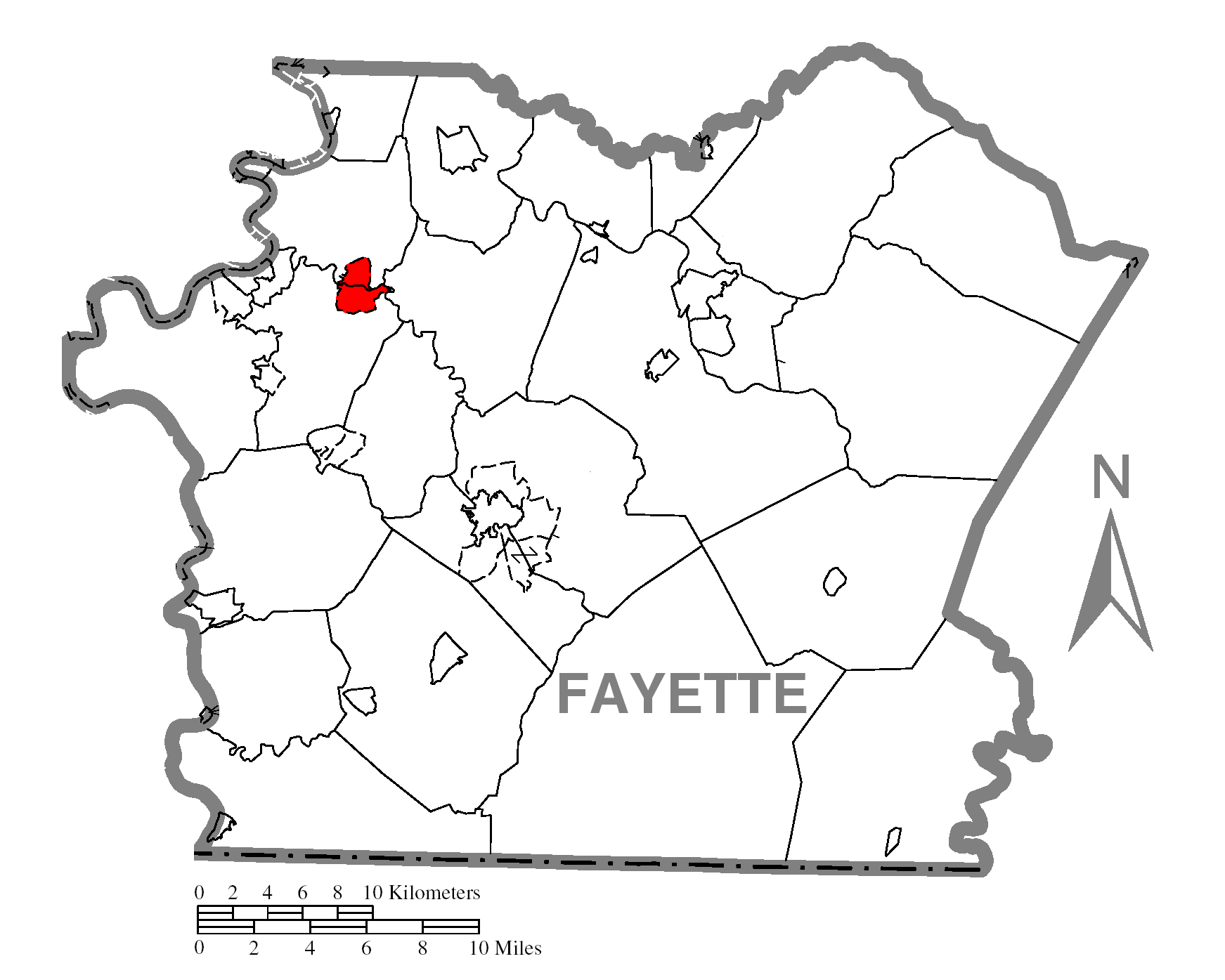
- Location of Grindstone-Rowes Run in Fayette County
- Coordinates: 40°0′44″N 79°49′15″W
- Country: United States
- State: Pennsylvania
- County: Fayette

Area
  - Total: 2.2 sq mi (5.7 km^{2})

Population (2000)
  - Total: 1,141
  - Density: 520/sq mi (200/km^{2})
- Time zone: UTC-4 (EST)
  - Summer (DST): UTC-5 (EDT)
- Area code: 724

Grindstone-Rowes Run was a census-designated place (CDP) in Fayette County, Pennsylvania, United States.

The population was 1,141 at the time of the 2000 census. For the 2010 census, the area was split into two CDPs, Grindstone and Rowes Run. The village of Grindstone is located in Jefferson Township, while Rowes Run is located in Redstone Township.

== Geography ==
Grindstone-Rowes Run was located at 40°0′44″N 79°49′15″W (40.012106, −79.820708).

According to the United States Census Bureau, the CDP had a total area of 2.2 square miles (5.7 km^{2}), all of it land.

== Demographics ==
As of the 2000 census, there were 1,141 people, 484 households, and 323 families residing in the CDP.

The population density was 531.7 inhabitants per square mile (205.3/km^{2}). There were 530 housing units at an average density of 247.0 per square mile (95.4/km^{2}).

The racial makeup of the CDP was 95.35% White, 3.07% African American, 0.09% Native American, 0.09% Pacific Islander, 0.79% from other races, and 0.61% from two or more races. Hispanic or Latino of any race were 0.53% of the population.

There were 484 households, out of which 24.6% had children under the age of eighteen living with them; 47.3% were married couples living together, 14.0% had a female householder with no husband present, and 33.1% were non-families. 30.0% of all households were made up of individuals, and 18.4% had someone living alone who was sixty-five years of age or older.

The average household size was 2.36 and the average family size was 2.92.

In the CDP, the population was spread out, with 20.9% under the age of eighteen, 7.5% from eighteen to twenty-four, 27.1% from twenty-five to forty-four 24.2% from forty-five to sixty-four, and 20.2% who were sixty-five years of age or older. The median age was forty-one years.

For every one hundred females, there were 92.1 males. For every one hundred females who were aged eighteen or older, there were 86.4 males.

The median income for a household in the CDP was $23,810, and the median income for a family was $30,625. Males had a median income of $27,045 compared with that of $17,500 for females.

The per capita income for the CDP was $12,486.

Roughly 15.8% of families and 21.6% of the population were living below the poverty line, including 39.1% of those who were under the age of eighteen and 11.1% of those who were aged sixty-five or older.
