= Deer Lake, Fayette County, Pennsylvania =

Unincorporated community in Pennsylvania, US

- Census-designated place
- Location within Pennsylvania Location within the United States
- Coordinates: 39°50′53″N 79°35′26″W
- Country: United States
- State: Pennsylvania
- County: Fayette
- Township: Wharton

Area
  - Total: 1.61 sq mi (4.16 km^{2})
  - Land: 1.51 sq mi (3.92 km^{2})
  - Water: 0.093 sq mi (0.24 km^{2})
- Elevation: 1,936 ft (590 m)

Population (2020)
  - Total: 482
  - Density: 318.2/sq mi (122.85/km^{2})
- Time zone: UTC-5 (Eastern (EST))
  - Summer (DST): UTC-4 (EDT)
- FIPS code: 42-18568
- GNIS feature ID: 2631258

Deer Lake is an unincorporated community and census-designated place in Wharton Township, Fayette County, Pennsylvania, United States. It is 1 mile (1.6 km) east of Chalkhill and 5 miles (8 km) northwest of Farmington in the Laurel Highlands of southwestern Pennsylvania. As of the 2010 census, the population was 495.

== Demographics ==
Historical population
Census	Pop.	Note	%±
2020	482		—
U.S. Decennial Census

The 2020 United States census gave the population as 482.
