= Bobby Locke (baseball) =

American baseball player (1934–2020)

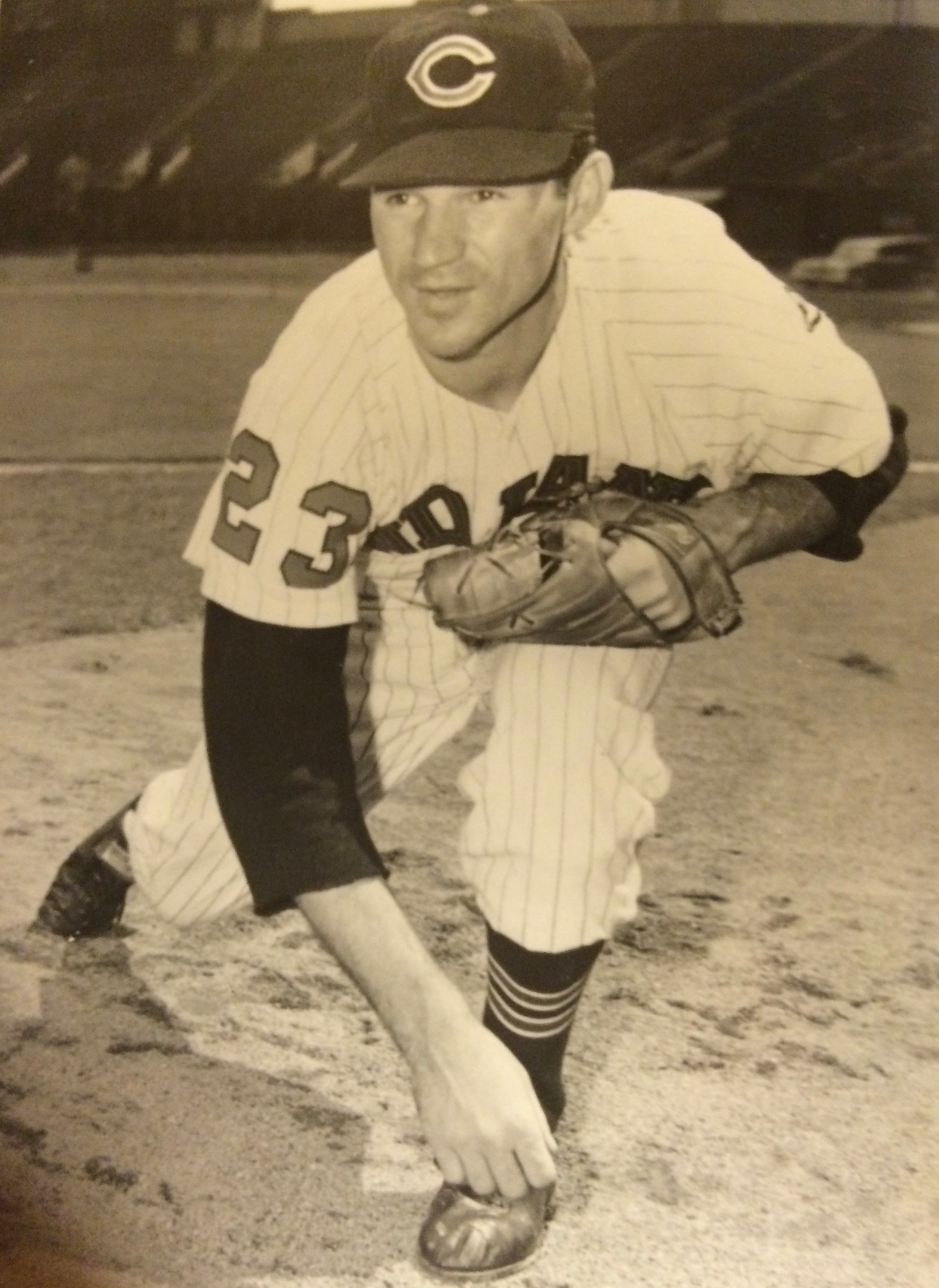
- Locke in 1960
- Pitcher
- Born: March 3, 1934; Rowes Run, Pennsylvania, U.S.
- Died: June 4, 2020 (aged 86); Dunbar, Pennsylvania, U.S.
- Batted: Right Threw: Right

MLB debut
- June 18, 1959, for the Cleveland Indians

Last MLB appearance
- September 29, 1968, for the California Angels

MLB statistics
- Win–loss record: 16–15
- Earned run average: 4.02
- Strikeouts: 194
- Stats at Baseball Reference

Teams
- Cleveland Indians (1959–1961); St. Louis Cardinals (1962); Philadelphia Phillies (1962–1964); Cincinnati Reds (1965); California Angels (1967–1968)

Lawrence Donald "Bobby" Locke (March 3, 1934 – June 4, 2020) was an American professional baseball right-handed pitcher, who played in Major League Baseball (MLB) in all or parts of nine seasons (1959–1965; 1967–1968) for the Cleveland Indians, St. Louis Cardinals, Philadelphia Phillies, Cincinnati Reds and California Angels. During his playing days, he stood 5 ft 11 in (1.80 m) tall, weighing 185 pounds (84 kg).

== Major League career ==
=== Cleveland Indians ===
Locke made his Indians' debut in 1959 against the Boston Red Sox. He was the starting pitcher for the Indians, and his first pitch was to Don Buddin. After recording two outs, the first hit he gave up was to Vic Wertz, which resulted in Gene Stephens scoring the first run against Locke. In his debut he pitched for 5 2/3 innings and gave up five runs, but still managed to walk away with the no-decision. However, his main contribution to his debut was hitting a home run off Frank Sullivan, which resulted in three runs being scored. This was to be the only home run of his career.

In 1959 overall, he posted a 3.13 ERA in 24 games, seven of them started. He struck out 40 batters, walked 41 and posted a record of 3–2.

In 1960, Locke posted a 3–5 record, with an ERA of 3.37. He started 11 of the 32 games he appeared in and struck out 53 batters in 123 innings. He also completed the only two games of his career that year.

In 1961 he posted a 4.53 ERA while giving up 112 hits in 95.1 innings. He walked 40 batters, struck out 37 and posted a 4–4 record.

=== Career after the Indians ===
After the 1961 season, Locke was traded to the Chicago Cubs for Jerry Kindall.

He moved to the St. Louis Cardinals for the 1962 season but after only playing one game with them, he moved to the Philadelphia Phillies.

Between 1962 and 1964, Locke appeared in 22 games for the Phillies, with a record of one win and no losses.

== Totals ==
Overall, Locke had a 16–15 record in 165 games. In 416.2 innings pitched, he walked 165 batters (bases on balls) and struck out 194 while allowing 432 hits. As a batter he made 25 hits in 98 at-bats for a .255 career batting average with one home run and 12 RBI. As a fielder, he achieved a .968 fielding percentage.
