= Rowes Run, Pennsylvania =

Unincorporated community in Pennsylvania, US

- Census-designated place
- Location within Pennsylvania Location within the United States
- Coordinates: 40°0′35″N 79°48′51″W
- Country: United States
- State: Pennsylvania
- County: Fayette
- Township: Redstone

Area
  - Total: 1.2 sq mi (3.2 km^{2})
  - Land: 1.2 sq mi (3.2 km^{2})
  - Water: 0 sq mi (0.0 km^{2})
- Elevation: 980 ft (300 m)

Population (2020)
  - Total: 517
  - Density: 419/sq mi (161.8/km^{2})
- Time zone: UTC-5 (Eastern (EST))
  - Summer (DST): UTC-4 (EDT)
- FIPS code: 42-66472
- GNIS feature ID: 1193232

Rowes Run is an unincorporated community and census-designated place in Redstone Township, Pennsylvania, United States. As of the 2020 census, its population was 517. The community was part of the Grindstone-Rowes Run CDP before it was split into two separate CDPs for the 2010 census.

== History ==
Rowes Run was founded in 1907 by the Pittsburgh Coal Company. Also known as "New Hill", it was named for a stream that ran through property owned by James Rowe, a prominent figure in the area. The mine located in the town was known as Colonial #3. In 1911, the town was acquired by the H. C. Frick Coke Company.

== Geography ==
Rowes Run is located in northwestern Fayette County, at the northern end of Redstone Township. It is bordered to the north, across Grindstone Road, by the community of Grindstone. Redstone Creek forms the northern border of the Rowes Run CDP east of Grindstone Road. Brownsville is 5 miles (8 km) to the west, and Uniontown, the county seat, is 11 miles (18 km) to the southeast.

According to the U.S. Census Bureau, the Rowes Run CDP has an area of 1.2 square miles (3.2 km^{2}), all land.

== Notable person ==
- Bobby Locke, baseball player
