= Grindstone, Pennsylvania =

Unincorporated community in Pennsylvania, US

- Census-designated place
- Location within Pennsylvania Location within the United States
- Coordinates: 40°01′02″N 79°49′53″W
- Country: United States
- State: Pennsylvania
- County: Fayette
- Townships: Jefferson, Redstone

Area
  - Total: 1.32 sq mi (3.41 km^{2})
  - Land: 1.32 sq mi (3.41 km^{2})
  - Water: 0 sq mi (0.00 km^{2})
- Elevation: 833 ft (254 m)

Population (2020)
  - Total: 489
  - Density: 371.9/sq mi (143.61/km^{2})
- Time zone: UTC-5 (Eastern (EST))
  - Summer (DST): UTC-4 (EDT)
- ZIP code: 15442
- FIPS code: 42-31592
- GNIS feature ID: 1176245

Grindstone is an unincorporated community and census-designated place that is located in Jefferson and Redstone townships, in Fayette County, Pennsylvania, United States. The community was part of the Grindstone-Rowes Run CDP before it was split into two separate CDPs for the 2010 census. In 2010, the population was 498.

The ZIP code for this community is 15442.

== Geography ==
Grindstone is primarily located in southern Jefferson Township but extends south across Redstone Creek into the northern part of Redstone Township. It is bordered to the southeast by the community of Rowes Run.

Fayette City is 7.5 miles (12.1 km) to the north, and Uniontown, the Fayette County seat, is 12 miles (19 km) to the southeast. Brownsville is 4 miles (6 km) to the west.

== Demographics ==
As of the 2020 U.S. Census, this town's population was 489.
