= Downer Tavern =

Historic house in Pennsylvania, United States

- U.S. National Register of Historic Places
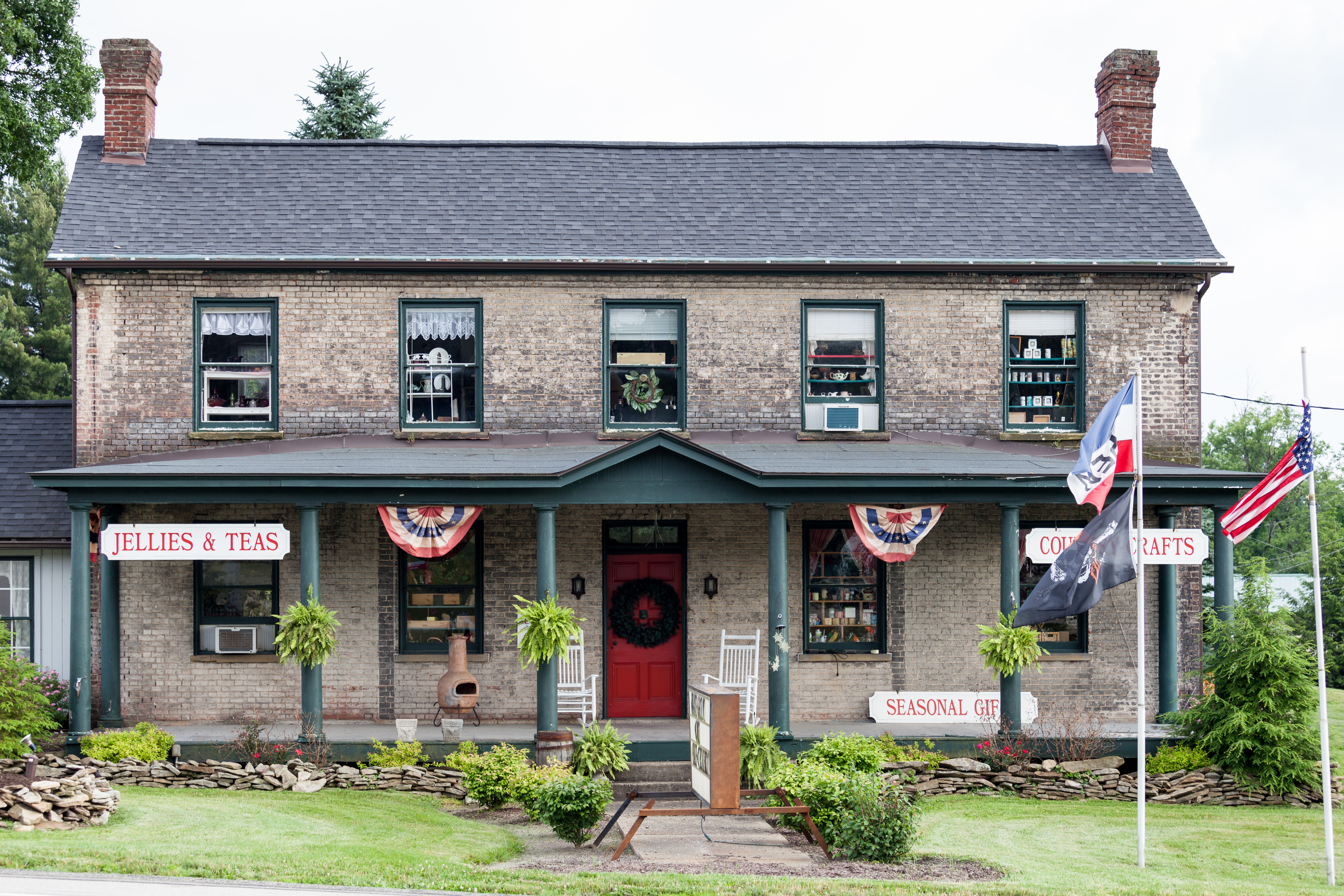
- The tavern in July, 2014, from Rt. 40.

- Location within Pennsylvania Location within the United States
- Location: U.S. Route 40 in Chalk Hill, Wharton Township, Pennsylvania
- Coordinates: 39°50′38.9″N 79°37′7.1″W
- Area: less than one acre
- Built: c. 1826
- Architectural style: Federal
- MPS: National Road in Pennsylvania MPS
- NRHP reference No.: 95001351
- Added to NRHP: November 27, 1995

Downer Tavern, also known as the Jonathan Downer House, is a historic home that also served as an inn and tavern located in Chalk Hill, Wharton Township, Fayette County, Pennsylvania. It was built about 1826, and is a 2 1/2-story, 5-bay, brick building with a center hall floor plan with Federal style detailing. It has a two-story, kitchen ell. Also on the property is a 1 1/2-story stone spring house (now a residence) and a late-19th century frame wash house. It served as a stop for 19th-century travelers on the National Road.

It was added to the National Register of Historic Places in 1995.
