= Peter Colley Tavern and Barn =

Historic tavern in Pennsylvania, United States

- U.S. National Register of Historic Places
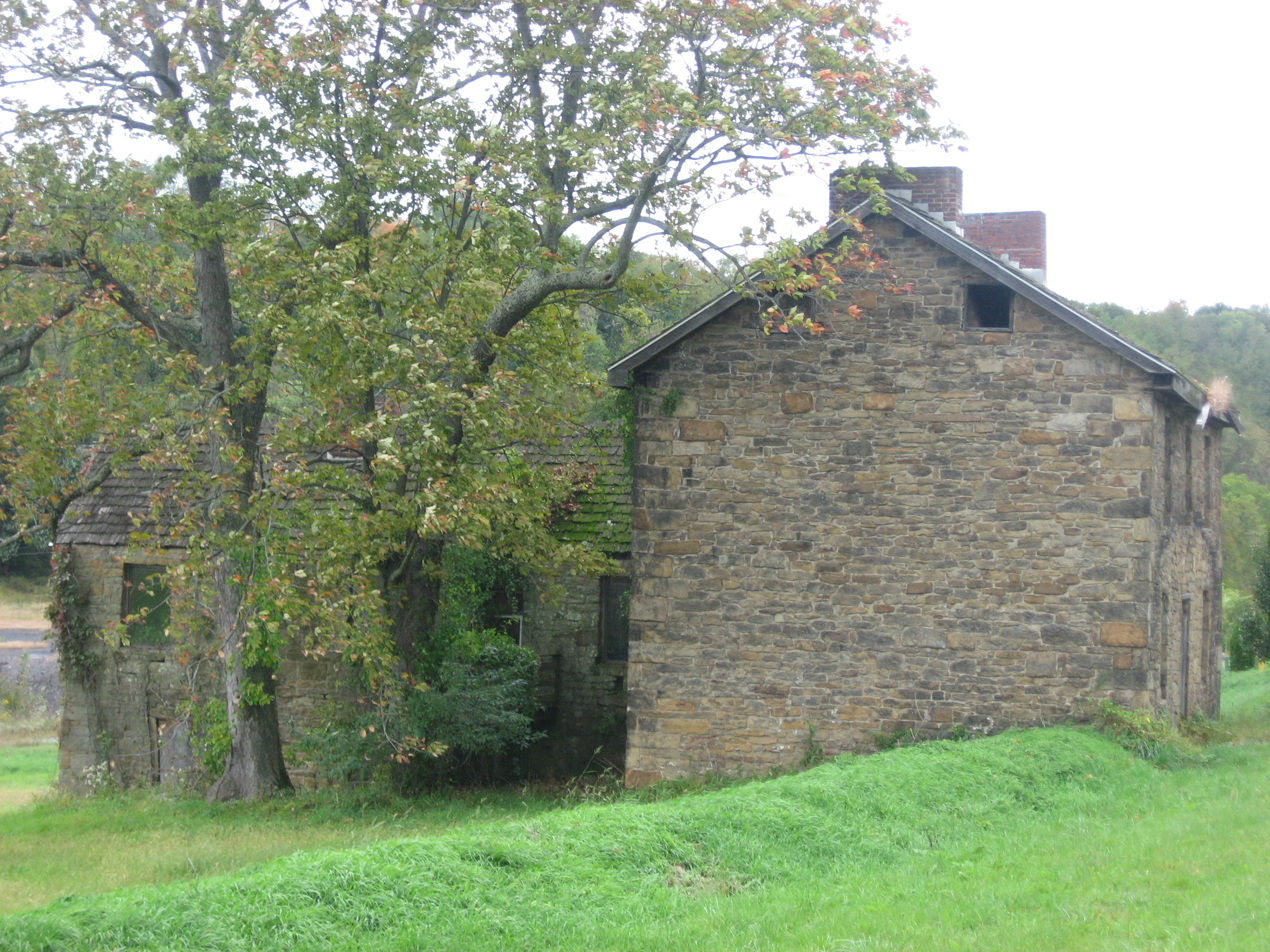
- Peter Colley Tavern, September 2011

- Location within Pennsylvania Location within the United States
- Location: On U.S. Route 40 at Brier Hill, Redstone Township, Pennsylvania
- Coordinates: 39°58′49″N 79°49′53″W
- Area: 2 acres (0.81 ha)
- Built: c. 1796, 1848
- Architectural style: Gothic Revival
- NRHP reference No.: 73001630
- Added to NRHP: July 24, 1973

Peter Colley Tavern and Barn is a historic home that also served as an inn and tavern located at Redstone Township, Fayette County, Pennsylvania. It was built about 1796, and is a 2 1/2-story, 3-bay, stone building with a 2 1/2-story sandstone rear addition. Also on the property is a contributing bank barn, built in 1848. It served as a stop for 19th-century travelers on the National Road.

It was added to the National Register of Historic Places in 1973.
