= Dunbar Township, Pennsylvania =

Township in Pennsylvania, US

Coordinates: 40°02′00″N 79°36′59″W

Dunbar Township
- Township
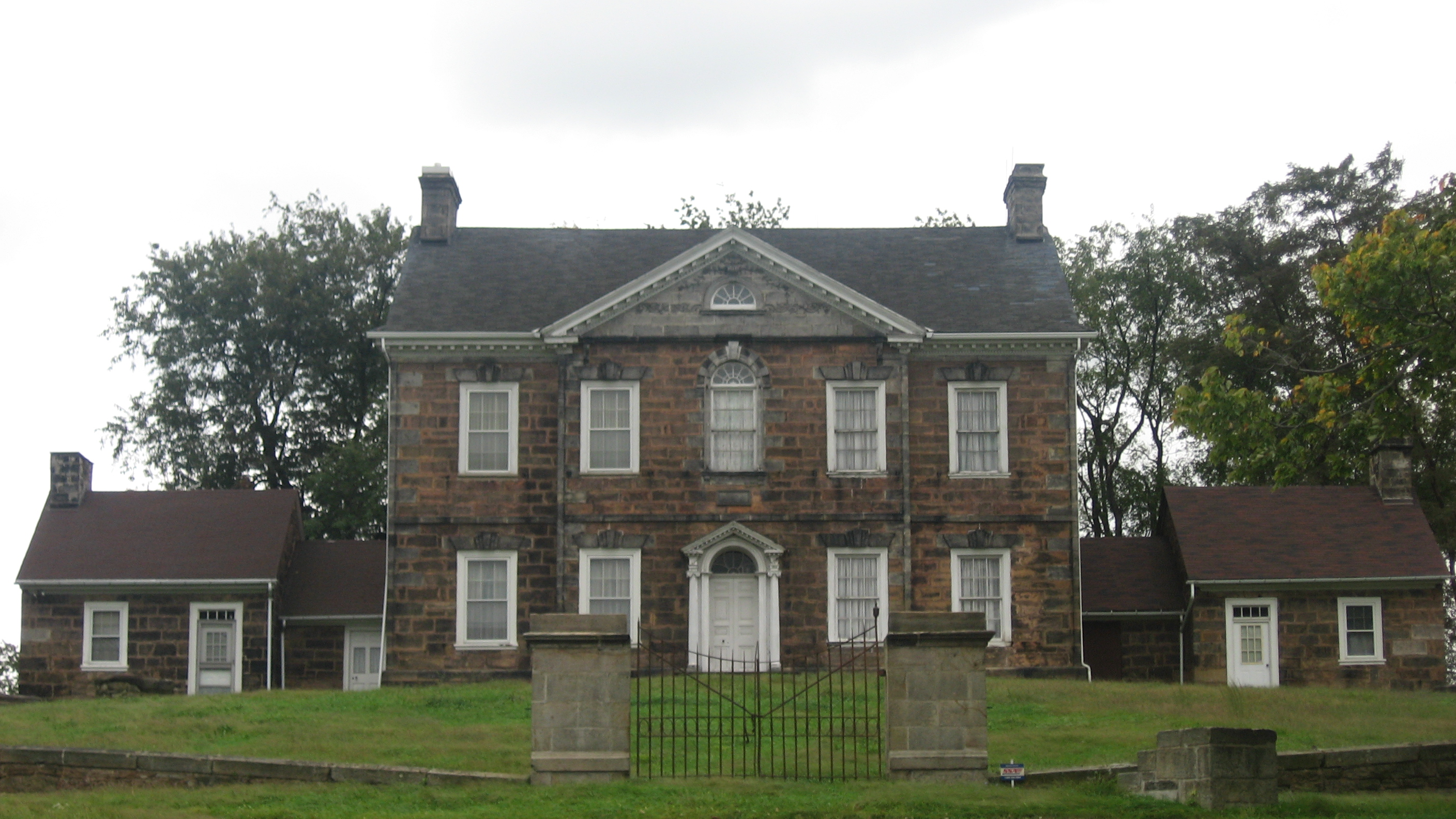
- The Isaac Meason House, a historic house in the township

- Logo

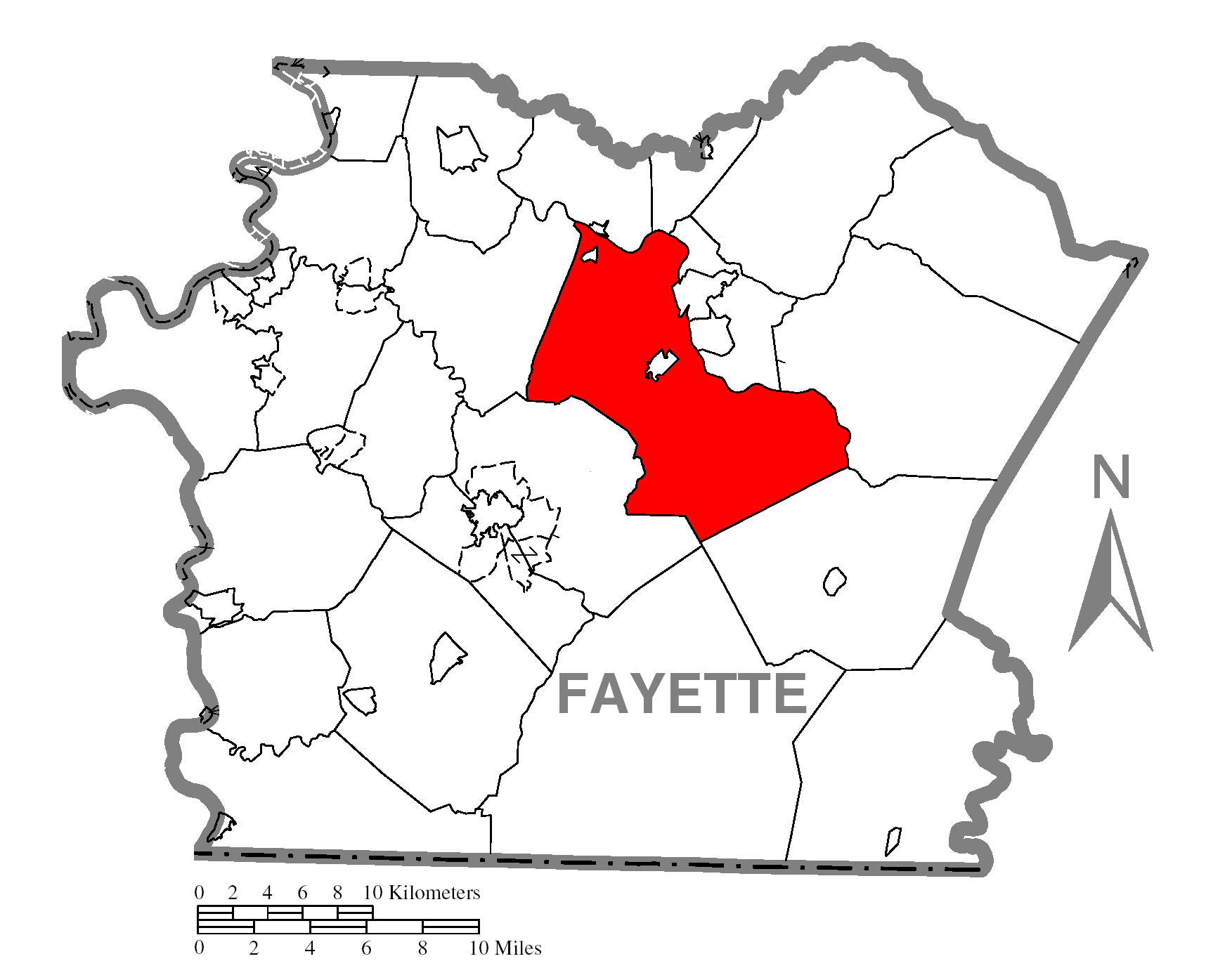
- Location of Dunbar Township in Fayette County

- Location of Fayette County in Pennsylvania
- Country: United States
- State: Pennsylvania
- County: Fayette
- Incorporated as a Township: December, 1798

Area
  - Total: 59.54 sq mi (154.21 km^{2})
  - Land: 59.10 sq mi (153.06 km^{2})
  - Water: 0.44 sq mi (1.15 km^{2})

Population (2020)
  - Total: 6,671 ▼
  - Estimate (2022): 6,519
  - Density: 117.1/sq mi (45.22/km^{2})
- Time zone: UTC-4 (EST)
  - Summer (DST): UTC-5 (EDT)
- Area code: 724
- FIPS code: 42-051-20224
- Website: dunbartownship.com

Dunbar Township is a township in Fayette County, Pennsylvania, United States. The population was 6,671 at the 2020 census, a decline from the figure of 7,126 tabulated in 2010.

Dunbar Township includes the unincorporated communities of Dickerson Run, Liberty, Adelaide, Crossland, Juniata, Little Summit, Graham Crossing, Leisenring, West Leisenring, Rogerstown, Trotter, Greenwood Heights, Wheeler, Fayette, Sitka, Bowest, Dunbar, Monarch, Morrell, Mahoning, Hill Farm, Ferguson, Pechin, Brown Row, Hardy Hill, Factory Hill, Furnace Hill, and Irishtown.

== History ==
Dunbar Township was originally settled about 1752, and was incorporated into a township (out of Menallen Township) in December, 1798.

The Isaac Meason House was designated a National Historic Landmark in 1971.

== Geography ==
Dunbar Township is in north-central Fayette County. It is bordered to the north and east by the Youghiogheny River, except where it touches the city of Connellsville. The township surrounds the boroughs of Dunbar (near the township center) and Vanderbilt (in the northwest). Across the Youghiogheny, the township is bordered by the borough of South Connellsville to the northeast and by the borough of Dawson to the north.

According to the United States Census Bureau, the township has a total area of 59.54 square miles (154.21 km^{2}), of which 59.10 square miles (153.06 km^{2}) is land and 0.44 square miles (1.15 km^{2}), or 0.74%, is water.

U.S. Route 119 crosses the township, leading northeast to Connellsville and southwest to Uniontown, the Fayette County seat.

== Demographics ==
Historical population
Census	Pop.	Note	%±
2010	7,126		—
2020	6,671		−6.4%
2022 (est.)	6,519		−2.3%
U.S. Decennial Census

As of the 2000 census, there were 7,562 people, 2,944 households, and 2,140 families residing in the township. The population density was 128.0 inhabitants per square mile (49.4/km^{2}). There were 3,152 housing units at an average density of 53.3 per square mile (20.6/km^{2}). The racial makeup of the township was 97.57% White, 1.52% African American, 0.12% Native American, 0.21% Asian, 0.04% from other races, and 0.54% from two or more races. Hispanic or Latino of any race were 0.32% of the population.

There were 2,944 households, out of which 30.1% had children under the age of 18 living with them, 56.8% were married couples living together, 11.0% had a female householder with no husband present, and 27.3% were non-families. 23.8% of all households were made up of individuals, and 11.1% had someone living alone who was 65 years of age or older. The average household size was 2.53 and the average family size was 3.00.

In the township the population was spread out, with 23.0% under the age of 18, 7.7% from 18 to 24, 28.0% from 25 to 44, 25.6% from 45 to 64, and 15.7% who were 65 years of age or older. The median age was 40 years. For every 100 females, there were 97.4 males. For every 100 females age 18 and over, there were 91.5 males.

The median income for a household in the township was $31,951, and the median income for a family was $38,438. Males had a median income of $29,516 versus $20,670 for females. The per capita income for the township was $15,083. About 8.7% of families and 13.1% of the population were below the poverty line, including 15.1% of those under age 18 and 14.2% of those age 65 or over.
