= Fayette Springs Hotel =

- Fayette-Springs Hotel
- U.S. National Register of Historic Places
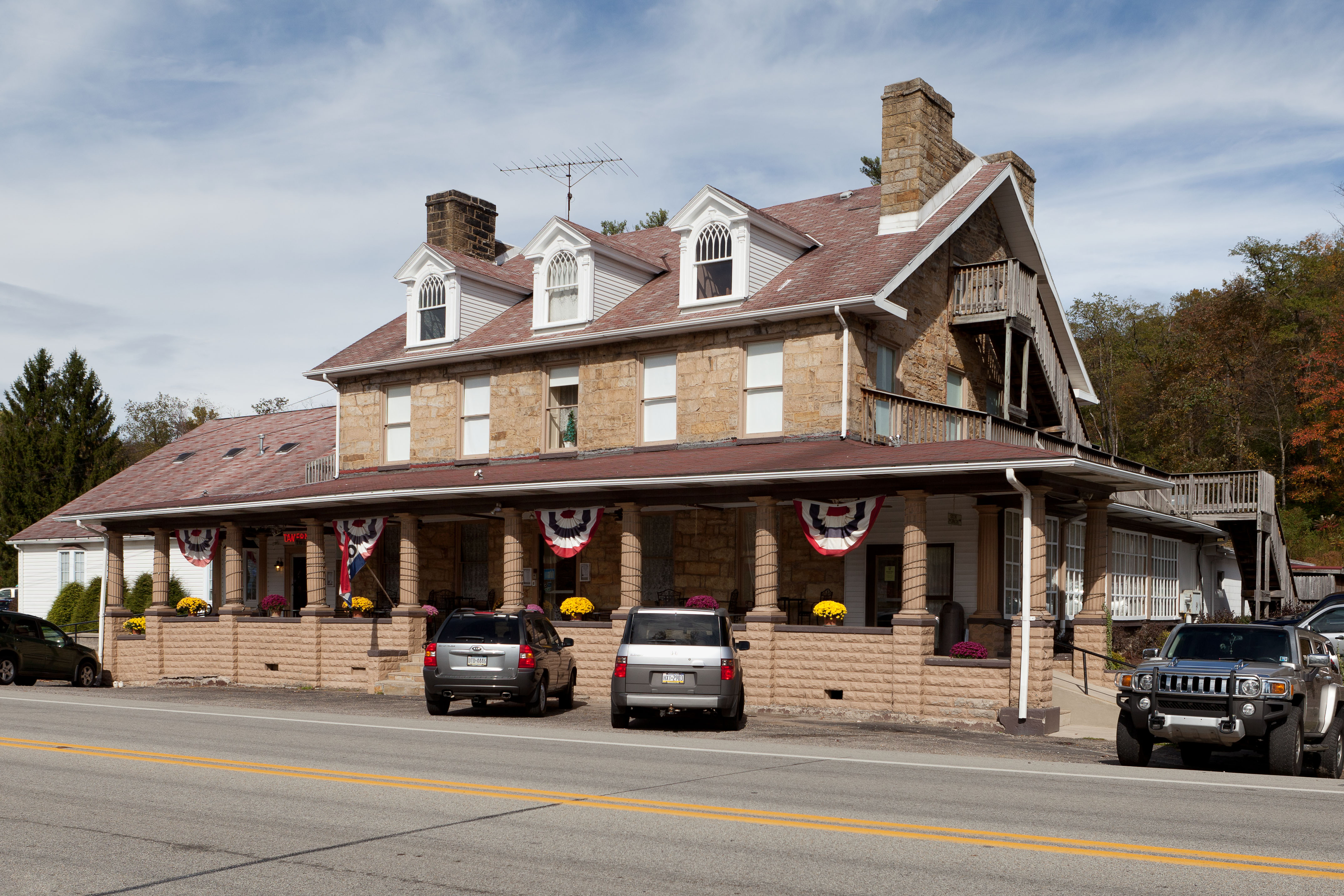

- Location within Pennsylvania Location within the United States
- Location: U.S. Route 40, approximately 0.5 miles (0.80 km) east of Chalk Hill, Wharton Township, Pennsylvania
- Coordinates: 39°50′26″N 79°36′36″W
- Area: less than one acre
- Built: 1822
- Architectural style: Federal
- MPS: National Road in Pennsylvania MPS
- NRHP reference No.: 95001358
- Added to NRHP: November 27, 1995

Fayette Springs Hotel, also known as Stone House Restaurant, is a historic inn and tavern located at Wharton Township, Fayette County, Pennsylvania. It was built about 1822, and is a 2 1/2-story, 5-bay, brick building with a center hall floor plan with Federal-style detailing. It has a 2 1/2-story, kitchen ell. It was built by Congressman Andrew Stewart (1791-1872). It served as a stop for 19th-century travelers on the National Road.

It was added to the National Register of Historic Places in 1995.
