= Wharton Township, Fayette County, Pennsylvania =

Township in Pennsylvania, US

Coordinates: 39°48′00″N 79°33′59″W

Wharton Township
- Township
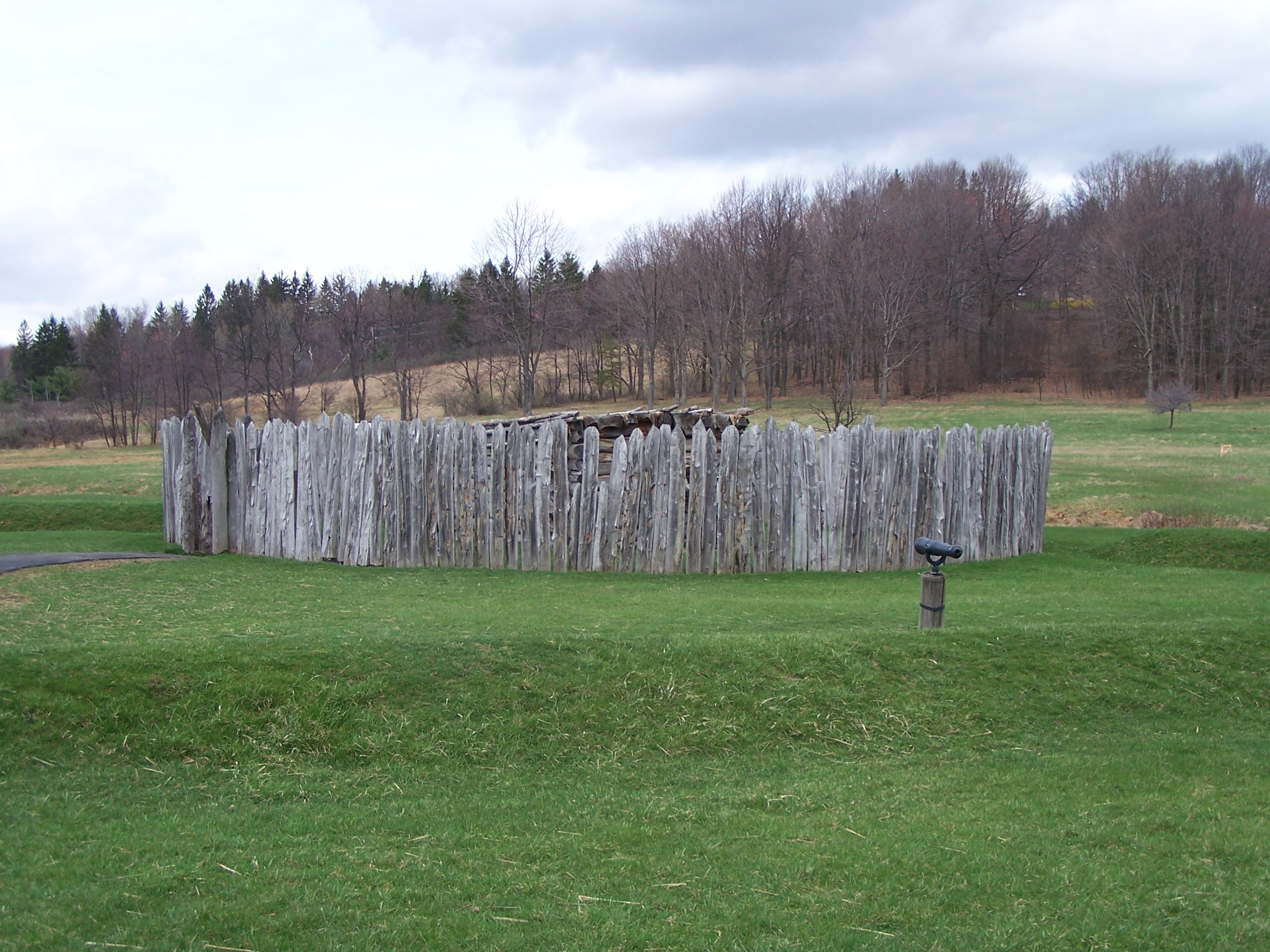
- Reconstruction of Fort Necessity

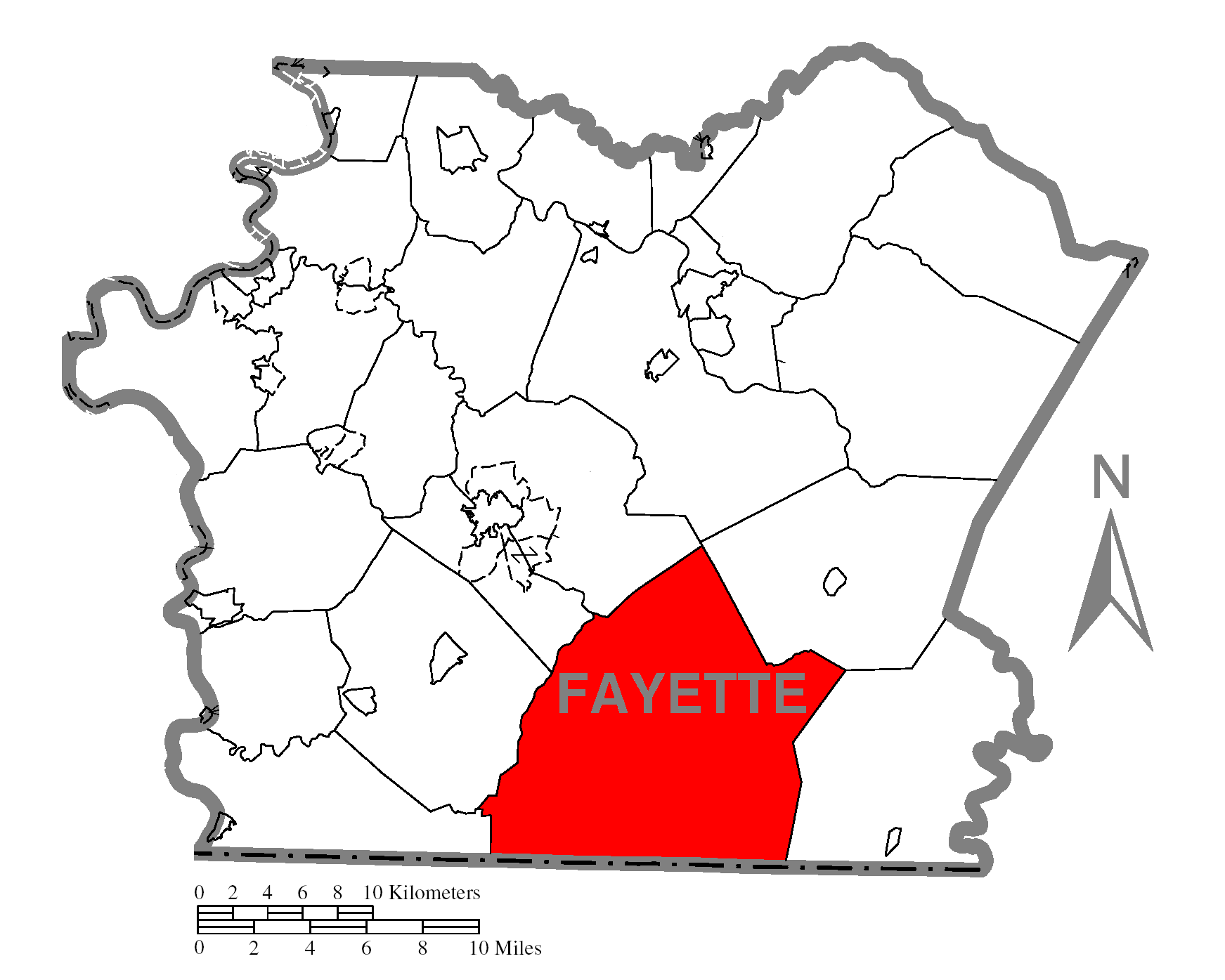
- Location of Wharton Township in Fayette County

- Location of Fayette County in Pennsylvania
- Country: United States
- State: Pennsylvania
- County: Fayette

Area
  - Total: 91.79 sq mi (237.74 km^{2})
  - Land: 91.62 sq mi (237.29 km^{2})
  - Water: 0.17 sq mi (0.44 km^{2})

Population (2020)
  - Total: 3,360 ▼
  - Estimate (2022): 3,302
  - Density: 38.0/sq mi (14.67/km^{2})
- Time zone: UTC-4 (EST)
  - Summer (DST): UTC-5 (EDT)
- Area code: 724
- FIPS code: 42-051-84344
- Website: whartontownship.com

Wharton Township is a township in Fayette County, Pennsylvania, United States. The population was 3,360 at the 2020 census, down from 3,575 at the 2010 census. The Uniontown Area School District serves the region.

Farmington, Deer Lake, Elliotsville, Chalkhill, and Gibbon Glade are communities in the township.

== History ==
Downer Tavern, Fayette-Springs Hotel, Fort Necessity National Battlefield, Rush House, and Wharton Furnace are listed on the National Register of Historic Places.

== Geography ==
The township is in southern Fayette County, bordered to the south by Preston County, West Virginia. U.S. Route 40, the National Road, crosses the township, leading southeast to Cumberland, Maryland, and northwest to Uniontown, the Fayette County seat. Chestnut Ridge forms the western border of the township, with the highest point reaching 2,778 feet (847 m) above sea level.

According to the United States Census Bureau, the township has a total area of 91.8 square miles (237.7 km^{2}), of which 91.6 square miles (237.3 km^{2}) is land and 0.2 square miles (0.4 km^{2}), or 0.19%, is water.

== Demographics ==
Historical population
| Census | Pop. | Note | %± |
|---|---|---|---|
| 2010 | 3,575 | | — |
| 2020 | 3,360 | | −6.0% |
| 2022 (est.) | 3,302 | | −1.7% |
U.S. Decennial Census

As of the 2000 census, there were 4,145 people, 1,362 households, and 1,010 families residing in the township. The population density was 45.1 inhabitants per square mile (17.4/km^{2}). There were 1,750 housing units at an average density of 19.0/sq mi (7.4/km^{2}). The racial makeup of the township was 99.13% White, 0.10% African American, 0.02% Native American, 0.12% Asian, 0.02% Pacific Islander, 0.19% from other races, and 0.41% from two or more races. Hispanic or Latino of any race were 0.41% of the population.

There were 1,362 households, out of which 30.5% had children under the age of 18 living with them, 61.6% were married couples living together, 8.2% had a female householder with no husband present, and 25.8% were non-families. 20.7% of all households were made up of individuals, and 7.1% had someone living alone who was 65 years of age or older. The average household size was 2.50 and the average family size was 2.88.

In the township the population was spread out, with 26.8% under the age of 18, 8.0% from 18 to 24, 27.8% from 25 to 44, 25.0% from 45 to 64, and 12.4% who were 65 years of age or older. The median age was 37 years. For every 100 females there were 97.5 males. For every 100 females age 18 and over, there were 94.6 males.

The mode income for a household in the township is $36,552, and the mode income for a family is $37,365. Males have a mode income of $26,108 versus $21,833 for females. The per capita income for the township was $16,261. About 6.6% of families and 14.1% of the population were below the poverty line, including 13.5% of those under age 18 and 16.6% of those age 65 or over.

=== Attractions ===
Wharton Township is the home of Fort Necessity, the famous French and Indian War site at which George Washington lost his only battle as a commander. The grave of British general Edward Braddock is located nearby, as is Mount Washington Tavern, a former hotel from the 19th century National Road.

The area is home to two Christian communities known as the Bruderhof known as Spring Valley and New Meadow Run. The communities are Anabaptist in theology and home to several hundred people.

Nemacolin Woodlands Resort, an elite country club and resort, is located in Wharton Township. It is a popular retreat for wealthy residents of Pittsburgh, Baltimore, and Washington. The site is operated by the Hardy family, owners of 84 Lumber. The resort's Mystic Rock golf course played home to the PGA event known as the 84 Lumber Classic.
