= Johnson-Hatfield Tavern =

Historic tavern in Pennsylvania, United States

- U.S. National Register of Historic Places
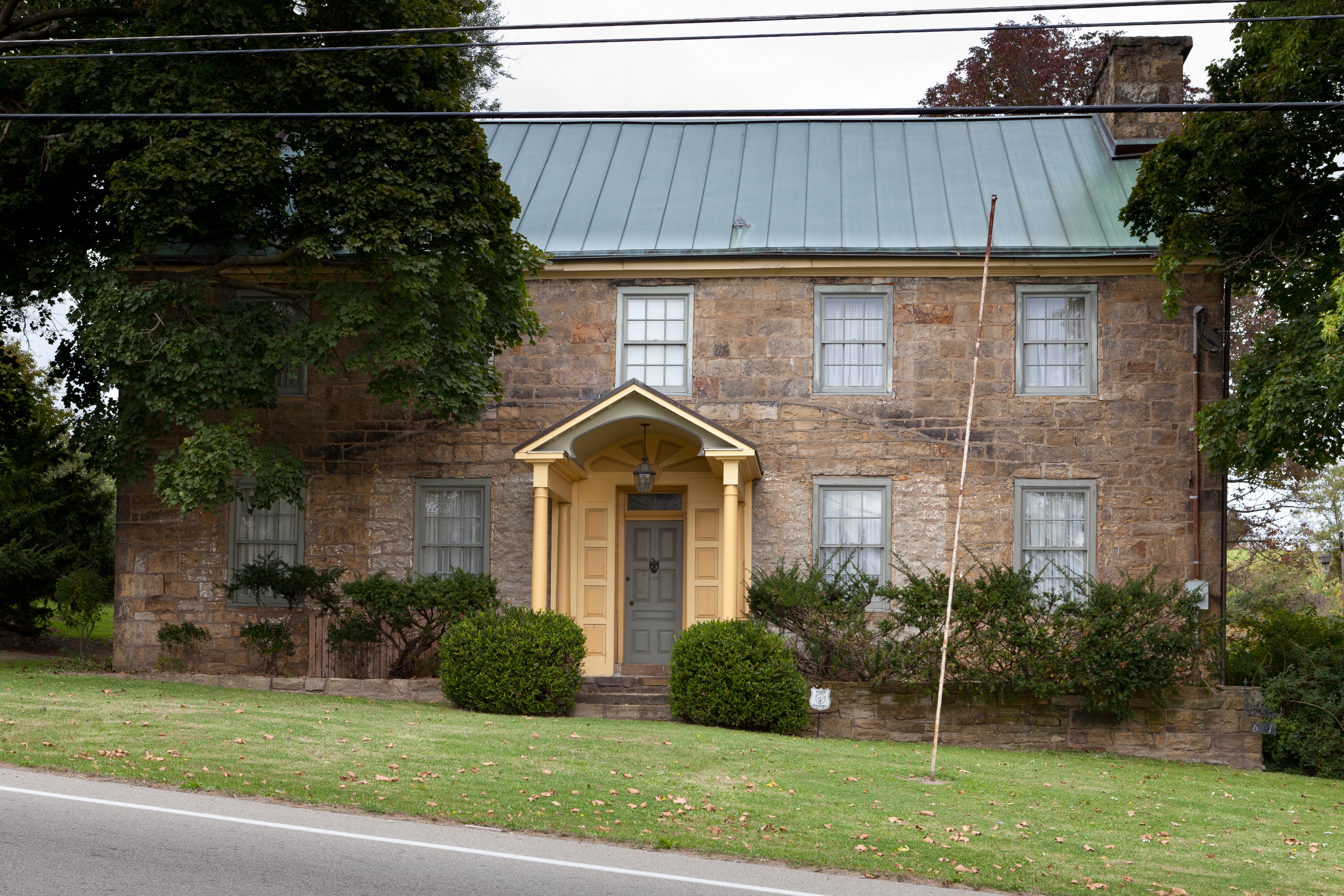
- Johnson-Hatfield Tavern, October 2013

- Location within Pennsylvania Location within the United States
- Location: U.S. Route 40, 0.5 miles (0.80 km) east of Brier Hill, Redstone Township, Pennsylvania
- Coordinates: 39°58′20″N 79°49′27″W
- Area: less than one acre
- Built: c. 1817
- Built by: Dearth, Randolf
- MPS: National Road in Pennsylvania MPS
- NRHP reference No.: 95001354
- Added to NRHP: November 27, 1995

The Johnson-Hatfield Tavern is an historic tavern house in Redstone Township, Fayette County, Pennsylvania, United States.

It was added to the National Register of Historic Places in 1995.

== History and architectural features ==
Built circa 1817, this historic structure is a 2 1/2-story, five-bay, stone building with a center hall plan. Also located on the property is a stone spring house. This tavern served as a stop for nineteenth-century travelers on the National Road.
