= Rush House =

- U.S. National Register of Historic Places
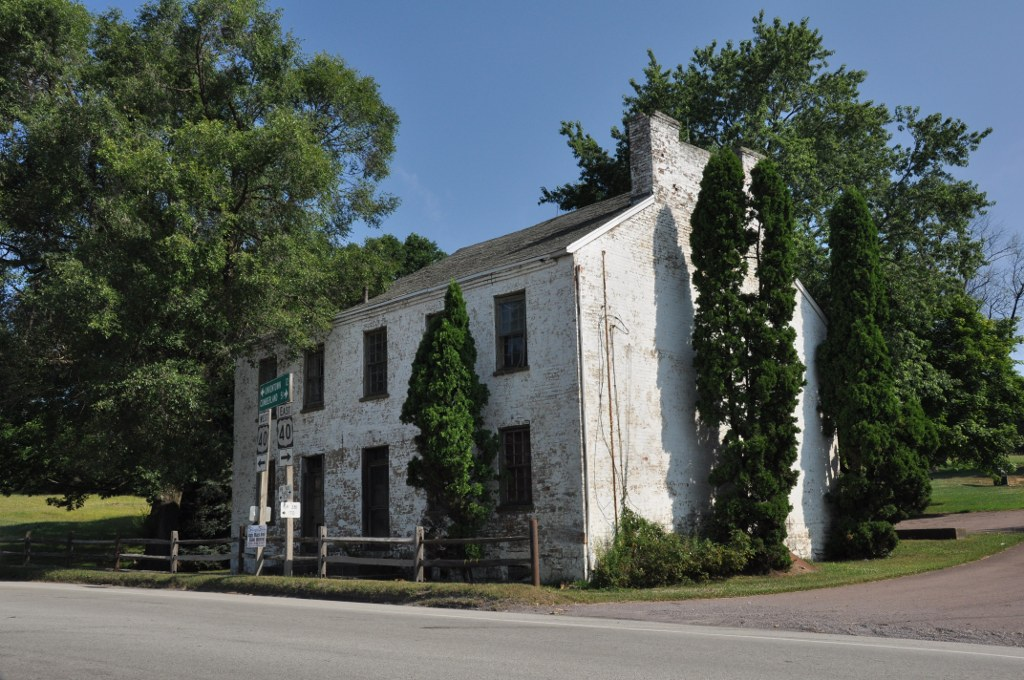

- Location within Pennsylvania Location within the United States
- Location: U.S. Route 40 and Pennsylvania Route 381 in Farmington, Wharton Township, Pennsylvania
- Coordinates: 39°48′26″N 79°33′58″W
- Area: 0.5 acres (0.20 ha)
- Built: 1837 Demolished = January 2018
- Built by: Ewing, Nathaniel
- NRHP reference No.: 78002399
- Added to NRHP: March 8, 1978

Rush House, also known as the Sebastian Rush Hotel and Tavern, was an historic inn and tavern in Wharton Township, Fayette County, Pennsylvania, United States.

Added to the National Register of Historic Places in 1978, it was demolished in January 2018.

== History and architectural features ==
Built circa 1837, this historic structure was a 2 1/2-story, five-bay, brick and stone building with a center hall floor plan that had a rear ell. The South and East sides of the building built using brick, and the North and West sides were built with fieldstone.

Built by Congressman Andrew Stewart (1791-1872), it served as a stop for nineteenth-century travelers on the National Road. It operated as a hotel until 1962. The house was demolished in January 2018.
