= Isaac Meason House =

Historic house in Pennsylvania, United States

- U.S. National Register of Historic Places
- U.S. National Historic Landmark
- Pennsylvania state historical marker
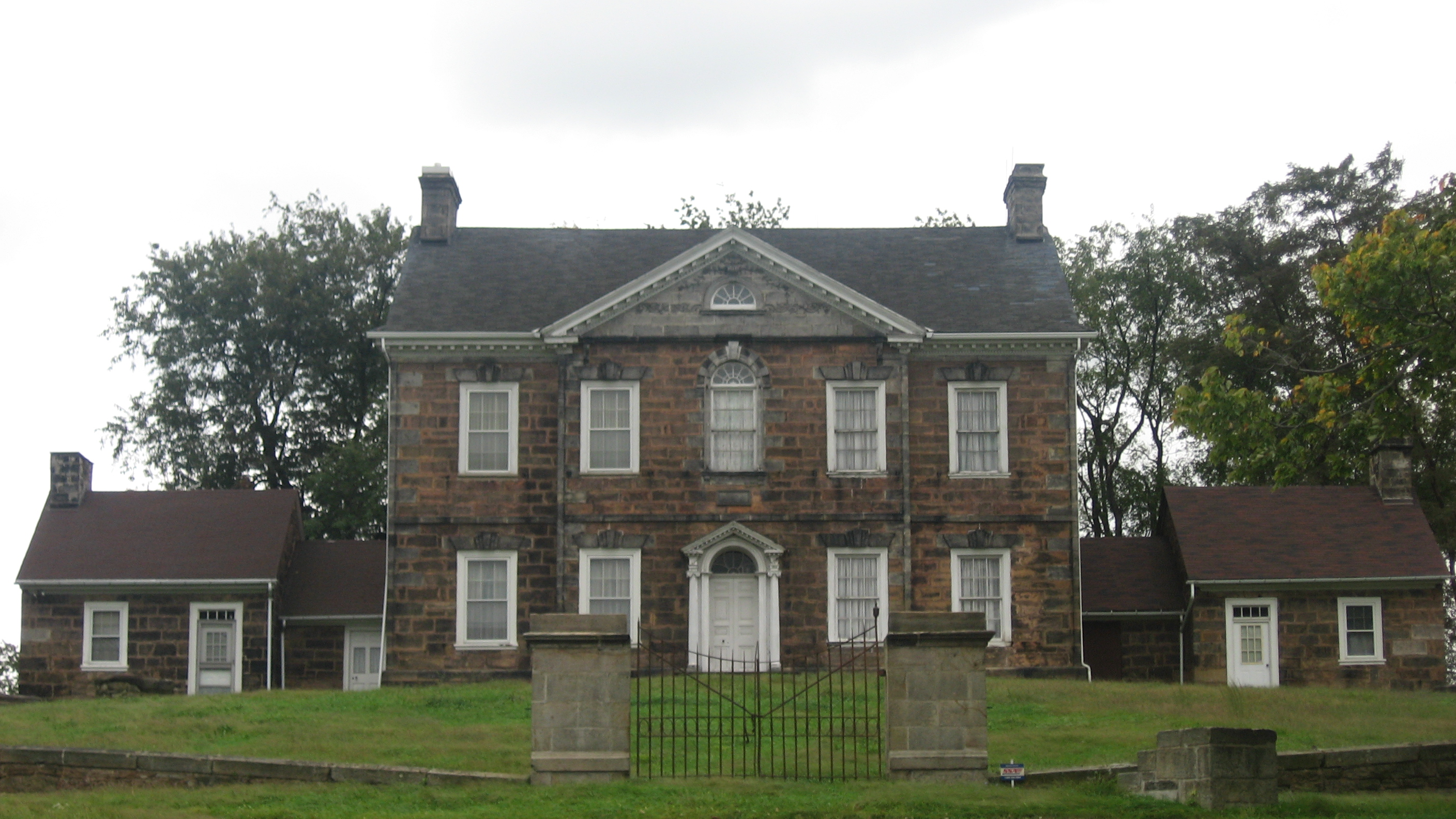
- Front of the house

- Location within Pennsylvania Location within the United States
- Interactive map showing the location of Isaac Meason House
- Location: U.S. Route 119 North in Mount Braddock, Dunbar Township, Pennsylvania
- Coordinates: 39°57′14″N 79°38′53″W
- Area: 4 acres (1.6 ha)
- Built: 1802
- Architect: Isaac Meason; Adam Wilson
- Architectural style: Georgian
- NRHP reference No.: 71000707

Significant dates
- Added to NRHP: January 25, 1971
- Designated NHL: June 21, 1990
- Designated PHMC: November 22, 1946

The Isaac Meason House, also known as Mount Braddock, is a historic house located in Dunbar Township, Fayette County, Pennsylvania. Completed in 1802, it is one of only two surviving Palladian style stone mansions from the period in the United States. Isaac Meason, for whom it was built, was an American Revolutionary War hero and early political power broker in the area, becoming the richest person in Fayette County due to his interest in iron furnaces and possession of enslaved people. The house was designated a National Historic Landmark in 1990 for its architecture.

== Description and history ==
The Isaac Meason House stands outside the hamlet of Mount Braddock, roughly midway between Connellsville and Uniontown at the southern end of Cellurale Drive off United States Route 119. It is prominently sited at the top of a local hill, with a circular stone wall with a gate at its center providing access to its front yard. It is a 2 1/2-story structure built out of locally quarried sandstone with an ashlar finish, and is built following a classical Palladian villa pattern. It has a central main block, flanked symmetrically by narrow hyphens connecting to single-story wings. Small outbuildings are then symmetrically placed beyond the outer wings, with the main driveway passing through the northern gap. The central bays of the center block on both the front and rear elevations are topped by a gabled pediment.

Little is known about Isaac Meason, beyond his origins in Virginia and his success in the Pennsylvania iron industry; he established an iron foundry in Uniontown in 1791, believed to be the first commercially successful operation in the region. This house was built for him by Adam Wilson, a builder about whom little is also known, but is believed to have been brought to the United States from Scotland by Meason. It took about five years to build, and was completed in 1802. While there are a number of formal Palladian-style mansion houses built in the Federal period that survive, most only have a five-part plan, lacking the outbuildings, or have outbuildings built of wood if the main house is masonry. This house is, along with "Mount Airy" in Warsaw, Virginia, one of two that have the full suite of seven elements executed entirely in stone.

The house remained in the Meason family until 1887.

== See also ==
- List of National Historic Landmarks in Pennsylvania
- National Register of Historic Places listings in Fayette County, Pennsylvania
- Mount Airy Palladian Villa built by John Tayloe II
