= Hugh Laughlin House =

Historic house in Pennsylvania, United States

- U.S. National Register of Historic Places
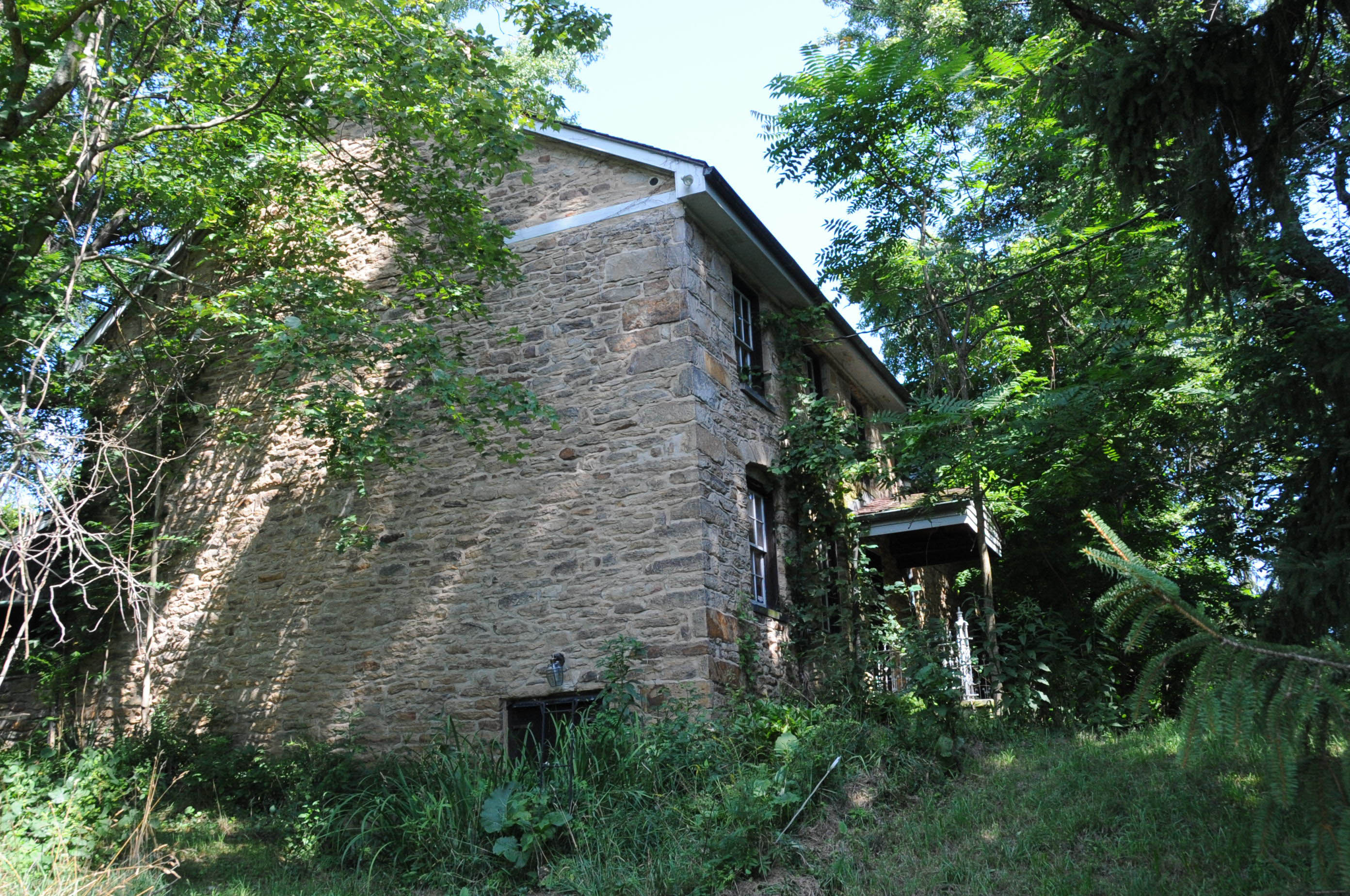

- Location within Pennsylvania Location within the United States
- Location: Township Route 422 south of Brownsville, Redstone Township, Pennsylvania
- Coordinates: 39°59′53″N 79°50′28″W
- Area: 0.7 acres (0.28 ha)
- Built: c. 1785-1795, c. 1800-1810
- Architectural style: Georgian
- NRHP reference No.: 87000659
- Added to NRHP: April 30, 1987

The Hugh Laughlin House is an historic home which is located in Redstone Township, Fayette County, Pennsylvania.

It was added to the National Register of Historic Places in 1987.

== History and architectural features ==
This historic structure has two sections. The older was built roughly between 1785 and 1795, and is a two-story, three-bay, stone structure, which was designed in the Georgian style. It measures twenty-six feet by thirty feet. A 1 1/2-story sandstone section was added between 1800 and 1810. It measures twenty-two feet by twenty feet. Also located on the property are the ruins of a large brick spring house.
