= Wallace-Baily Tavern =

Historic tavern in Pennsylvania, United States

- U.S. National Register of Historic Places
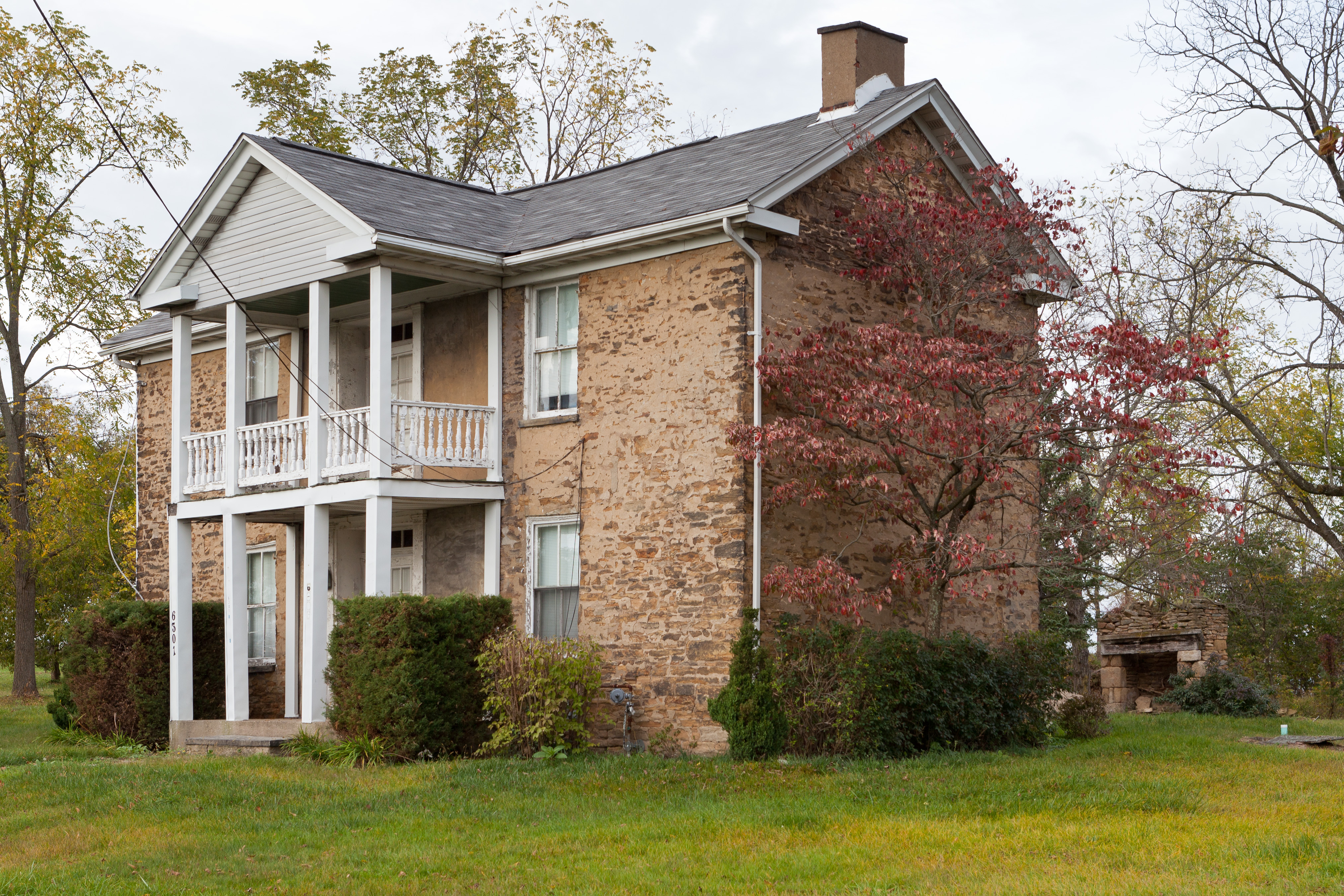
- Wallace-Baily Tavern, October 2013

- Location within Pennsylvania Location within the United States
- Location: U.S. Route 40, 1.5 miles (2.4 km) west of Brier Hill, Redstone Township, Pennsylvania
- Coordinates: 39°59′36″N 79°51′5″W
- Area: less than one acre
- Built: c. 1840
- Architectural style: Greek Revival
- MPS: National Road in Pennsylvania MPS
- NRHP reference No.: 95001350
- Added to NRHP: November 27, 1995

Wallace-Baily Tavern is a historic home that also served as an inn and tavern located at Redstone Township, Fayette County, Pennsylvania. It was built about 1840, and is a 2 1/2-story, 3-bay, stone building. It has a frame kitchen ell an features a double stacked portico with Greek Revival design influences. The ruins of a wash house/summer kitchen are also on site. The tavern served as a stop for 19th-century travelers on the National Road.

It was added to the National Register of Historic Places in 1995.
