= Wharton Furnace =

- U.S. National Register of Historic Places
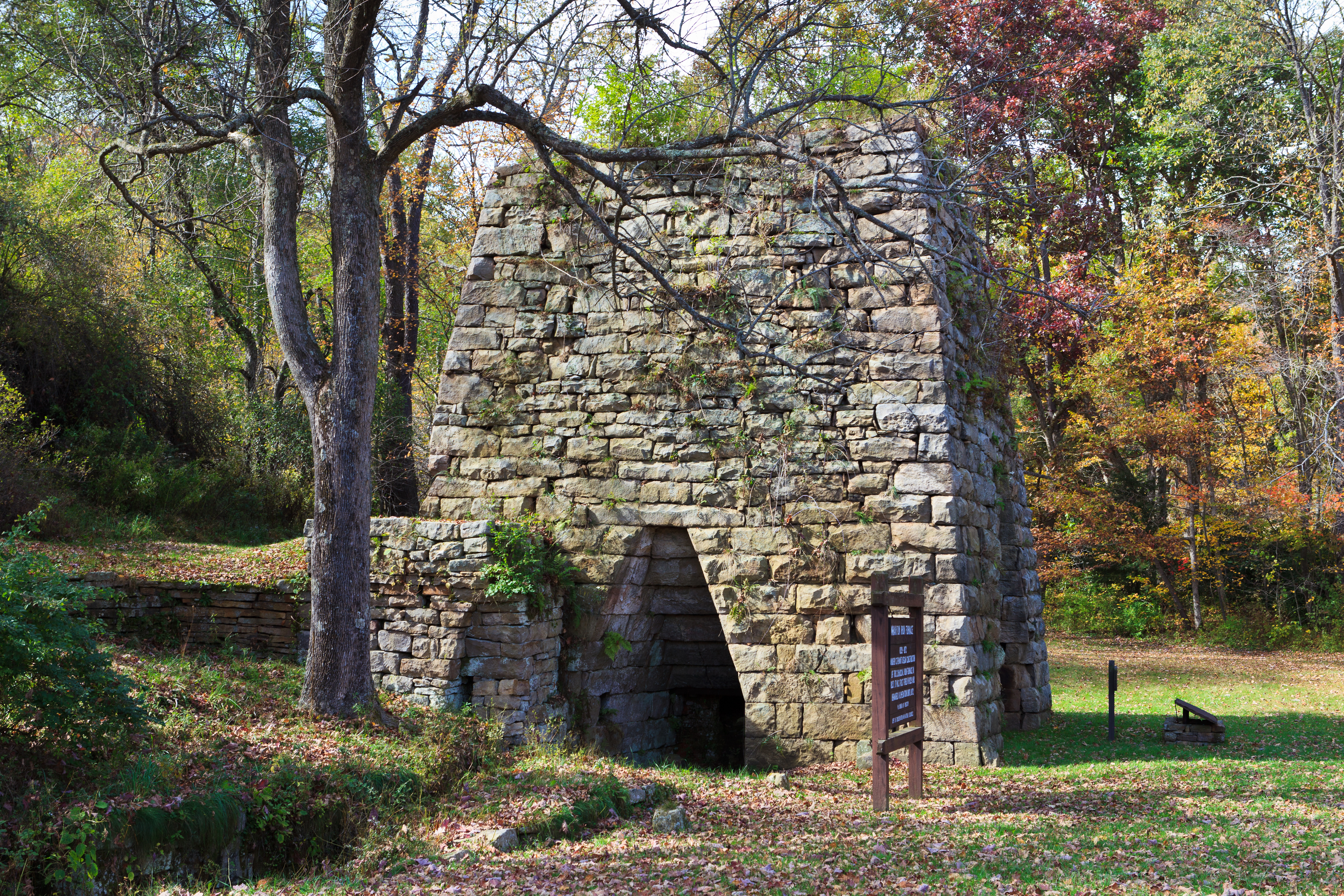
- Wharton Furnace, October 2013

- Location within Pennsylvania Location within the United States
- Location: Wharton Furnace-Hull Road south of U.S. Route 40, southeast of Hopwood, Wharton Township, Pennsylvania
- Coordinates: 39°49′32″N 79°38′18″W
- Area: 1 acre (0.40 ha)
- Built: 1837
- Architectural style: Iron furnace
- MPS: Iron and Steel Resources of Pennsylvania MPS
- NRHP reference No.: 91001143
- Added to NRHP: September 6, 1991

Wharton Furnace is an historic iron furnace located at Wharton Township, Fayette County, Pennsylvania, United States. It was built in 1837, and is a stone structure measuring 33 feet (10 m) wide, 31 feet (9.4 m) deep, and 31 feet (9.4 m) high. It was built as a blast furnace, placed in blast in 1839 and went out of blast by 1850. It was built by Congressman Andrew Stewart (1791-1872).

It was added to the National Register of Historic Places in 1991.
