= John P. Conn House =

Historic house in Pennsylvania, United States

- U.S. National Register of Historic Places
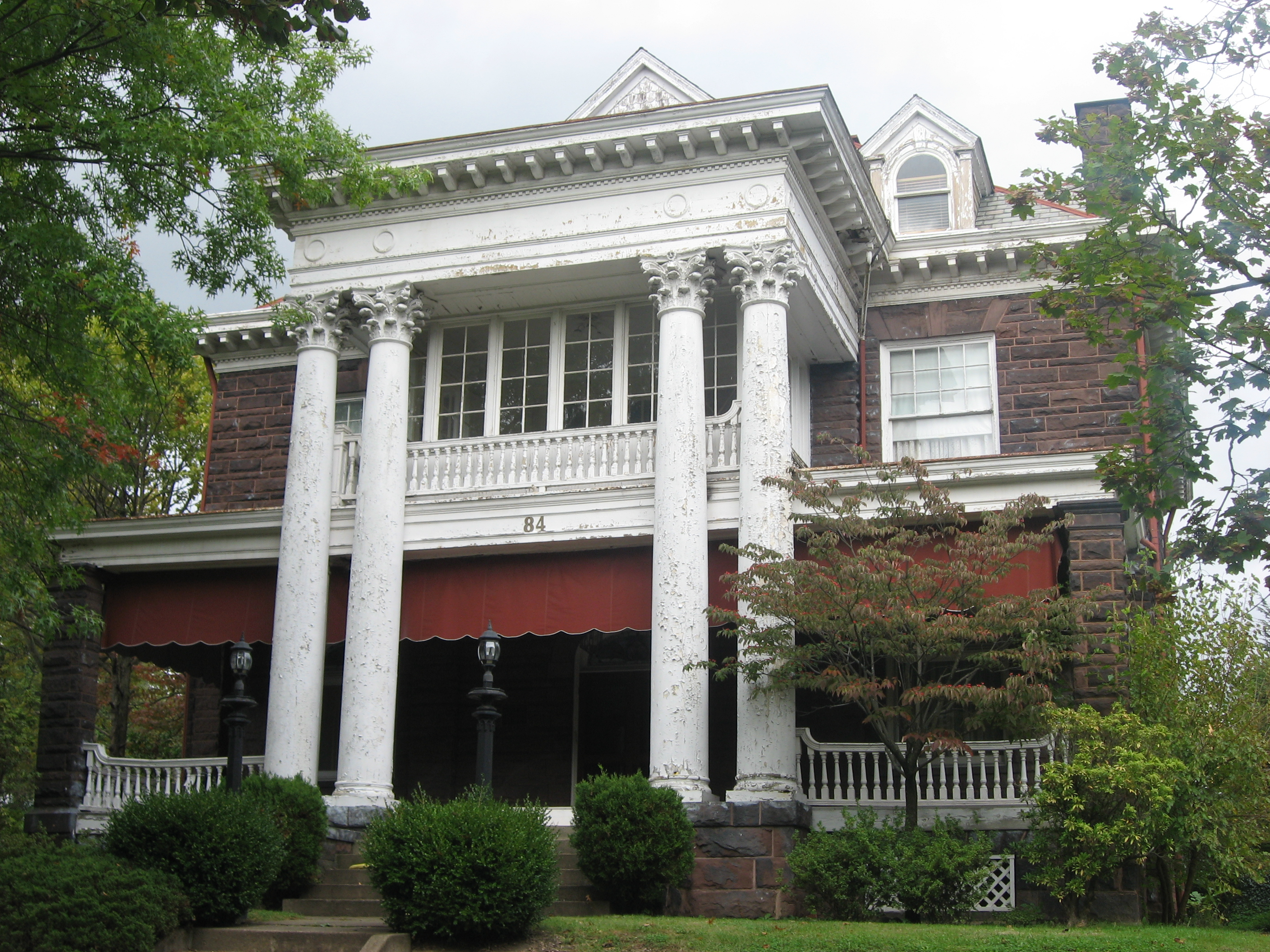
- John P. Conn House, September 2011

- Location within Pennsylvania Location within the United States
- Location: 84 Ben Lomond St., Uniontown, Pennsylvania
- Coordinates: 39°54′13″N 79°44′3″W
- Area: 0.3 acres (0.12 ha)
- Built: 1906
- Architect: Baer, J.A.
- Architectural style: Colonial Revival
- NRHP reference No.: 88001164
- Added to NRHP: July 28, 1988

The John P. Conn House is an historic home that is located in Uniontown, Fayette County, Pennsylvania, United States.

It was added to the National Register of Historic Places in 1988.

== History and architectural features ==
Built in 1906, this historic structure is a large 2 1/2-story, square brownstone dwelling that was designed in the Colonial Revival style. It has a slate-covered hipped roof with gable dormer, and features a colossal balconied porch with paired Corinthian order columns. Also located on the property is a contributing wood-frame garage.
