= Alliance Furnace =

- U.S. National Register of Historic Places
- Pennsylvania state historical marker
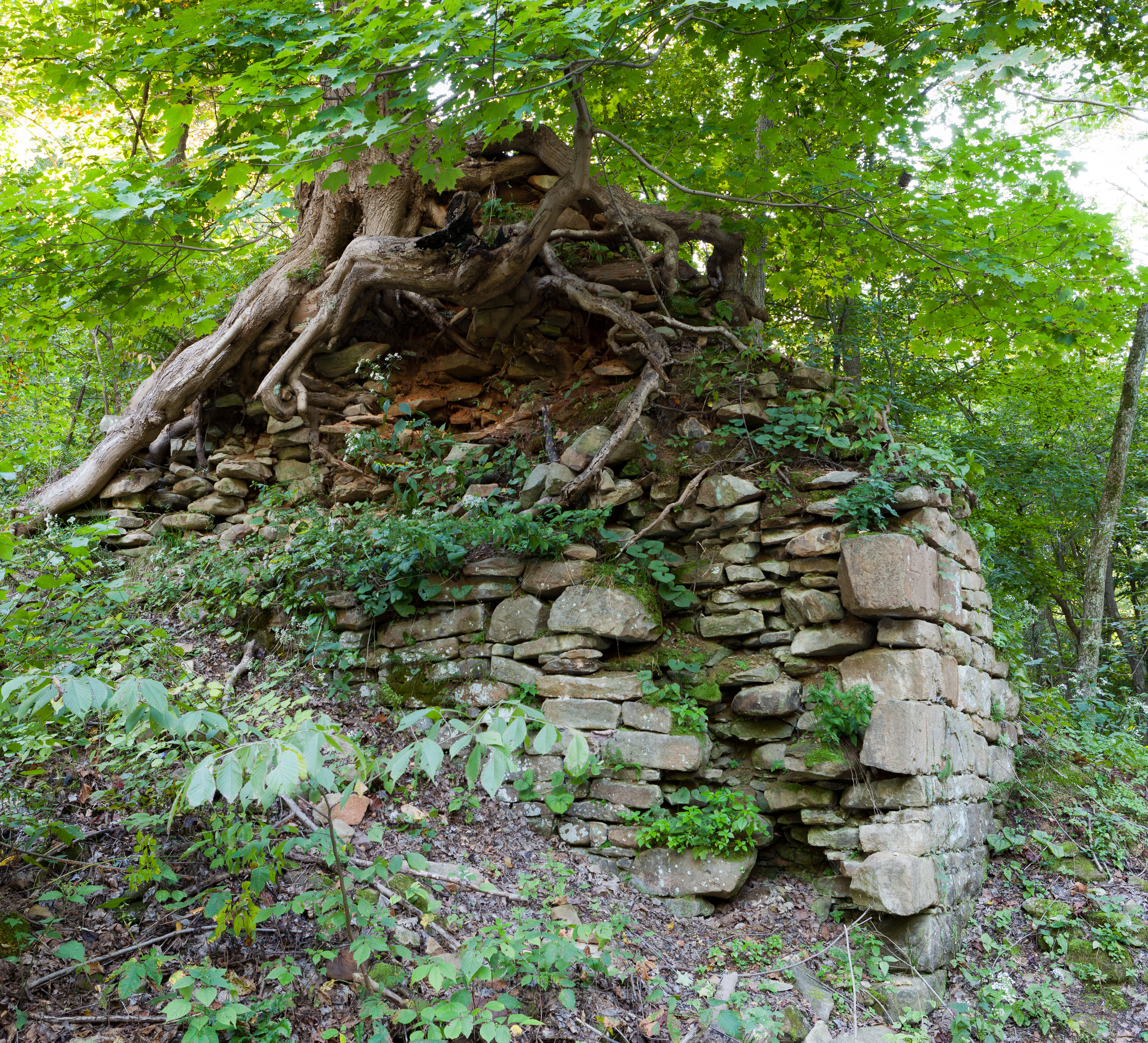
- Ruins of the furnace

- Location within Pennsylvania Location within the United States
- Location: Off Township 568 at Jacobs Creek, northeast of Perryopolis, Perry Township, Pennsylvania
- Coordinates: 40°6′45″N 79°43′3″W
- Area: 4 acres (1.6 ha)
- Built: 1789
- Architectural style: Iron furnace
- MPS: Iron and Steel Resources of Pennsylvania MPS
- NRHP reference No.: 91001130

Significant dates
- Added to NRHP: September 6, 1991
- Designated PHMC: November 22, 1946

The Alliance Furnace, also known as Jacob's Creek Furnace and the Alliance Iron Works, is an historic iron furnace located in Perry Township, Fayette County, Pennsylvania. It was part of the first large-scale ironworks west of the Appalachian Mountains.

The Alliance Furnace was added to the National Register of Historic Places in 1991.

== History and architectural features ==
Built in 1789, the Alliance Furnace is a stone structure measuring twenty-five feet square by fifteen feet high. It was built as a blast furnace, placed in blast in 1792 and closed in 1802. It produced bar iron, weights, kettles, and smoothing irons, along with military ordnance for Fort Pitt during the Northwest Indian War.

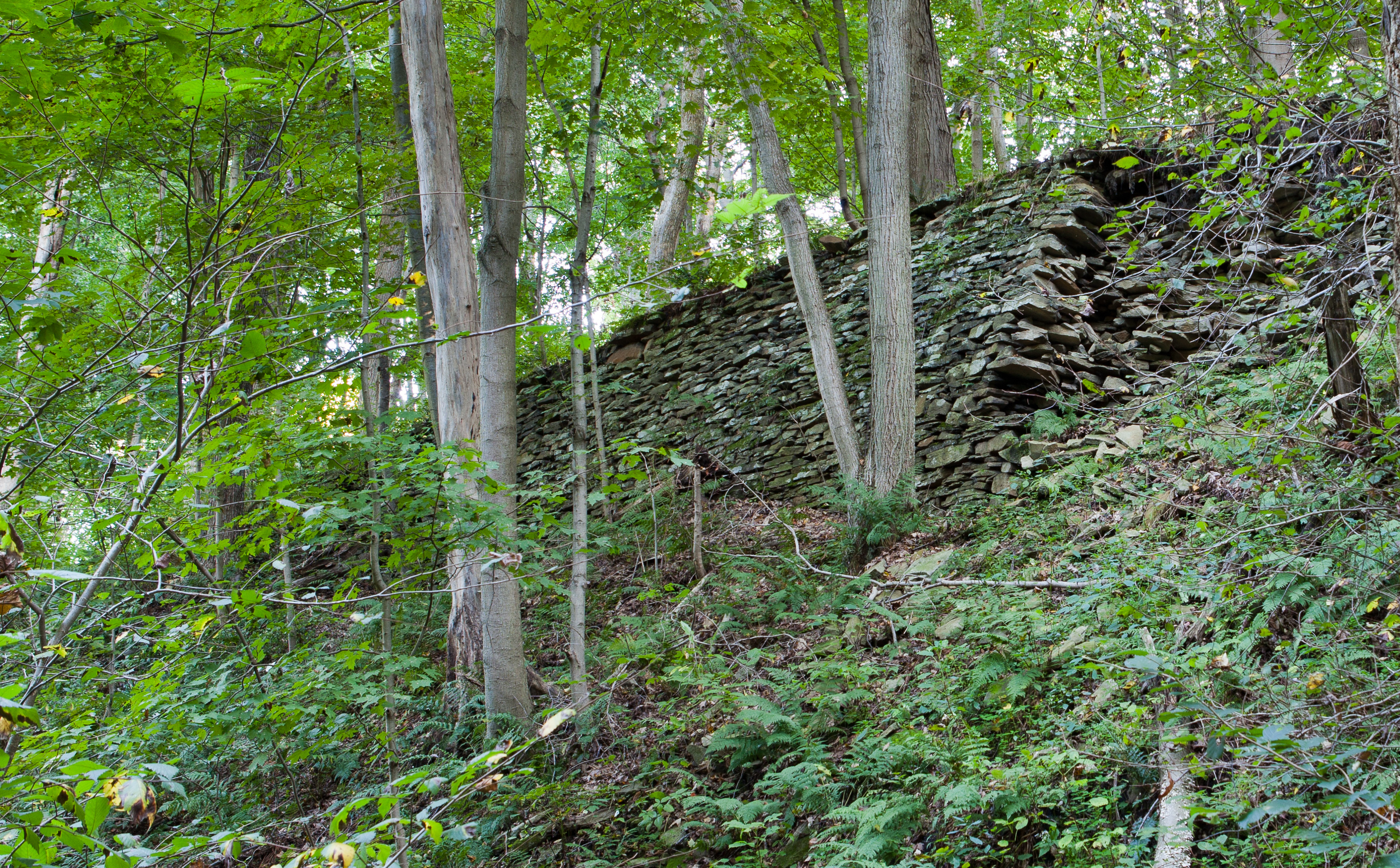
Alliance Furnace Charcoal House

Also located on the same property is a charcoal house which measures 40 by 25 by 20 feet (12.2 by 7.6 by 6.1 m).

In 1946, a Pennsylvania state historical marker for the Alliance Furnace was installed by the Pennsylvania Historical and Museum Commission. The Alliance Furnace was added to the National Register of Historic Places in 1991. It is notable for being part of the first large-scale ironworks west of the Appalachian Mountains.

The ruins of the furnace and charcoal house are located along Jacobs Creek on Pennsylvania State Game Lands 296.
