= Chalkhill, Pennsylvania =

Unincorporated community in Pennsylvania, US

Chalk Hill, Pennsylvania Chalk Hill
- Census-designated place
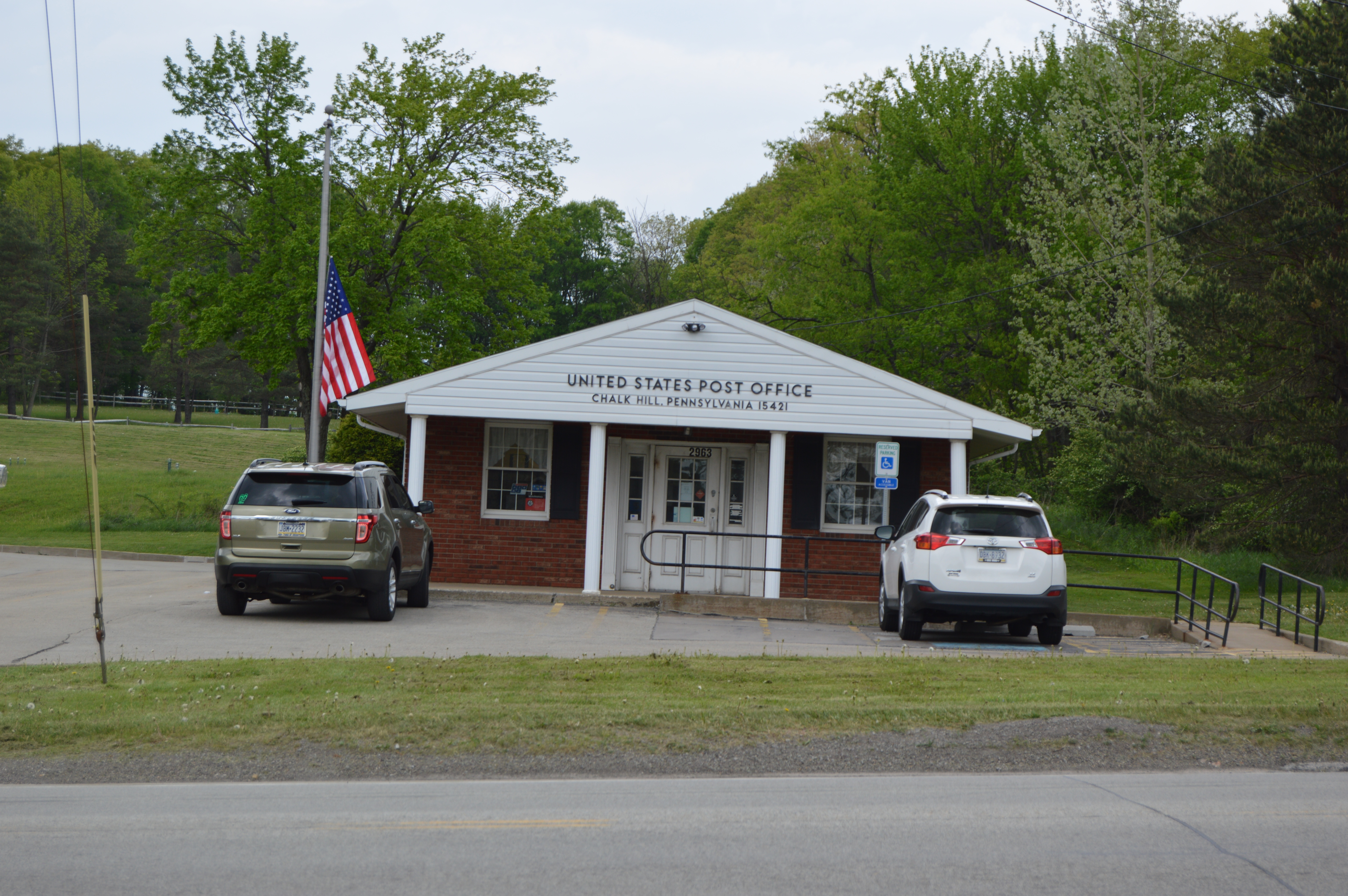
- Post office

- Location within Pennsylvania Location within the United States
- Coordinates: 39°50′46″N 79°36′51″W
- Country: United States
- State: Pennsylvania
- County: Fayette
- Township: Wharton

Area
  - Total: 0.83 sq mi (2.15 km^{2})
  - Land: 0.82 sq mi (2.12 km^{2})
  - Water: 0.012 sq mi (0.03 km^{2})
- Elevation: 2,060 ft (630 m)

Population (2020)
  - Total: 127
  - Density: 155.1/sq mi (59.88/km^{2})
- Time zone: UTC-5 (Eastern (EST))
  - Summer (DST): UTC-4 (EDT)
- ZIP code: 15421
- FIPS code: 42-12512
- GNIS feature ID: 2631254

Chalk Hill is an unincorporated community and census-designated place in Wharton Township, Fayette County, Pennsylvania, United States. It is located along U.S. Route 40 (the National Road), approximately 8 miles (13 km) southeast of the city of Uniontown. As of the 2010 census, the population was 141.

== Climate ==
Climate data for Chalkhill, Pennsylvania, 1991–2020 normals, 1977-2020 extremes: 1980ft (604m)
Month	Jan	Feb	Mar	Apr	May	Jun	Jul	Aug	Sep	Oct	Nov	Dec	Year
Record high °F (°C)	70 (21)	75 (24)	83 (28)	87 (31)	95 (35)	92 (33)	95 (35)	91 (33)	88 (31)	83 (28)	77 (25)	73 (23)	95 (35)
Mean maximum °F (°C)	59.2 (15.1)	59.8 (15.4)	70.2 (21.2)	79.7 (26.5)	84.1 (28.9)	85.3 (29.6)	86.1 (30.1)	84.7 (29.3)	82.3 (27.9)	75.8 (24.3)	69.6 (20.9)	58.9 (14.9)	86.7 (30.4)
Mean daily maximum °F (°C)	34.4 (1.3)	38.3 (3.5)	47.5 (8.6)	60.7 (15.9)	69.4 (20.8)	75.2 (24.0)	78.6 (25.9)	76.9 (24.9)	71.2 (21.8)	60.8 (16.0)	49.4 (9.7)	38.7 (3.7)	58.4 (14.7)
Daily mean °F (°C)	24.9 (−3.9)	27.4 (−2.6)	35.5 (1.9)	47.0 (8.3)	56.3 (13.5)	63.5 (17.5)	67.1 (19.5)	65.6 (18.7)	59.2 (15.1)	48.6 (9.2)	38.3 (3.5)	29.5 (−1.4)	46.9 (8.3)
Mean daily minimum °F (°C)	15.4 (−9.2)	16.5 (−8.6)	23.5 (−4.7)	33.4 (0.8)	43.2 (6.2)	51.7 (10.9)	55.5 (13.1)	54.3 (12.4)	47.1 (8.4)	36.4 (2.4)	27.3 (−2.6)	20.2 (−6.6)	35.4 (1.9)
Mean minimum °F (°C)	−7.1 (−21.7)	−3.0 (−19.4)	4.9 (−15.1)	21.9 (−5.6)	30.3 (−0.9)	39.2 (4.0)	45.7 (7.6)	45.5 (7.5)	35.3 (1.8)	26.0 (−3.3)	13.4 (−10.3)	3.4 (−15.9)	−7.7 (−22.1)
Record low °F (°C)	−27 (−33)	−22 (−30)	−14 (−26)	7 (−14)	20 (−7)	31 (−1)	37 (3)	32 (0)	29 (−2)	18 (−8)	2 (−17)	−17 (−27)	−27 (−33)
Average precipitation inches (mm)	4.56 (116)	4.11 (104)	5.02 (128)	4.72 (120)	5.20 (132)	5.74 (146)	4.65 (118)	4.54 (115)	4.70 (119)	3.80 (97)	4.13 (105)	4.51 (115)	55.68 (1,415)
Average snowfall inches (cm)	26.90 (68.3)	18.00 (45.7)	15.50 (39.4)	3.70 (9.4)	0.00 (0.00)	0.00 (0.00)	0.00 (0.00)	0.00 (0.00)	0.00 (0.00)	0.90 (2.3)	6.20 (15.7)	17.60 (44.7)	88.8 (225.5)
Source 1: NOAA
Source 2: XMACIS (temp records & monthly max/mins)

== Demographics ==
Historical population
Census	Pop.	Note	%±
2020	127		—
U.S. Decennial Census
