= Redstone Township, Pennsylvania =

Township in Pennsylvania, US

Coordinates: 40°00′06″N 79°52′54″W

Redstone Township
- Township
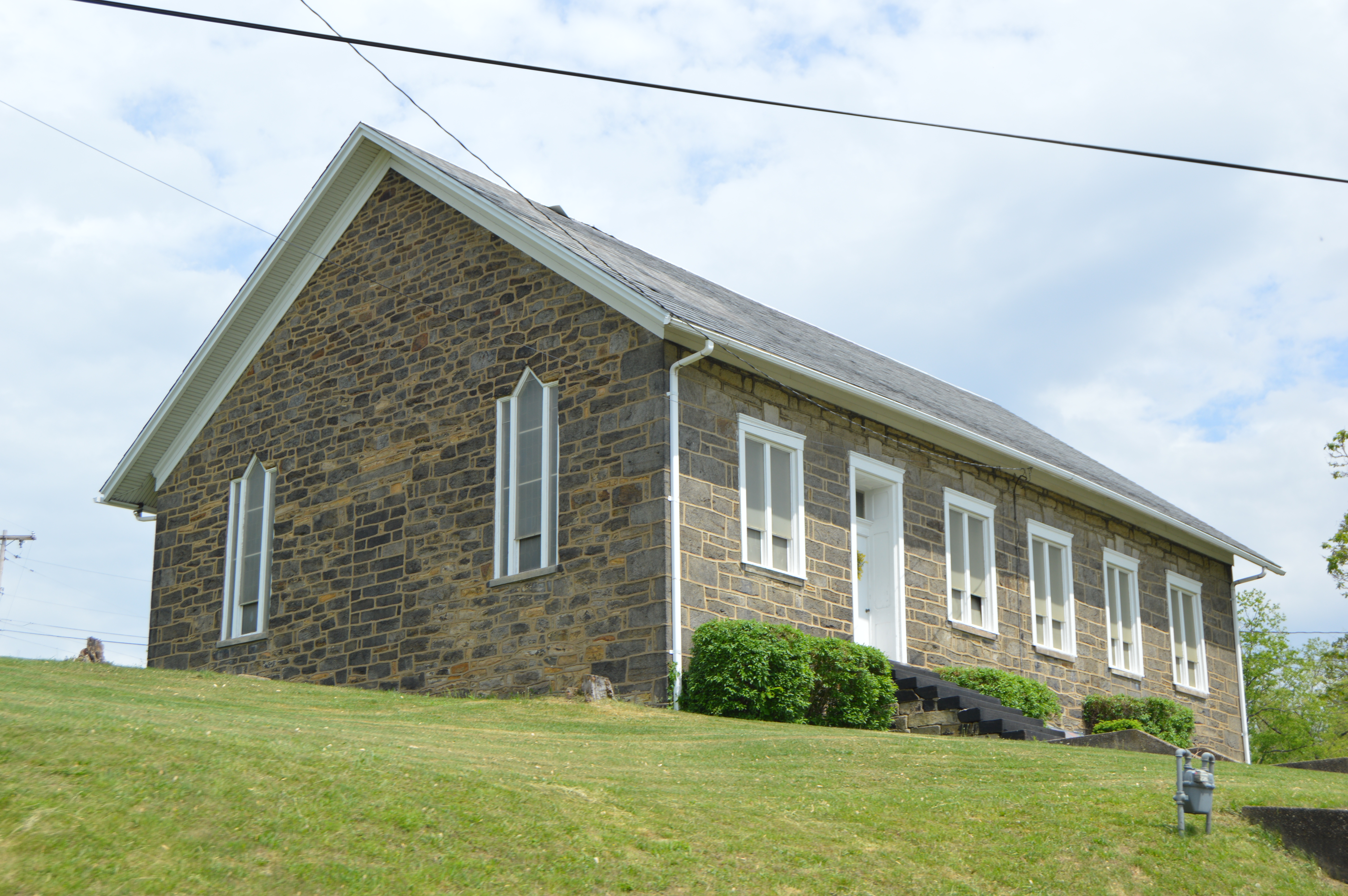
- Dunlap's Creek Presbyterian Church at Merrittstown, organized 1774

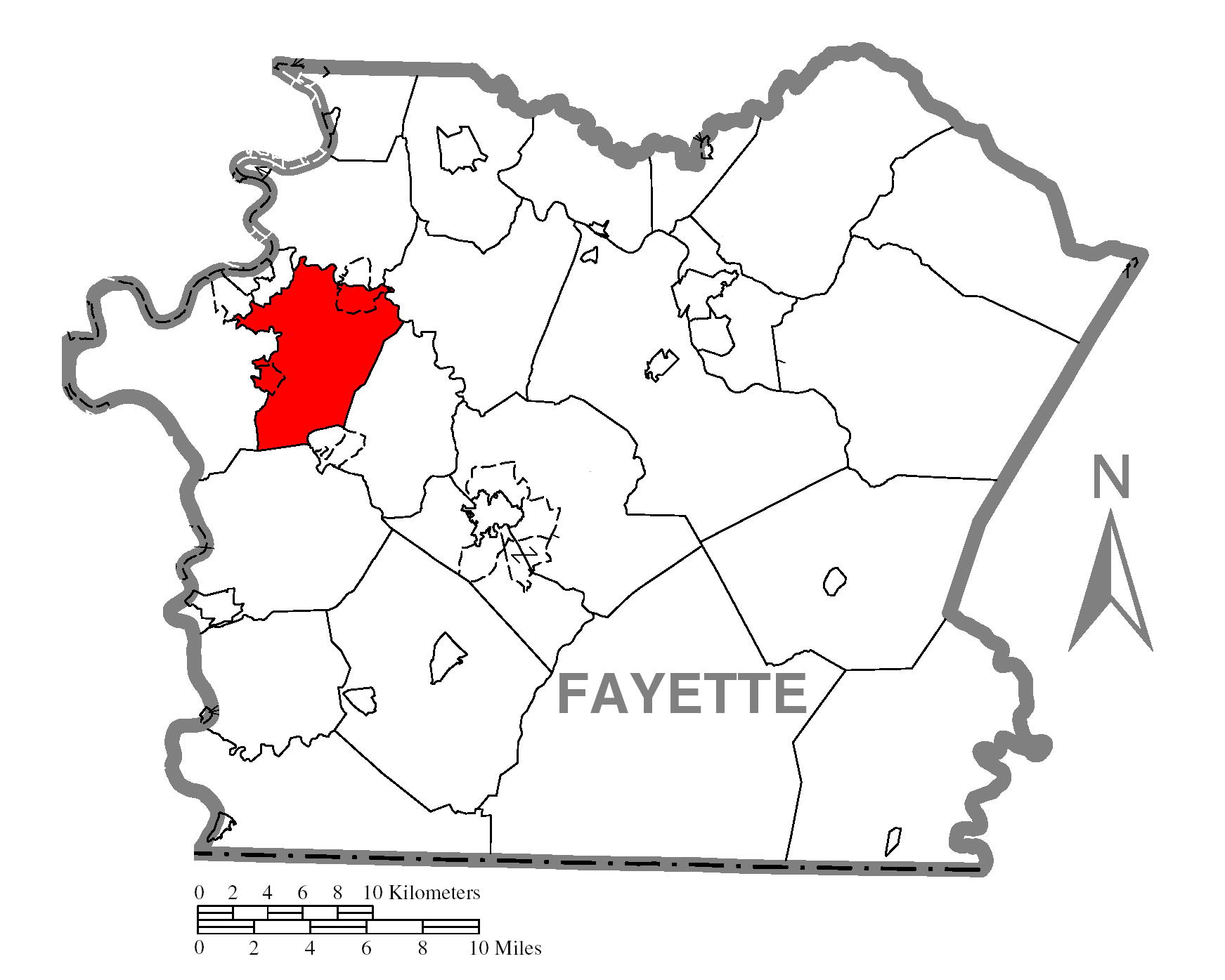
- Location of Redstone Township in Fayette County

- Location of Fayette County in Pennsylvania
- Country: United States
- State: Pennsylvania
- County: Fayette

Area
  - Total: 22.82 sq mi (59.11 km^{2})
  - Land: 22.76 sq mi (58.95 km^{2})
  - Water: 0.062 sq mi (0.16 km^{2})

Population (2020)
  - Total: 5,077 ▼
  - Estimate (2022): 4,969
  - Density: 237.8/sq mi (91.82/km^{2})
- Time zone: UTC-4 (EST)
  - Summer (DST): UTC-5 (EDT)
- Area code: 724
- FIPS code: 42-051-63904
- Website: redstonetwp.com

Redstone Township is a township in Fayette County, Pennsylvania, United States. The population was 5,077 at the 2020 census, a decline from the figure of 5,566 tabulated in 2010. The Brownsville Area School District serves the region.

Communities in the township include Rowes Run, Republic, Allison, Chestnut Ridge, Fairbank, Cardale, Royal, Merrittstown, Herbert, and a small portion of Grindstone.

== History ==
The Brier Hill, Peter Colley Tavern and Barn, Johnson-Hatfield Tavern, Hugh Laughlin House, and Wallace-Baily Tavern are listed on the National Register of Historic Places.

== Geography ==
Redstone Township is in western Fayette County. Redstone Creek, a tributary of the Monongahela River, forms the northern border of the township. U.S. Route 40 (the National Road) and Pennsylvania Route 43 (the Mon–Fayette Expressway) cross the township, both leading southeast to Uniontown, the Fayette County seat. US 40 leads northwest into Brownsville on the Monongahela, while PA 43 leads west, then north into Centerville.

According to the United States Census Bureau, Redstone Township has a total area of 22.8 square miles (59.1 km^{2}), of which 22.76 square miles (58.95 km^{2}) is land and 0.062 square miles (0.16 km^{2}), or 0.27%, is water.

== Demographics ==
Historical population
| Census | Pop. | Note | %± |
|---|---|---|---|
| 1910 | 9,525 | | — |
| 1920 | 13,396 | | 40.6% |
| 1930 | 17,211 | | 28.5% |
| 1940 | 15,275 | | −11.2% |
| 1950 | 13,621 | | −10.8% |
| 1960 | 9,962 | | −26.9% |
| 1970 | 8,010 | | −19.6% |
| 1980 | 7,681 | | −4.1% |
| 1990 | 6,459 | | −15.9% |
| 2000 | 6,397 | | −1.0% |
| 2010 | 5,566 | | −13.0% |
| 2020 | 5,077 | | −8.8% |
| 2022 (est.) | 4,969 | | −2.1% |
U.S. Decennial Census

As of the 2000 census, there were 6,397 people, 2,651 households, and 1,757 families residing in the township. The population density was 283.1 inhabitants per square mile (109.3/km^{2}). There were 2,943 housing units at an average density of 130.2 per square mile (50.3/km^{2}) The racial makeup of the township was 90.21% White, 8.05% African American, 0.11% Native American, 0.11% Asian, 0.05% Pacific Islander, 0.30% from other races, and 1.17% from two or more races. Hispanic or Latino of any race were 0.30% of the population.

There were 2,651 households, out of which 27.1% had children under the age of 18 living with them, 47.0% were married couples living together, 14.7% had a female householder with no husband present, and 33.7% were non-families. 30.4% of all households were made up of individuals, and 16.7% had someone living alone who was 65 years of age or older. The average household size was 2.40 and the average family size was 2.99.

In the township the population was spread out, with 22.4% under the age of 18, 7.9% from 18 to 24, 26.5% from 25 to 44, 23.5% from 45 to 64, and 19.7% who were 65 years of age or older. The median age was 41 years. For every 100 females there were 89.8 males. For every 100 females age 18 and over, there were 87.1 males.

The median income for a household in the township was $23,916, and the median income for a family was $31,713. Males had a median income of $26,270 versus $19,938 for females. The per capita income for the township was $13,945. About 16.1% of families and 19.9% of the population were below the poverty line, including 29.1% of those under age 18 and 12.9% of those age 65 or over.

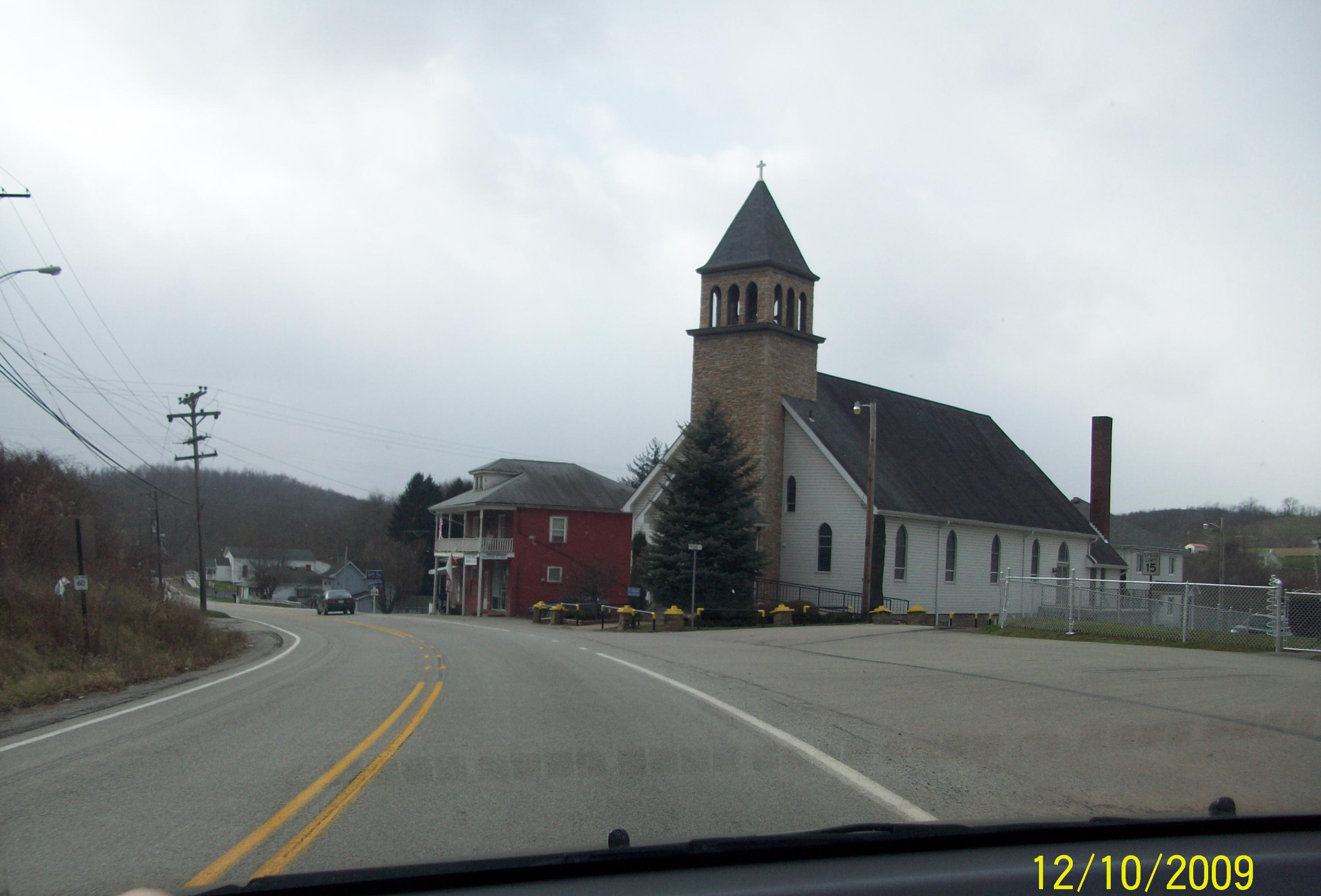
Catholic church and Grindstone Post Office on rural Tippecanoe Road
