= List of rail trails in West Virginia =

This list of rail trails in West Virginia includes former railroad right-of-ways in West Virginia that have been converted to trails for public use and proposed rail trails.

== Established rail trails ==
- Allegheny Highland Trail: built as part of the Corridor H project
- Beckley Rail Trail: located in the city of Beckley; also known as the Lewis McManus Trail
- Blackwater Canyon, over 12 miles
- Brooke Pioneer Rail-Trail: 3.5-mile (5.6 km) asphalt trail in Brooke County
- Brooklyn-Southside Junction Trail: an old railroad in the New River Gorge that extends from the old mining towns of Brooklyn to a now-active rail junction just west of Thurmond
- Caperton Trail: follows the Monongahela River from the Mon River Rail Trail South to Mon River Rail Trail North through Morgantown
- Cheat Lake Trail: follows part of the eastern shore of Cheat Lake north of Interstate 68; an extension north into Pennsylvania would connect it to the Mon River Rail Trail North
- Cranberry / Tri-Rivers Trail: a depot was renovated in the city of Richwood for use as a trailhead for the trail. This 14.5 former rail bed extends from the city along the Cherry River to the Gauley River. The trail then turns upstream and follows alongside the Gauley to a high trestle and enters a tunnel, dead-ending at Allingdale. An extension is planned or underway from Cowen to Bolair.
- Cunard - Kaymoor Trail: follows an old railroad from the old mining towns of Cunard to Kaymoor in the New River Gorge
- Deckers Creek Rail Trail: follows an abandoned rail corridor along Deckers Creek that extends from the Caperton Trail in Morgantown to Reedsville; 19 miles (31 km) in length
- East Wetzel Rail-Trail: a 1.5-mile (2.4 km) rail trail located in Hundred (Wetzel County)
- Elk River Rail Trail: a 1-mile (1.6 km) rail trail that currently extends in Coonskin Park in Kanawha County just north of Charleston; the remainder of the disused line towards Morgantown may be converted into a rail trail; the extension of the runways at Yeager Airport has damaged the trail to make it nearly impassable at several places
- Glade Creek Trail: located in the New River Gorge along Glade Creek, this 5.6-mile-long (9.0 km) trail follows an old rail bed
- Glen Dale to Moundsville Rail Trail: a 3.1-mile (5.0 km) rail trail
- Greenbrier River Trail: a 77-mile (124 km) rail trail that goes through pristine eastern West Virginia
- Harrison County Bike and Hike Rail-Trail: a 7-mile (11 km) rail trail that goes through Clarksburg and Harrison County
- Hawks Nest Rail-Trail
- Lime Rock Rail-Trail: a 4-mile (6.4 km) rail trail through Blackwater Canyon in Tucker County
- Lost Creek Rail-Trail: near Clarksburg; also known as South Harrison County Bike-Hike Trail;runs eight miles from Lost Creek to Mount Clare
- MCTrail: a small rail trail from Morgantown Avenue and Winfield Street intersection at East Fairmont to Pricketts Fort State Park, where it connects to the Mon River Rail Trail South
- Mill Creek Rail-Trail: in Anstead; follows Mill Creek to where it flows into the New River
- Mon River Rail Trail North: follows the Monongahela River from the Caperton Trail at Morgantown to Van Voorhis Road; it is being planned for an extension into Pennsylvania, which would ultimately connect to the Cheat Lake Trail; currently 2 miles (3.2 km) in length; planned extension to 6 miles (9.7 km)
- Mon River Rail Trail South: follows the Monongahela River from Pricketts Fort State Park and MCTrail to Morgantown where it becomes the Caperton Trail; 18 miles (29 km) in length
- Narrow Gauge Rail Trail: a 3.5-mile (5.6 km) trail in Babcock State Park in Fayette County
- North Bend Rail Trail: 72 miles, covering most of the distance between Clarksburg and Parkersburg.
- North Marion Rail-Trail
- Panhandle Trail: a 29-mile (47 km) rail trail with some parts complete while others are under construction; spans from the northern sector of Washington County, Pennsylvania to Weirton
- Railroad Grade Rail-Trail: a 4-mile (6.4 km) rail trail through Canaan Valley State Park in Tucker County
- Thurmond-Minden Trail: follows an old rail line from a now-active rail line just west of Thurmond to Minden in the New River Gorge
- West Fork Rail-Trail: this 22-mile (35 km) trail extends through the Monongahela National Forest (Randolph and Pocahontas counties) with a trailhead in Glady; this is near the Allegheny Trail
- Wheeling Heritage Rail-Trail: a 12-mile (19 km) trail in three segments in the Wheeling region
- White Oak Rail Trail: an asphalt trail along a 7.5-mile-long (12.1 km) abandoned Norfolk Southern Railway corridor that travels through Oak Hill, West Virginia, beginning near a church along West Virginia Route 612 on the south and ending at Summerlee Road on the north end, with a spur beginning near the existing Norfolk Southern Railway along West Virginia Route 61 and meeting the mainline trail near the former Collins Middle School building..

== Proposed rail trails ==
- The Mon River Rail Trail North is slated for an extension north from Van Voorhis Road to Pennsylvania, where a trail would loop back to the Cheat Lake Trail. The Mon River Rail Trail North is currently 2 miles (3.2 km) long with an extension to 6 miles (9.7 km) slated for construction.

== See also ==
- List of rail trails
