= Treasure trove (disambiguation) =

A treasure trove is a hidden store of valuables.

It may also refer to:

- Treasure Trove, a solitare card game
- A Treasure's Trove, a children's book
- Shovel Knight, a collection of video games entitled Shovel Knight: Treasure Trove

== See also ==
- Treasure Trove Reviewing Committee
- Trove (disambiguation)
