= Tioga, West Virginia =

Tioga
- Census-designated place (CDP)
- Location within the state of West Virginia
- Coordinates: 38°25′13″N 80°39′21″W
- Country: United States
- State: West Virginia
- County: Nicholas

Area
  - Total: 0.621 sq mi (1.61 km^{2})
  - Land: 0.621 sq mi (1.61 km^{2})
  - Water: 0 sq mi (0 km^{2})

Population (2020)
  - Total: 79
  - Density: 130/sq mi (49/km^{2})
- Time zone: UTC-5 (Eastern (EST))
  - Summer (DST): UTC-4 (EDT)

Tioga is a census-designated place (CDP) in northeastern Nicholas County, West Virginia, United States. As of the 2020 census, its population was 79 (down from 98 at the 2010 census). The town is located along a road alternatively called Tioga Road (County Route 3) in Nicholas County and Strouds Creek Road (County Route 11) in Webster County. The road can be accessed from West Virginia Route 20 in Allingdale and West Virginia Route 55 near Craigsville.

The community was named after Tioga County, Pennsylvania, the native home of several local lumbermen.
