= Michael Stadther =

American writer

Michael Stadther (February 17, 1952 - January 30, 2018) was an author best known for his book A Treasure's Trove: A Fairy Tale about Real Treasure for Parents and Children of All Ages. Treasure Trove, Inc. was incorporated to distribute the book. A sequel to A Treasure's Trove, called Secrets of the Alchemist Dar was released in September, 2006. After the success of A Treasure's Trove, other ventures including robotic editing were started to help self-published authors. Treasure Trove, Inc. was put into bankruptcy in 2007 in a dispute with its distributor, Simon and Schuster. Stadther lived in Pound Ridge, New York with his wife of 25 years, Helen Demetrios at the time the two books were published. He died in Coronado, California on January 30th, 2018, at the age of 65.
