= Point Marion, Pennsylvania =

Borough in Pennsylvania, United States

- Borough
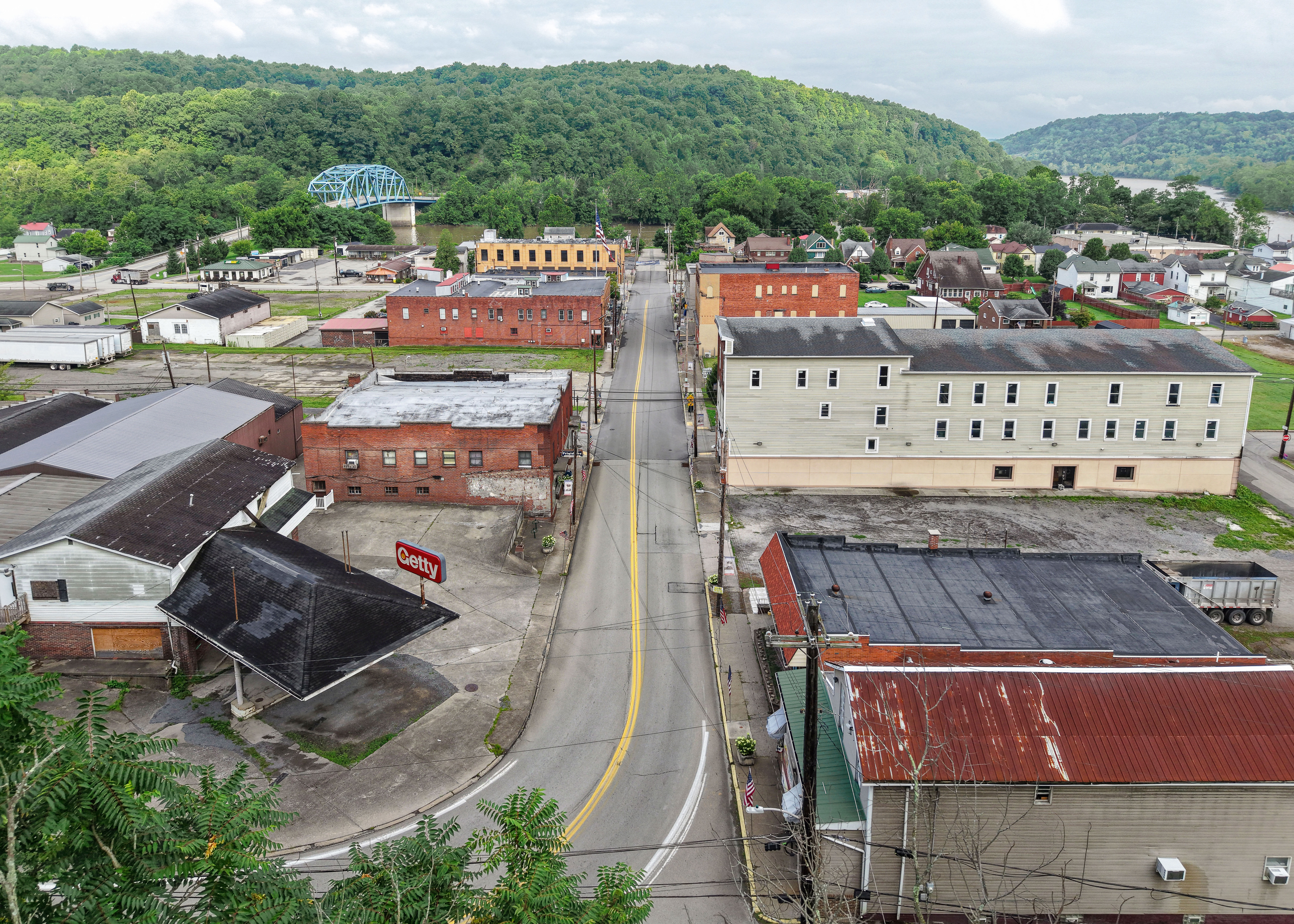
- Downtown (2026)

- Location of Point Marion in Fayette County, Pennsylvania.

- Location in Pennsylvania Point; Marion (the United States)
- Coordinates: 39°44′9″N 79°53′59″W
- Country: United States
- State: Pennsylvania
- County: Fayette
- Established: 1842

Government
  - Mayor: Collin Smith

Area
  - Total: 0.49 sq mi (1.27 km^{2})
  - Land: 0.41 sq mi (1.05 km^{2})
  - Water: 0.085 sq mi (0.22 km^{2})
- Elevation: 810 ft (250 m)

Population (2020)
  - Total: 1,156
  - Density: 2,854.0/sq mi (1,101.94/km^{2})
- Time zone: UTC-4 (EST)
  - Summer (DST): UTC-5 (EDT)
- ZIP code: 15474
- Area code: 724
- FIPS code: 42-61864
- Website: https://pmboro.com/

Point Marion is a borough in Fayette County, Pennsylvania, United States, and is located less than one mile north of West Virginia at the confluence of the Monongahela and Cheat rivers. Approximately three miles north of Point Marion is Friendship Hill National Historic Site, home of early American politician Albert Gallatin. Point Marion was settled in the mid-18th century and named in 1842 for its geographic location and Revolutionary War hero Francis Marion, the "Swamp Fox". The population was 1,152 at the 2020 census, a decline from the figure of 1,159 tabulated in 2010. It is served by the Albert Gallatin Area School District.

== History ==
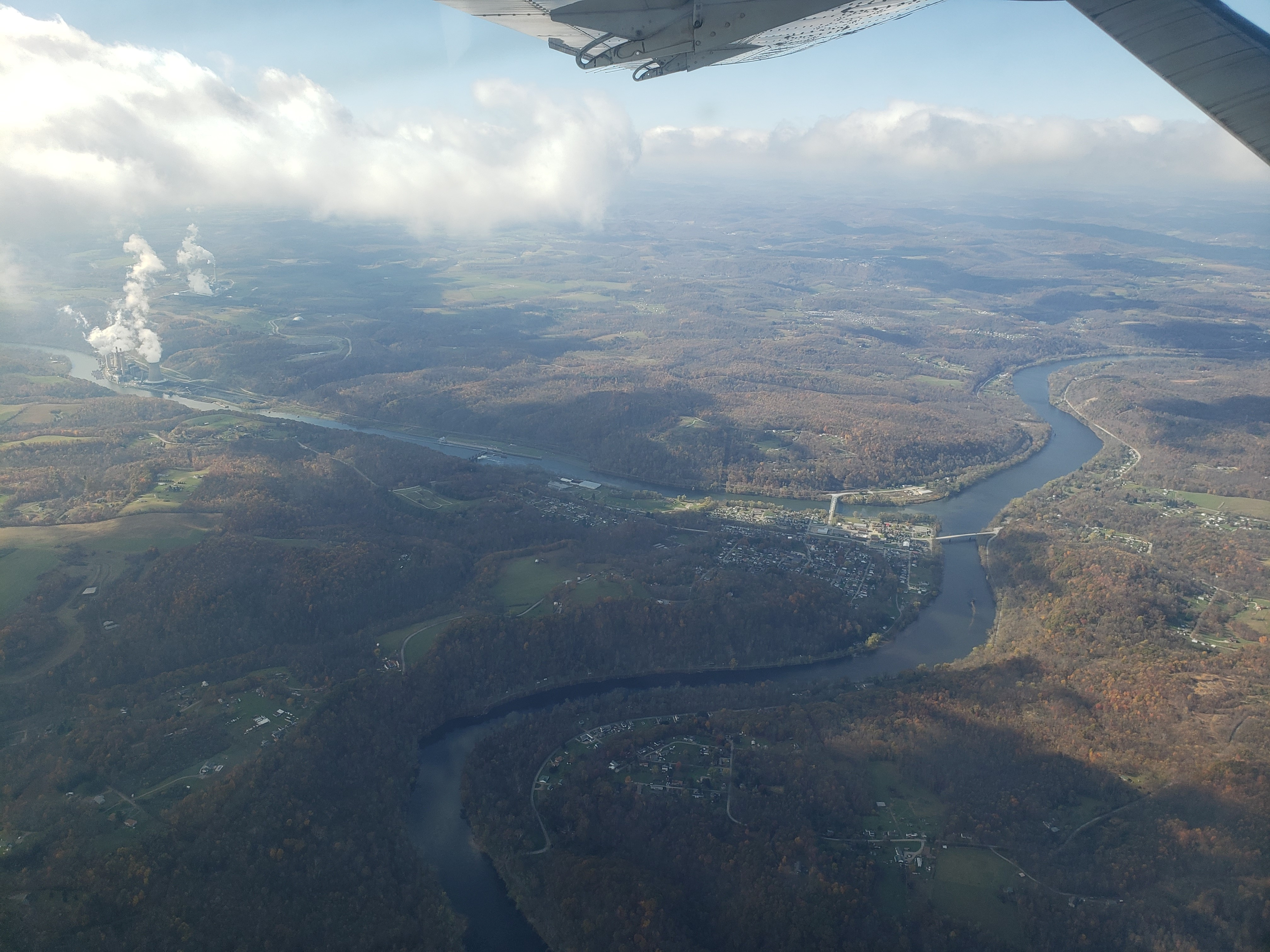
Aerial view of Point Marion Pennsylvania

=== Early history ===
The region's original inhabitants from AD 1050 to 1635 were the Iroquoian related Monongahela Culture tribes. Two archeological sites from these tribes exist locally today: 1) several miles to the south of Point Marion in Morgantown, WV, and 2) two miles to the north at Dunkard Creek. This Aboriginal culture, which peaked about AD 1300 and dominated all of southwestern Pennsylvania, disappeared by the 1630s.

But a short time later, by the mid-1600s, the Iroquois related Shawnee tribe from what would later become upstate New York began expanding westward and southward into western Pennsylvania and the Ohio River valley regions. This included what would later be Point Marion and Fayette County, but which would be known at that time as the "Hunting Grounds" of the Iroquois Confederation.

=== 1700s ===
==== European settlement ====
The first Europeans arrived at what would become Point Marion in 1723 when Jacques Cheathe, a Quebec native of French Huguenot origin, reached an agreement with the local Natives to trap, fish, and hunt there. In 1724 he established a trading post near the point and became the first settler to live there.

In 1751 a mix of English and German settlers started moving in, and after the French and Indian War, France relinquished its claim of the region to Great Britain in 1763. As more American colonial settlers then began to move into this frontier area, a Colonel George Wilson was granted 108 acres where the French trading post once stood.

The English surveyors Mason and Dixon were charged with surveying the southern border of Pennsylvania. Beginning south of Philadelphia, they worked their way westward over mountainous virgin forest, setting engraved limestone markers imported from England along the way. In doing so, they crossed the Cheat River and then the Monongahela River less than one mile south of Point Marion in October 1767 and concluded their survey soon afterwards about twelve miles west of the Monongahela River.

Once the British pushed out the French in 1763, the future Point Marion region became part of Monongalia County, Virginia. But after the American Revolutionary War, Pennsylvania and Virginia agreed in 1773 to abide by the recent Mason-Dixon line survey, and it became part of Westmoreland County, Pennsylvania. Finally, in 1783, Fayette County was formed from Westmoreland County, where Point Marion remains today.

An example of the future Point Marion region's early frontier settlement is the Forks of Cheat Baptist Church, founded two miles south of the point with twelve members (reflecting multiple families) by Reverend John Corbly of Ireland on November 7, 1775. The original log-built structure was burned down during a Native American raid in the late 1700s but was rebuilt in 1803. Now sitting on the present-day West Virginia side of the state line, the church's name refers to the fork the Cheat and Monongahela rivers, in other words, the point of modern-day Point Marion. Notably, this is the oldest still active church west of the Allegheny Mountains, and each July members celebrate this fact by flying the British Union Jack flag to celebrate its colonial era founding. As for Reverend Corbly, in 1882 his wife and children were massacred across the river in neighboring Greene County by Indians, a reflection of western Pennsylvania frontier life at that time.

==== George Washington's visit ====
In 1784, General George Washington (who later became U.S. president in 1789) visited the point. Washington passed through the area while going to inspect land in Washington County PA he had been granted many years earlier by the British as reward for his efforts in helping to expel the French in the 1750s. On September 24th, 1784, Washington recorded in his journal: "Crossed in Cheat at the mouth as it was too much swelled up to attempt to ford a little higher up. This Cheat, at the mouth, is about 125 yards wide. The Monongahela is nearly double that. The color of the Cheat is dark, the other is clear." Those who know Point Marion today can attest to the distinct separation of the river waters where they meet at the point and that the Cheat is still dark, which would seem to confirm that George Washington himself indeed walked the ground of the future Point Marion. Of course, at that time the town did not yet exist, but Pennsylvania had officially designated the Monongahela River as a public highway, and boats and ferries moved up and down the river. And at the point during Washington's time, travelers could stop at Morgan's Tavern, established by Morgantown, Virginia (now West Virginia) founder Zackquill Morgan.

In 1788, and only four years after George Washington's visit to the area, Swiss immigrant Albert Gallatin (future United States Secretary of Treasury under Thomas Jefferson and James Madison) purchased land only four miles downstream and built a country estate that would become known as Friendship Hill. One of his friends who later visited him there was General Lafayette, for whom Fayette County is named. The property is now maintained as a national historic site by the National Park Service, while Gallatin's name lives on in the area through the Albert Gallatin Area School District.

=== 1800s ===
In 1801, the family of the aforementioned Colonel George Wilson sold the land at the point to a Jacob Sadler. Eventually, the land was subdivided into lots, and on March 15, 1842, it was auctioned to the public. As part of this sale, the first lot purchaser was permitted to choose the future town's name, and thus for $100, a Seth Stafford chose to name it after the Revolutionary War hero General Francis Marion, whose biography was popular at that time. Finally in 1844, the town of Point Marion was officially founded as a "Borough".

In 1847, ferry service between Greene County and Fayette County and adjacent to Point Marion was started by Ambrose Dillinger, which his family continued to operate it until 1931 (due to bridges it only then became obsolete).

Since Point Marion's founding, the state of Virginia lay just one mile to the south, but as a result of the Civil War, it became West Virginia in 1863. By 1867, Point Marion was growing, and had eleven dwellings and one store. During this period, the chief industry was lumber. Logging was conducted upstream along the Cheat River, and the logs were floated down to Point Marion, where they were milled and processed into various products, before being sent downstream for sale. The Monongahela River was still the most important method to transport goods, and locks were gradually built along the river.

In 1879, the Point Marion lock was built, which was a major event, as it made the town accessible by river year-round. As a result of improved river travel as well as railroad access not long afterward, between the 1890s and the start of the Great Depression, Point Marion became a summer destination for some of Pittsburgh's well-off residents, and in response, several hotels, and restaurants as well as a park were constructed. Paddlewheel steamboats and showboats with entertainment from Pittsburgh became a regular event.

In 1890, the McClain brothers founded a sand and gravel business, initially to supply needed materials for the Baltimore and Ohio Railroad. The business expanded from there and operated for many decades, with barges, dredges, and a company steamboat plying the two rivers around the point.

=== 1900s ===
In 1900, a commercial building boom began, which created a town core. And in 1907, Penn Street was laid with bricks, making it the first paved street. Newly arrived Italian immigrants dominated this construction. However, a massive fire in 1922 destroyed half of the town buildings, and they had to be rebuilt. The glass industry also commenced in Point Marion in 1900, and soon six different companies operated small plants. Many of their workers were Belgian trained hand-blown glass artisans, and these French speaking immigrants from Belgium's Walloon Region founded Saint Hubert’s Catholic Church in 1909 (rebuilt in 2005), honoring the popular seventh century Saint Hubert, who is buried back in their local region of Belgium. These two new ethnic groups, (French speaking) Belgians and (South) Italians, brought Catholicism to Point Marion for the first time, and added to the diversity of the town's long-time ethnic British (English, Scots-Irish, Welsh) and German descended Protestant inhabitants.

Then, in 1923, Leon Houze, who had arrived from Belgium, consolidated three of the companies into the Houze Convex Glass Company. This became Point Marion's largest employer for over one hundred years, until closing in 2004. But during its heyday, it was an important specialty glass manufacturer in the United States, and in the 1950s their hand-blown windows were even installed in the White House. Woolworths sold specialty lamps nationwide which came from Houze Glass. When President Nixon visited China in 1972, he took glass trays made at Houze Glass. President Gerald Ford had ashtrays on Air Force One that were hand crafted at Houze Glass. And when the yet to be future president Donald Trump launched his airline "Trump Shuttle" in 1989, Houze Glass made 3,500 specialty mugs to mark its maiden flight. That the above high-end products could have been made elsewhere says much about Houze Glass's unique capabilities.

In 1909 Cheat River Bridge was inaugurated on July 5. This was the first bridge to be built into Point Marion and was significant to the development of the region. In 1910, planning began for the Lake Lynn Dam and Power Station just upstream on the Cheat River at the state line. WWI caused it to be halted, but it recommenced in 1925, Cheat Lake was created, and the power station began operation in 1926. The dam itself is 1,000 feet long and 125 feet high.

Also in 1926, a new and advanced Point Marion Lock and Dam was opened on the Monongahela River, which operates to this day.

In 1930 Albert Gallatin Memorial Bridge was built. Designed in Kansas City and constructed with Pittsburgh steel, it enabled direct access to Greene County and resulting in development between the two counties and their peoples. Previously, ferries were used.

In 1937 and in what was considered eventful, President Franklin D. Roosevelt's train passed through Point Marion.

In 1967, the Fort Martin Power Plant commenced operation on the Monongahela River just across the state line. While providing jobs, the power plant also altered the landscape. It also increased the number of tugboats with barges of coal seen on the river, headed to the power plant.

=== 21st century ===
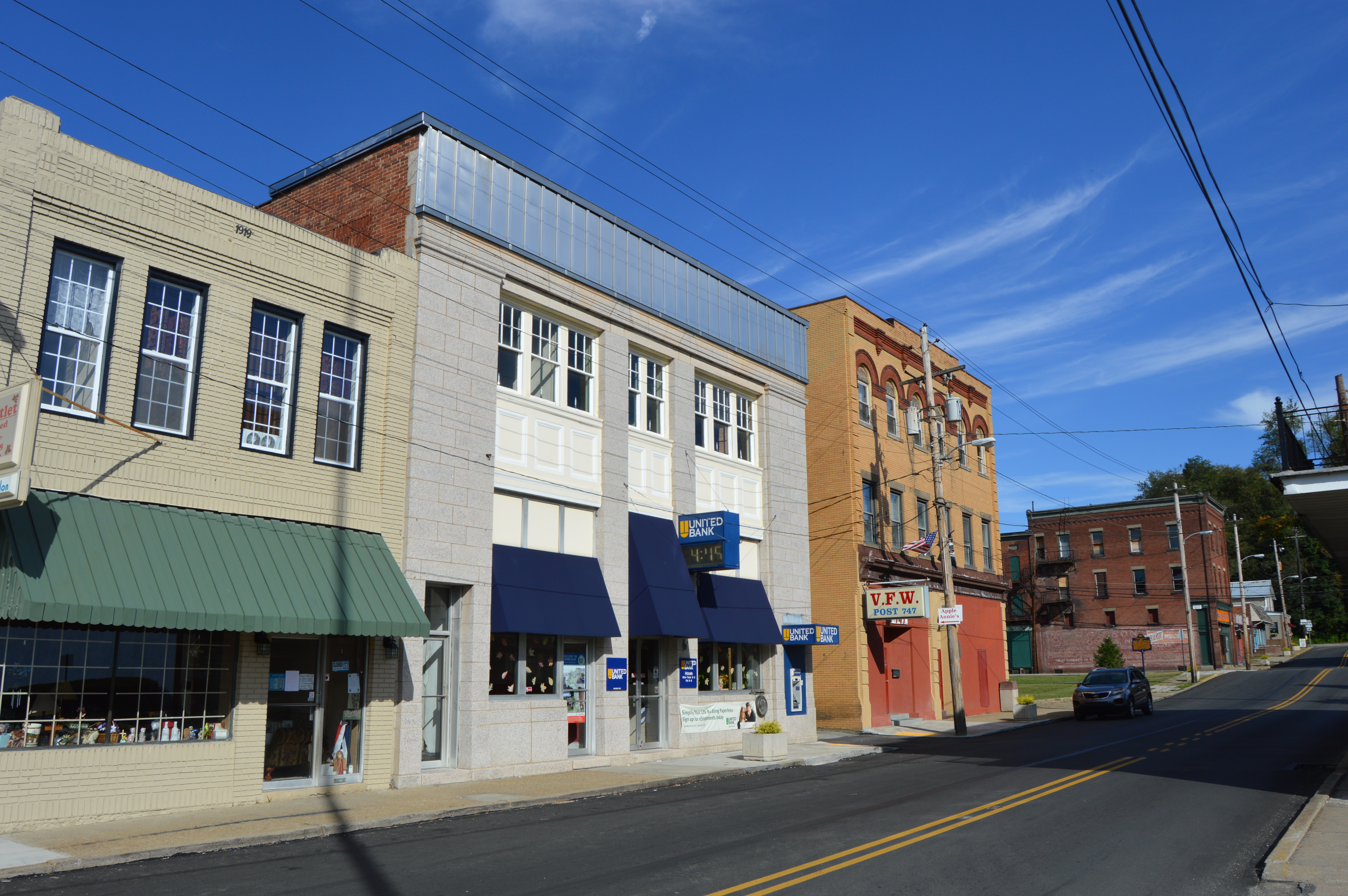
Penn Street in downtown Point Marion

Today, as in the past, Point Marion straddles two states and two regions: Fayette County and Pennsylvania, of which it is a part, and Morgantown, West Virginia, of which it is adjacent to, and to which it remains deeply connected. Indeed, as Morgantown housing has become more expensive, Point Marion has to a small degree become a ‘bedroom community’ for some residents.

Within the early years of this century, both bridges that were built in the early 20th Century were replaced.

The former Baltimore and Ohio Railroad that once ran through Point Marion was repurposed in 2008 by Fayette County via federal funds into what is known as the Sheepskin Trail.

In 2011 the $2.2 billion Longview Power Plant began operation just across the state line, which further changed the local landscape and skyline.

Like many small towns in the region, Point Marion is quieter than in past decades, with fewer local businesses. However, the Boat Launch at the town park continues to draw recreational boaters and fishermen from both Pennsylvania and West Virginia. Also, town church events, events such as the annual car show, and the especially the annual ‘Albert Gallatin Regatta’ held on the river, along with a parade and fireworks, help keep the community connected.

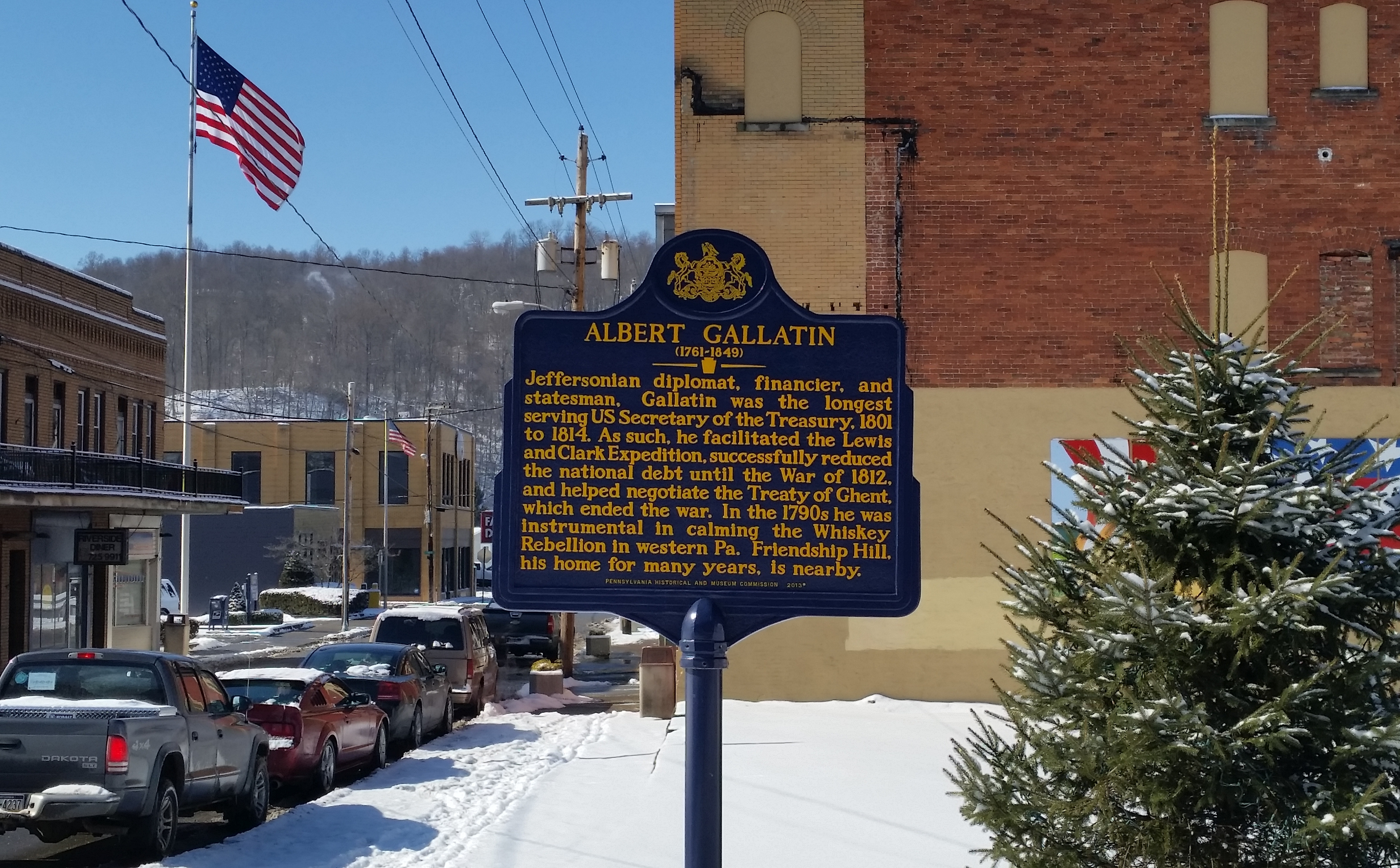
Sign honoring local historical figure Albert Gallatin

== Geography ==
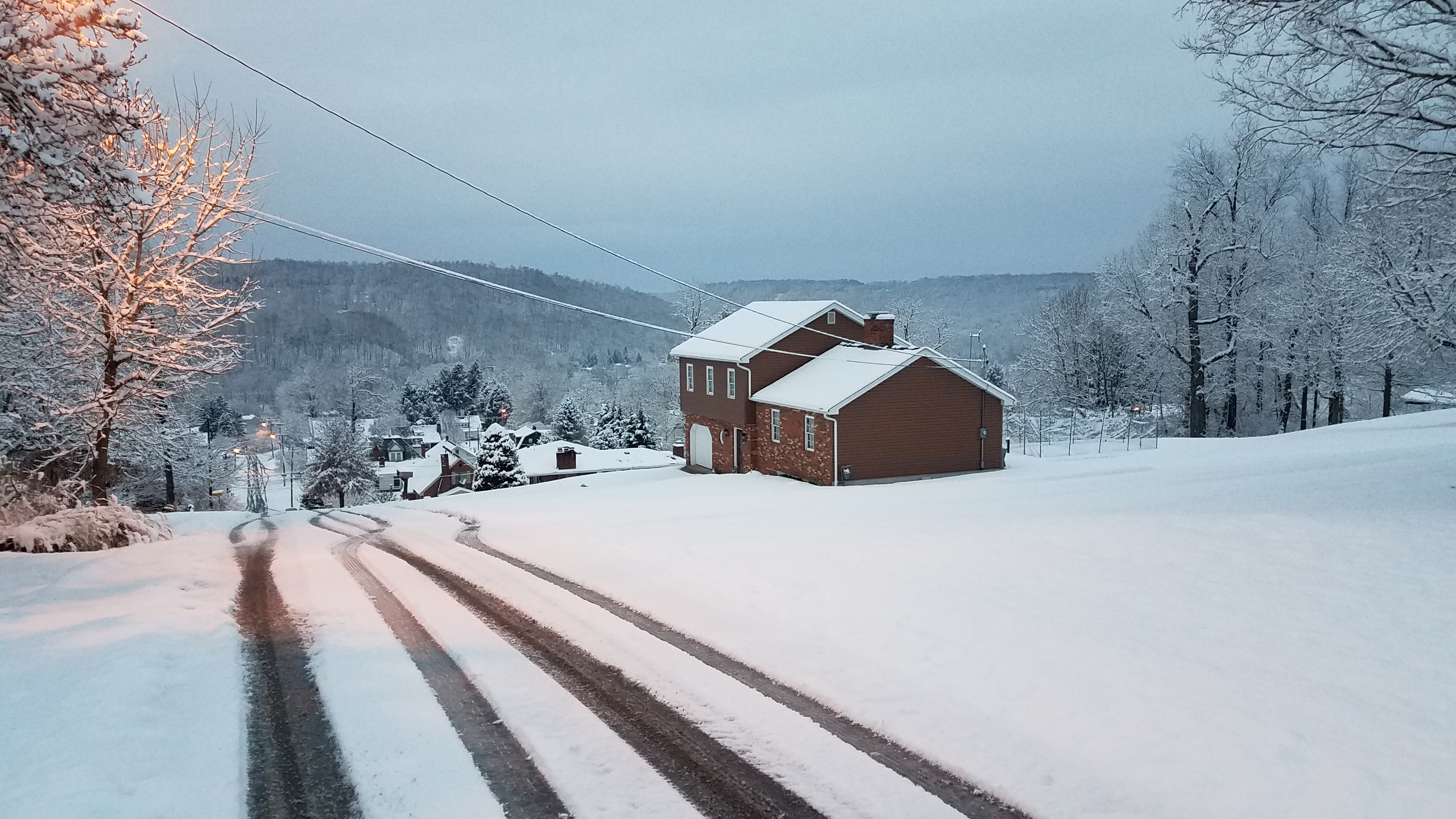
Early morning winter view of the Point Marion valley

Point Marion is located near the southwestern corner of Fayette County at 39°44′9″N 79°53′59″W (39.735711, −79.899698). It lies within the angle formed by the confluence of the Cheat and Monongahela rivers; the Cheat forms the northeastern boundary of the borough, and the Monongahela forms the western boundary as well as the border with Greene County.

U.S. Route 119 passes through the borough, crossing the Cheat River and leading northeast 17 miles (27 km) to Uniontown, the Fayette County seat, and leading south 10 miles (16 km) to Morgantown, West Virginia. The West Virginia border is 1.5 miles (2.4 km) south of the center of town. Pennsylvania Route 88 crosses the Monongahela River leaving town and leads north 14 miles (23 km) to Carmichaels.

According to the United States Census Bureau, the borough of Point Marion has a total area of 0.47 square miles (1.21 km^{2}), of which 0.39 square miles (1.02 km^{2}) is land and 0.07 square miles (0.19 km^{2}), or 15.77%, is water.

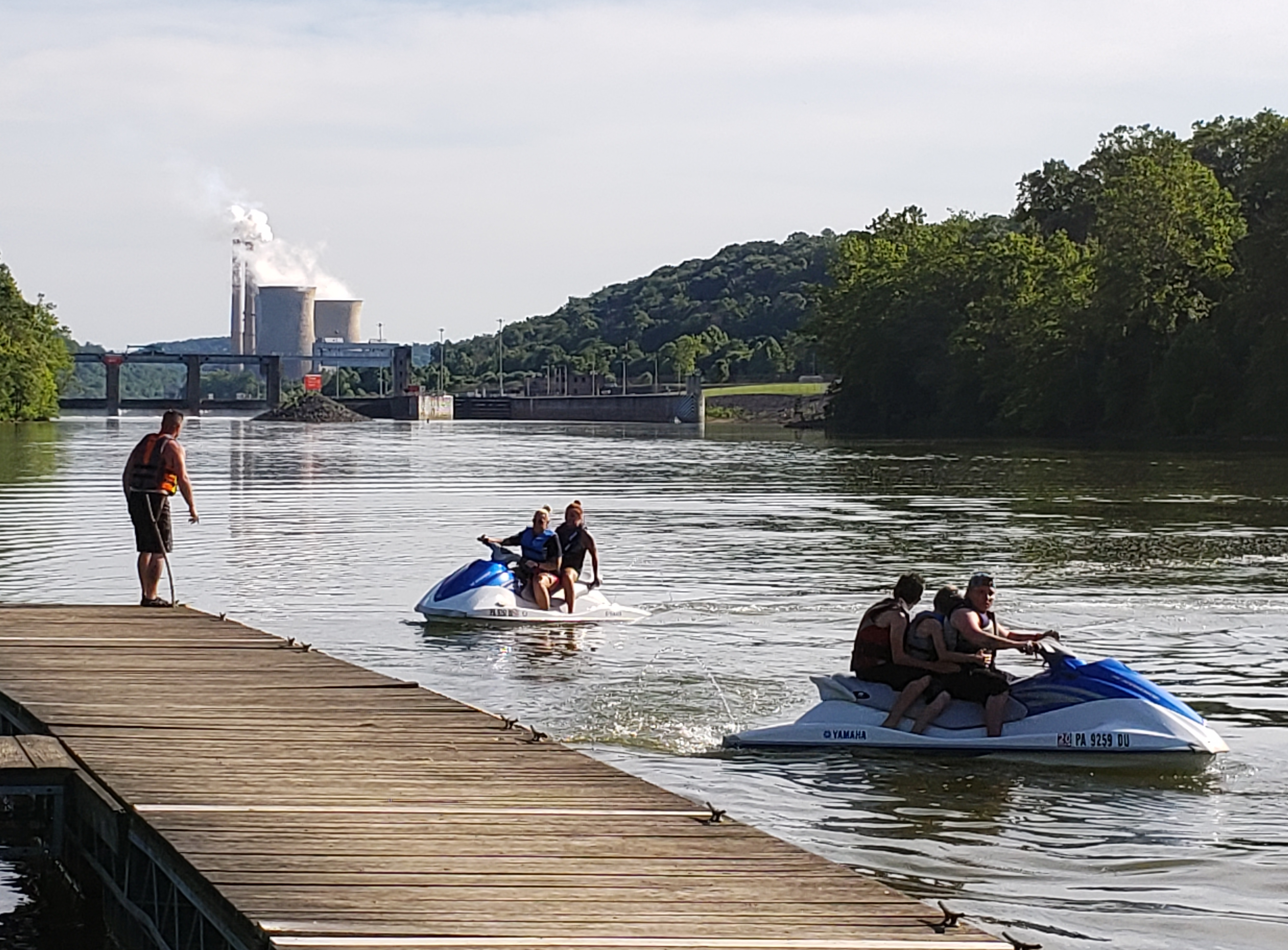
Water sports at Point Marion Community Park's dock, with Fort Martin Power Plant in the background

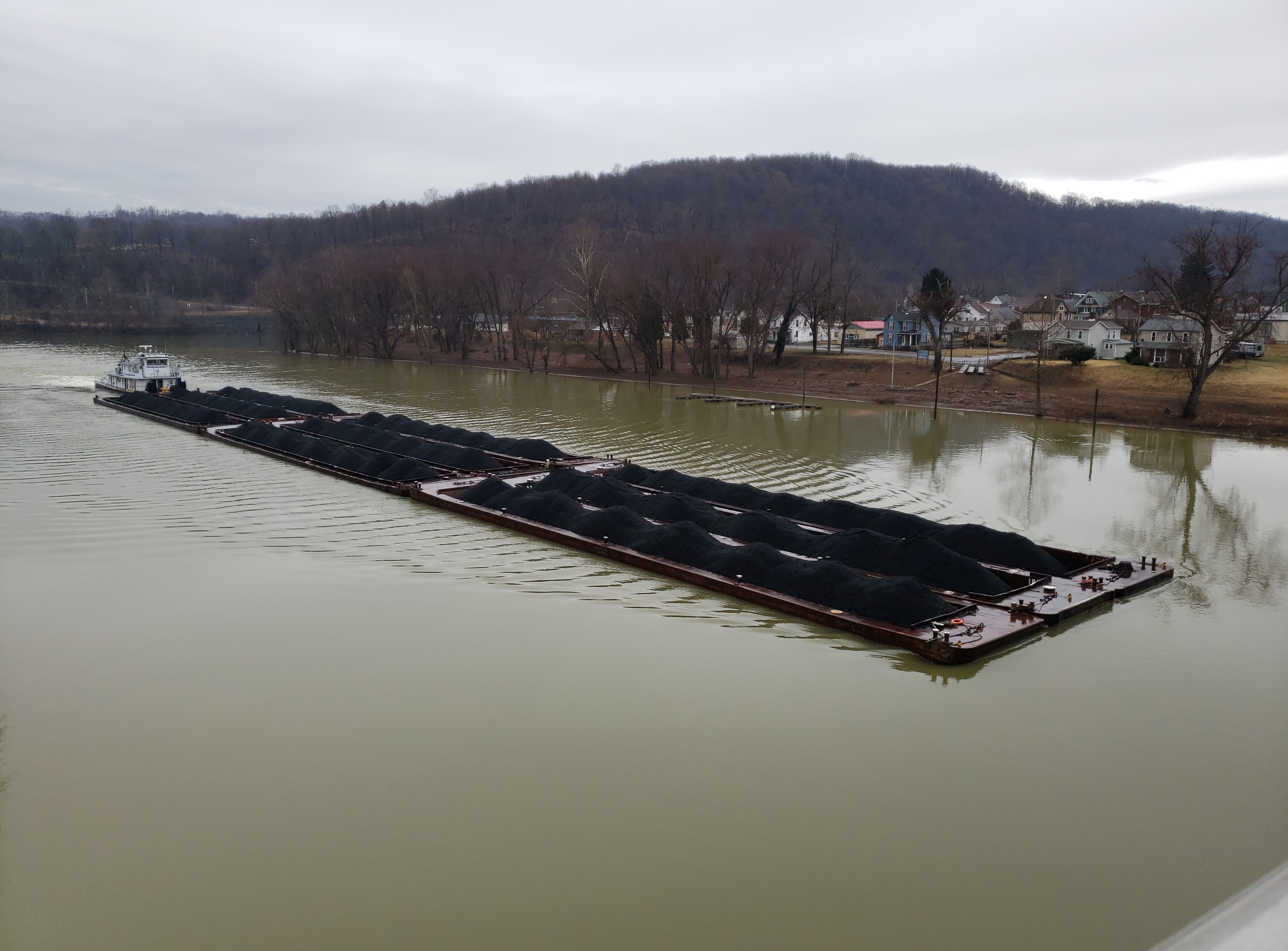
Tugboat transporting barges of coal upriver past Point Marion to the Fort Martin Power Plant

== Demographics ==
Historical population
Census	Pop.	Note	%±
1880	28		—
1900	575		—
1910	1,389		141.6%
1920	1,607		15.7%
1930	2,039		26.9%
1940	2,068		1.4%
1950	2,197		6.2%
1960	1,853		−15.7%
1970	1,750		−5.6%
1980	1,642		−6.2%
1990	1,344		−18.1%
2000	1,333		−0.8%
2010	1,159		−13.1%
2020	1,156		−0.3%
2021 (est.)	1,135	▼	−1.8%

As of the 2000 census, there were 1,333 people, 572 households, and 374 families residing in the borough. The population density was 3,141.9 inhabitants per square mile (1,213.1/km^{2}). There were 682 housing units at an average density of 1,607.5 per square mile (620.7/km^{2}). The racial makeup of the borough was 99.10% White, 0.08% Native American, 0.08% from other races, and 0.75% from two or more races. Hispanic or Latino of any race were 0.60% of the population.

There were 572 households, out of which 28.1% had children under the age of 18 living with them, 48.1% were married couples living together, 11.7% had a female householder with no husband present, and 34.6% were non-families. 31.6% of all households were made up of individuals, and 15.6% had someone living alone who was 65 years of age or older. The average household size was 2.31 and the average family size was 2.87.

In the borough the population was spread out, with 22.3% under the age of 18, 6.8% from 18 to 24, 28.8% from 25 to 44, 21.8% from 45 to 64, and 20.3% who were 65 years of age or older. The median age was 40 years. For every 100 females, there were 102.0 males. For every 100 females age 18 and over, there were 95.5 males.

The median income for a household in the borough was $26,413, and the median income for a family was $36,989. Males had a median income of $27,439 versus $23,859 for females. The per capita income for the borough was $13,300. About 15.2% of families and 23.5% of the population were below the poverty line, including 34.7% of those under age 18 and 18.1% of those age 65 or over.

== Gallery ==
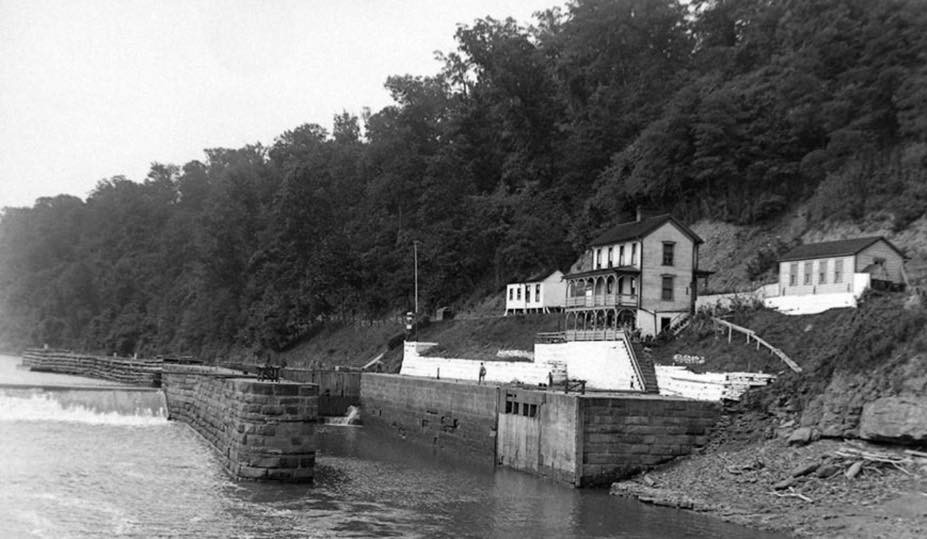
Original lock and dam, circa 1930

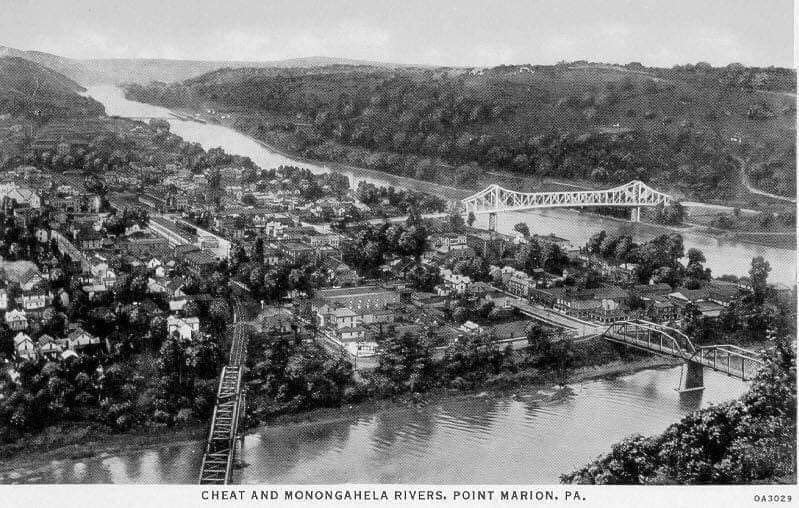
Point Marion, circa early 1930s

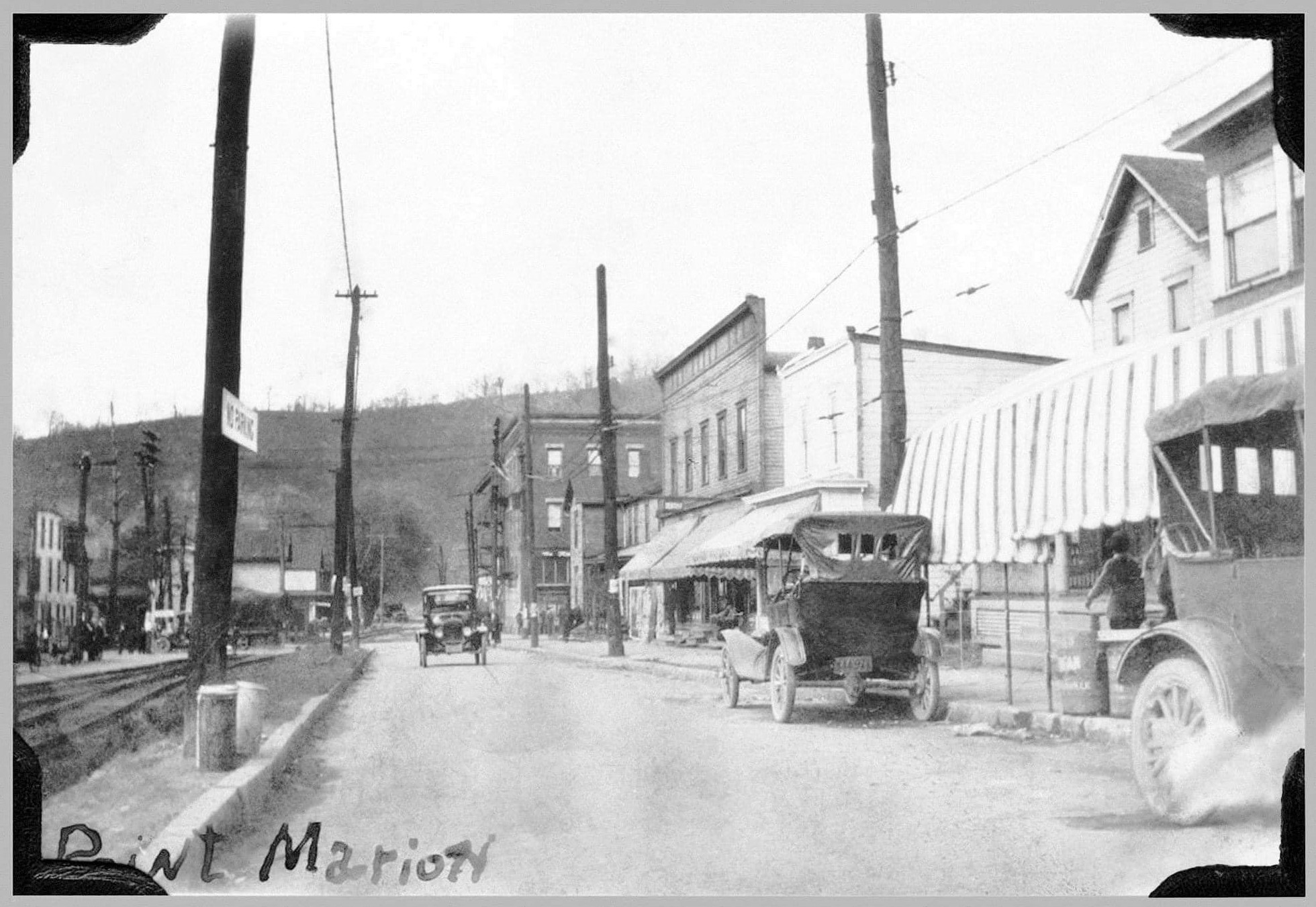
Railroad Street, circa 1920s

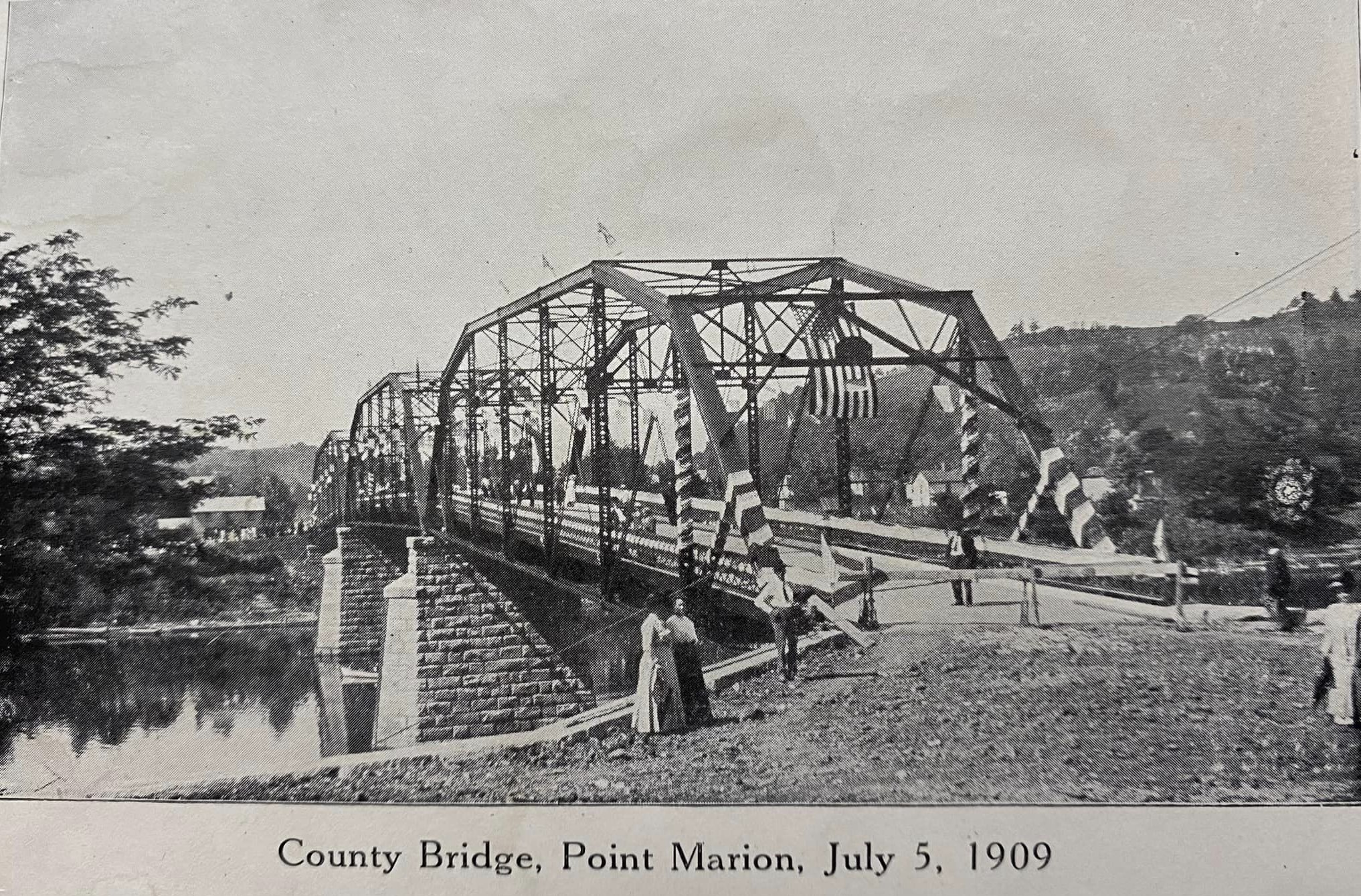
Cheat River Bridge opening celebration, 1909

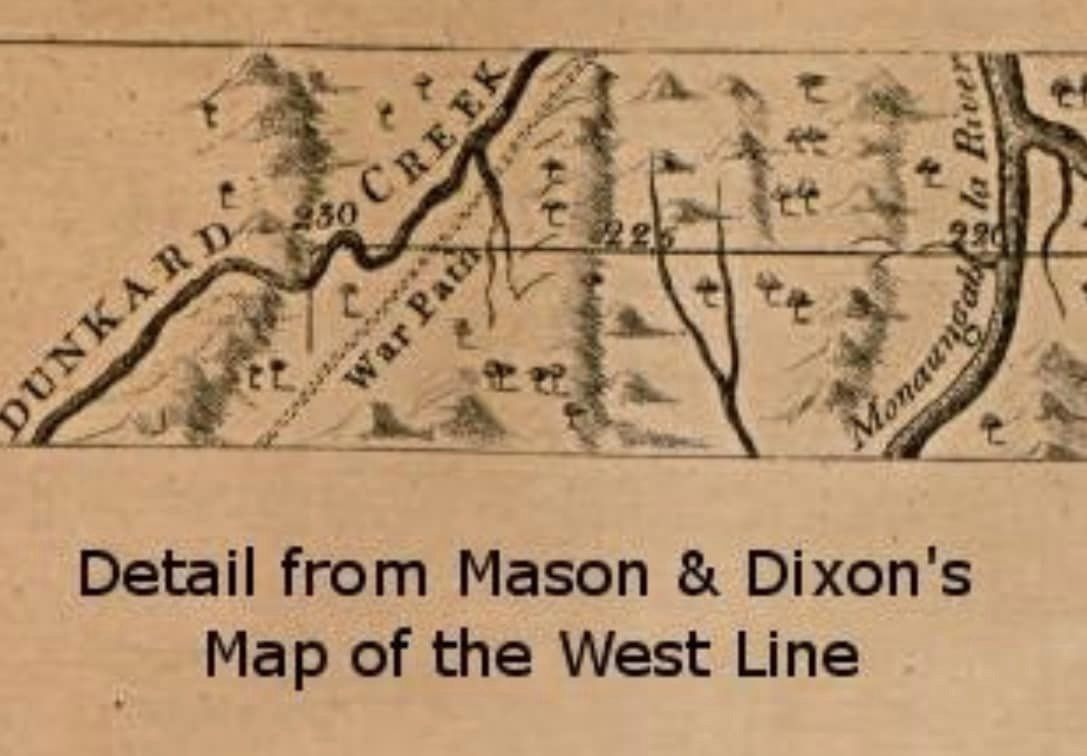
The Point Marion region in the late 1700s

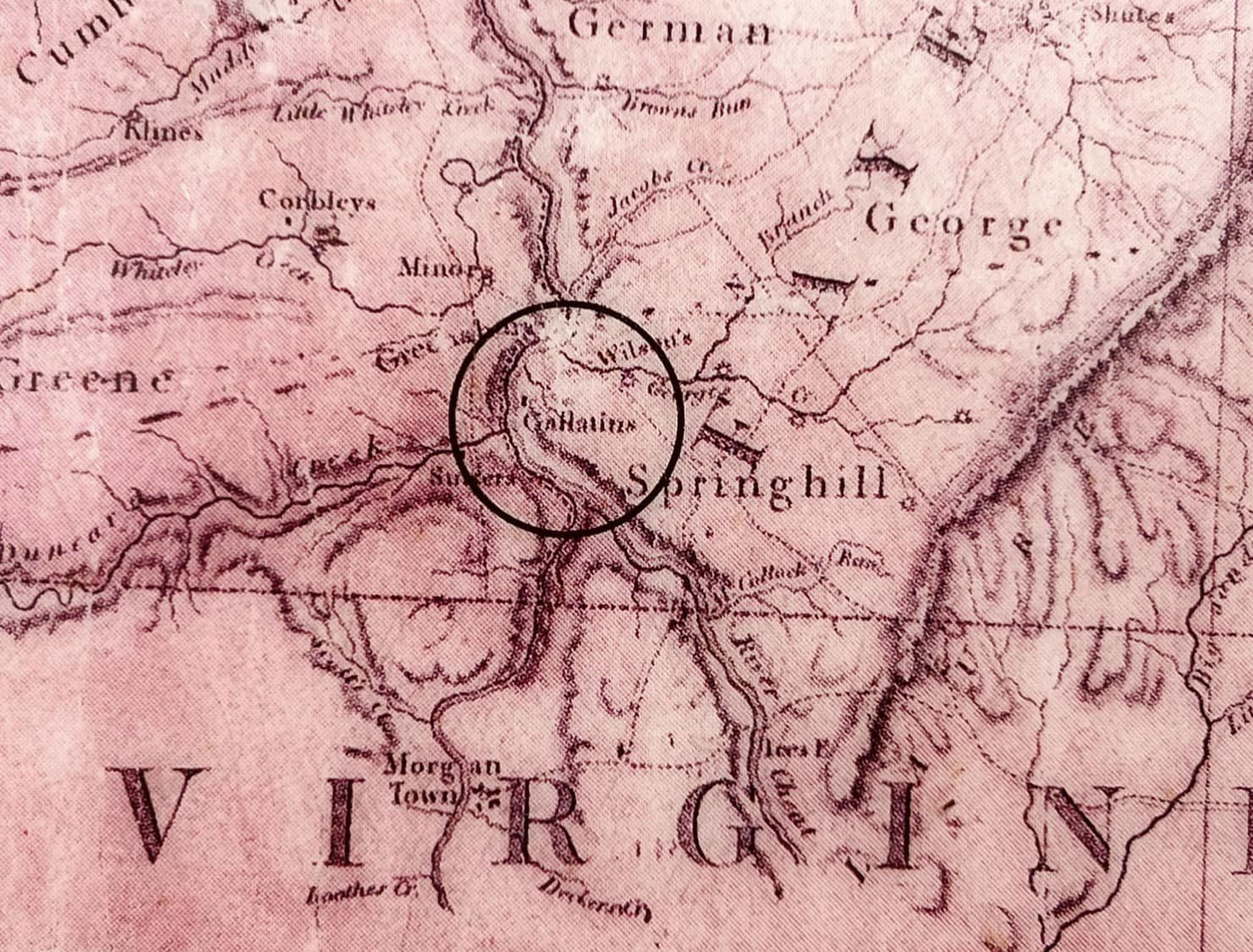
The Point Marion region before the Civil War

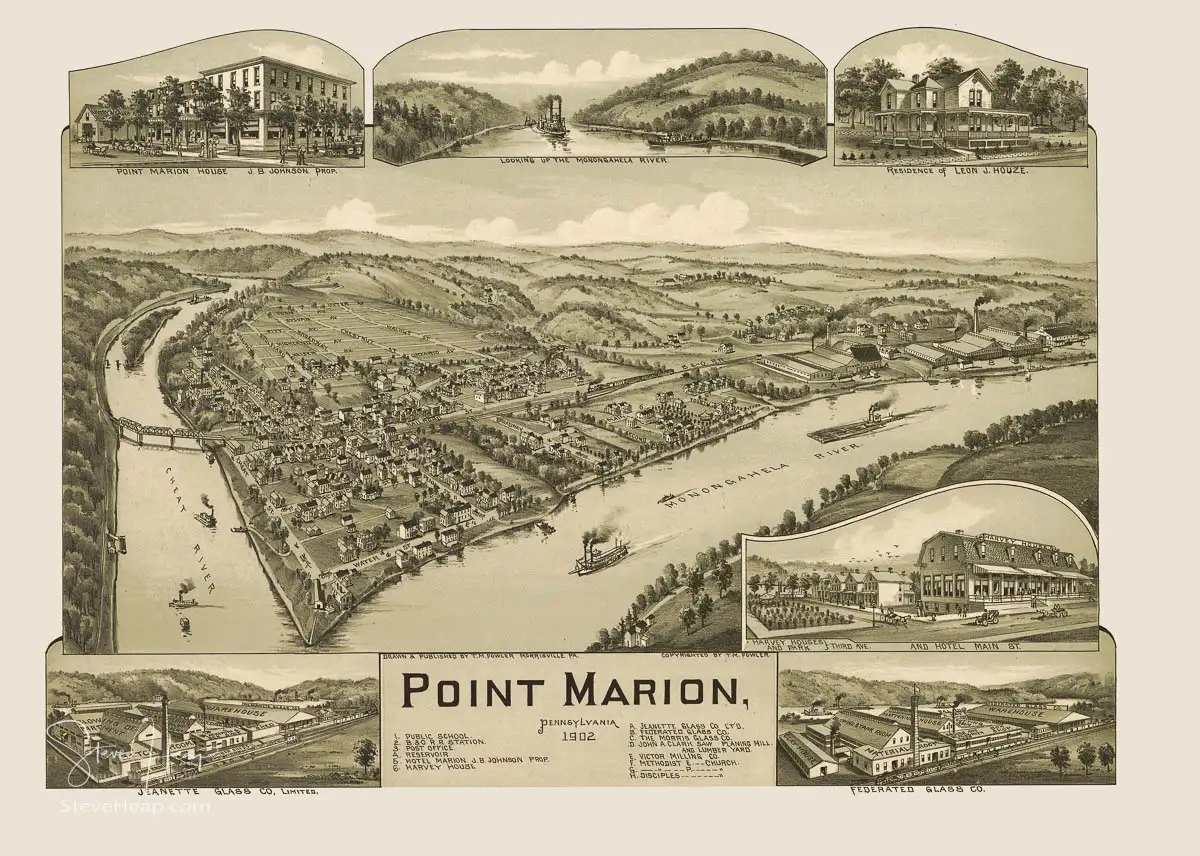
Point Marion in 1902

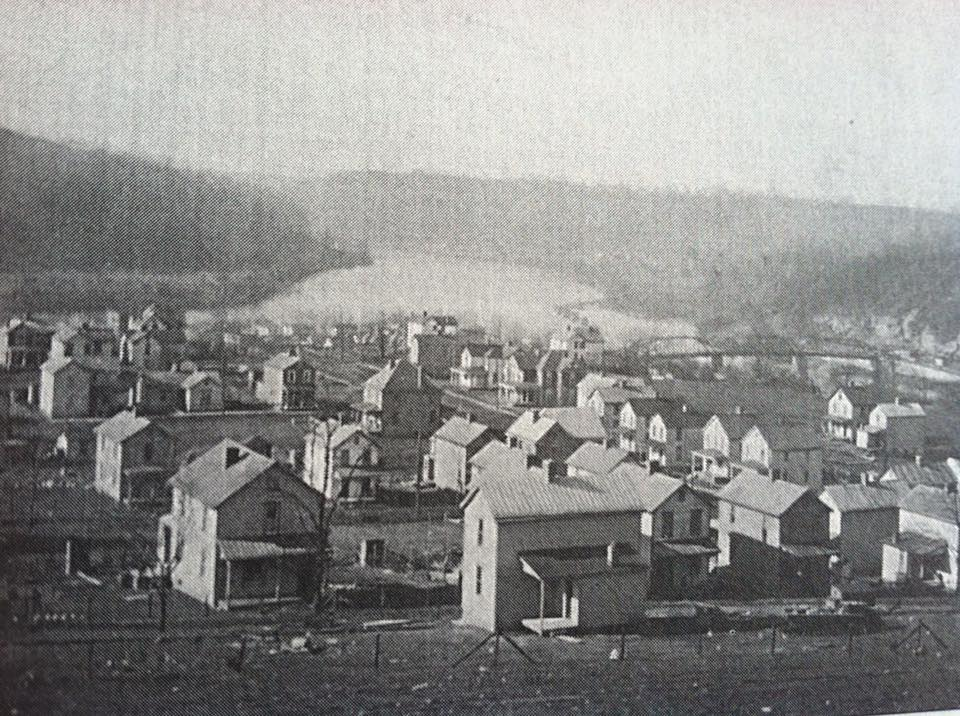
Point Marion from Schoolhouse Hill in the early 1900s

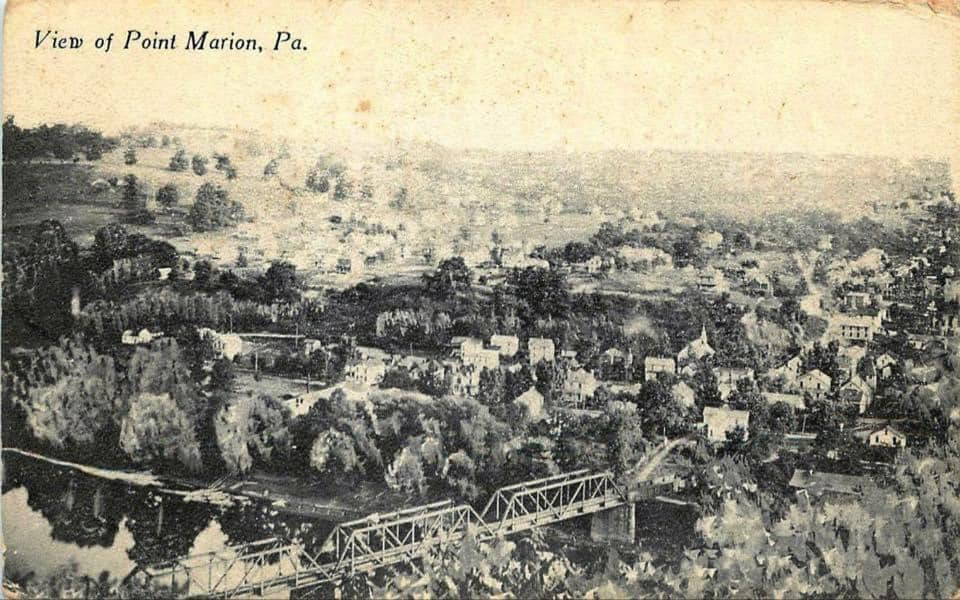
Point Marion from Blosser Hill in the early 1900s

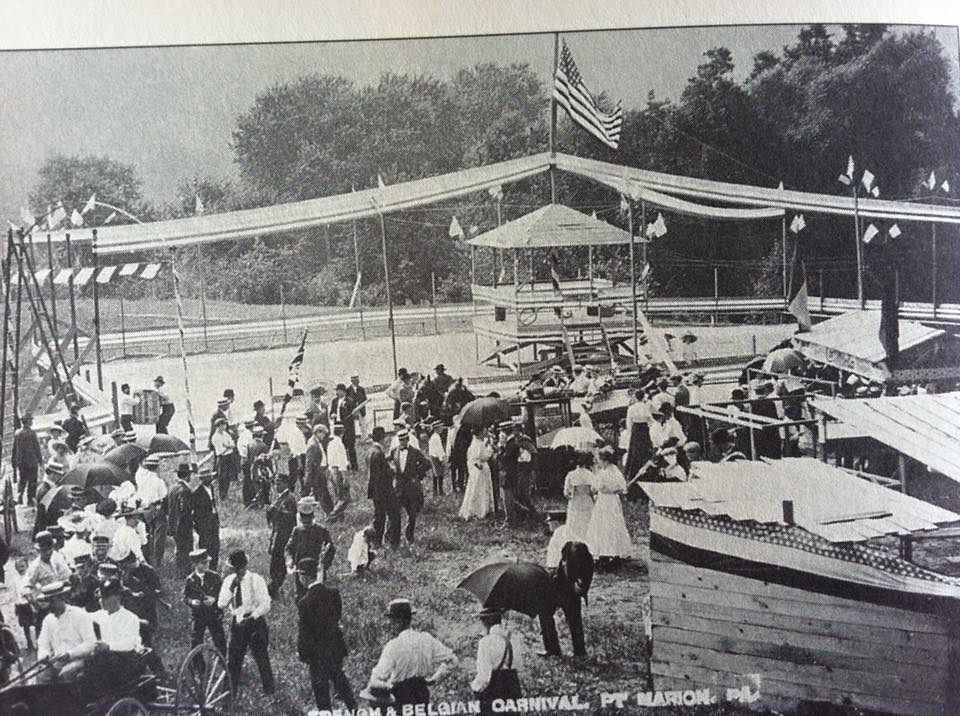
Point Marion's Belgian Carnival in the 1920s

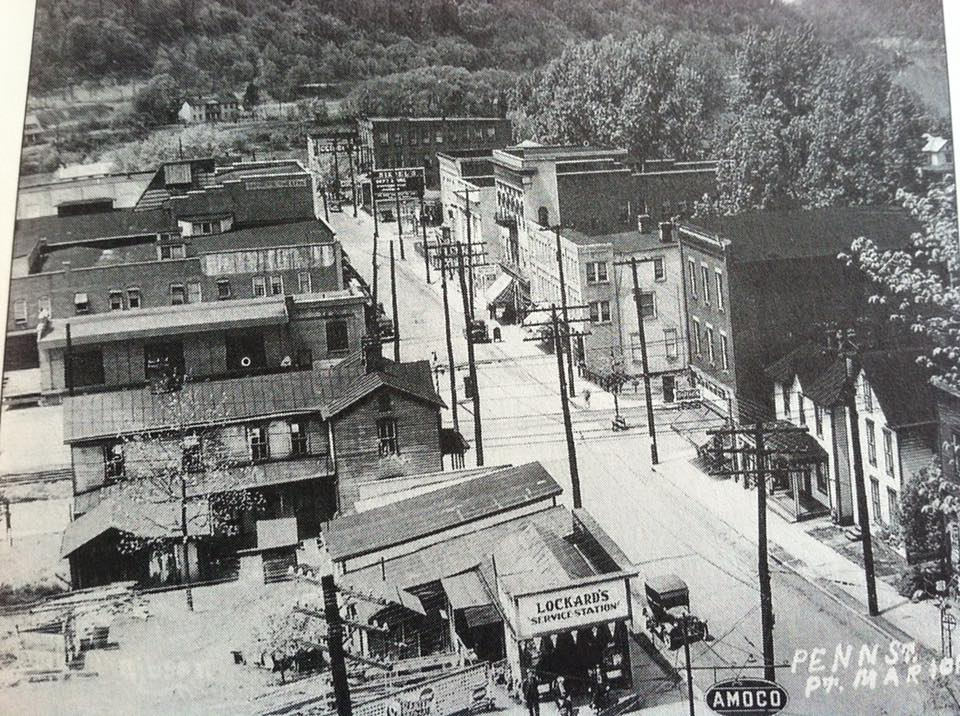
Penn Street during the 1920s

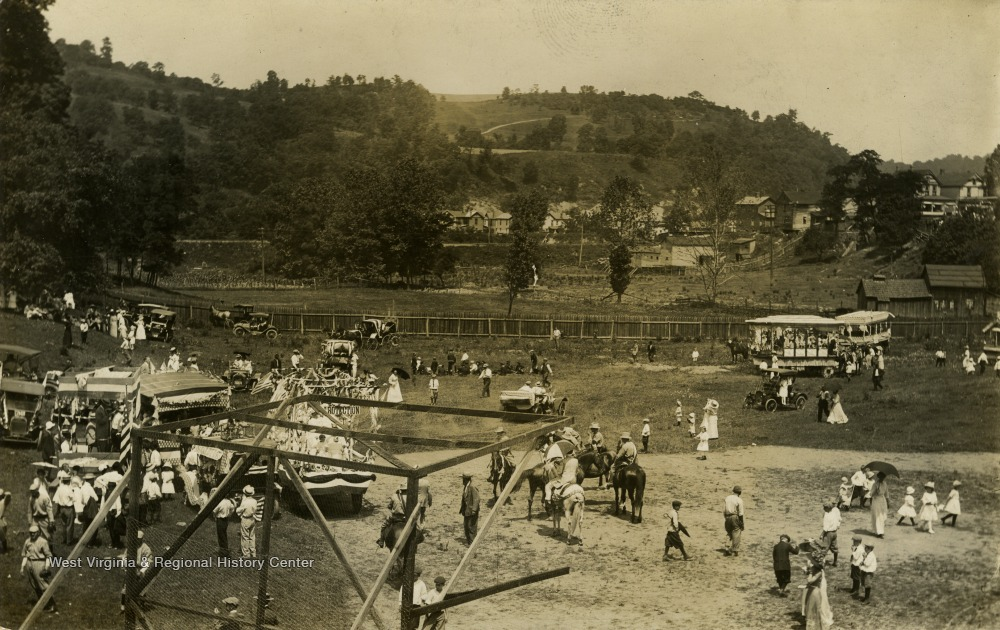
Point Marion Summer Carnival in the 1920s

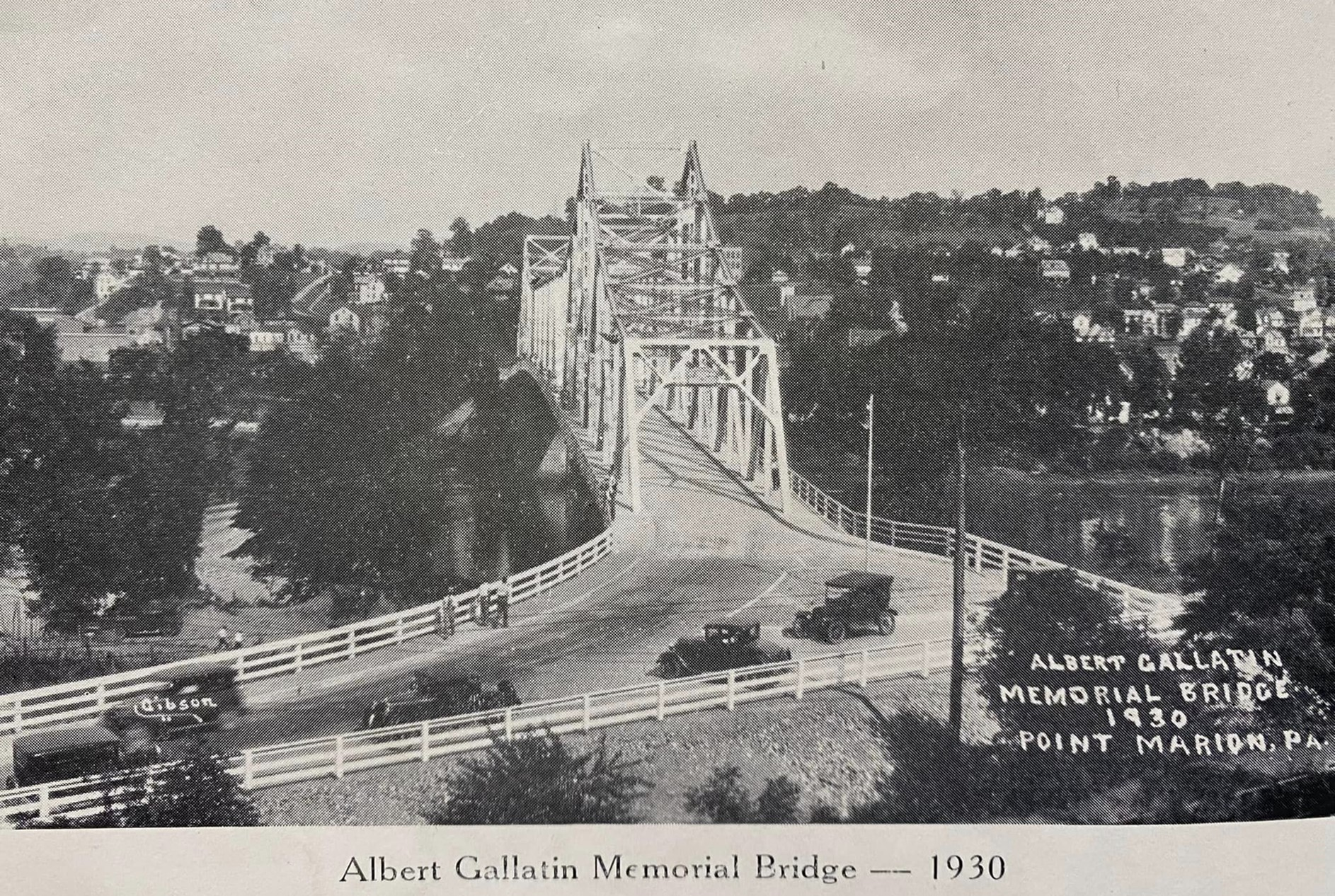
Opening of the Albert Gallatin Memorial Bridge in 1930

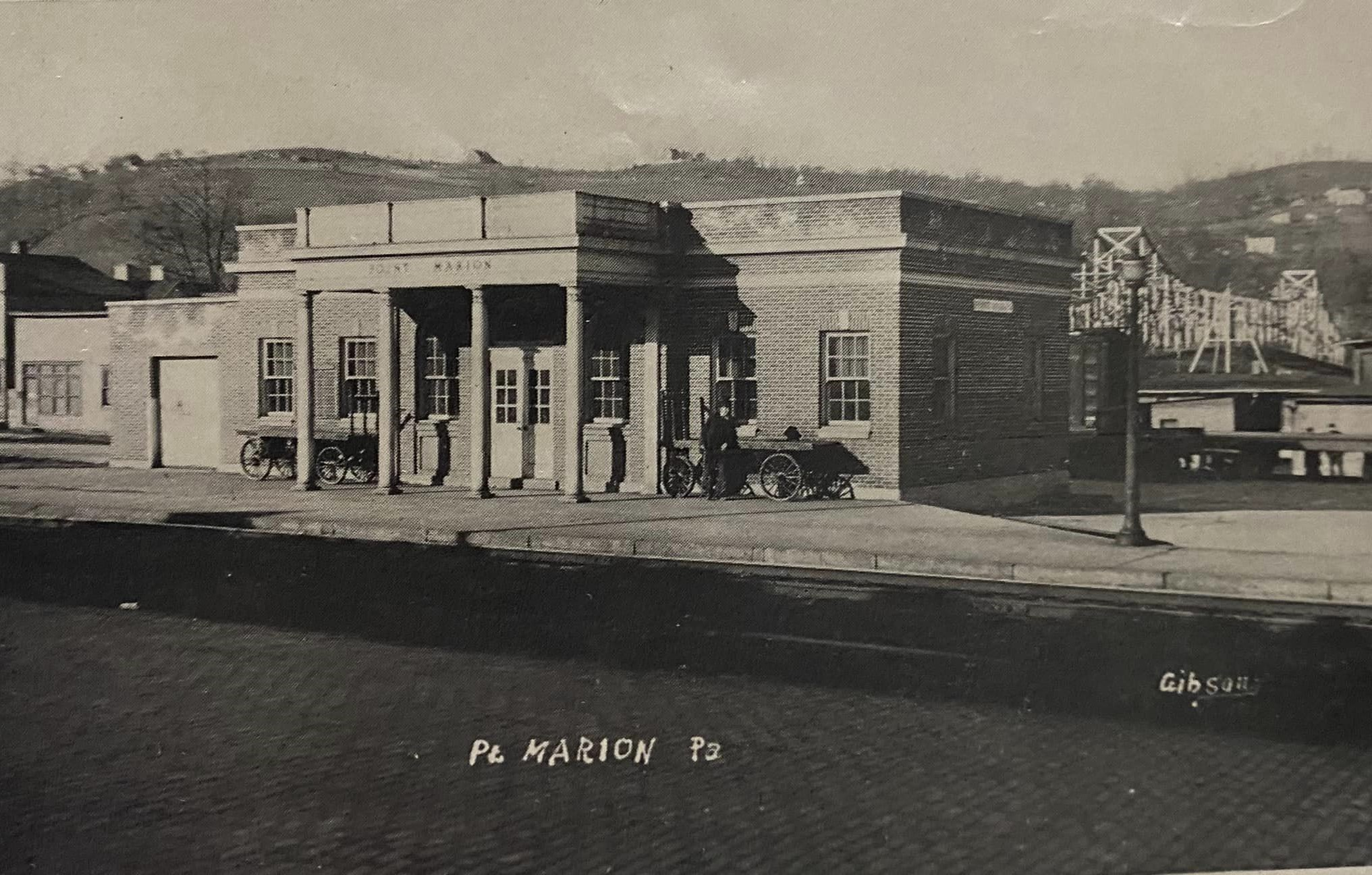
The Baltimore and Ohio Railroad depot in the 1930s

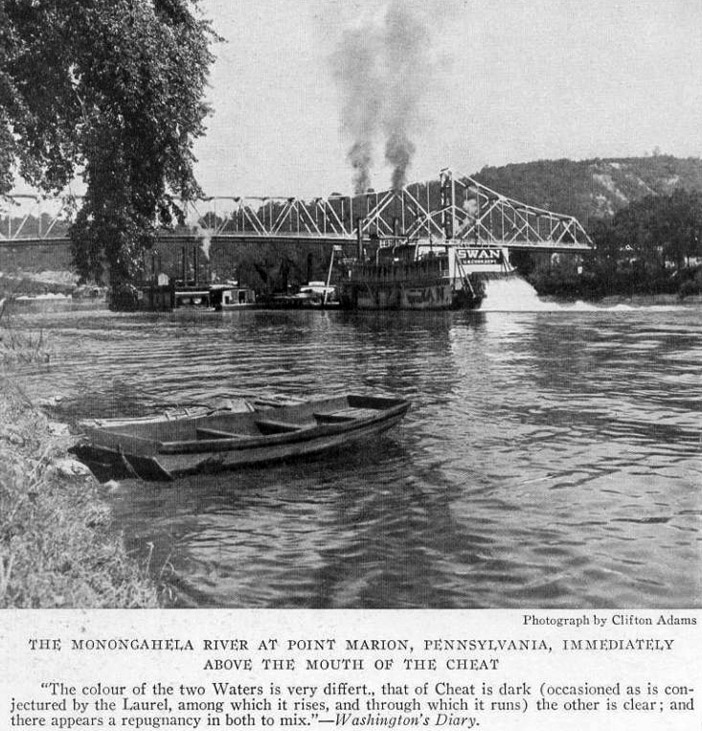
The Albert Gallatin Memorial Bridge in 1932

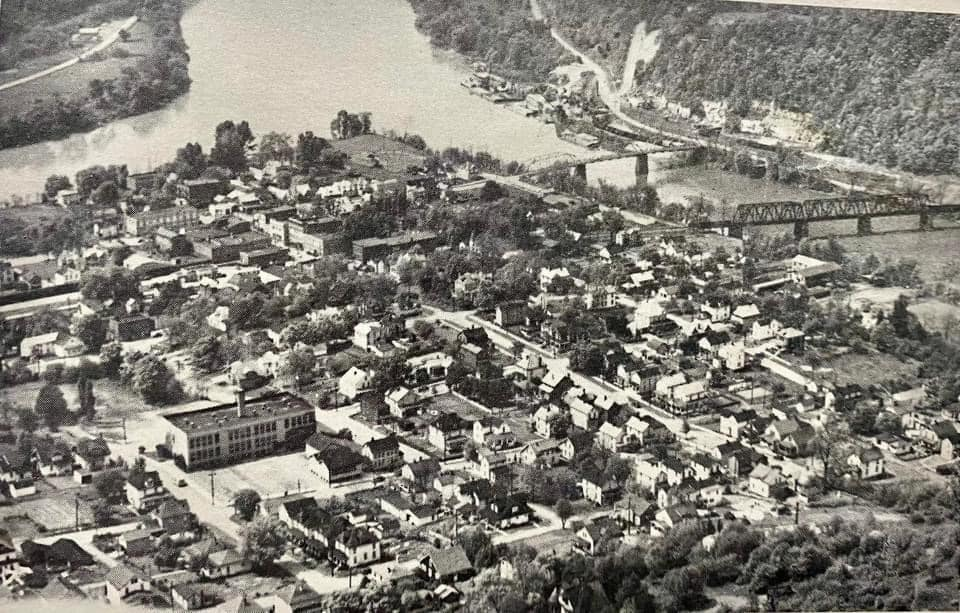
Northward aerial view of Point Marion, circa 1940s

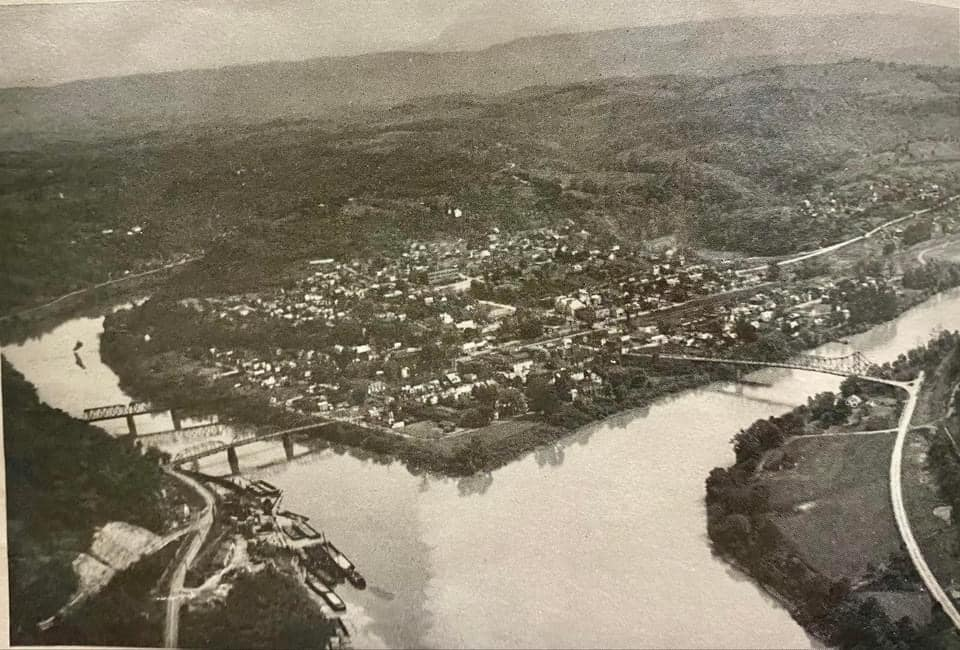
Southward aerial view of Point Marion, circa 1940s

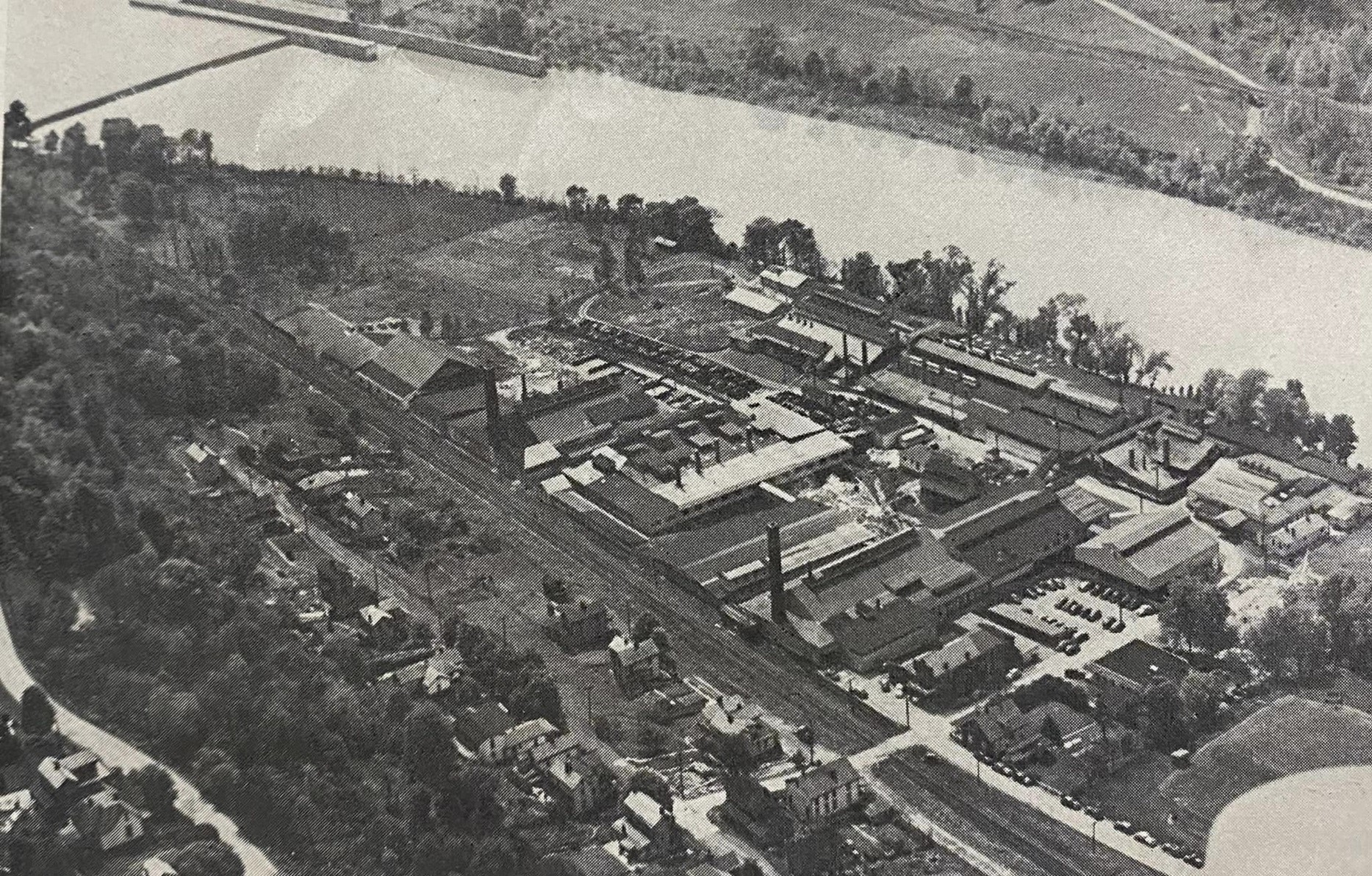
Aerial view of the Houze Glass Factory in 1946

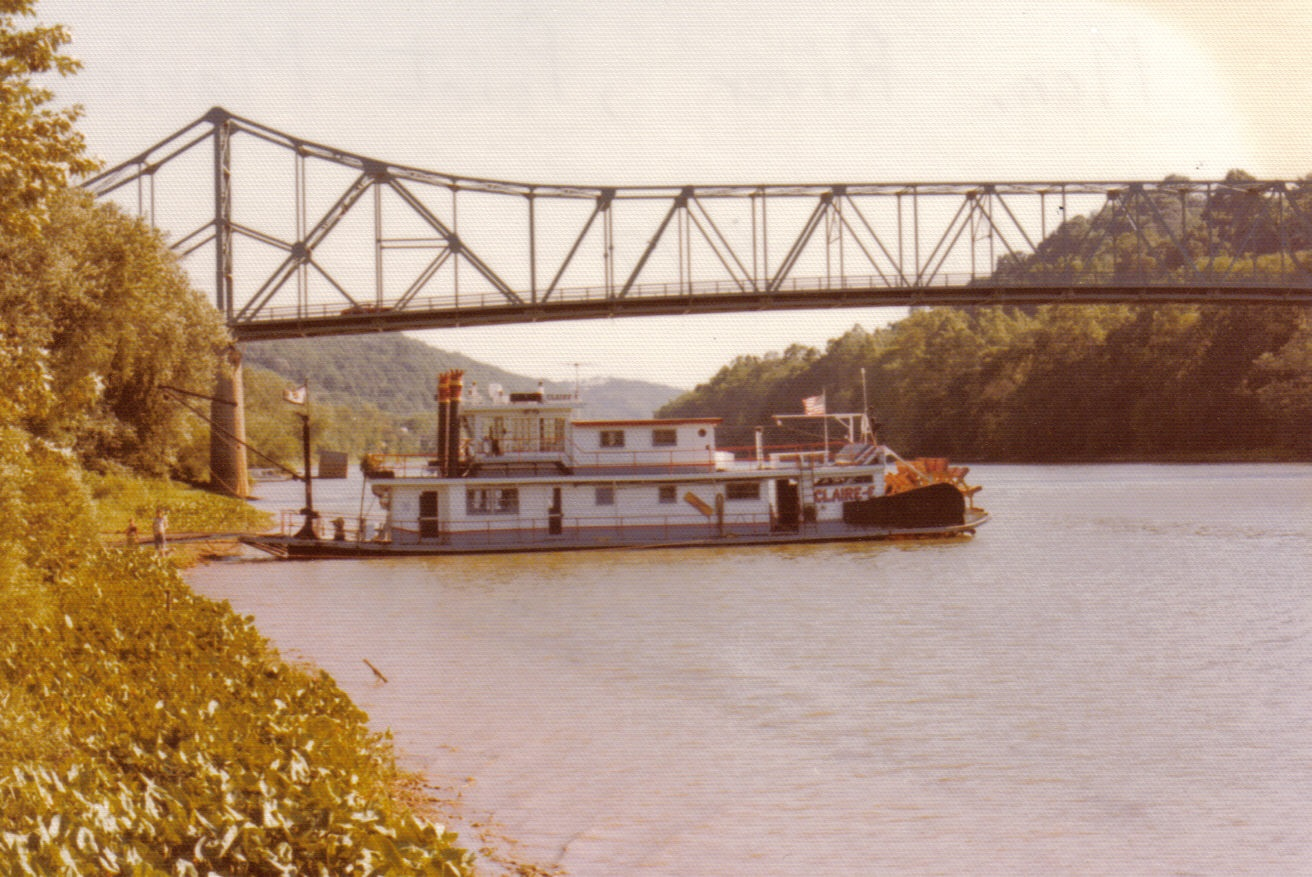
The Albert Gallatin Memorial Bridge on August 1, 1977

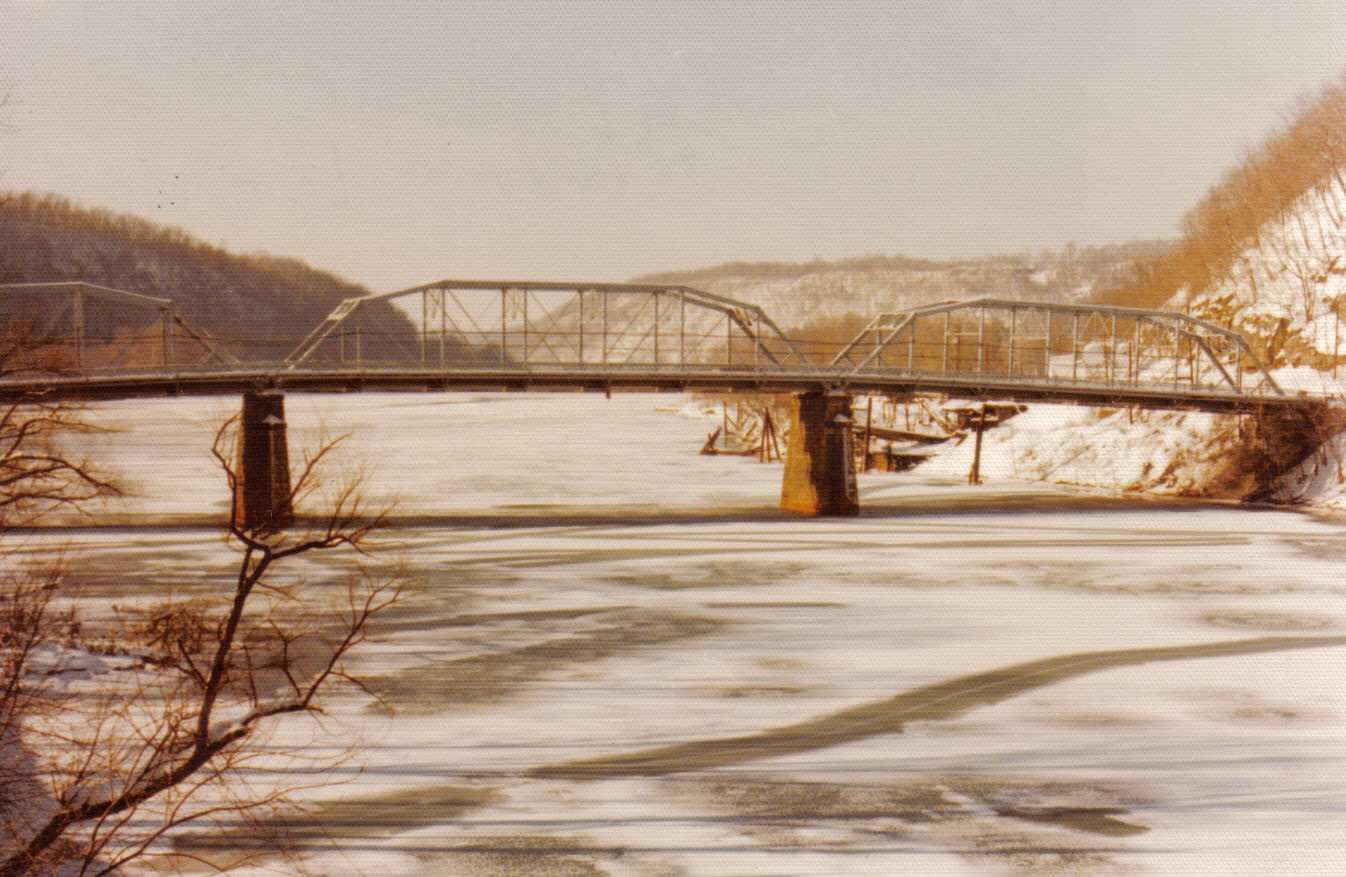
The Cheat River Bridge on January 23, 1978

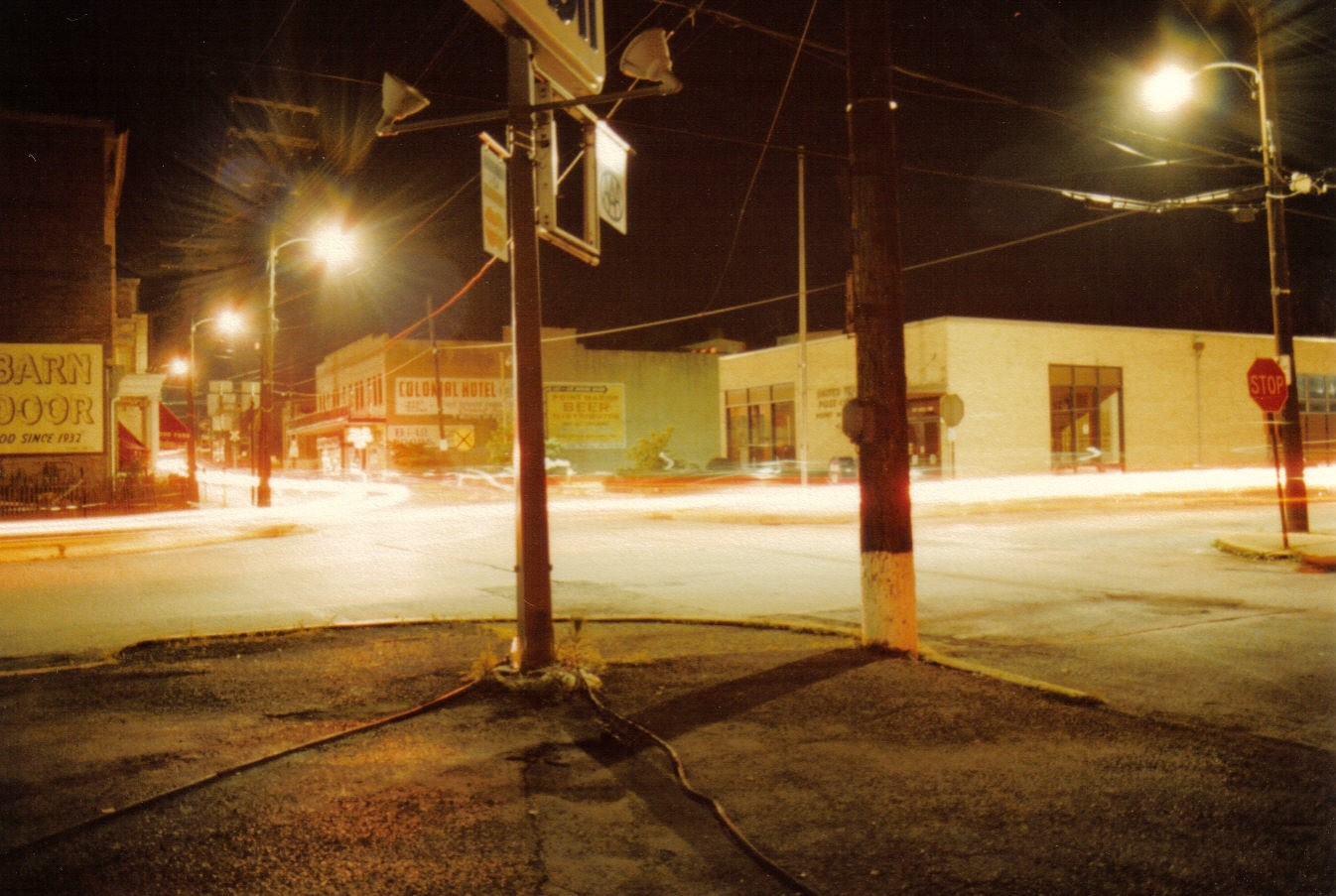
The United States Post Office on June 22, 1981

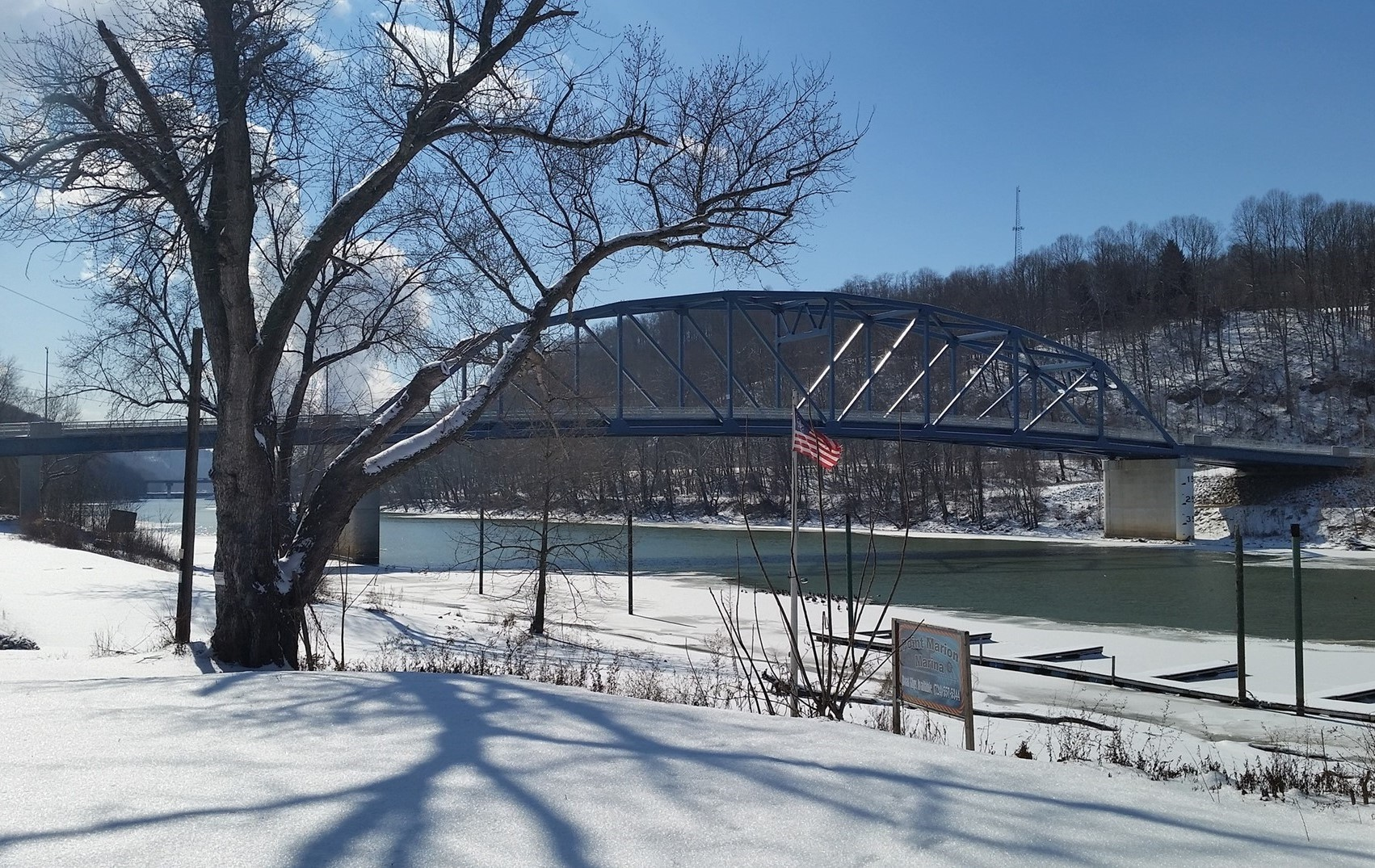
The new Point Marion Bridge on February 17, 2015

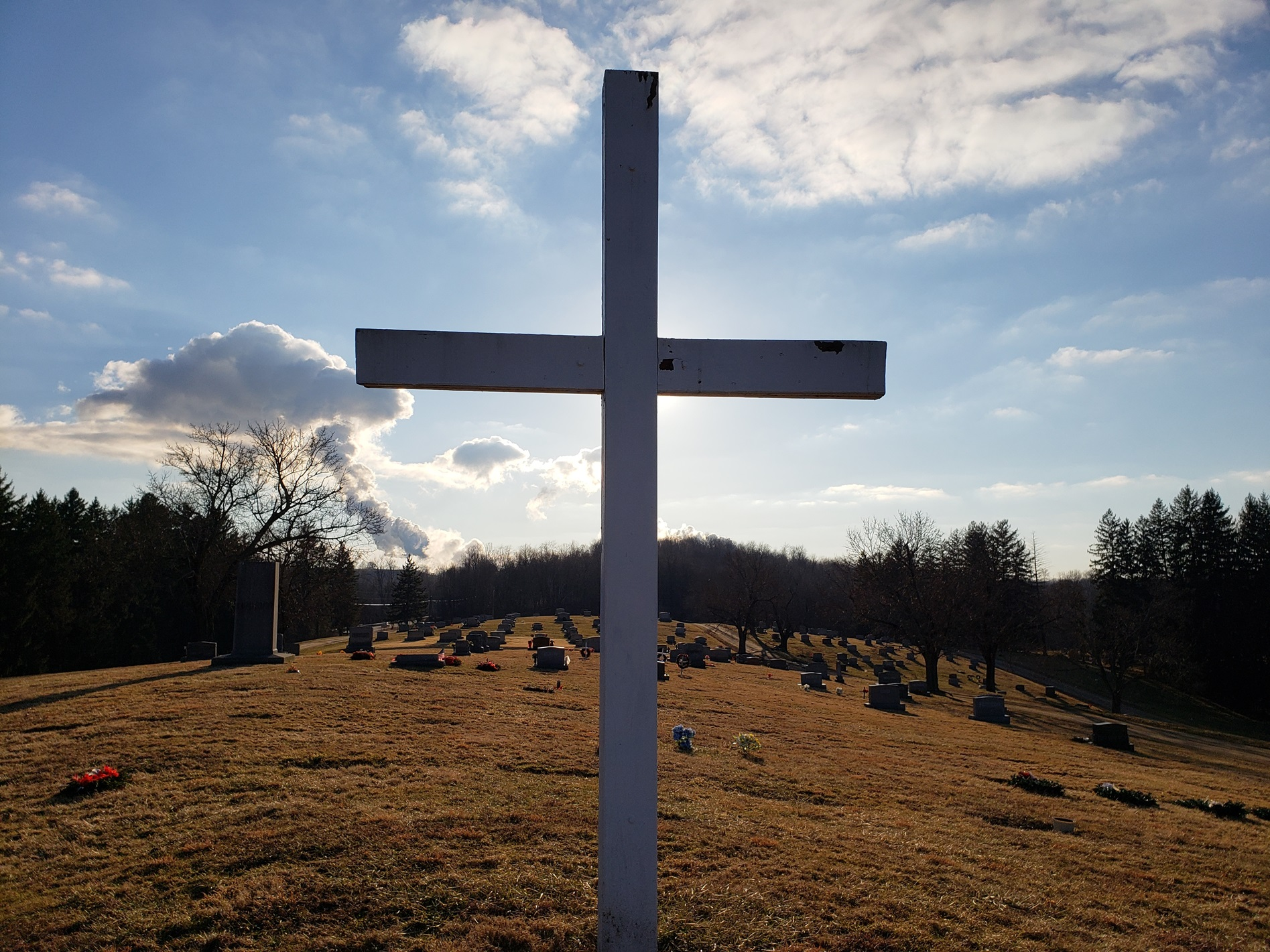
Evergreen Memorial Park Cemetery in February 2019

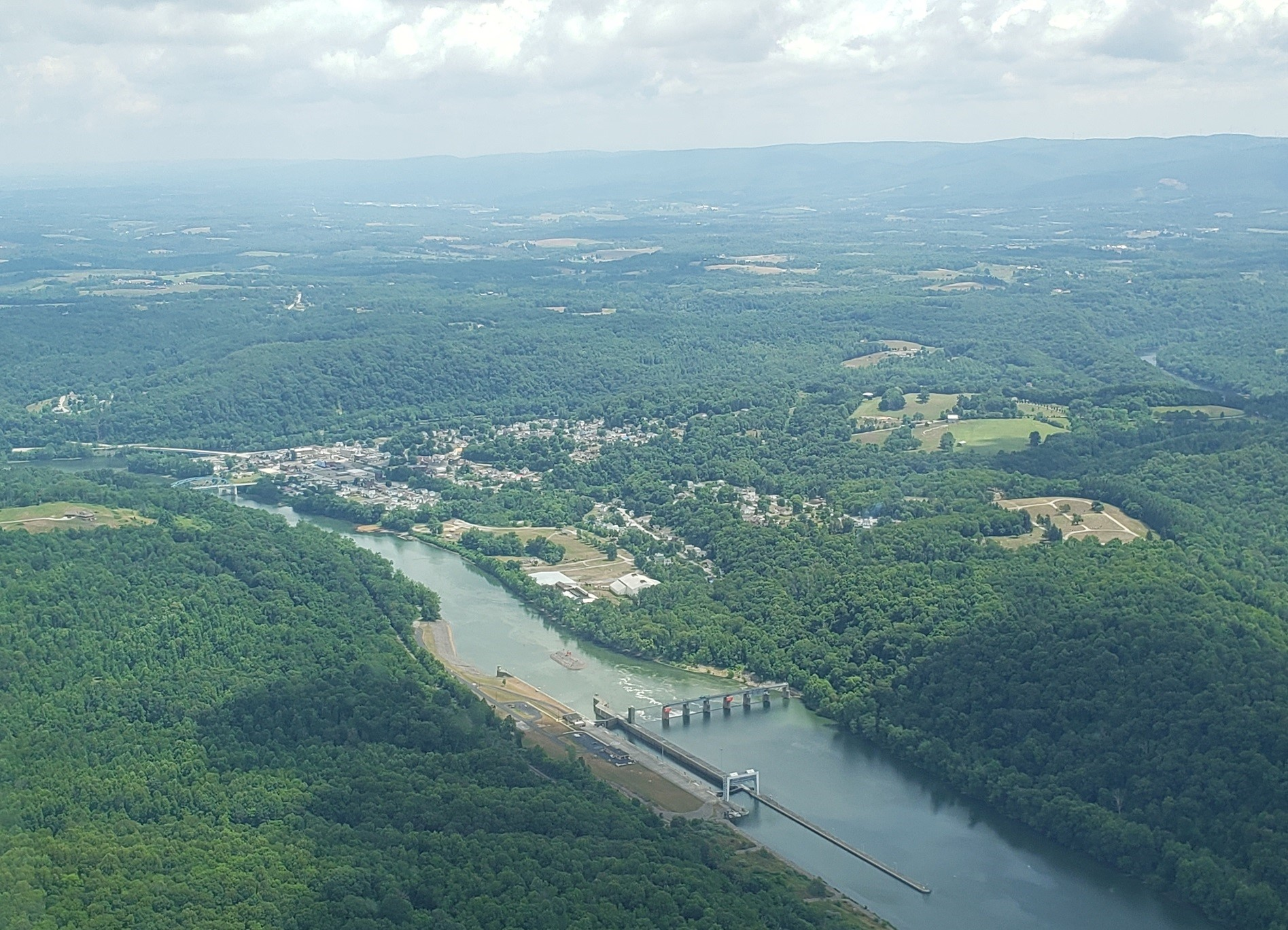
Aerial view of Point Marion on July 17, 2020
