= Secrets of the Alchemist Dar =

Book by Michael Stadther

- Author: Michael Stadther
- Publisher: Treasure Trove Inc
- Publication date: September 2006

Secrets of the Alchemist Dar is a book written by Michael Stadther and published in September 2006 by the author's company, Treasure Trove, Inc. A story about fairies and other imaginary and fantastic creatures, the book includes hidden puzzles for an scavenger hunt with one hundred rings (valued at more than two million dollars) as prizes. The book is a sequel to A Treasure's Trove, another armchair treasure hunt and contains the same characters, although the author has stated at book signings that the puzzles in the two books are not connected.

In 2007, Treasure Trove, Inc. was put into bankruptcy because of a dispute with its distributor, Simon and Schuster. None of the rings are known to have been claimed.
