= Sheepskin Trail =

Non-motorized rail-trail in Fayette County, Pennsylvania

Coordinates: 39.9008°N 79.7276°W

- Length: 7.7 mi (12.4 km)
- Location: Fayette County Pennsylvania
- Trailheads: Dunbar, Pennsylvania; Dunbar Township at Junction with Youghiogheny River Trail South, part of the Great Allegheny Passage Trail System
- Use: Hiking, Biking
- Hazards: Railroad Crossing

The Sheepskin Trail is a non-motorized rail-trail in Fayette County, Pennsylvania. It is planned to eventually link the Great Allegheny Passage trail system near Dunbar to the Mon River Trail system at the Pennsylvania/West Virginia state line near Point Marion. Currently, three segments of the trail have been completed, with more in development.

== History ==
In 1997, a feasibility study was completed and in 2007, the former Baltimore and Ohio Railroad line was purchased and Phase 1, which cost $647,927, was opened in May 2008.

The name of the trail comes from an old name for the railroad line. When it first opened, the trains scattered the sheep grazing in the area, and it was referred to as the Sheepskin Line.

== Route ==
As of June 2026, three segments of the trail are open.

The southernmost segment starts at the Pennsylvania/West Virginia border, connecting with the Mon River Trail. It travels north for 1.7 mi through Point Marion to the Cheat River. Across the U.S. Route 119 bridge over the river, the trail continues southeast along the right bank of the river for another 1.4 mi.

The middle segment runs for 2.5 mi from Hutchinson to Uniontown and features a repurposed covered bridge.

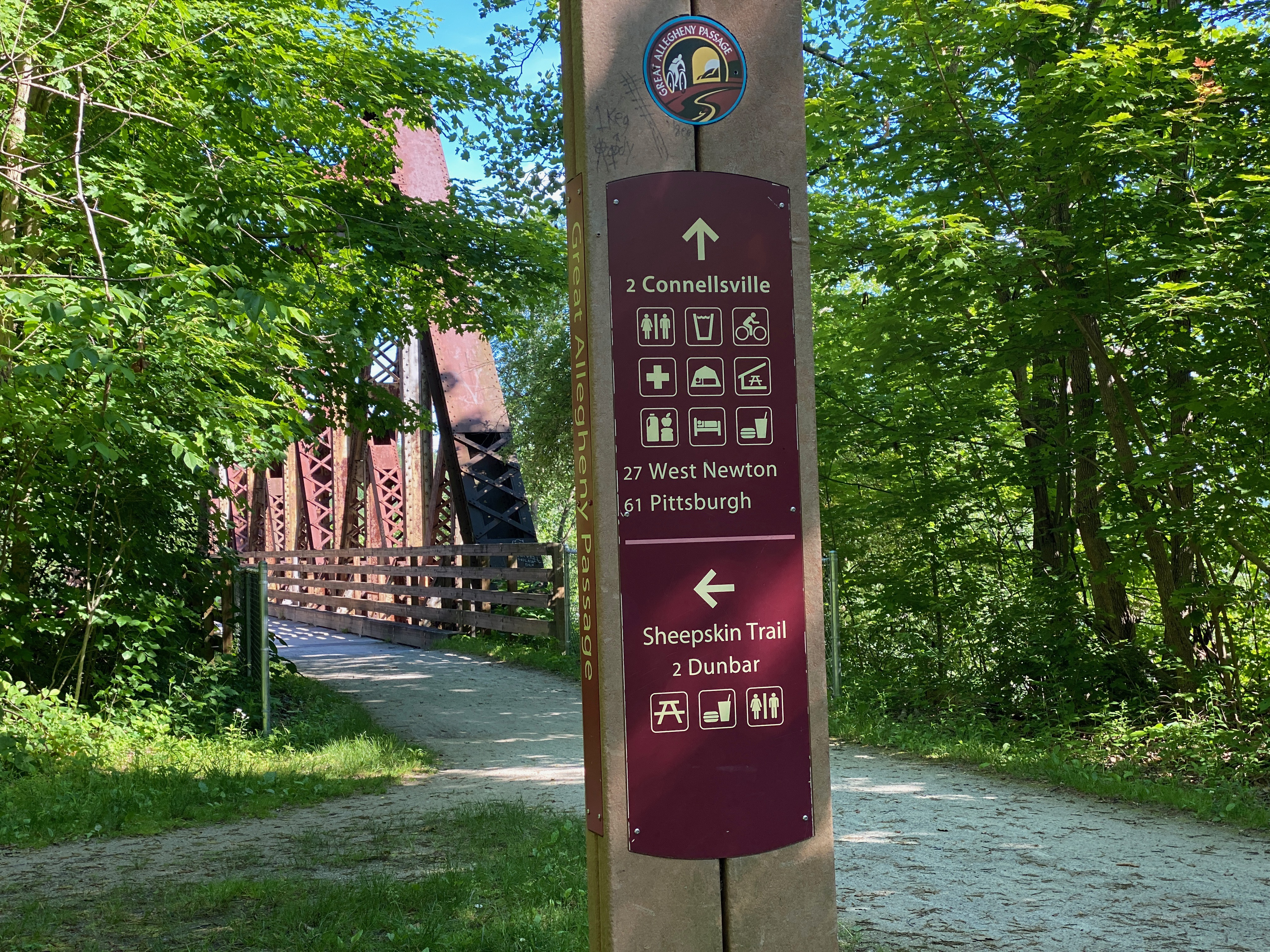
Junction where the Sheepskin Trail meets the Great Allegheny Passage

The northernmost segment runs for 2.1 mi from Dunbar to the Youghiogheny River where it joins the Great Allegheny Passage rail trail.

== Future ==
Plans are being worked on to connect the segments of the trail, with active construction on the middle segment in Uniontown, and an additional 1.4 mi in North Union Township in the final planning stages.

== See also ==
- List of rail trails in Pennsylvania
