= Trove (disambiguation) =

Trove is an Australian library-database aggregator.

Trove may also refer to:

- Trove, a database-as-a-service component of the OpenStack cloud-computing platform
- Trove (app), a personalized web- and iOS-based news-aggregator application
- Trove (video game), a 2015 voxel-based adventure game from Trion Worlds
- Treasure trove, a legal concept
- A Treasure's Trove, a 2004 children's book by Michael Stadther
- "Trove", a 2014 episode of TV series Endeavour (List of Endeavour episodes)
