= Marion County Trail =

The Marion County Trail, better known as the MCTrail, is a rail trail located in Marion County, West Virginia.

Its length is 2.5 miles (4.0 km) and runs alongside Pricketts Creek from Fairmont, West Virginia, to Prickett's Fort State Park and the Monongahela River, where it connects with the Mon River Trail. Near its southwestern trailhead, the trail passes through 1,200-foot (370 m)-long Meredith Tunnel, which is lit.

- Southwest terminus: Winfield St. in Fairmont, West Virginia (39°29′19.4″N 80°06′35.4″W)
- Northeast terminus: Intersection with Mon River Trail (39°31′08.5″N 80°05′35.1″W)

It is paved for its entire length and is designated as a multi-use non-motorized trail suitable for biking, horseback riding, running and walking/day hiking. It has an average 1% grade.
