= Caperton Trail =

Rail trail in West Virginia, United States

The Caperton River Trail is a rail trail located in West Virginia, United States.

The trail runs through an urban area with access to parks, restaurants and shops.

Together with the Mon River Trail and Deckers Creek Trail, it forms a 48-mile (77 km) network of multi-use, non-motorized use, trails connecting Marion County, Monongalia County and Preston County. The entire trail network has been designated a National Recreation Trail by the NRT, National Recreation Trails Program.

== Location ==
- Northern terminus at the connection with the Mon River Trail at the Morgantown, West Virginia northern city limits (39°40′05.8″N 79°58′55.6″W).
- Intersection with the Deckers Creek Trail in Hazel Ruby McQuain Riverfront Park in Morgantown (39°37′43.1″N 79°57′37.1″W).
- Southern terminus at the connection with the Mon River Trail along US 119 at Morgantown southern city limits (39°36′29.1″N 79°58′13.1″W).
