= Deckers Creek Trail =

Rail trail in West Virginia, United States

The Deckers Creek Trail is a rail trail located in West Virginia.

The 19-mile (31 km) trail climbs a 2% grade, rising 1,000 feet (300 m) in elevation as it runs through the deciduous forests, hemlock groves, open fields and farmlands in Preston County.

Together with the Mon River Trail and Caperton Trail, it forms a 48-mile (77 km) network of multi-use, non-motorized use, trails connecting Marion County, Monongalia County and Preston County.

== Location ==
- Western terminus at the intersection with the Deckers Creek Trail in Hazel Ruby McQuain Riverfront Park in Morgantown, West Virginia (39°37′43.1″N 79°57′37.1″W).
- Eastern terminus at County Route 56 east of Reedsville, West Virginia (39°30′10.3″N 79°46′58.3″W).
