= Mon River Trail =

Rail trail in West Virginia, United States

The Mon River Trail is a rail trail located in West Virginia, United States.

The trail is composed of two separate sections - the north section and the south section, which are connected by the Caperton Trail.

It is relatively flat and follows the Monongahela River in a wooded valley.

Together with the Caperton Trail and Deckers Creek Trail, it forms a 48-mile (77 km) network of multi-use, non-motorized use, trails connecting Marion County, Monongalia County and Preston County.

== Location ==
=== North Section ===
- Northern terminus is the Pennsylvania state line near Stewartstown, West Virginia where it connects to the Sheepskin Trail (39°43′14.1″N 79°54′53.3″W).
- Southern terminus at the connection with the Caperton Trail at Morgantown, West Virginia northern city limits (39°40′05.8″N 79°58′55.6″W).

=== South Section ===
- Northeastern terminus at the connection with the Caperton Trail along US 119 at Morgantown southern city limits (39°36′29.1″N 79°58′13.1″W).
- Southwestern terminus at the connection with the Marion County Trail in Prickett's Fort State Park (39°31′08.5″N 80°05′35.1″W)

== See also ==
- Sheepskin Trail
