= A Treasure's Trove =

Children's book

A Treasure's Trove: A Fairy Tale About Real Treasure for Parents and Children of All Ages is an illustrated children's book written by Michael Stadther and published in 2004 by Treasure Trove Inc, which he incorporated to do so. The "real treasure" was found by deciphering clues in the book that led to fourteen tokens that could be turned in for unique jewels, each representing an insect or character from the book, or a cash prize representing one third of the jewel's value. Initially, it was reported that there were twelve jewels, however, it subsequently emerged that there were fourteen prizes. In 2005, it was reported that film rights for A Treasure's Trove had been acquired by Cruise/Wagner Productions, however, apart from a reported trailer being in development in the New York Times, there has been no further news.

== Synopsis ==
The book is about twelve forest creatures whose mates disappear after being crystallized by a dark dust that falls every evening. The forest creatures combine forces with Zac (the handsome woodcarver), Ana (his beautiful half-elf, half-human wife), and their timid, chubby, winged "doth" Pook (inspired by the author's dog Misty) to save the creatures and restore the dying forest.

== Treasure hunt ==
Inside the book are clues to fourteen tokens that were hidden in parks throughout the United States, which could be redeemed for jewels representing characters from the story. The unique jewels, which were collectively valued at one million dollars, have now all been found, and a book showing the solutions has been published. Stadther subsequently published another book with a new treasure hunt, Secrets of the Alchemist Dar.

Three of the Treasure's Trove jewels were original pieces, including a 19th-century Russian grasshopper, a snail and a ladybug. Another jewel, representing the villain Rusful, was an uncut black diamond. The rest of the jewels were made by Robert Q. Underhill of Jewelry Designs in Danbury, Connecticut. He was commissioned after Stadther noticed a hummingbird brooch in his shop while looking for a gift for his wife.

They are as follows:

Jewel	Materials used	Location of token
Ant	Spessartite garnets and clear diamonds	Swanny City Park, Moab, Utah.
Bee	Black cultured Tahitian pearl; clear, yellow and black diamonds; and plique-à-jour enamel	Santa Rosa Lake State Park, New Mexico.
Beetle	Tanzanite; clear, yellow and black diamonds; with enamel	Badlands National Park, South Dakota
Butterfly	Clear diamonds; sapphires; and black enamel	Nantahala National Forest, North Carolina
Caterpillar	Peridots; green diamonds; amethysts and plique-à-jour enamel	Lake Dardanelle State Park, Arkansas
Dragonfly	Sapphires; clear diamonds; and plique-à-jour enamel	Ricketts Glen State Park, Pennsylvania
Firefly	Alexandrite; Burmese ruby; yellow and clear diamonds; and black enamel	Foss State Park, Oklahoma
Grasshopper	Antique 19th century ornament made in Russia. Green garnets, ruby and diamonds set in gold and silver.	James Baird State Park, New York
Hummingbird	South Sea pearl; clear, black and yellow diamonds; emeralds and rubies	Jackson, Wyoming
Ladybug	Original ornament made of rubies and diamonds	Paintsville Lake State Park, Kentucky
Pook	Hand-carved rock quartz, platinum, and plique-à-jour enamel	Newaygo State Park, Michigan.
Rusful	Uncut black diamond	Golden Gate Park, San Francisco
Snail	Original ornament.	Lake Anita State Park, Iowa
Spider	Kashmir sapphire; yellow diamond; and clear diamonds	Prickett's Fort State Park, West Virginia

The Treasure's Trove Jewels were exhibited at the Carnegie Museum in 2004.
