= Allingdale, West Virginia =

Unincorporated community in West Virginia, United States

Allingdale
- Unincorporated community
- Location within the state of West Virginia
- Coordinates: 38°21′32″N 80°36′44″W
- Country: United States
- State: West Virginia
- County: Nicholas
- Time zone: UTC-5 (Eastern (EST))
  - Summer (DST): UTC-4 (EDT)
- GNIS feature ID: 1550097

Allingdale is an unincorporated community in northeastern Nicholas County, West Virginia, United States. The town is located along West Virginia Route 20, near the intersection with Strouds Creek Road and the Webster County line.
