= Prickett's Fort State Park =

State Park in Marion County, West Virginia

- IUCN category III (natural monument or feature)
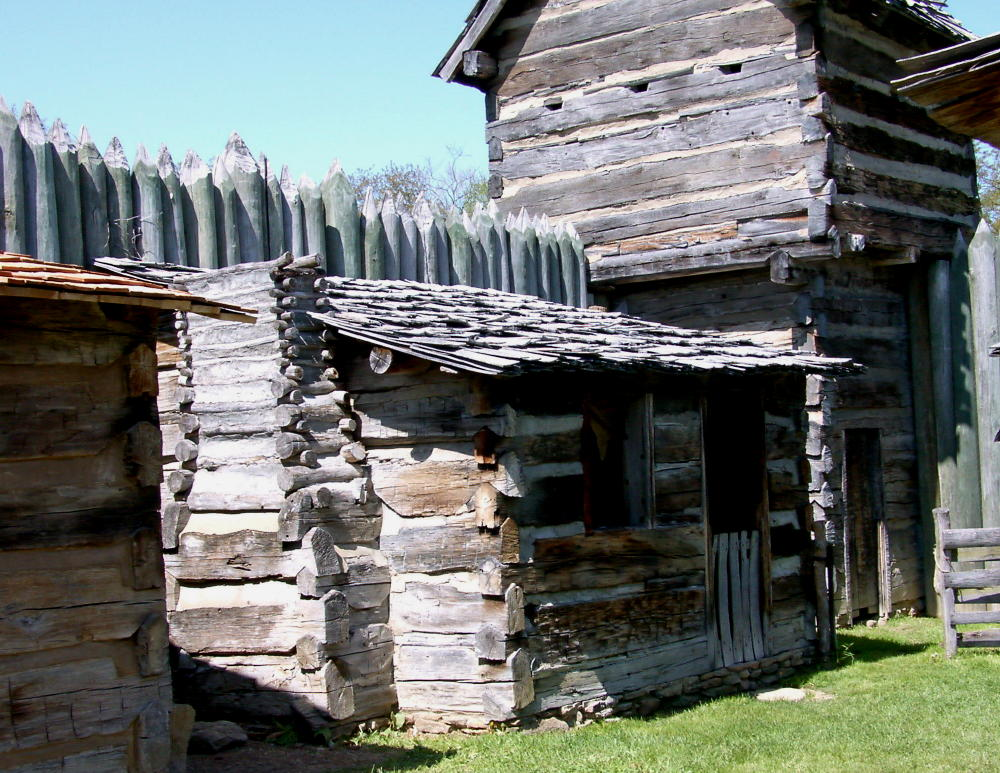
- Prickett's Fort reconstruction

- Location within West Virginia
- Location: Marion, West Virginia, United States
- Coordinates: 39°30′55″N 80°05′53″W
- Area: 22 acres (8.9 ha)
- Elevation: 971 ft (296 m)
- Established: 1975
- Named for: Prickett's Fort
- Governing body: West Virginia Division of Natural Resources
- Operator: Prickett's Fort Memorial Foundation
- Website: wvstateparks.com/park/pricketts-fort-state-park/
- Prickett Bay Boat Launching Site
- U.S. National Register of Historic Places
- Location: Near Fairmont, West Virginia
- Area: 216 acres (87 ha)
- Built: 1773
- NRHP reference No.: 74002404
- Added to NRHP: February 13, 1974

Prickett's Fort State Park is a 188-acre (76.1 ha) West Virginia state park north of Fairmont, near the confluence of Prickett's Creek and the Monongahela River. The park features a reconstructed refuge fort and commemorates life on the Virginia frontier during the late 18th century.

== Historic fort ==
Historic Prickett's Fort was built to defend early European settlers of what today is West Virginia from raids by hostile Native Americans, a portion of whose territory the settlers appropriated after the Treaty of Fort Stanwix (1768). After a band of settlers led by Daniel Greathouse perpetrated the Yellow Creek massacre in 1774, initiating Lord Dunmore's War, all settlers in the Ohio River Valley were in peril from Native American attack.

Because there was safety in numbers, the settlers built a number of refuge forts, including one on the homestead of Jacob Prickett. Fairly simple in design, Prickett's Fort was little more than a hundred-foot-square log palisade built around Prickett's house. Native Americans tended to avoid such strong points, preferring to ambush small work parties.

When the frontiersmen believed they were in danger of Native American attack, families gathered at such a fortified area, a procedure called "forting up". In 1774, there were at least a hundred such palisades, blockhouses, and "stations" in the Monongahela Valley, many within a thirty-mile radius of Prickett's Fort. Perhaps as many as eighty families—several hundred people—gathered at Prickett's Fort during crisis periods, where they stayed for days or even weeks. Prickett's Fort was never attacked, although militiamen from the confluence area were killed by Native Americans elsewhere.

== Reconstruction ==
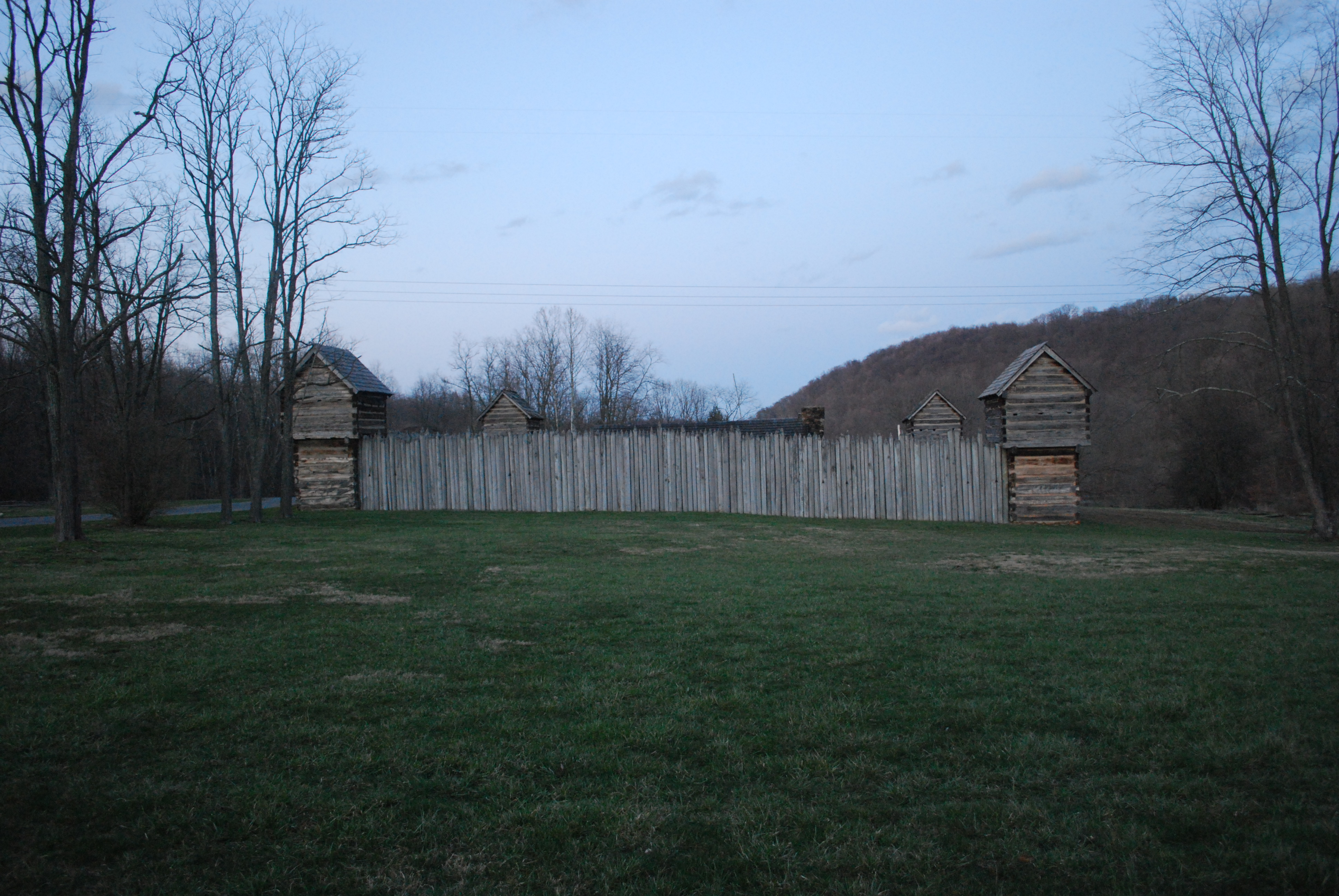
Prickett's Fort reconstruction.

The last written mention of Prickett's Fort occurred in 1780. In 1916, the Sons of the American Revolution dedicated a monument in honor of settlers who built the fort. When, in 1973, the traditional site of the fort was threatened by a Department of Natural Resources parking lot, the Marion County Historical Society created the Prickett's Fort Memorial Foundation and announced plans to reconstruct the historic structure. Discovering that the original fort site had probably been destroyed by the building of a railroad bridge in 1905, the Foundation decided to put the reconstruction on a small hill overlooking the river. Many old buildings donated to the project were torn down to provide timbers for the reconstruction. A Reconstruction Details Committee decided to design the fort reconstruction on the basis of a description by Stephen Morgan, the son of an early settler. The current reconstruction is 110 square feet (10 m^{2}) with two-story blockhouses at each corner, fourteen small cabins lining internal walls, and a meeting house and store house in the common area. Unfortunately, the Morgan account was an inaccurate, perhaps even fraudulent, guide. The Prickett's Fort Memorial Foundation describes the 1974 reconstruction as "much more elaborate" than the original but claims that every feature in the reconstruction might have been found at some refuge fort in the region.

== Features ==
In the reconstructed fort, the Foundation presents third-person interpretation of such 18th-century crafts as carpentry, blacksmithing, and spinning. A visitor center—managed by the Foundation under long-term contract with the state—includes a research library, a gift shop, and a gallery with an orientation exhibit and video.

Immediately south of the fort reconstruction, the Job Prickett House, built in 1859 by a great-grandson of Jacob Prickett, displays original furnishings and tools. This typical 19th-century farmhouse is listed on the National Register of Historic Places.

Recreational facilities at Prickett's Fort include a 400-seat outdoor amphitheater, picnic areas, nature trails, and a boat launch. The outdoor amphitheater is used by the Fairmont State University theater department each summer for musicals and dramatic productions. Prickett's Fort State Park provides access to both the MCPARC trail to Fairmont and the Mon River Trail to Morgantown. An accessibility study by West Virginia University determined that most park features were accessible to persons with disabilities.

== Popular culture ==
Prickett's Fort State Park, is a location in Fallout 76, as Prickett's Fort

== See also ==
- Jacob Prickett, Jr. Log House
- List of West Virginia state parks
- State park
