= New Salem-Buffington, Pennsylvania =

New Salem-Buffington
- Former CDP
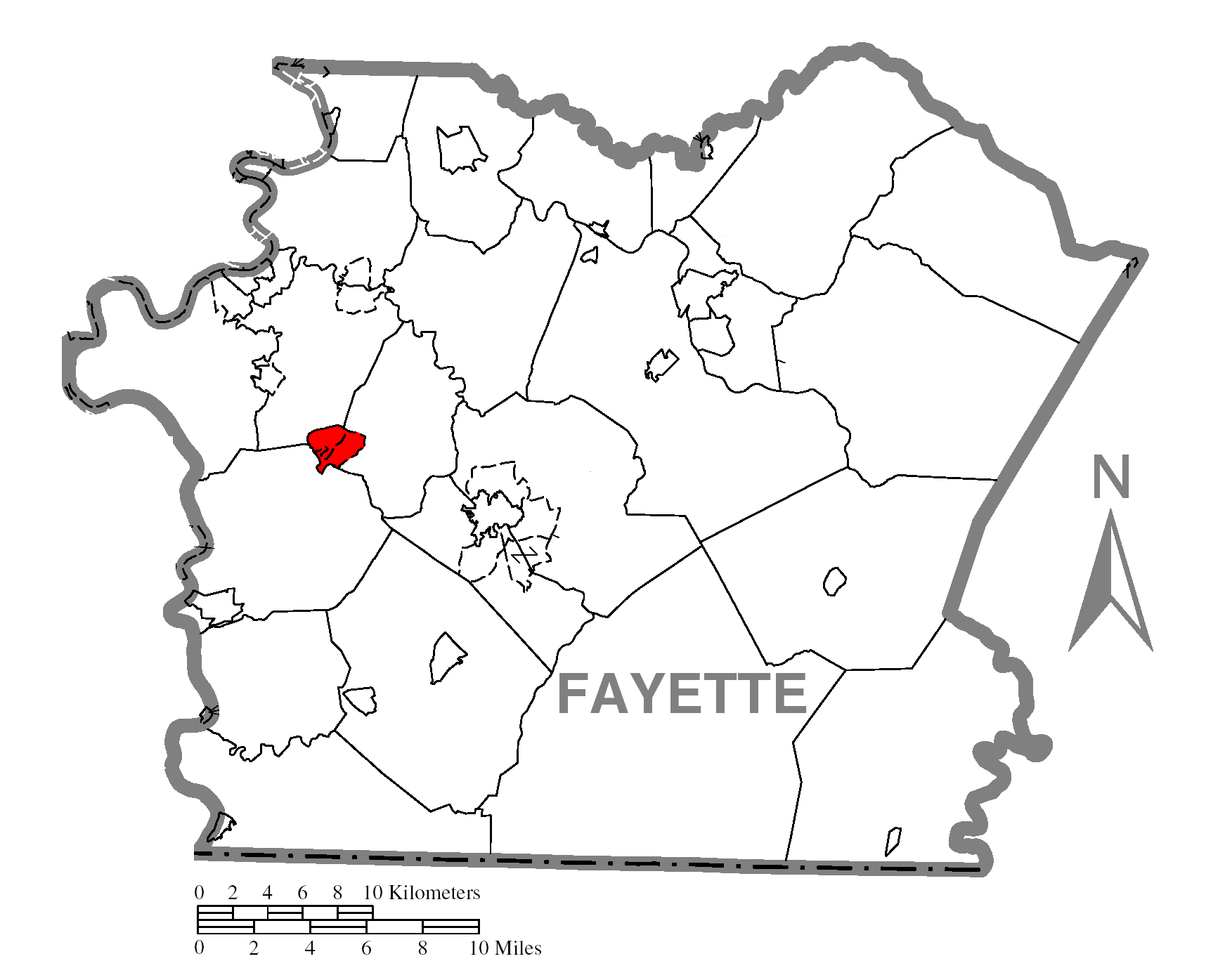
- Location of New Salem-Buffington in Fayette County
- Coordinates: 39°55′31″N 79°50′16″W
- Country: United States
- State: Pennsylvania
- County: Fayette

Area
  - Total: 1.2 sq mi (3.1 km^{2})

Population (2000)
  - Total: 808
  - Density: 670/sq mi (260/km^{2})
- Time zone: UTC-4 (EST)
  - Summer (DST): UTC-5 (EDT)
- Area code: 724

New Salem-Buffington was a census-designated place (CDP) in Fayette County, Pennsylvania, United States, and part of the Pittsburgh Metro Area. The population was 808 at the 2000 census. For the 2010 census the area was split into two CDPs, New Salem and Buffington. Both communities are located in Menallen Township.

== Geography ==
New Salem-Buffington was located at 39°55′31″N 79°50′16″W (39.925298, −79.837655).

According to the United States Census Bureau, the CDP had a total area of 1.2 square miles (3.1 km^{2}), all of it land.

== Demographics ==
As of the 2000 census, there were 808 people, 318 households, and 232 families residing in the CDP. The population density was 685.8 inhabitants per square mile (264.8/km^{2}). There were 362 housing units at an average density of 307.3 per square mile (118.6/km^{2}). The racial makeup of the CDP was 93.19% White, 6.56% African American and 0.25% Native American. Hispanic or Latino of any race were 0.12% of the population.

There were 318 households, out of which 29.9% had children under the age of 18 living with them, 52.2% were married couples living together, 16.7% had a female householder with no husband present, and 27.0% were non-families. 25.2% of all households were made up of individuals, and 14.5% had someone living alone who was 65 years of age or older. The average household size was 2.54 and the average family size was 3.01.

In the CDP, the population was spread out, with 23.3% under the age of 18, 8.0% from 18 to 24, 26.1% from 25 to 44, 23.3% from 45 to 64, and 19.3% who were 65 years of age or older. The median age was 40 years. For every 100 females, there were 76.4 males. For every 100 females age 18 and over, there were 77.7 males.

The median income for a household in the CDP was $28,875, and the median income for a family was $34,643. Males had a median income of $21,406 versus $16,607 for females. The per capita income for the CDP was $13,508. About 13.0% of families and 15.5% of the population were below the poverty line, including 14.8% of those under age 18 and 13.8% of those age 65 or over.

== Notable people ==
- Ernie Davis, born in New Salem on December 14, 1939, moved to Uniontown and then to Elmira, New York. He was the first African American to win the Heisman Trophy.
- Robert J. Cenker, born in Uniontown, Pa., November 5, 1948, lived in Buffington/New Salem through 1973. He was an RCA payload specialist and flew on Space Shuttle Columbia on mission 61-C, January 12–18, 1986.
