= Menallen Township Sewer Authority =

Sewage Treatment Agency overview
- Jurisdiction: Menallen Township, Fayette County, Pennsylvania
- Headquarters: Uniontown, Pennsylvania
- Website: menallen.org/menallen-township-sewer-authority/

Menallen Township Sewer Authority is an agency that provides sewage treatment to populated areas of Menallen Township, Fayette County, Pennsylvania. There are approximately 1,200 customers on the system.

== Service Areas ==
Service is provided to those living in the following areas:

- New Salem-Buffington
- Keisterville
- Waltersburg
- Haddenville
- Dearth

The system also serves areas around US Route 40, State Route 21, and State Route 51.

== Fees/Costs ==
| Service | Fee |
|---|---|
| Tap-in Fee (One-Time) | $1,800 per Unit |
| Base Service Charge (Monthly) | $38.00 per Unit |
| Additional Surcharge | On each additional 1,000 gallons used per month |

== Office Location ==
Office location is in the Menallen Township Municipal Building, located at Searight's Crossroads.

== Meetings ==
Meetings are held monthly at the Menallen Township Municipal Building.
