= Abel Colley Tavern =

Historic tavern in Pennsylvania, United States

- U.S. National Register of Historic Places
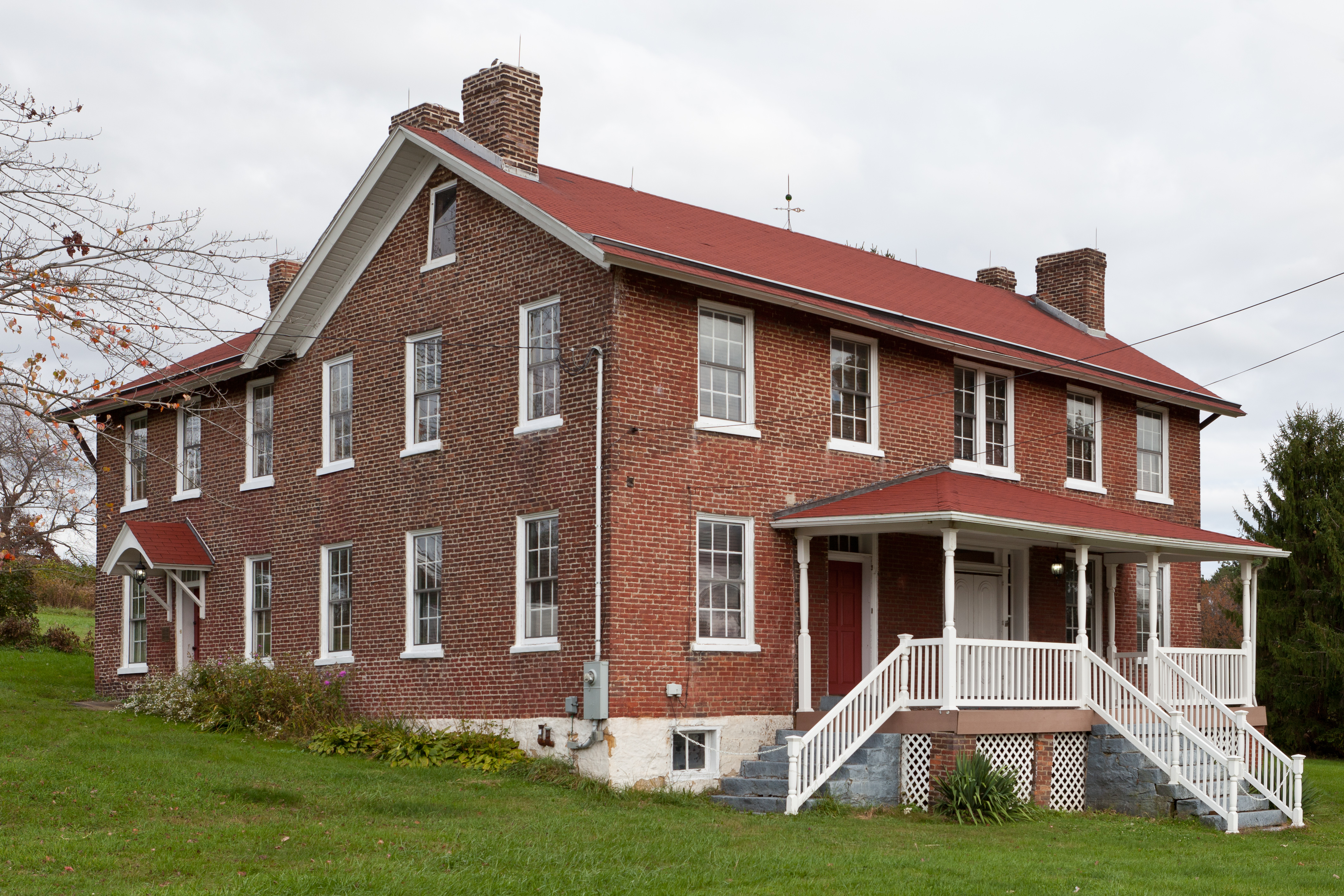

- Location within Pennsylvania Location within the United States
- Location: U.S. Route 40, approximately 0.5 miles (0.80 km) west of Searights Crossroads, Menallen Township, Pennsylvania
- Coordinates: 39°57′34″N 79°49′1″W
- Area: 0 acres (0 ha)
- Built: c. 1835
- Architectural style: Greek Revival
- MPS: National Road in Pennsylvania MPS
- NRHP reference No.: 95001352
- Added to NRHP: November 27, 1995

Abel Colley Tavern is a historic home that also served as an inn and tavern located at Menallen Township, Fayette County, Pennsylvania. It was built about 1835, and is a 2 1/2-story, 5-bay, brick dwelling with a 2 1/2-story rear kitchen ell. It sits on a sandstone foundation and is in the Greek Revival style. It was built as a stop for 19th-century travelers on the National Road.

It was added to the National Register of Historic Places in 1995.
