= Smock, Pennsylvania =

Unincorporated community in Pennsylvania, US

- Census-designated place
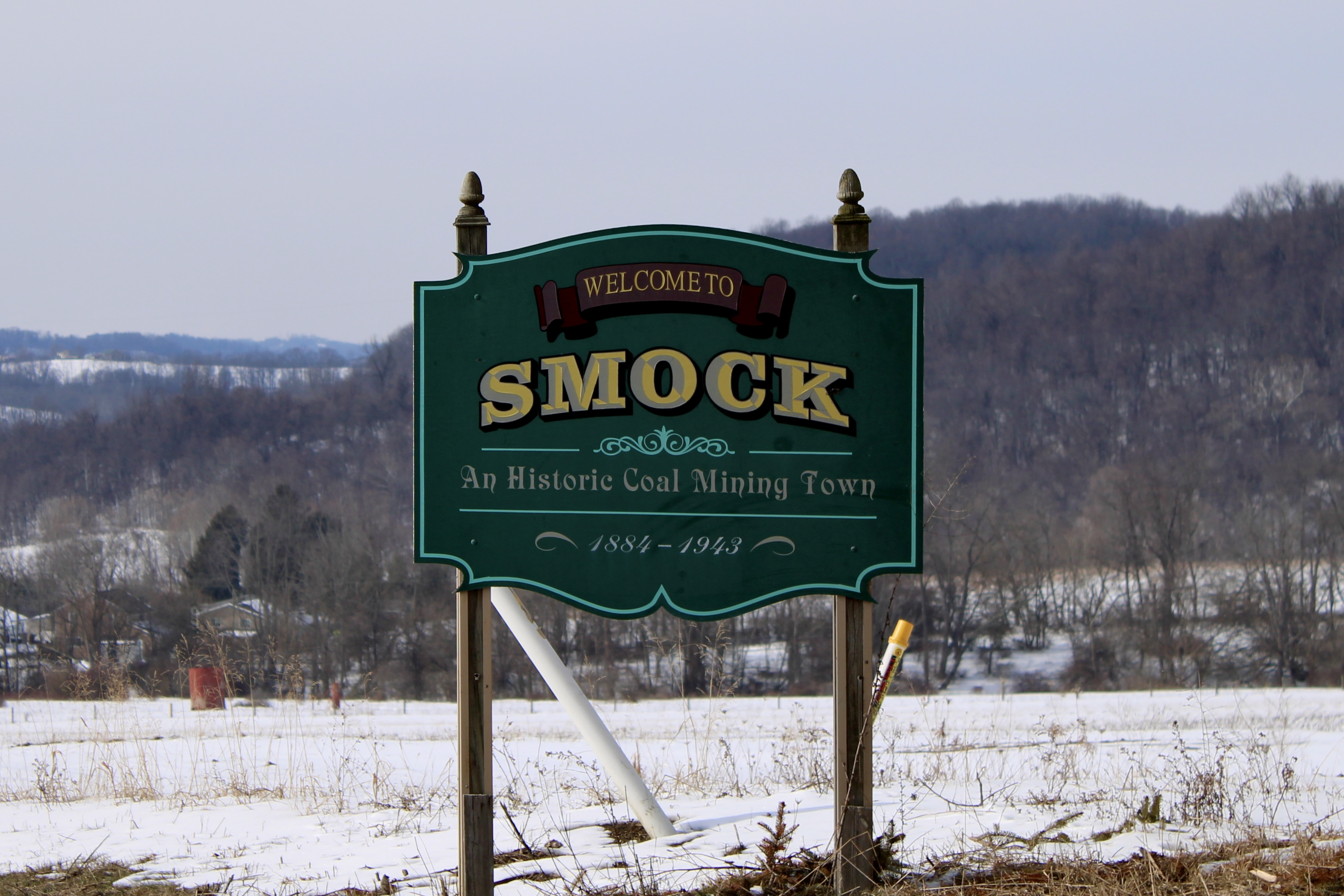

- Location within Pennsylvania Location within the United States
- Coordinates: 39°59′59″N 79°46′39″W
- Country: United States
- State: Pennsylvania
- County: Fayette
- Townships: Franklin, Menallen

Area
  - Total: 1.5 sq mi (4.0 km^{2})
  - Land: 1.5 sq mi (4.0 km^{2})
  - Water: 0 sq mi (0.0 km^{2})
- Elevation: 1,004 ft (306 m)

Population (2010)
  - Total: 583
  - Density: 373/sq mi (144.1/km^{2})
- Time zone: UTC-5 (Eastern (EST))
  - Summer (DST): UTC-4 (EDT)
- ZIP code: 15480
- FIPS code: 42-71456
- GNIS feature ID: 2631305

Smock is an unincorporated community and census-designated place that is located in Franklin and Menallen townships in Fayette County, Pennsylvania, United States. Situated roughly halfway between the borough of Perryopolis and the city of Uniontown, it is part of the Pittsburgh metropolitan area.

As of the 2010 census, the population was 583.

== History ==
The community was named after Samuel Smock, the original owner of the town site.

== Geography ==
The community is located along Redstone Creek, which forms the boundary between Franklin and Menallen townships. Pennsylvania Route 51, a four-lane highway, forms the eastern edge of the CDP. Route 51 leads north 7 miles (11 km) to Perryopolis and south 8 miles (13 km) to Uniontown, the county seat.

According to the U.S. Census Bureau, the Smock CDP has a total area of 1.5 square miles (4.0 km^{2}), all land.

== Notable person ==
- James Warhola, artist
