= Robert J. Cenker =

American astronaut and engineer (born 1948)

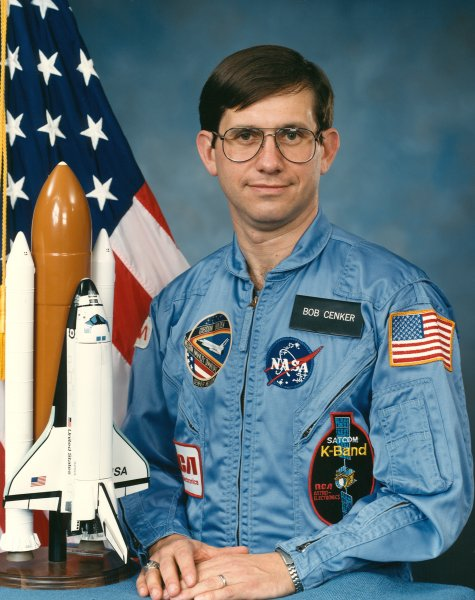
- Born: Robert Joseph Cenker; November 5, 1948 (age 77); Menallen Township, Pennsylvania, U.S.
- Education: Penn State, B.S. 1970, M.S. 1973; Rutgers, M.S. 1977
- Occupation: Engineer
- Space career

RCA Astro-Electronics Payload Specialist
- Status: Retired
- Time in space: 6d 02h 03m
- Mission: STS-61-C
- Retired: January 18, 1986

Robert Joseph Cenker (born November 5, 1948) is an American aerospace and electrical engineer, aerospace systems consultant, and former astronaut. Cenker worked for 18 years at RCA Astro-Electronics, and its successor company GE Astro Space, on a variety of spacecraft projects. He spent most of his career working on commercial communications satellites, including the Satcom, Spacenet and GStar programs.

In January 1986, Cenker was a crew member on the twenty-fourth mission of NASA's Space Shuttle program, the seventh flight of Space Shuttle Columbia, designated as mission STS-61-C. Cenker served as a Payload Specialist, (Note: There was another Space Shuttle astronaut category sometimes confused with that of Payload Specialist: While Payload Specialists were non-NASA personnel selected for a single specific mission, Mission Specialists were selected as astronauts first, and then subsequently assigned to flights as mission needs dictated.) representing RCA Astro-Electronics. This mission was the final flight before the Challenger disaster, which caused the Space Shuttle program to be suspended until 1988, and impacted NASA's Payload Specialist program for even longer. As a result, Cenker's mission was called "The End of Innocence" for the Shuttle program. Following the completion of his Shuttle mission, Cenker returned to work in the commercial aerospace field. Since his flight, he has made numerous public appearances representing NASA and the Shuttle program, in the United States, as well as internationally.

== Early life and education ==
Cenker was born on November 5, 1948, and raised in Menallen Township, Pennsylvania. He started his education at St. Fidelis College Seminary in Herman, Pennsylvania, leaving in 1962. In 1970 Cenker enrolled at Penn State University where he earned a Bachelor of Science degree in aerospace engineering. He continued his studies at Penn State and earned a Master of Science degree in 1973, also in aerospace engineering. Cenker earned a second Master of Science degree in electrical engineering from Rutgers University in 1977.

== Pre-spaceflight career ==
Cenker worked for 18 years at RCA Astro-Electronics and its successor company GE Astro Space. Cenker worked on hardware design and systems design concerning satellite attitude control. He also worked on in-orbit operations, as well as spacecraft assembly, test, and pre-launch operations. He spent two years on the Navy navigation satellite program, but spent most of his career working on commercial communications satellites.

Cenker's positions included integration and test manager for the Satcom D and E spacecraft, where he was responsible for all launch site activities. He also served as spacecraft bus manager on the Spacenet/GStar programs. He was responsible for ensuring the spacecraft could interface with multiple rockets, including the Delta, Space Shuttle, and Ariane launch vehicles.

== Spaceflight experience ==
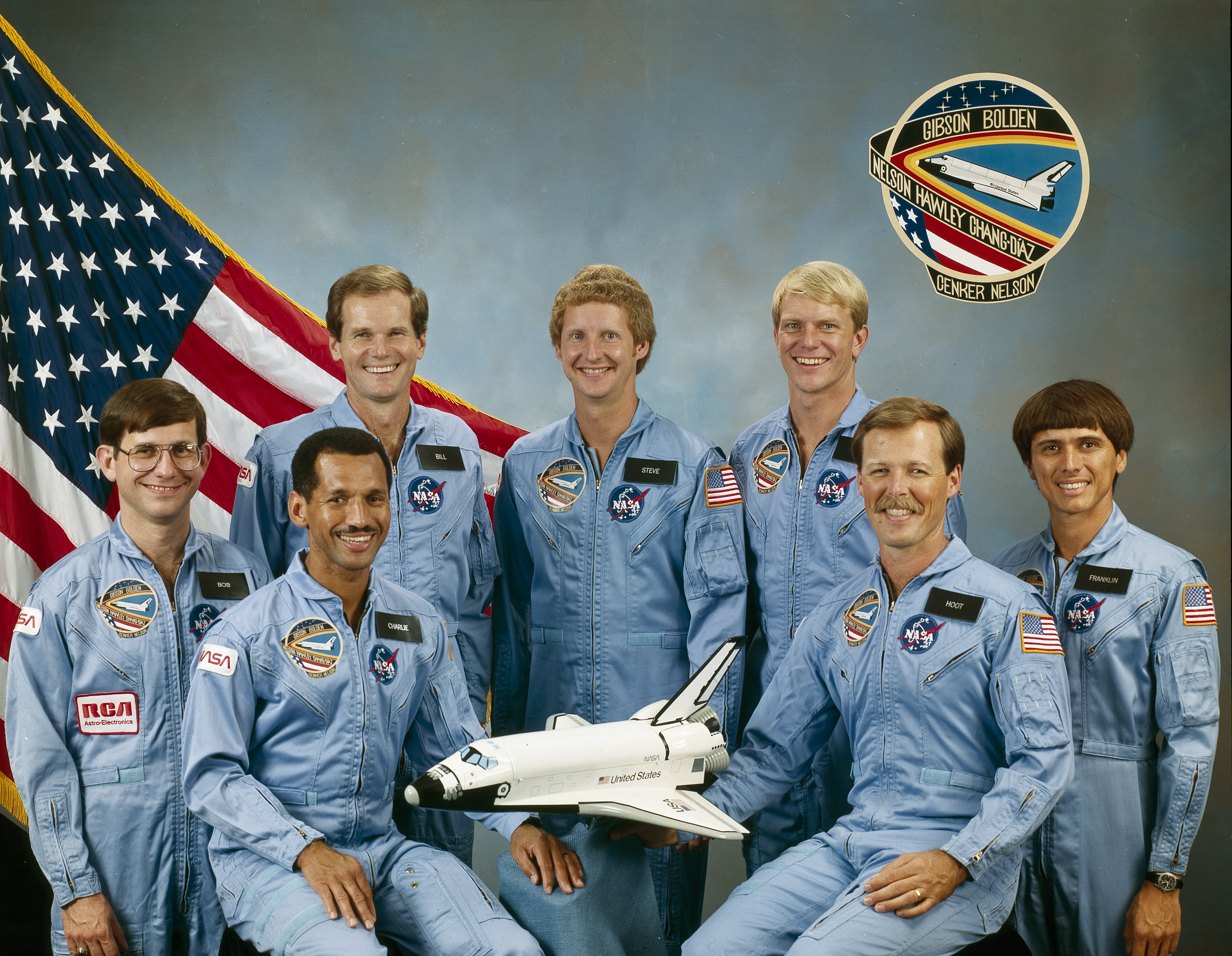
STS-61-C crew

As an incentive for a spacecraft owner to contract with NASA to use a Shuttle launch instead of an unmanned, commercial launch system, NASA permitted contracting companies to apply for a payload specialist seat on the same mission. When RCA contracted with NASA to launch Satcom Ku-1, RCA Astro-Electronics' manager of systems engineering for the Satcom-K program Bob Cenker, and his co-worker Gerard Magilton, were selected to train as payload specialists so that one of the pair could accompany Satcom Ku-1 into space. Cenker and Magilton trained with career astronauts as well as other payload and mission specialists, including those scheduled for the next scheduled flight, that of the Challenger mission, STS-51-L.

This flight of Columbia was originally scheduled to occur in August 1985, but the timeline slipped. In July 1985 the payload was finalized to include the RCA satellite, and Cenker was assigned to the mission, now designated as STS-61-C. Magilton was assigned as the back-up.

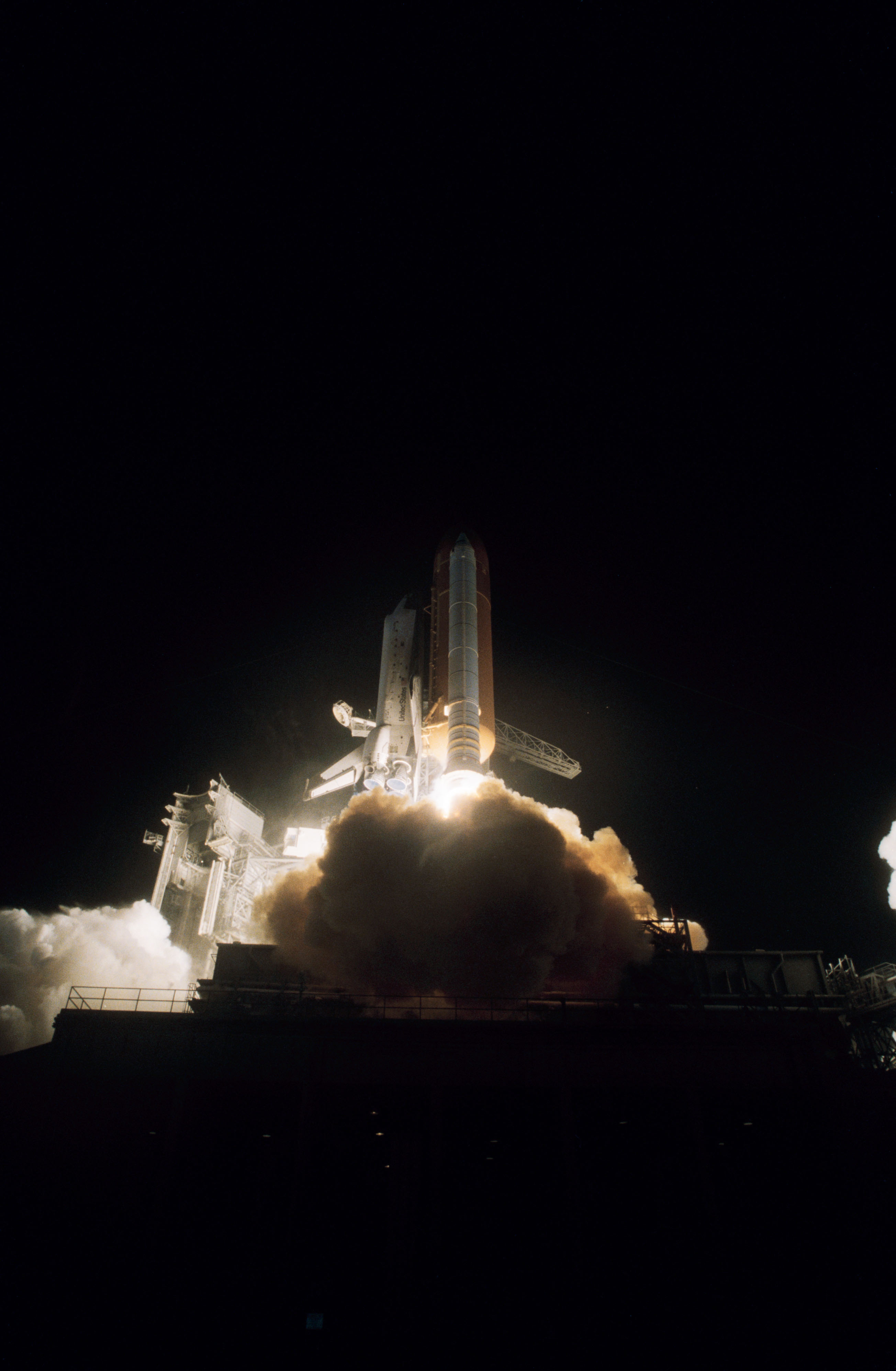
STS-61-C launch

Prior to its successful launch, Columbia had several aborted launch attempts, including one on January 6 which was "one of the most hazardous in the Shuttle’s operational history" to that point. As documented in Crewmember Bill Nelson's book "Mission: An American Congressman's Voyage to Space", and as reported in Spaceflight Insider, "The launch attempt on Jan. 6, 1986 was halted at T-31 seconds. The weather was perfect for the scheduled launch at dawn, but a failure of a liquid oxygen drain valve prevented it to close properly. The valve was then closed manually, but not quickly enough to prevent a low temperature in one fuel line." However, Nelson says that what really happened was that "the valve did not close because it was not commanded to close", and that it was later determined that the Rogers Commission, investigating the series of mistakes that forced this second scrub, recognized that the problems were personnel-related, caused by fatigue from overwork: One potentially catastrophic human error occurred 4 minutes 55 seconds before the scheduled launch of mission 61-C on January 6, 1986. According to a Lockheed Space Operations Company incident report, 18,000 pounds of liquid oxygen were inadvertently drained from the Shuttle external fuel tank due to operator error. Fortunately, the liquid oxygen flow dropped the main engine inlet temperature below the acceptable limit causing a launch hold, but only 31 seconds before lift-off. As the report states, "Had the mission not been scrubbed, the ability of the orbiter to reach a defined orbit may have been significantly impacted.

There was another near-catastrophic launch abort three days later. Referring to the January 9 abort, pilot Charlie Bolden later stated that it "...would have been catastrophic, because the engine would have exploded had we launched. In all, it took a record eight attempts to get Columbia off the ground. Columbia finally launched and achieved orbit on January 12, 1986, with a full crew of seven. Along with Cenker, the crew included Robert L. "Hoot" Gibson, future NASA Administrator Charles F. Bolden, George D. Nelson, Steven A. Hawley, Franklin R. Chang-Diaz, and US Representative Bill Nelson. Cenker and his crewmates traveled over 2.5 million miles in 98 orbits aboard Columbia and logged over 146 hours in space.

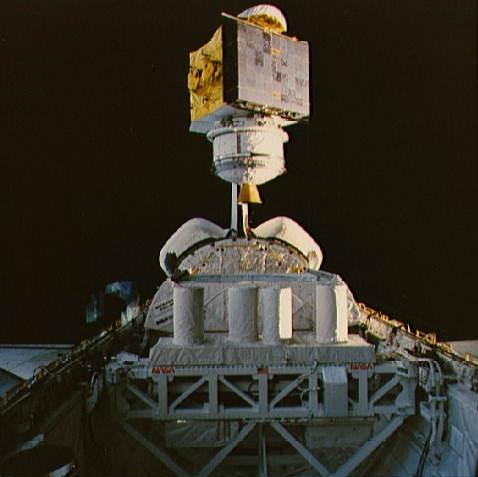
RCA SATCOM Ku-1 deployment

During the six-day mission, January 12–18, Cenker performed a variety of physiological tests, operated a primary experiment – an infrared imaging camera – and assisted with the deployment of RCA Americom's Satcom Ku-1 satellite, the primary mission objective. Satcom Ku-1 was deployed nearly 10 hours into the mission, and Satcom later reached its designated geostationary orbital position at 85 degrees West longitude where it remained operational until April 1997, the last major commercial satellite deployed by the Space Shuttle program. In a 2014 video of the "Tell Me a Story" series titled "Close My Eyes & Drift Away", posted to the Kennedy Space Center Visitor Complex YouTube channel, Cenker tells a humorous story regarding a zero-g sleeping problem he faced on his mission.

The next Shuttle launch, ten days after the return of Columbia, resulted in the destruction of the Challenger with the loss of all aboard, including Cenker's counterpart from Hughes Aircraft, civilian crew member and Payload Specialist Greg Jarvis. Accordingly, commander Gibson later called the STS-61-C mission "The End of Innocence" for the Shuttle program.

Following the Challenger disaster, the Shuttle fleet was grounded until 1988. Even after Shuttle missions resumed, civilian payload specialists like Cenker were excluded until the payload specialist program was reinstated on December 2, 1990, when Samuel T. Durrance, an Applied Physics Laboratory astrophysicist and Ronald A. Parise, a Computer Sciences Corporation astronomer, flew aboard STS-35. By that time, RCA had been purchased by General Electric, and RCA Astro-Electronics became part of GE. Following two additional ownership transitions, the facility was closed in 1998. As a result, Cenker was the only RCA Astro-Electronics employee, and only employee in the history of the facility under all of its subsequent names, to ever fly in space.

NASA's Payload Specialist program has been criticized for giving limited Shuttle flight positions to civilian aerospace engineers such as Cenker and Greg Jarvis (killed aboard Challenger), politicians such as Bill Nelson, and other civilians such as Teacher in Space Christa McAuliffe (also killed aboard Challenger). Even the flight of former Mercury astronaut and US Senator John Glenn was questioned. The concern was that these people had replaced career astronauts in very limited flight opportunities, and some may have flown without fully understanding the level of danger involved in a Shuttle mission. (Note: A 1986 post-Challenger article in The Washington Post reviewed the issue, reporting that as far back as 1982, NASA was concerned with finding reasonable justifications for flying civilians on the Shuttle as was directed by the Reagan administration. The Post article says that "A review of records and interviews with past and present NASA and government officials shows the civilian program's controversial background, with different groups pushing for different approaches." The article continues: "Author Tom Wolfe, who chronicled the early days of the space program in The Right Stuff, wrote after the Challenger explosion that support for the citizen program, and therefore McAuliffe's place aboard the shuttle, was part of an insiders' battle. NASA civilians, pitting themselves against the professional astronauts, used the program for the 'dismantling of Astropower,' which Wolfe described as 'the political grip the original breed of fighter-pilot test-pilot astronauts had on NASA.' ")

== Post-spaceflight ==
Following the completion of his Shuttle mission, Cenker returned to work in the civilian aerospace field. Cenker's last two years with RCA Astro-Electronics and its successor GE Astro Space were spent as Manager of Payload Accommodations on an EOS spacecraft program. After leaving GE, Cenker served as a consultant for various aerospace companies regarding micro-gravity research, and spacecraft design, assembly and flight operations. Cenker supported systems engineering and systems architecture studies for various spacecraft projects, including smallsats, military communications satellites, and large, assembled-in-orbit platforms. His contributions included launch vehicle evaluation and systems engineering support for Motorola on Iridium, and launch readiness for the Globalstar constellation. Other efforts include systems engineering and operations support for Intelsat on Intelsat K and Intelsat VIII, for AT&T on Telstar 401 and 402, for Fairchild-Matra on SPAS III, for Martin Marietta on Astra 1B, BS-3N, ACTS, and for the Lockheed Martin Series 7000 communications satellites.

In 2017, Cenker's STS-61C crewmate former US Senator Bill Nelson spoke at a session of the US House of Representatives. In an address, titled "Mission to Mars and Space Shuttle Flight 30th Anniversary", he read into the Congressional Record the details of the mission of STS-61C, as well as the names and function of each crew member including Cenker.

In June 2017, Cenker traveled to Scotland where he and astronaut Doug Wheelock gave a series of talks to children in Fife schools as part of the Scottish Space School.

Cenker continues to make periodic public appearances representing NASA and the astronaut program, including at the Kennedy Space Center Visitor Complex in March 2017, January 2023, and April 2024.

=== Apollo 11 commemoration activities ===
Leading up to the 50th anniversary of the Apollo 11 mission, Cenker participated in several public events with other former NASA astronauts.

During an interview to discuss his scheduled appearance at The New Jersey Governor's School of Engineering & Technology at Rutgers University in July 2019, Cenker talked about his education at Rutgers, his work at RCA, his shuttle mission, his connection to the Challenger crew, his thoughts on the importance of the Apollo 11 mission, and of space travel in general. He concluded:

I want students interested in a space career to find something that they love to study, and there may come a time when NASA needs that expertise. I love engineering and even if I didn’t make it into space, I would still be doing what I loved. You can’t push yourself to study something you don’t love and do it as well as someone who does. What I want students to ask themselves is “how can I do what I love and how can that benefit spaceflight?”

The Cradle of Aviation in Garden City, New York invited Cenker to participate in its "Moon Fest" planned for July 20, 2019, exactly fifty years after the Apollo 11 landing. It was announced that Cenker would join two fellow shuttle astronauts from New York, Bill Shepherd and Charlie Camarda, at the celebration.

== Personal life and beliefs ==
Bob Cenker is married to Barbara Ann Cenker; they have two sons and a daughter.

In a July 2019 interview discussing the 50th anniversary of Apollo 11, Cenker commented that he believes that humans have an innate desire to explore, saying "It’s not learned... It’s in your genes". Discussing his religious beliefs, Cenker said "I'm a good, practicing Catholic. One of the guys I flew with was an agnostic. I think going into space reinforces what you believe when you went... [The agnostic astronaut] couldn’t grasp how one being could create all this. I came back thinking ‘God, you have to be there’".

== Professional societies ==
- Associate Fellow in the American Institute of Aeronautics and Astronautics (AIAA)
- Life Member of the Penn State Alumni Association
- Life Member of the Association of Space Explorers
- Registered Professional Engineer in the state of New Jersey
- Senior Member of the Institute of Electrical and Electronics Engineers (IEEE)
- Sigma Gamma Tau
- Tau Beta Pi

== See also ==
- 1986 in spaceflight
- List of human spaceflights
- List of Space Shuttle missions
- List of Space Shuttle crews
- List of Shuttle payload specialists

== Photo gallery ==
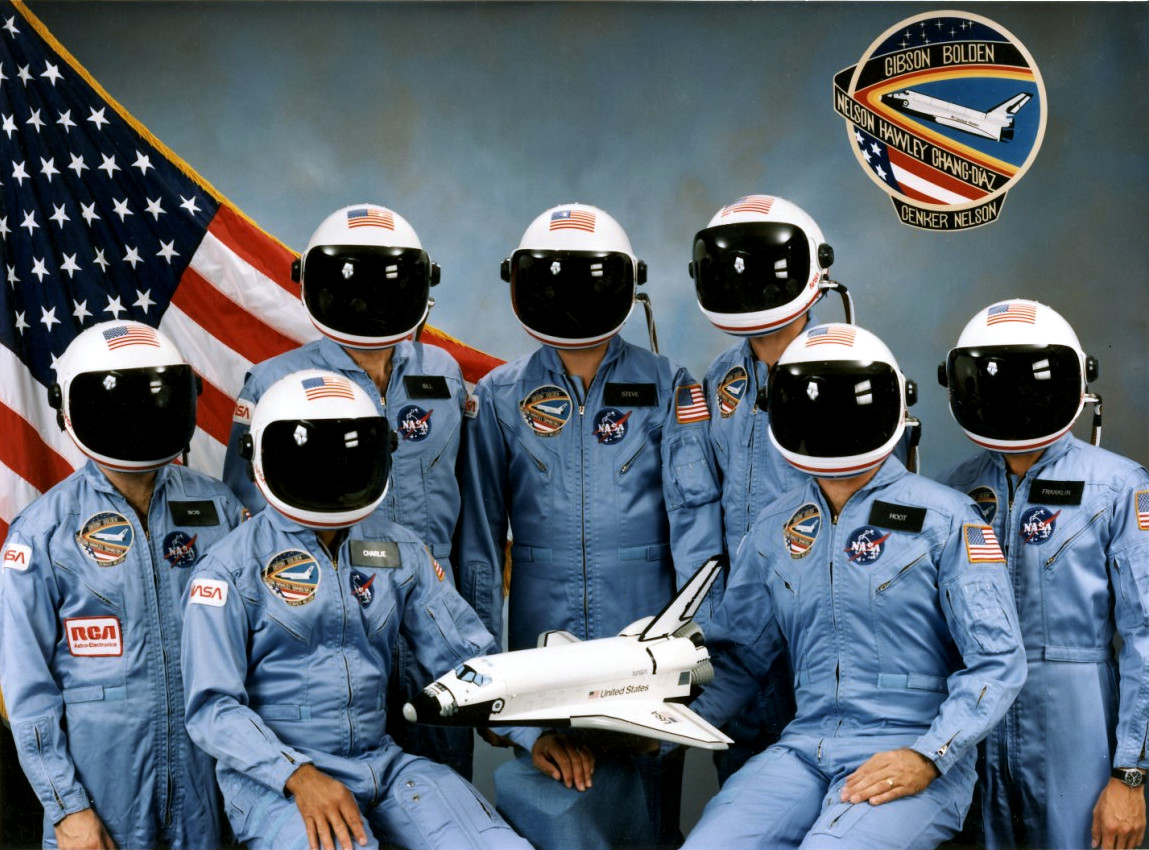
Gag crew photo

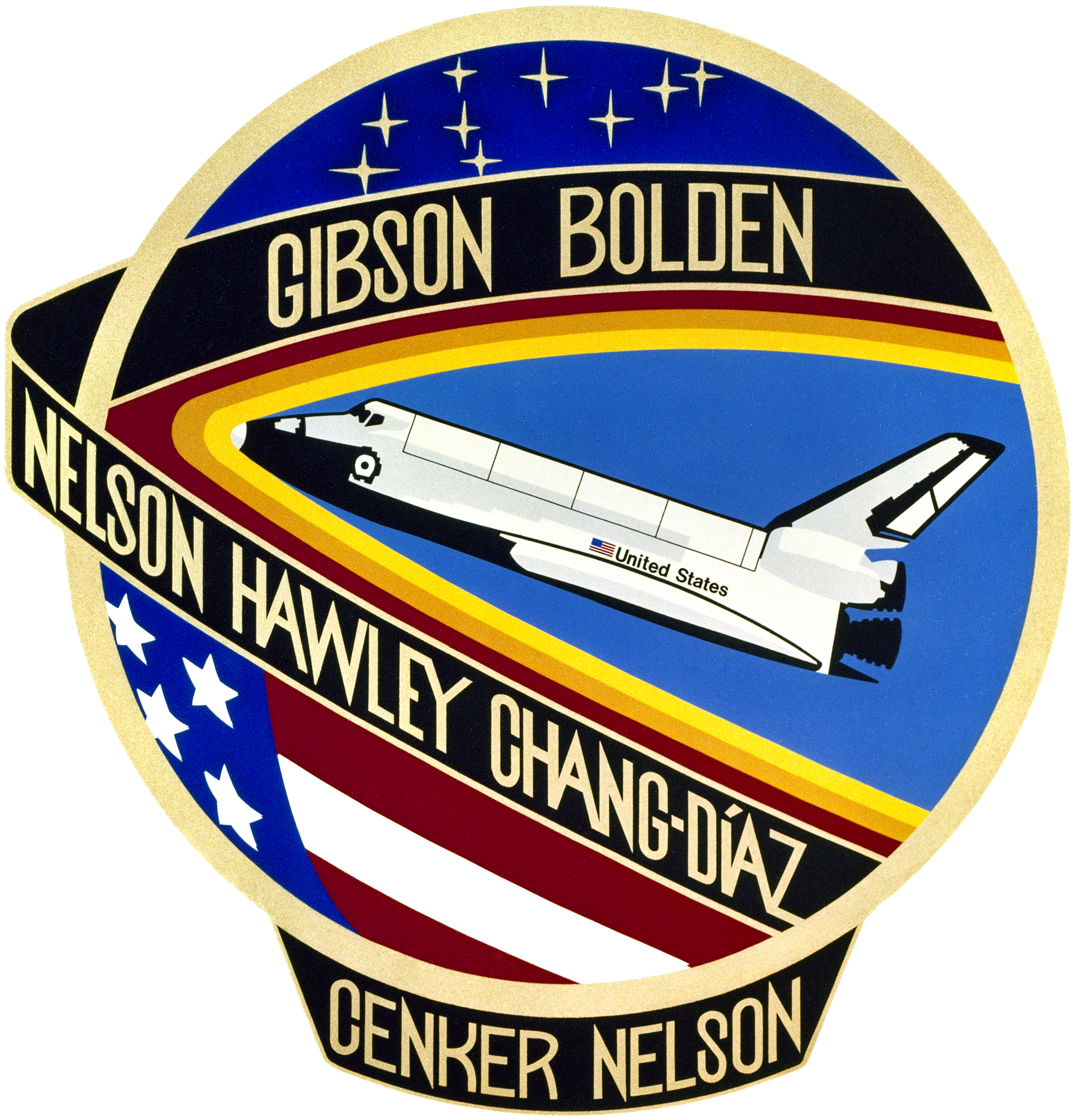
STS-61-C insignia
