= Josiah Frost House =

Historic house in Pennsylvania, United States

- U.S. National Register of Historic Places
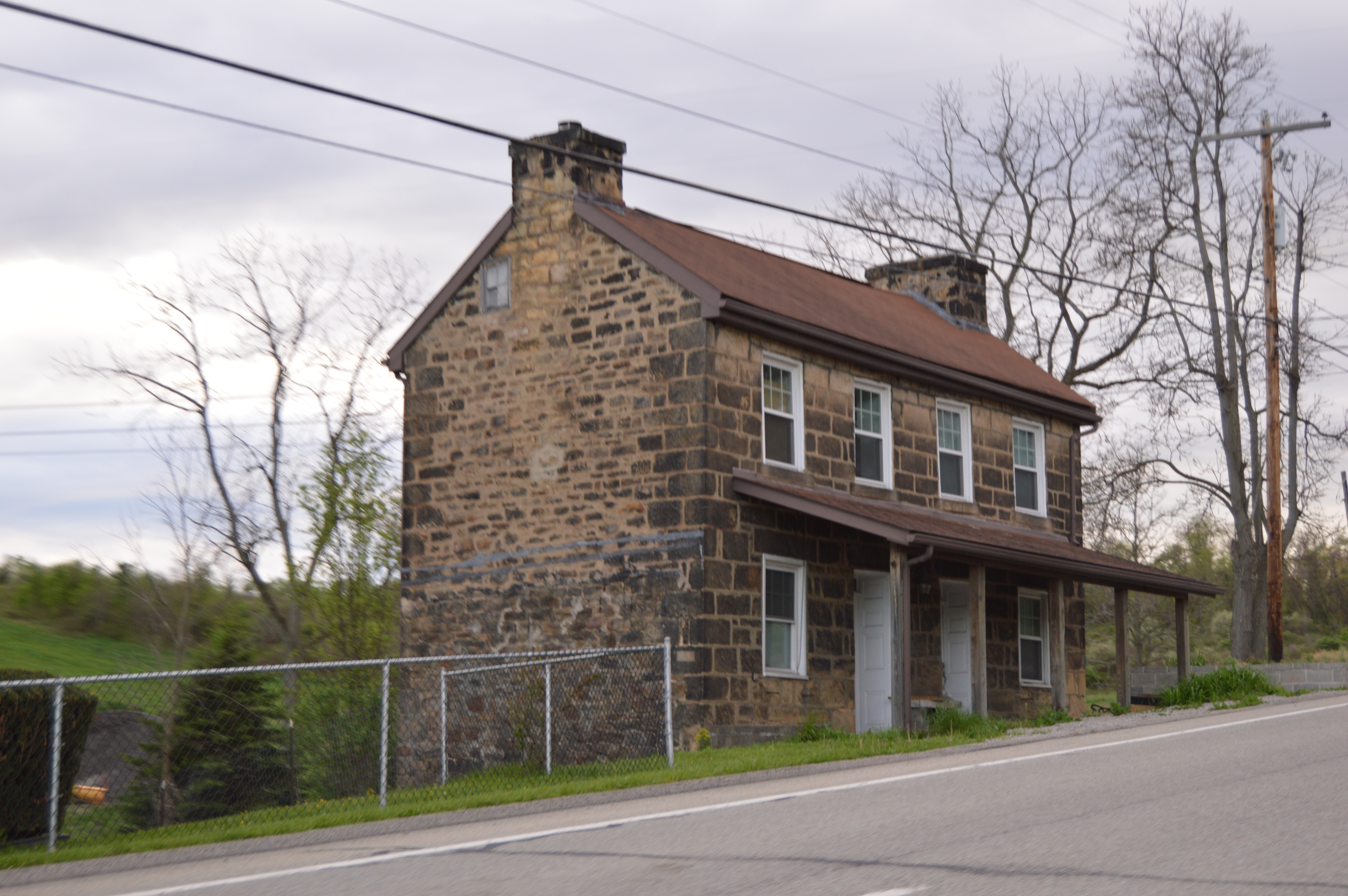

- Location within Pennsylvania Location within the United States
- Location: Southern side of U.S. Route 40, west of Searight's Corners, Menallen Township, Pennsylvania
- Coordinates: 39°57′18″N 79°48′21″W
- Area: less than one acre
- Architectural style: Federal
- MPS: National Road in Pennsylvania MPS
- NRHP reference No.: 96001209
- Added to NRHP: October 24, 1996

The Josiah Frost House is an historic home that is located in Menallen Township, Fayette County, Pennsylvania, United States.

It was added to the National Register of Historic Places in 1996.

== History and architectural features ==
Built roughly between 1816 and 1819, this historic structure is a two-story, rectangular, sandstone dwelling that measures forty-eight feet by twenty-four feet. It was designed in a vernacular, Federal style, and was built as part of the Searight Tavern complex at Searight's Corners, an important stop for nineteenth-century travelers on the National Road.

The house pictured opposite the site of the demolished Frost house, also known as the Searight House. The Frost house was on the north side of Route 40.
