= Franklin Township, Fayette County, Pennsylvania =

Township in Pennsylvania, US

Coordinates: 39°59′00″N 79°42′59″W

Franklin Township
- Township
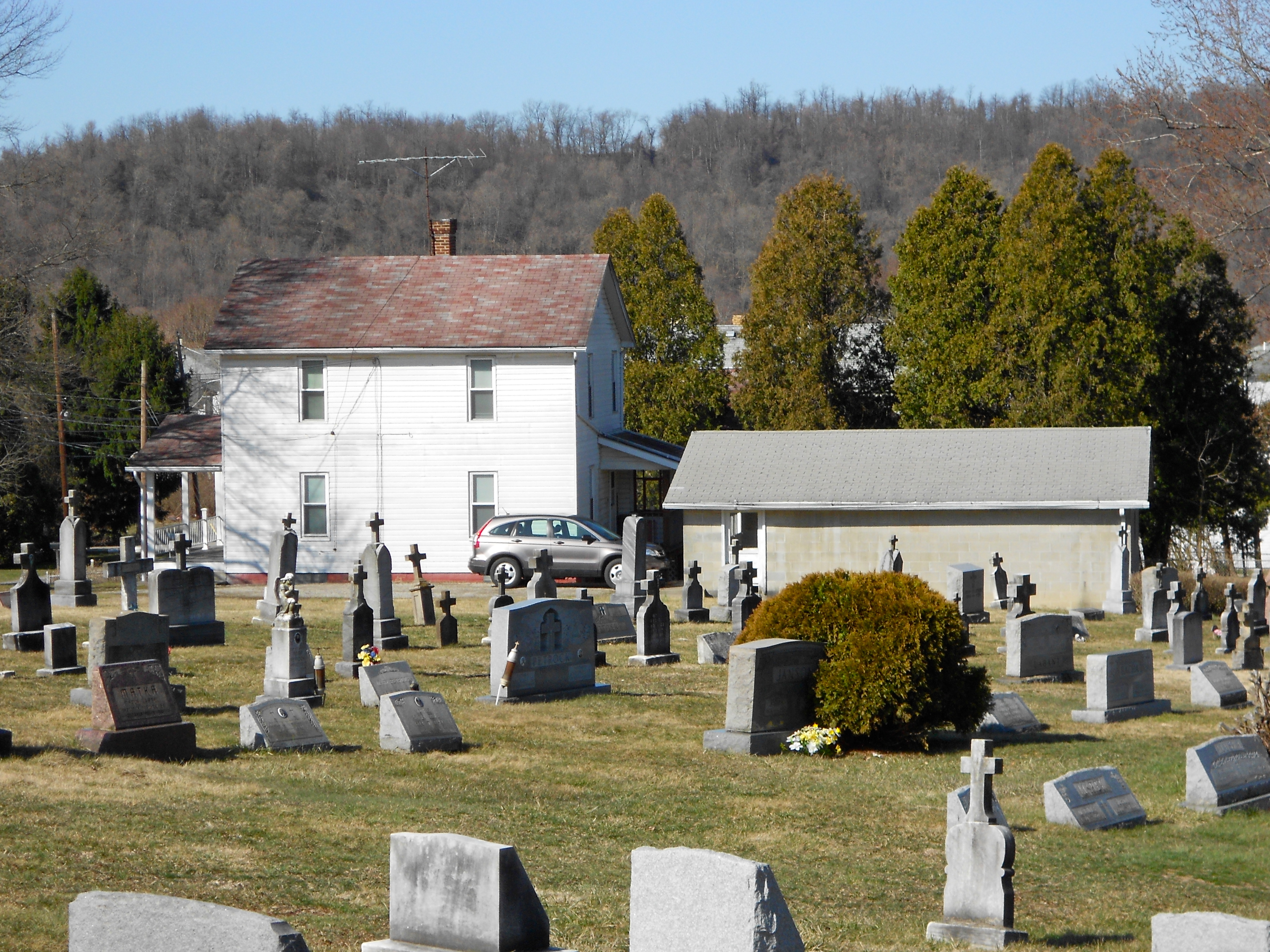
- Houses in the Smock Historic District

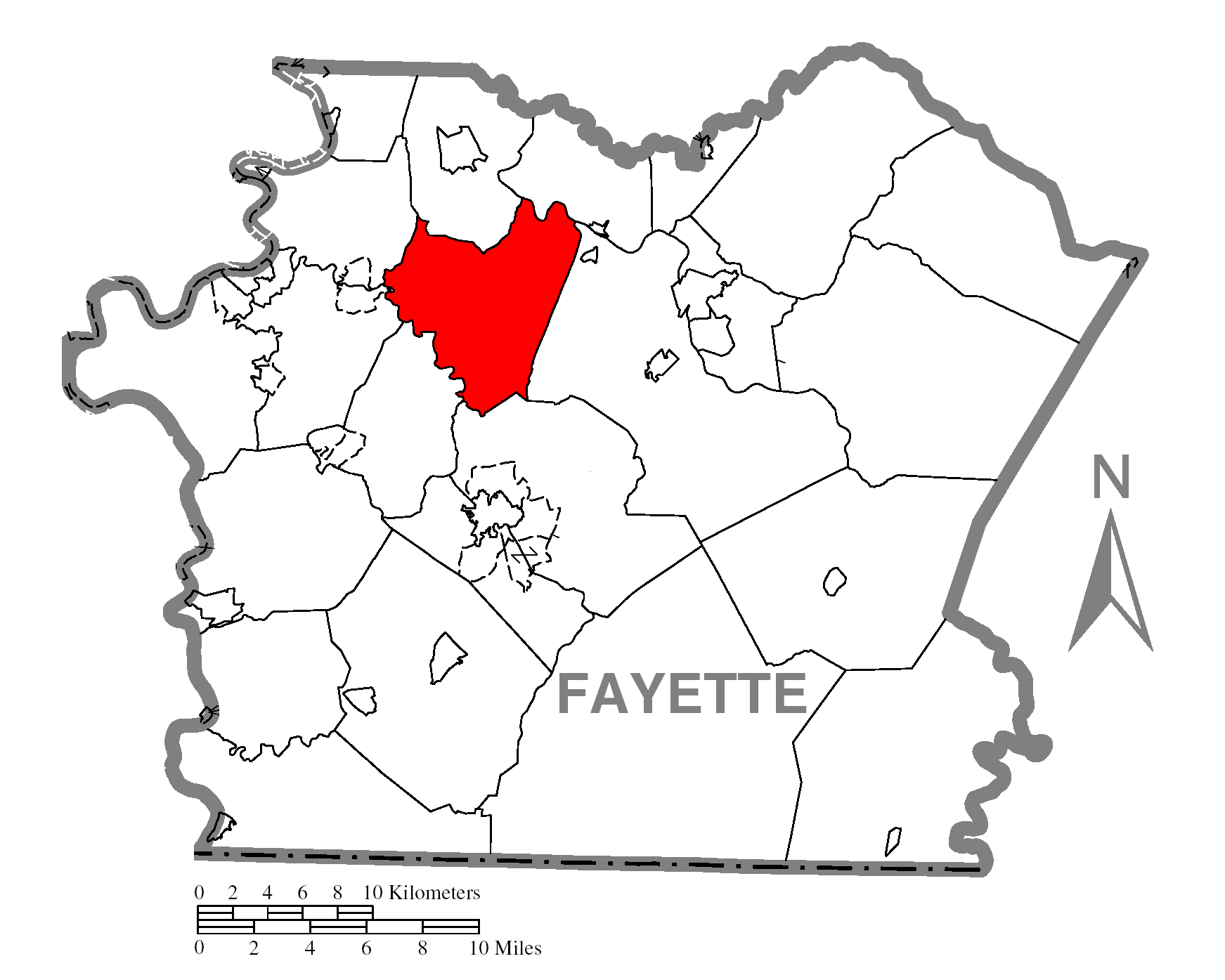
- Location of Franklin Township in Fayette County

- Location of Fayette County in Pennsylvania
- Country: United States
- State: Pennsylvania
- County: Fayette

Area
  - Total: 29.75 sq mi (77.05 km^{2})
  - Land: 29.60 sq mi (76.66 km^{2})
  - Water: 0.15 sq mi (0.39 km^{2})

Population (2020)
  - Total: 2,380 ▼
  - Estimate (2022): 2,331
  - Density: 83/sq mi (32/km^{2})
- Time zone: UTC-4 (EST)
  - Summer (DST): UTC-5 (EDT)
- Area code: 724
- FIPS code: 42-051-27400
- Website: https://www.franklinfayette.com/

Franklin Township is a township in Fayette County, Pennsylvania, United States. The population was 2,380 at the 2020 census, a decline from the figure of 2,528 tabulated in 2010. The township is served by the Uniontown Area School District.

Unincorporated communities within the township include Smock, Bitner, Buena Vista, Flatwoods, and Laurel Hill.

== History ==
The Smock Historic District was listed on the National Register of Historic Places in 1994.

== Geography ==
Franklin Township is in northwestern Fayette County. It is bordered to the southwest by Redstone Creek, a tributary of the Monongahela River. The township extends northeast to the Youghiogheny River, another tributary of the Monongahela. Smock, the most populous settlement, is in the western part of the township along Redstone Creek.

According to the United States Census Bureau, the township has a total area of 29.75 square miles (77.05 km^{2}), of which 29.60 square miles (76.66 km^{2}) is land and 0.15 square miles (0.39 km^{2}), or 0.50%, is water.

Pennsylvania Route 51 crosses the township, leading north to Perryopolis and south to Uniontown, the Fayette County seat.

== Demographics ==
Historical population
| Census | Pop. | Note | %± |
|---|---|---|---|
| 2010 | 2,528 | | — |
| 2020 | 2,380 | | −5.9% |
| 2022 (est.) | 2,331 | | −2.1% |
U.S. Decennial Census

As of the 2000 census, there were 2,628 people, 1,012 households, and 760 families residing in the township. The population density was 88.7 inhabitants per square mile (34.2/km^{2}). There were 1,072 housing units at an average density of 36.2 per square mile (14.0/km^{2}). The racial makeup of the township was 98.25% White, 0.88% African American, 0.15% Native American, 0.04% Asian, 0.27% from other races, and 0.42% from two or more races. Hispanic or Latino of any race were 0.11% of the population.

There were 1,012 households, out of which 30.1% had children under the age of 18 living with them, 61.6% were married couples living together, 9.3% had a female householder with no husband present, and 24.9% were non-families. 22.4% of all households were made up of individuals, and 11.8% had someone living alone who was 65 years of age or older. The average household size was 2.57 and the average family size was 2.98.

In the township the population was spread out, with 22.4% under the age of 18, 7.8% from 18 to 24, 27.7% from 25 to 44, 25.2% from 45 to 64, and 16.9% who were 65 years of age or older. The median age was 41 years. For every 100 females there were 97.7 males. For every 100 females age 18 and over, there were 95.1 males.

The median income for a household in the township was $32,348, and the median income for a family was $38,424. Males had a median income of $32,135 versus $20,707 for females. The per capita income for the township was $15,167. About 9.7% of families and 13.8% of the population were below the poverty line, including 19.5% of those under age 18 and 8.9% of those age 65 or over.
