= Smock Historic District =

Historic district in Pennsylvania, United States

- U.S. National Register of Historic Places
- U.S. Historic district
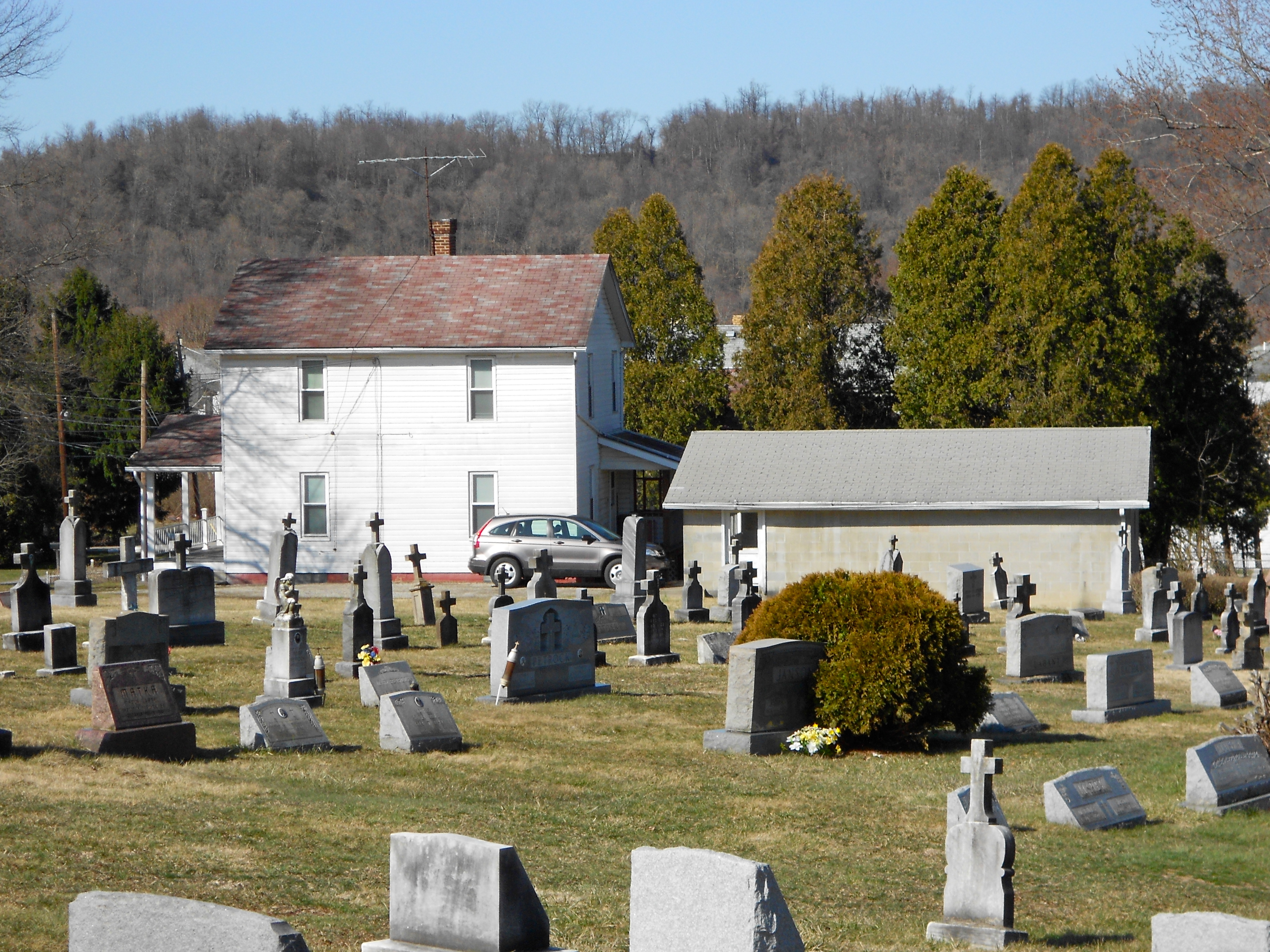

- Location within Pennsylvania Location within the United States
- Location: Roughly bounded by Redstone Cemetery, Colonial Mine No. 1, Smock Hill, Colonial Mine No. 2 and Redstone Cr., Franklin Township and Menallen Township, Pennsylvania
- Coordinates: 39°59′59″N 79°46′39″W
- Area: 187 acres (76 ha)
- Built: 1911
- Built by: Pittsburg Coal Co. et al
- MPS: Bituminous Coal and Coke Resources of Pennsylvania MPS
- NRHP reference No.: 94000520
- Added to NRHP: June 3, 1994

The Smock Historic District is a national historic district that is located in Franklin Township and Menallen Township, Fayette County, Pennsylvania.

It was added to the National Register of Historic Places in 1994.

== History and architectural features ==
This district includes 177 contributing buildings, four contributing sites, seven contributing structures, and one contributing object that are located in the coal mining community of Smock. Most of the contributing buildings and structures were built between the 1880s and 1923. They include the extractive and archaeological remains of Colonial Mines No. 1 and 2 and related coke operations, 109 company built dwellings (92 workers' houses and 17 managers' houses), the Redstone Creek bridge, and the Smock War Monument. Other buildings are three schools, the company store, three churches, and a movie theater.
