= Buffington, Pennsylvania =

Unincorporated community in Pennsylvania, US

- Census-designated place
- Location within Pennsylvania Location within the United States
- Coordinates: 39°55′44″N 79°50′31″W
- Country: United States
- State: Pennsylvania
- County: Fayette
- Township: Menallen

Area
  - Total: 0.16 sq mi (0.42 km^{2})
  - Land: 0.16 sq mi (0.42 km^{2})
  - Water: 0 sq mi (0.00 km^{2})
- Elevation: 1,000 ft (300 m)

Population (2020)
  - Total: 298
  - Density: 1,840/sq mi (712/km^{2})
- Time zone: UTC-5 (Eastern (EST))
  - Summer (DST): UTC-4 (EDT)
- FIPS code: 42-10096
- GNIS feature ID: 1170627

Buffington is an unincorporated community and census-designated place in Menallen Township, Fayette County, Pennsylvania, United States. The community was part of the New Salem-Buffington CDP, before it was split into two separate CDPs for the 2010 census. The population was 292 as of the 2010 census.

== Demographics ==
Historical population
Census	Pop.	Note	%±
2020	298		—
U.S. Decennial Census
