= STS-61-C =

1986 American crewed spaceflight to deploy Satcom-K1

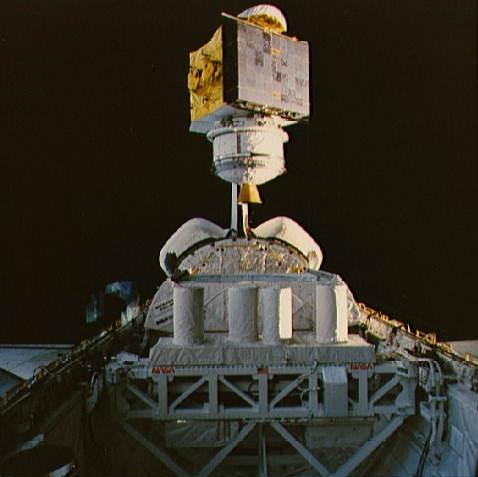
- Satcom-K1 is deployed from Columbia's payload bay.
- Names: Space Transportation System-24
- Mission type: Satellite deployment Microgravity research
- Operator: NASA
- COSPAR ID: 1986-003A
- SATCAT no.: 16481
- Mission duration: 6 days, 2 hours, 3 minutes, 51 seconds
- Distance travelled: 4,069,481 km (2,528,658 mi)
- Orbits completed: 98

Spacecraft properties
- Spacecraft: Space Shuttle Columbia
- Launch mass: 116,121 kg (256,003 lb)
- Landing mass: 95,325 kg (210,156 lb)
- Payload mass: 14,724 kg (32,461 lb)

Crew
- Crew size: 7
- Members: Robert L. Gibson; Charles Bolden; George Nelson; Steven Hawley; Franklin Chang-Díaz; Bill Nelson; Robert J. Cenker

Start of mission
- Launch date: January 12, 1986, 11:55:00 UTC (6:55 am EST)
- Launch site: Kennedy, LC-39A
- Contractor: Rockwell International

End of mission
- Landing date: January 18, 1986, 13:58:51 UTC (5:58:51 am PST)
- Landing site: Edwards, Runway 22

Orbital parameters
- Reference system: Geocentric orbit
- Regime: Low Earth orbit
- Perigee altitude: 331 km (206 mi)
- Apogee altitude: 338 km (210 mi)
- Inclination: 28.45°
- Period: 91.20 minutes

Instruments
- Comet Halley Active Monitoring Program (CHAMP); Getaway Special (GAS) canisters; Shuttle Infrared Leeside Temperature Sensing (SILTS); Shuttle Student Involvement Program (SSIP)
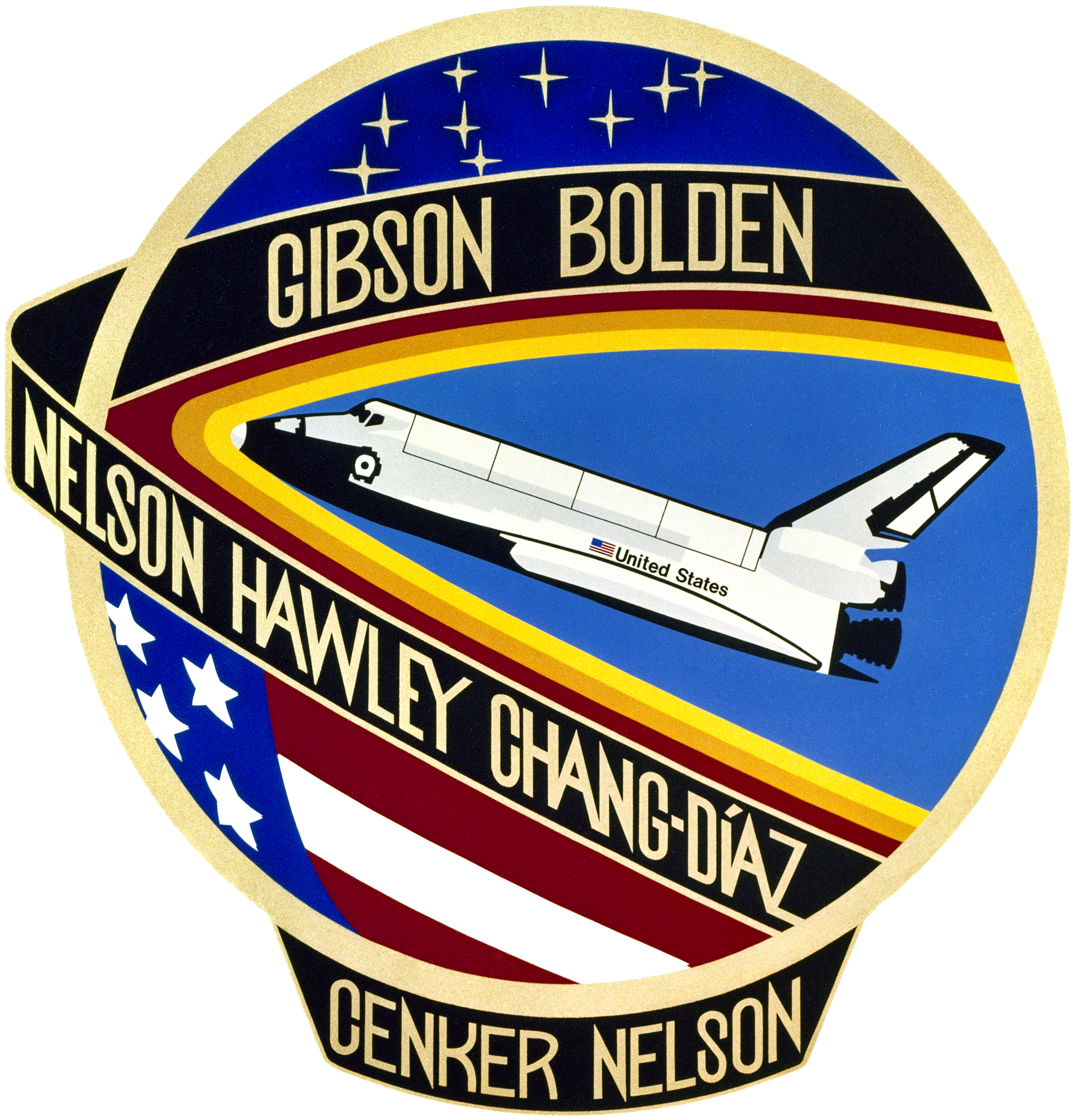
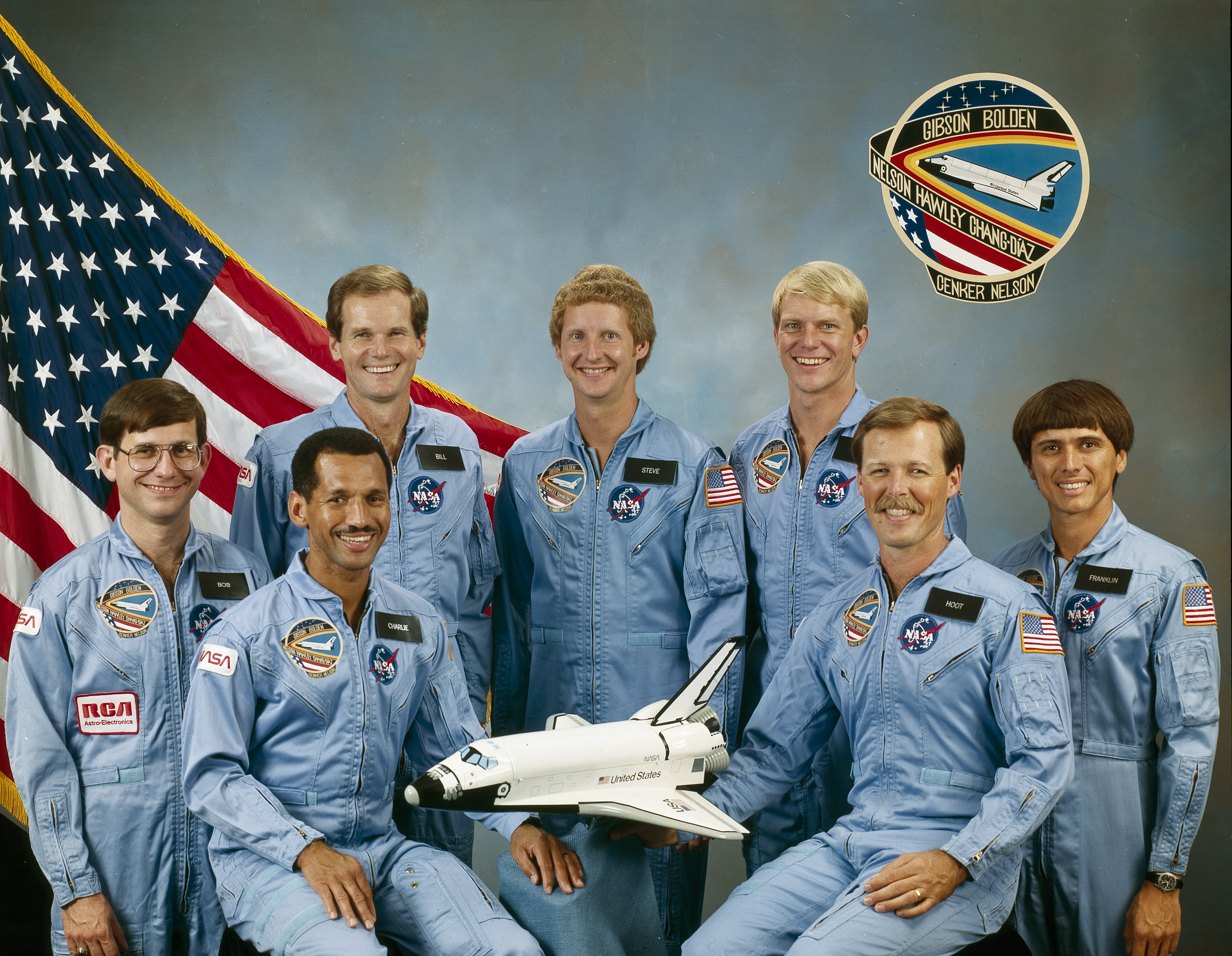
- STS-61-C mission patch Background: B. Nelson, Hawley and G. Nelson; Foreground: Cenker, Bolden, Gibson and Chang-Díaz Space Shuttle program

STS-61-C was the 24th mission of NASA's Space Shuttle program, and the seventh mission of Space Shuttle Columbia. It was the first time that Columbia, the first space-rated Space Shuttle orbiter to be constructed, had flown since STS-9. The mission launched from Florida's Kennedy Space Center on January 12, 1986, and landed six days later on January 18, 1986. STS-61-C's seven-person crew included the first Costa Rican-born astronaut, Franklin Chang-Díaz, the second African-American shuttle pilot, Charles Bolden, and the second sitting politician to fly in space, Rep. Bill Nelson (D-FL). Both Bolden and Nelson would also later go on to become Administrators of NASA. STS-61-C was the last shuttle mission before the Space Shuttle Challenger disaster, which occurred ten days after STS-61-C's landing.

== Crew ==
Position	Astronaut
Commander	(United States) Robert L. Gibson; Second spaceflight
Pilot	(United States) Charles Bolden; First spaceflight
Mission Specialist 1	(United States) George Nelson; Second spaceflight
Mission Specialist 2 Flight Engineer	(United States) Steven Hawley; Second spaceflight
Mission Specialist 3	(United States) / (Costa Rica) Franklin Chang-Díaz; First spaceflight
Payload Specialist 1	(United States) Bill Nelson (U.S. Rep. D-FL); Only spaceflight Congressional observer
Payload Specialist 2	(United States) Robert J. Cenker; Only spaceflight Sponsor: RCA
Nelson was a Democratic Representative from Florida acting as a congressional observer. He was the second sitting member of Congress in space. Senator Jake Garn (R-UT) had previously flown on STS-51-D in the prior year.

Backup crew
Position	Astronaut
Payload Specialist 2	(United States) Gerard E. Magilton; Sponsor: RCA

=== Crew seat assignments ===
Seat	Launch	Landing	Seats 1–4 are on the flight deck. Seats 5–7 are on the mid-deck.
1	Gibson		Seats 1–4 are on the flight deck. Seats 5–7 are on the mid-deck.
2	Bolden		Seats 1–4 are on the flight deck. Seats 5–7 are on the mid-deck.
3	G. Nelson	Chang-Díaz	Seats 1–4 are on the flight deck. Seats 5–7 are on the mid-deck.
4	Hawley		Seats 1–4 are on the flight deck. Seats 5–7 are on the mid-deck.
5	Chang-Díaz	G. Nelson	Seats 1–4 are on the flight deck. Seats 5–7 are on the mid-deck.
6	B. Nelson		Seats 1–4 are on the flight deck. Seats 5–7 are on the mid-deck.
7	Cenker		Seats 1–4 are on the flight deck. Seats 5–7 are on the mid-deck.

== Mission background ==
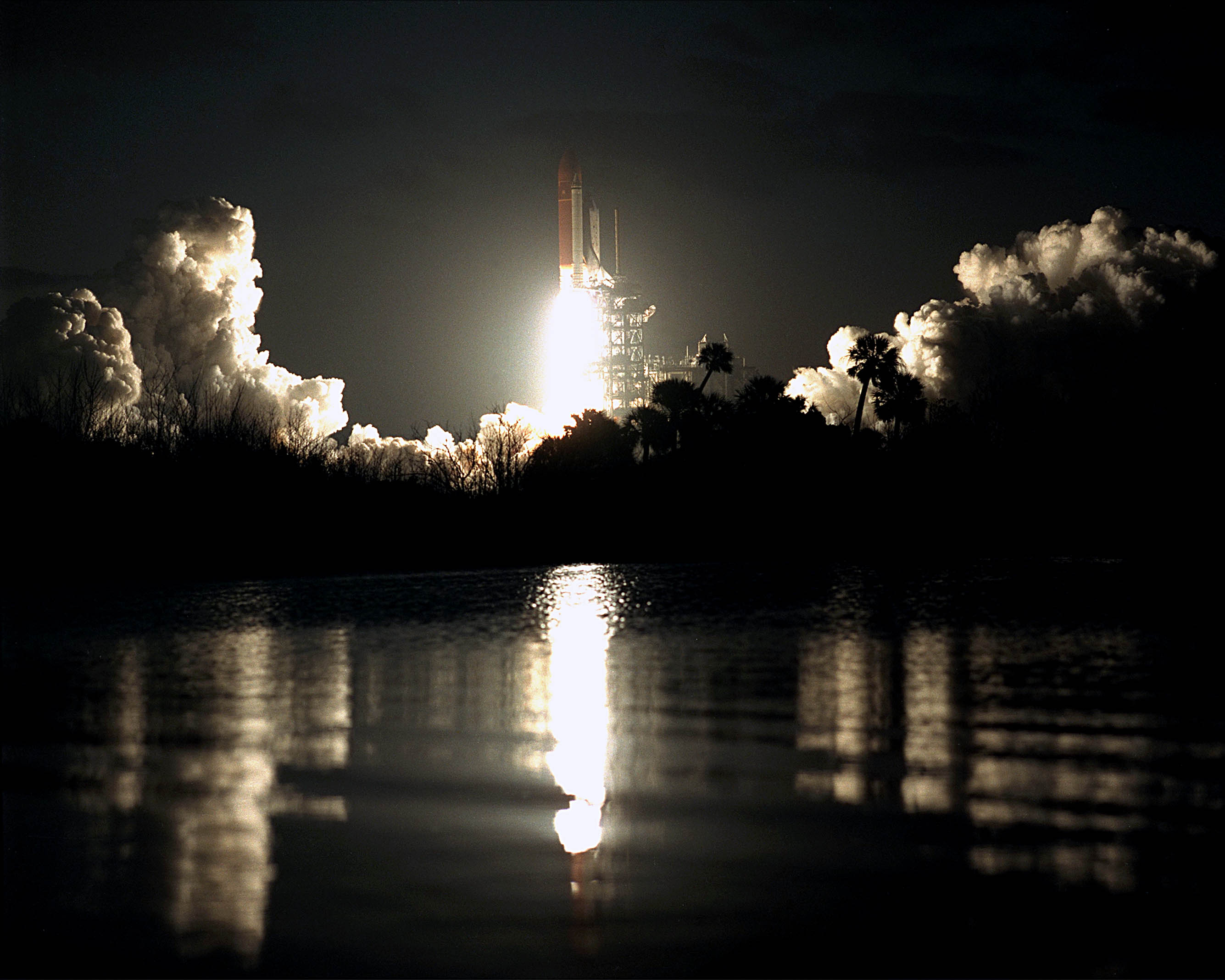
STS-61-C lifts off from Launch Complex 39A at Kennedy Space Center

Attempt	Planned	Result	Turnaround	Reason	Decision point	Weather go (%)	Notes
1	18 Dec 1985, 7:00:00 am	Scrubbed	—	Weather			Technicians needed additional time to close out the orbiter's aft compartment.
2	19 Dec 1985, 7:55:00 am	Scrubbed	1 day 0 hours 55 minutes	Technical	19 Dec 1985, 7:54 am (T−00:00:14)		The right SRB's Hydraulic Power Unit displayed an out-of-tolerance turbine reading.
3	6 Jan 1986, 7:05:00 am	Scrubbed	17 days 23 hours 10 minutes	Technical	6 Jan 1986, 7:04 am (T−00:00:31)		Countdown was held at T−02:55 due to a LOX fill and drain valve not closing. The countdown stopped at T−31 seconds when a liquid oxygen replenish valve failed to close.
4	7 Jan 1986, 7:05:00 am	Scrubbed	1 day 0 hours 0 minutes	Weather	7 Jan 1986, 9:33 am (T−00:09:00 hold)		Bad weather at transoceanic abort landing sites.
5	9 Jan 1986, 7:05:00 am	Scrubbed	2 days 0 hours 0 minutes	Technical	8 Jan 1986, 7:05 am		Problem with SSME prevalve.
6	10 Jan 1986, 6:55:00 am	Scrubbed	0 days 23 hours 50 minutes	Weather	10 Jan 1986, 8:45 am (T−00:09:00 hold)		Heavy rainfall in KSC area.
7	12 Jan 1986, 6:55:00 am	Success	2 days 0 hours 0 minutes				Total turnaround time 25 days.

STS-61-C saw Columbia return to flight for the first time since the STS-9 mission in November 1983, after having undergone major modifications over the course of 18 months by Rockwell International in California. Most notable of these modifications was the addition of the SILTS (Shuttle Infrared Leeside Temperature Sensing) pod atop Columbia's vertical stabilizer, which used an infrared camera to observe reentry heating on the shuttle's left wing and part of its fuselage. The camera was only used for a few more missions after STS-61-C, but the pod remained on Columbia for the remainder of its operational life. Smaller and more discreet modifications were also added at various points throughout the shuttle. The bulky ejection seats, which had been disabled after STS-4, were replaced with conventional seats and head-up displays for the commander and pilot were installed.

The launch was originally scheduled for December 18, 1985, but the closeout of an aft orbiter compartment was delayed, and the mission was rescheduled for the following day. However, on December 19, 1985, the countdown was stopped at T−14 seconds due to an out-of-tolerance turbine reading on the right SRB's hydraulic system. Another launch attempt, on January 6, 1986, was terminated at T−31 seconds because of a problem in a valve in the liquid oxygen system. The countdown was recycled to T−20 minutes for a second launch attempt on the same day, but was held at T−9 minutes, and then scrubbed as the launch window expired. Another attempt was made on January 7, 1986, but was scrubbed because of bad weather at contingency landing sites at Dakar, Senegal, and Morón de la Frontera, Spain; yet another attempt, on January 9, 1986, was delayed because of a problem with a main engine prevalve, and on January 10, 1986, heavy rainfall in the launch area led to another scrub.

== Mission summary ==
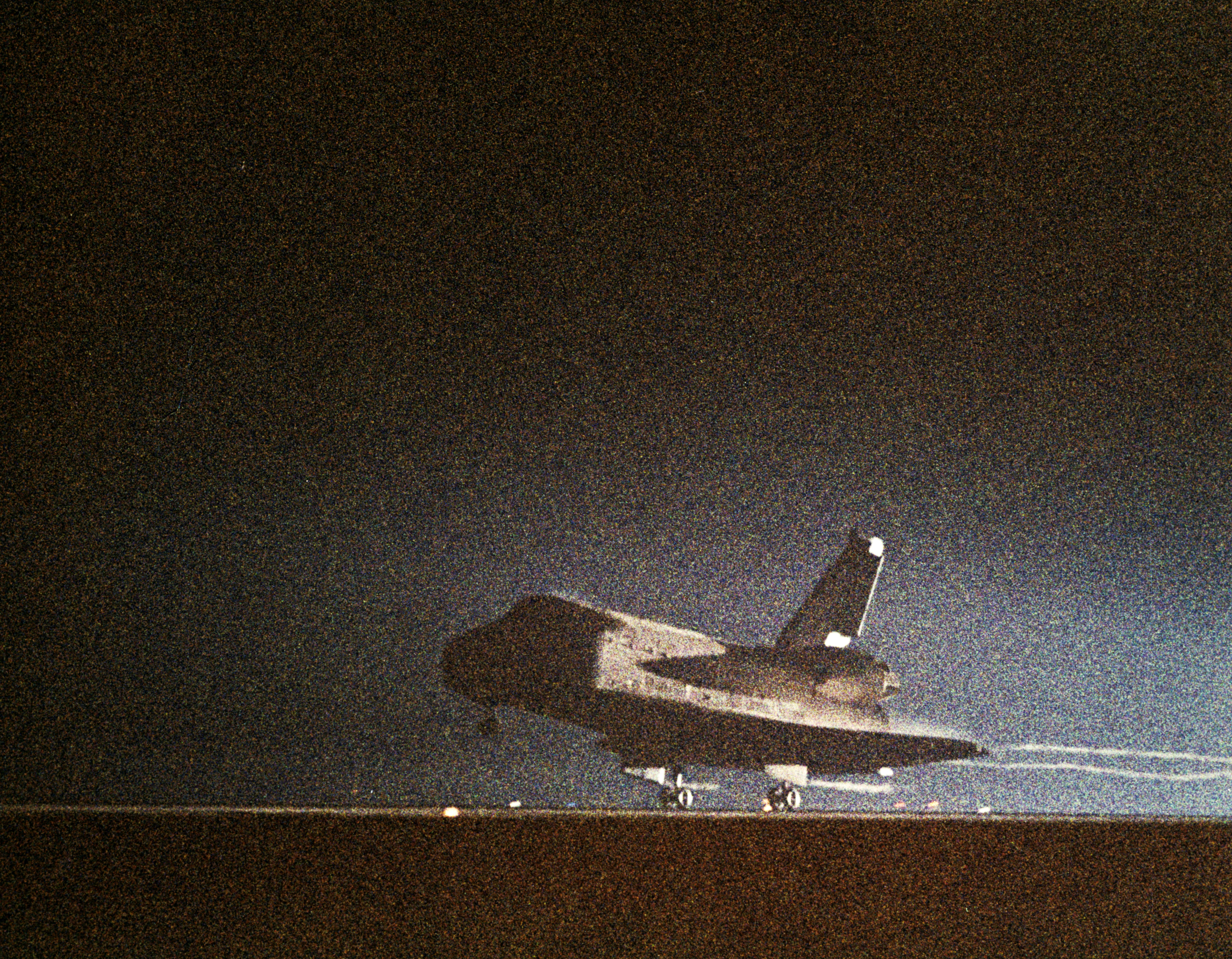
STS-61-C lands on Runway 22 at Edwards Air Force Base

After four unsuccessful launch attempts, Columbia launched successfully from Kennedy Space Center at 6:55:00 a.m. EST on January 12, 1986. There were no significant anomalies reported during the launch.

The primary objective of the mission was to deploy the Satcom-K1 communications satellite, second in a planned series of geosynchronous satellites owned and operated by RCA Americom; the deployment was successful. Columbia also carried a large number of small scientific experiments, including 13 Getaway Special (GAS) canisters devoted to investigations involving the effect of microgravity on materials processing, seed germination, chemical reactions, egg hatching, astronomy, atmospheric physics, and an experiment designed by Ellery Kurtz and Howard Wishnow of Vertical Horizons* to determine the effects of the space environment on fine arts materials and original oil paintings, flying four of Kurtz's paintings into space. It also carried the Materials Science Laboratory-2 structure for experiments involving liquid bubble suspension by sound waves, melting and resolidification of metallic samples and container-less melting and solidification of electrically conductive specimens. Another small experiment carrier located in the payload bay was the Hitchhiker G-1 (HHG-1), which carried three experiments to study film particles in the orbiter environment, test a new heat transfer system and determine the effects of contamination and atomic oxygen on ultraviolet optics materials, respectively. There were also four in-cabin experiments, three of them part of the Shuttle Student Involvement Program. The shuttle carried an experiment called the Comet Halley Active Monitoring Program (CHAMP), consisting of a 35 mm (1.4 in) camera intended to photograph Halley's Comet through the aft flight deck overhead window. This experiment proved unsuccessful because of battery problems.

According to Bolden, in addition to deploying the RCA satellite, Cenker operated a classified experiment for the United States Air Force during the mission. Bolden was only told that it was a prototype for an infrared imaging camera.

STS-61-C was originally scheduled to last seven days, but NASA decided to end it after four because its delays had delayed the next flight, STS-51-L. It was rescheduled to land on January 17, 1986, but this was brought forward by one day. However, the landing attempt on January 16, 1986, was canceled because of unfavorable weather at Edwards Air Force Base. Continued bad weather forced another wave-off the following day. The flight was extended one more day to provide for a landing opportunity at Kennedy Space Center on January 18, 1986 – this was in order to avoid time lost in an Edwards Air Force Base landing and turnaround. However, bad weather at the KSC landing site resulted in yet another wave-off.

Columbia finally landed at Edwards Air Force Base on its fifth landing attempt at 5:59:51 a.m. PST, on January 18, 1986. The mission lasted a total of 6 days, 2 hours, 3 minutes, and 51 seconds. STS-61-C was the last successful Space Shuttle flight before the Challenger disaster, which occurred on January 28, 1986, only 10 days after Columbia's return. Accordingly, commander Gibson later called the STS-61-C mission "The End of Innocence" for the Shuttle Program.

Nelson, the Florida congressman, had hoped to receive a Florida orange after landing in the state. The personnel at Edwards greeted the crew with what Bolden described as a "basket of California oranges and grapefruits".

== Wake-up calls ==
NASA began a tradition of playing music to astronauts during the Project Gemini, and first used music to wake up a flight crew during Apollo 15. Each track is specially chosen, often by the astronauts' families, and usually has a special meaning to an individual member of the crew, or is applicable to their daily activities.

Flight Day	Song	Artist/Composer
Day 2	"Liberty Bell March"	John Philip Sousa
Day 3	"Heart of Gold"	Neil Young
Day 4	"Stars and Stripes Forever"	John Philip Sousa

== Gag photo ==
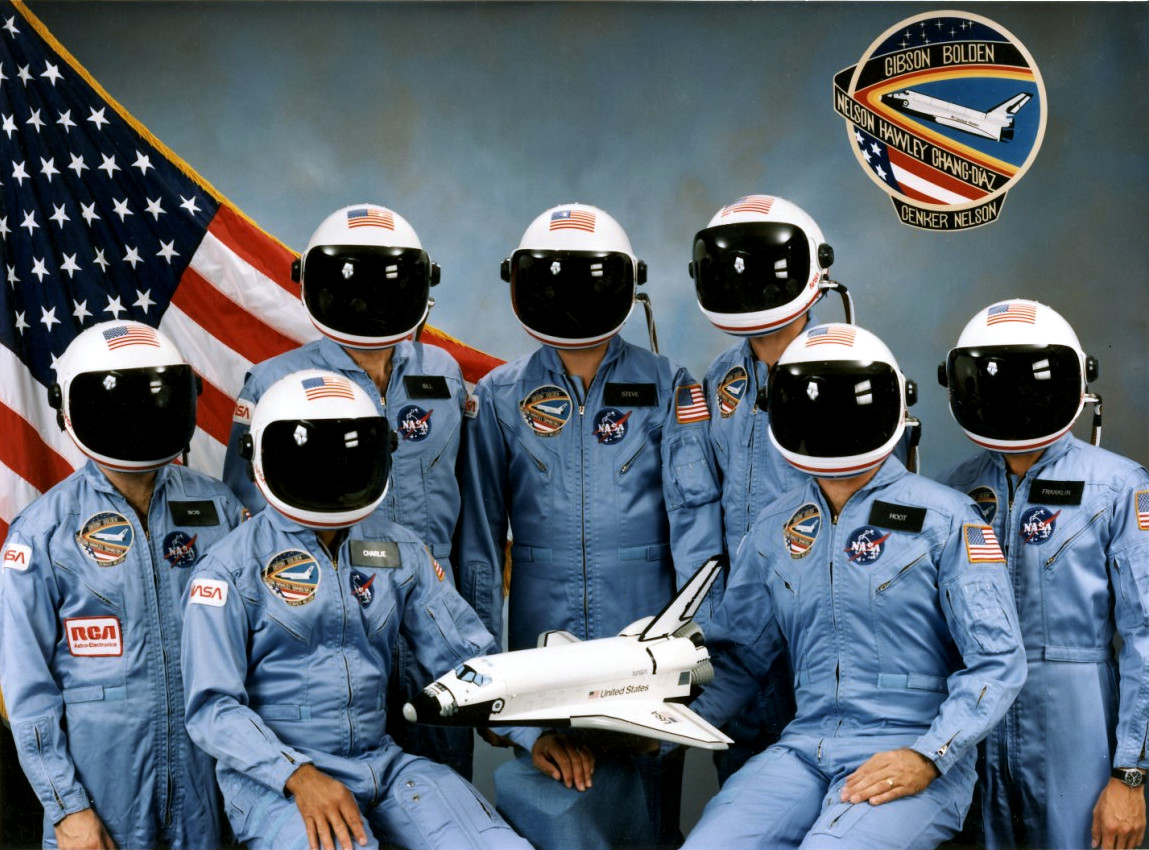
Gag photo of the STS-61-C crew

During the same session as the official crew photo, the NASA photographer took a gag photo of the STS-61-C crew with their heads and faces obscured by their helmets and visors.

== See also ==
- List of human spaceflights
- List of Space Shuttle missions
