= Menallen Township, Fayette County, Pennsylvania =

Township in Pennsylvania, US

Menallen Township
- Township
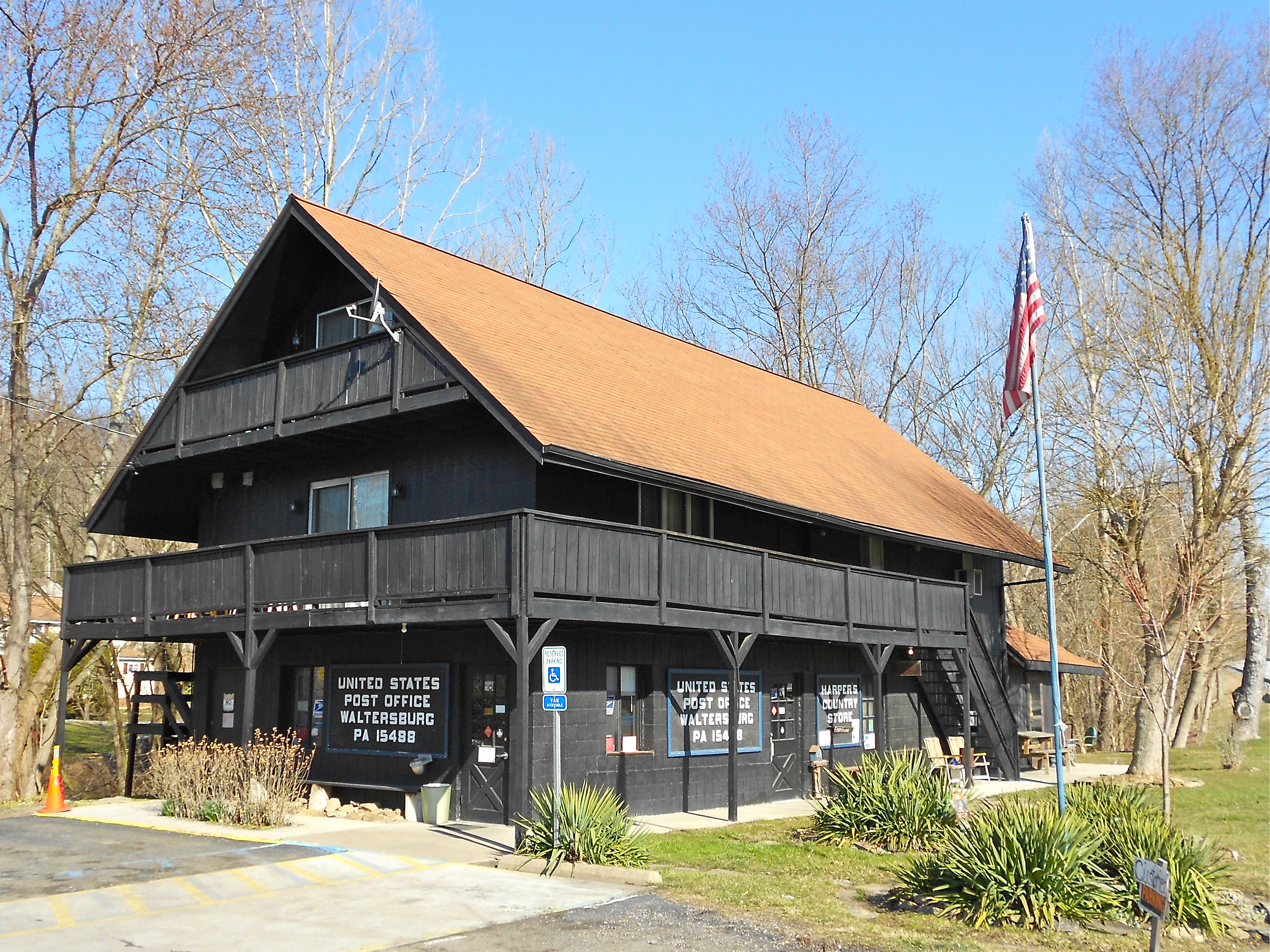
- Waltersburg Post Office

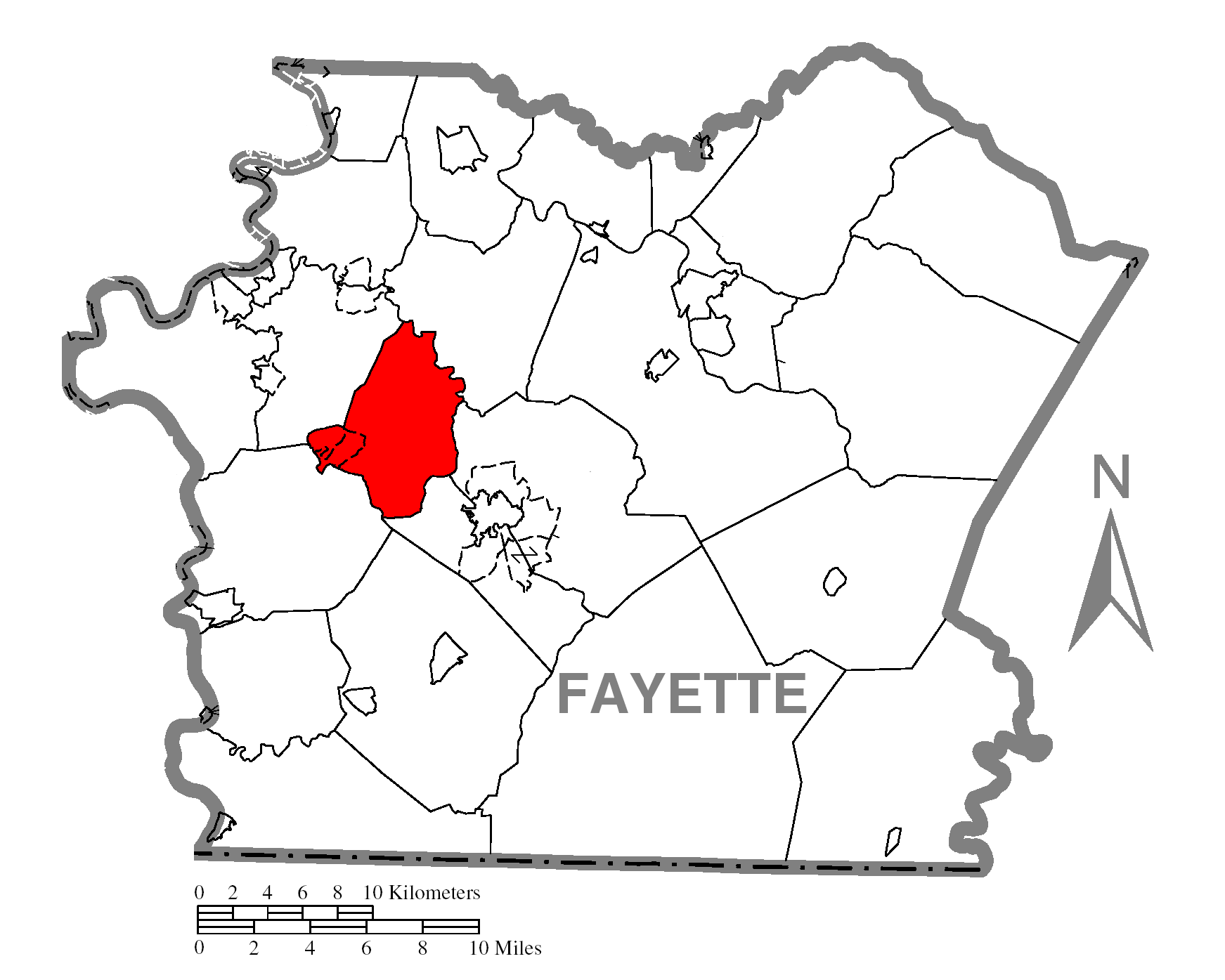
- Location of Menallen Township in Fayette County

- Location of Fayette County in Pennsylvania
- Country: United States
- State: Pennsylvania
- County: Fayette

Area
  - Total: 21.34 sq mi (55.27 km^{2})
  - Land: 21.29 sq mi (55.14 km^{2})
  - Water: 0.046 sq mi (0.12 km^{2})

Population (2020)
  - Total: 4,095 ▼
  - Estimate (2022): 4,065
  - Density: 191.5/sq mi (73.94/km^{2})
- Time zone: UTC-4 (EST)
  - Summer (DST): UTC-5 (EDT)
- Area code: 724
- FIPS code: 42-051-48616
- Website: https://menallen.org/

Menallen Township is a township in Fayette County, Pennsylvania, United States. It is part of the Pittsburgh metropolitan area. The population was 4,095 at the 2020 census, a decline from the figure of 4,205 tabulated in 2010. The Uniontown Area School District serves the region.

The township is named after an older variant spelling of Moyallen, County Down, now in Northern Ireland.

Waltersburg, Keisterville, Upper Middletown, Searights, Buffington, New Salem, Haddenville, Shamrock, Upper Peanut, Lower Peanut, Dearth, Rocks Works, Newboro, and portions of Smock and Balsinger are located in this township.

== Geography ==
The township is in west central Fayette County and is bordered to the northeast by Redstone Creek, a tributary of the Monongahela River. U.S. Route 40 (the National Road) and Pennsylvania Route 43 (the Mon–Fayette Expressway) cross the township, both leading southeast to Uniontown, the county seat. US 40 leads northwest to Brownsville, while the Mon–Fayette leads northwest to Centerville and ultimately Jefferson Hills outside Pittsburgh. The expressway can be accessed from Exit 18 in Menallen Township, serving Keisterville.

According to the United States Census Bureau, the township has a total area of 21.4 square miles (55.3 km^{2}), of which 0.05 square miles (0.12 km^{2}), or 0.23%, is water.

== Demographics ==
Historical population
Census	Pop.	Note	%±
2010	4,205		—
2020	4,095		−2.6%
2022 (est.)	4,065		−0.7%
U.S. Decennial Census

As of the 2000 census, there were 4,644 people, 1,810 households, and 1,348 families residing in the township. The population density was 218.6 inhabitants per square mile (84.4/km^{2}). There were 1,964 housing units at an average density of 92.4 per square mile (35.7/km^{2}). The racial makeup of the township was 95.78% White, 3.12% African American, 0.13% Native American, 0.11% Asian, and 0.86% from two or more races. Hispanic or Latino of any race were 0.34% of the population.

There were 1,810 households, out of which 32.9% had children under the age of 18 living with them, 54.1% were married couples living together, 14.9% had a female householder with no husband present, and 25.5% were non-families. 22.4% of all households were made up of individuals, and 11.5% had someone living alone who was 65 years of age or older. The average household size was 2.56 and the average family size was 2.98.

In the township the population was spread out, with 24.6% under the age of 18, 6.6% from 18 to 24, 28.0% from 25 to 44, 24.7% from 45 to 64, and 16.2% who were 65 years of age or older. The median age was 40 years. For every 100 females, there were 90.2 males. For every 100 females age 18 and over, there were 89.7 males.

The median income for a household in the township was $32,591, and the median income for a family was $38,607. Males had a median income of $31,037 versus $25,274 for females. The per capita income for the township was $16,186. About 13.4% of families and 16.2% of the population were below the poverty line, including 27.2% of those under age 18 and 10.2% of those age 65 or over.

== Sewage treatment / enforcement ==
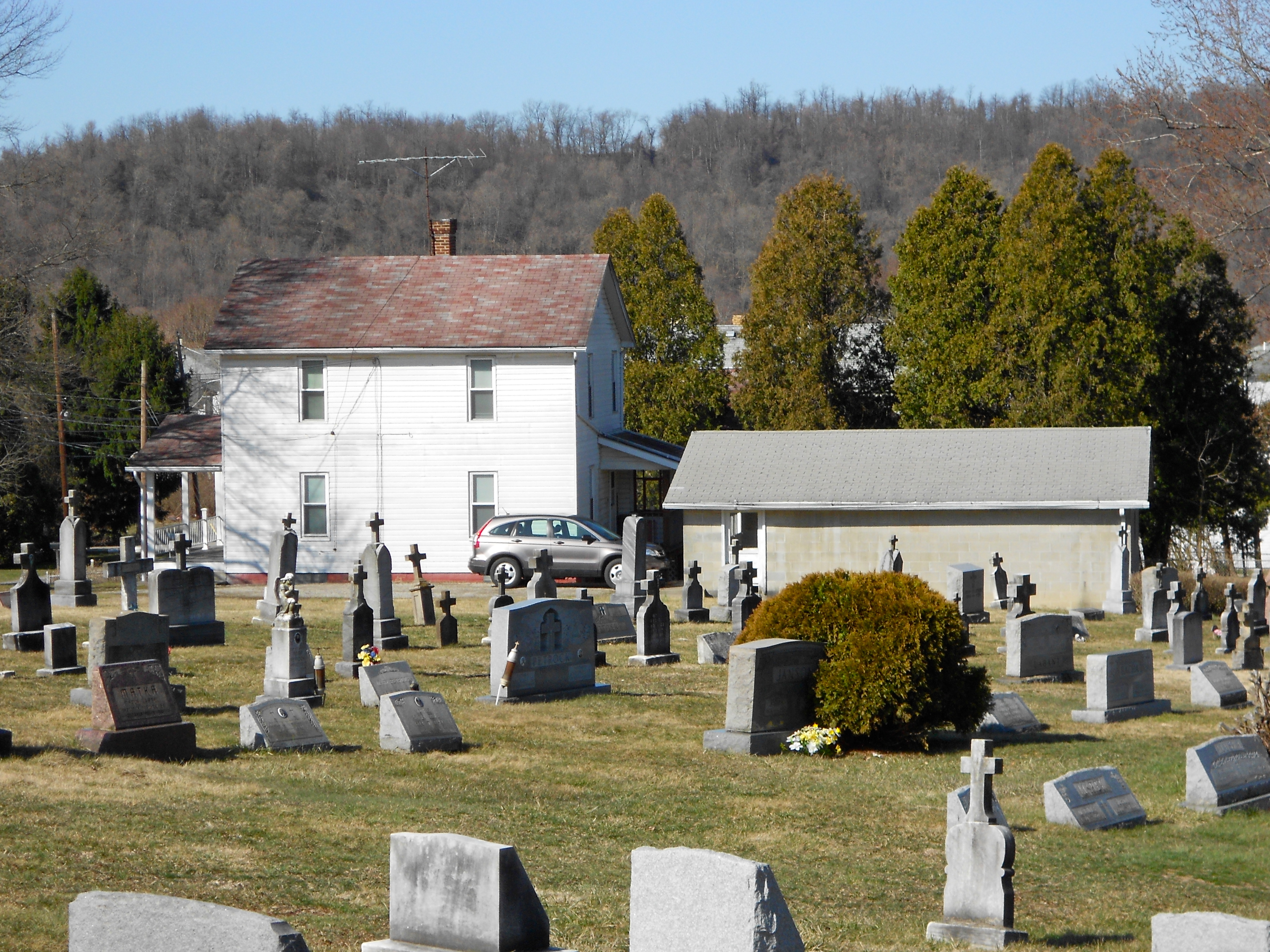
Smock Historic District

Sewage treatment and enforcement for Menallen Township is handled by the Menallen Township Sewer Authority. About 1,200 customers are connected to public sewage treatment systems throughout the township. There are currently two treatment plants in the township.

== Historic sites ==
Searights, located within Menallen Township, is the home to Searights Toll House. This facility was constructed to collect fees from travelers on the National Road in the 19th century. It is one of the last surviving toll houses along the route's path.

The Smock Historic District, Searights Tollhouse, National Road, Abel Colley Tavern and Josiah Frost House are listed on the National Register of Historic Places.

== Notable people ==
- Heisman winner and football standout Ernie Davis was born in the Buffington section of the township, and raised in nearby Uniontown.
- Although he was born in Chicago, Hall of Fame Basketball coach Mike Krzyzewski's family was originally from the Keisterville section of the township.
