= Youngstown station =

Youngstown station may refer to:

- Youngstown station (Baltimore and Ohio Railroad) Extant, revived twice by Amtrak
- Youngstown station (Erie Railroad) Extant, closed in 1977 by Conrail; served by the Pittsburgh and Lake Erie Railroad
- Youngstown station (Pennsylvania Railroad) Extant, currently owned by Phantom Fireworks
- Youngstown station (New York Central Railroad) Demolished; also served by the Pittsburgh and Lake Erie Railroad
