= West Pittsburg station =

Coordinates: 40°56′09″N 80°21′57″W

West Pittsburg
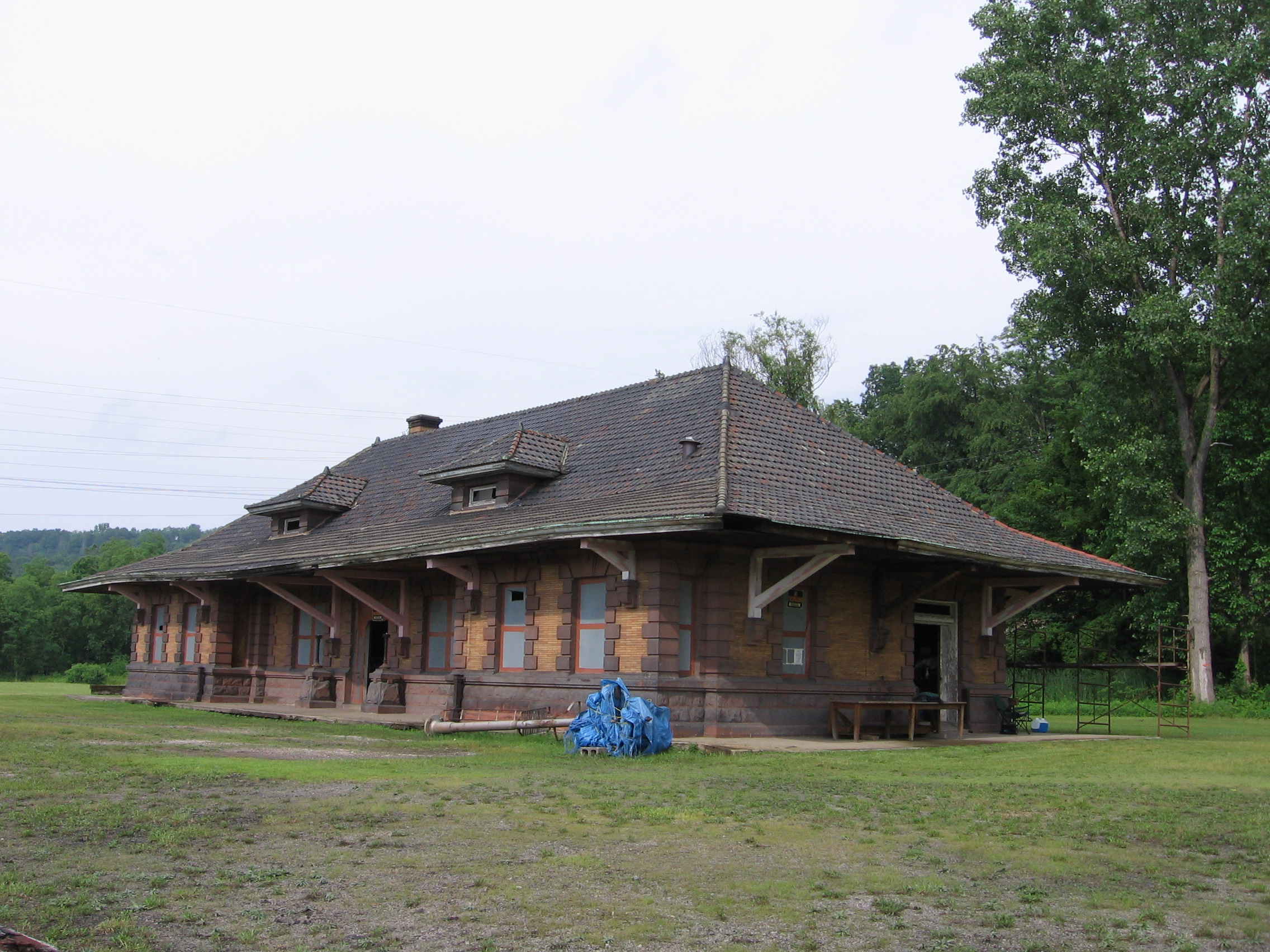

General information
- Owner: Beaver-Lawrence Railway Historical Society
- Platforms: 2
- Tracks: 3

History
- Opened: 1907

Services
Preceding station	New York Central Railroad	Following station
Youngstown (NYC RR) toward Youngstown (Erie RR)	Pittsburgh and Lake Erie Railroad Main Line	College Hill toward Pittsburgh
Edinburg toward Youngstown	Pittsburgh and Lake Erie Railroad Main Line	Newport toward Pittsburgh
Location

The West Pittsburg Station is a former railway station that was constructed and used by the Pittsburgh and Lake Erie Railroad. The station building is located just south of the city of New Castle, Pennsylvania in the small village of West Pittsburg. The station is also located at the south end of the old Baltimore and Ohio Railroad New Castle Yard which is now used by CSX Transportation. Major rail lines that pass the station into the yard include the New Castle Subdivision, the P&W Subdivision, and the Pittsburgh Subdivision. The station is currently under restoration by the Beaver Lawrence Railway Historical Society which hopes to turn the structure into a museum.
