= Aliquippa station =

Historic railway station in Pennsylvania, USA

Aliquippa
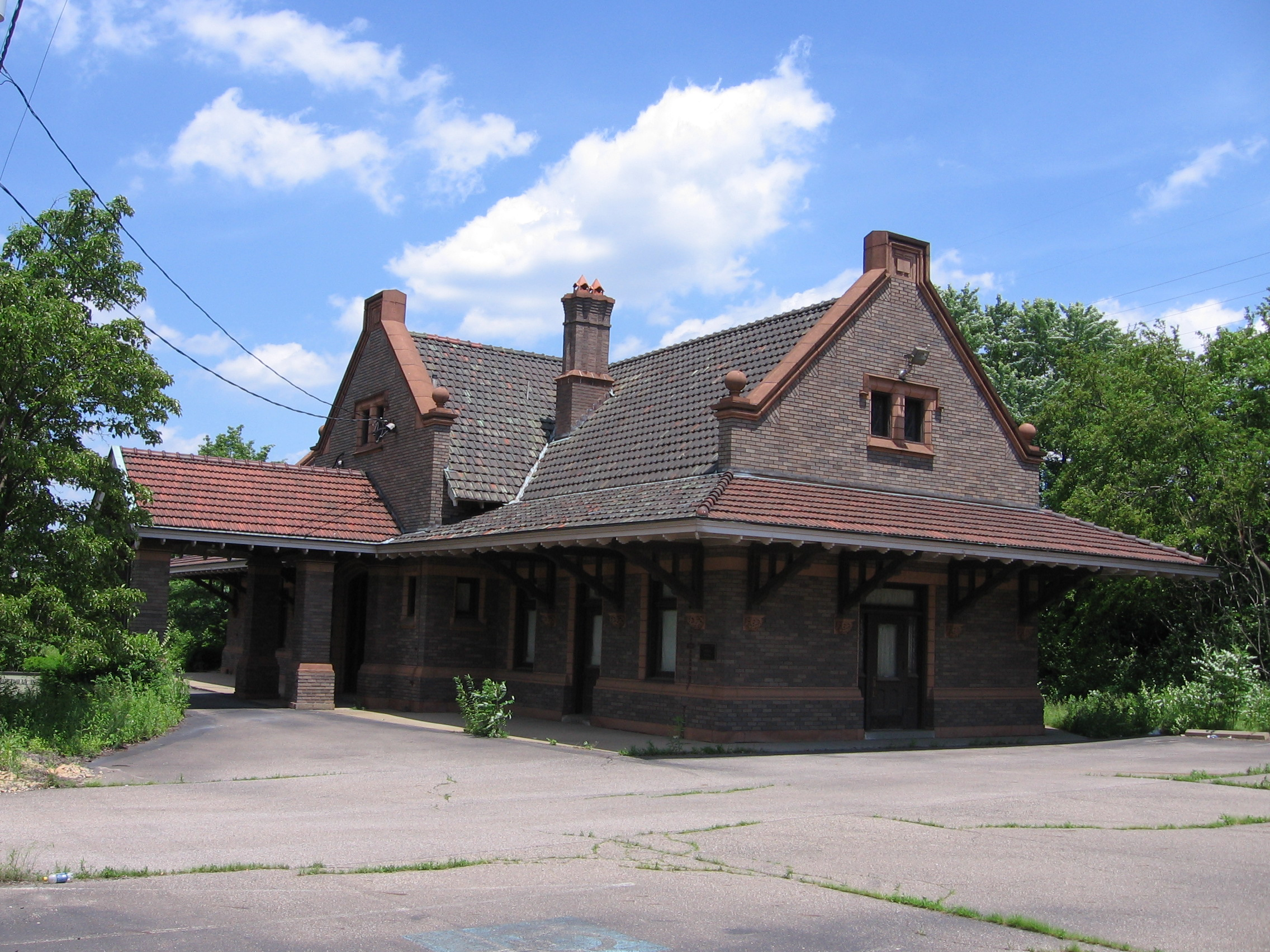

General information
- Location: Hopewell Avenue
- Platforms: 2
- Tracks: 3

History
- Opened: 1911

Services
Preceding station	New York Central Railroad	Following station
College Hill toward Youngstown	Pittsburgh and Lake Erie Railroad Main Line	South Heights toward Pittsburgh
West Aliquippa toward Youngstown	Pittsburgh and Lake Erie Railroad Main Line	West Economy toward Pittsburgh
- Pittsburgh and Lake Erie Passenger Station, Aliquippa
- U.S. National Register of Historic Places
- Location within Pennsylvania Location within the United States
- Location: 111 Station Street; Aliquippa, Pennsylvania
- Coordinates: 40°37′7.9″N 80°14′34.2″W
- Area: 1.3 acres (0.53 ha)
- Built: 1910
- Architect: John L. Stuard
- Architectural style: Bungalow/Craftsman, Tudor Revival
- NRHP reference No.: 90000700
- Added to NRHP: April 26, 1990
Location

Aliquippa station is a former railway station located in Aliquippa, Pennsylvania, United States. The station was constructed and used by the now defunct Pittsburgh and Lake Erie Railroad (P&LE). Constructed in 1911, the station has also gone by the name of Woodlawn station because of the former town of Woodlawn that was merged with Aliquippa in the late 1870s. After the station closed to passengers, it was used for several years by the Jones and Laughlin Steel Company as an office building.

The structure currently sits vacant just outside the city of Aliquippa. The station was listed on the National Register of Historic Places in 1990 as the Pittsburgh and Lake Erie Passenger Station, Aliquippa.

The former P&LE is now operated by CSX Transportation.
