= Joseph Ladd Neal =

American architect

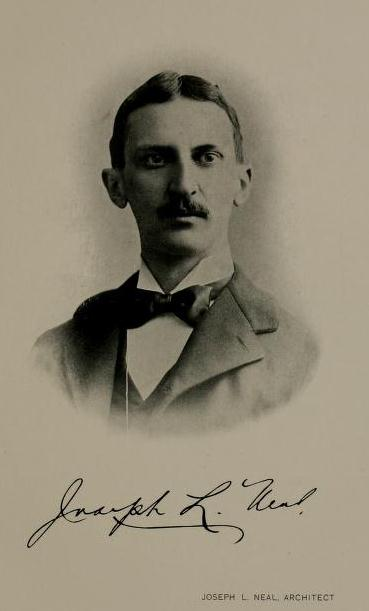
Joseph L. Neal, circa 1896.

Joseph Ladd Neal (1867–?) was an American architect who designed Richardsonian Romanesque, Shingle Style and Colonial Revival buildings.

Born in Wiscasset, Maine, the son of a hardware merchant, he apprenticed under Boston, Massachusetts architect Charles Howard Walker. He worked for Shepley, Rutan & Coolidge in Boston and James Renwick Jr. in New York City, before settling in Pittsburgh, Pennsylvania about 1892. In 1893 he established a partnership with S. Alfred Hopkins, that lasted a year. A partnership with George M. Rowland lasted from 1902 to 1906.

Four of his works – Lithgow Public Library, Merrill Memorial Library, College Hill Station, Small Point Club – are listed on the National Register of Historic Places.

== Selected works ==
- Lithgow Library and Reading Room, Augusta, Maine, 1894–96, with S. Alfred Hopkins. Neal & Hopkins won the commission in a national design competition with 65 submissions.
- First Unitarian Church, Pittsburgh, Pennsylvania, c. 1895.
- Small Point Club, Small Point, Maine, 1895-97.
- Morrill Memorial Library, Norwood, Massachusetts, 1897-98. A near-replica of Neal's Lithgow Library.
- Alterations to Beaver County Courthouse, Beaver, Pennsylvania, 1901.
- James Lyall Stuart house, Sewickley, Pennsylvania, c. 1905, with George M. Rowland.
- College Hill Station (Pittsburgh & Lake Erie Railroad), Geneva College, Beaver Falls, Pennsylvania, 1910, John Abiel Atwood, engineer.
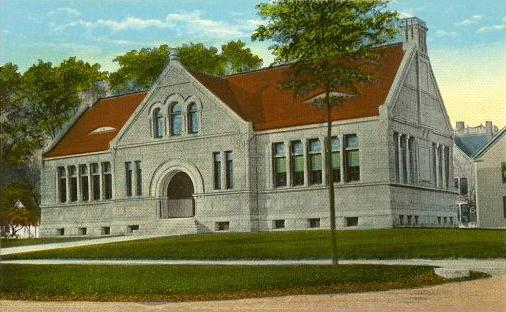
Lithgow Public Library, Augusta, Maine (1894–96).

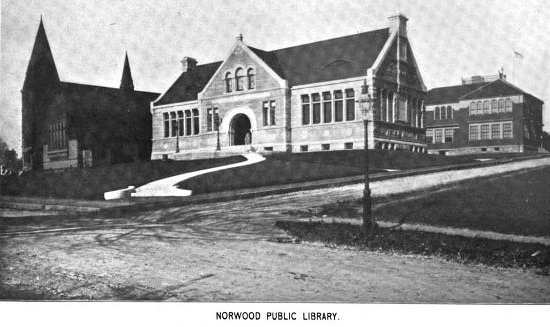
Merrill Memorial Library, Norwood, Massachusetts (1897–98).

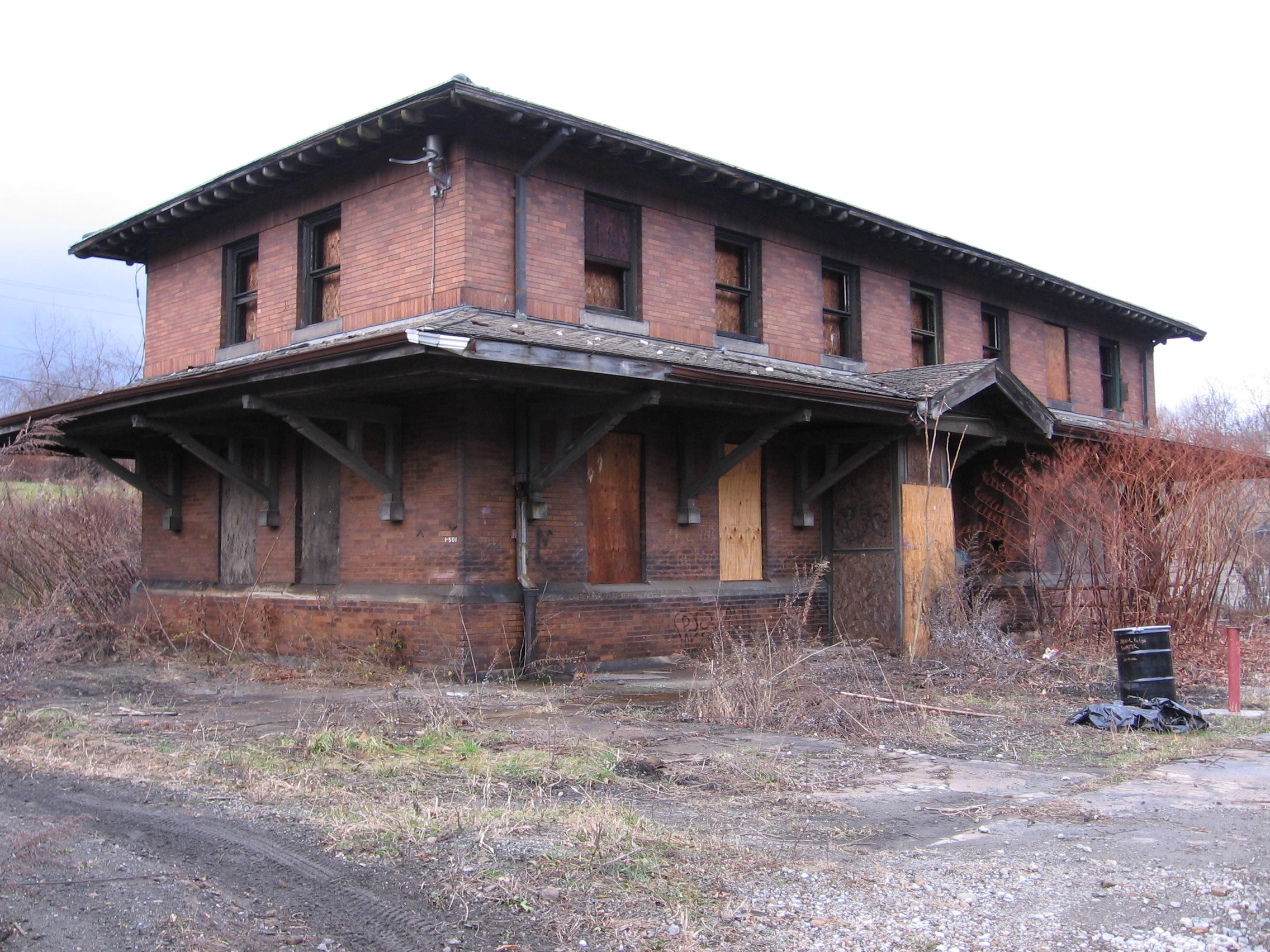
College Hill Station, Beaver Falls, Pennsylvania (1910).
