= College Hill station =

Former train station in Pennsylvania, US

Coordinates: 40.7674°N 80.3189°W

College Hill
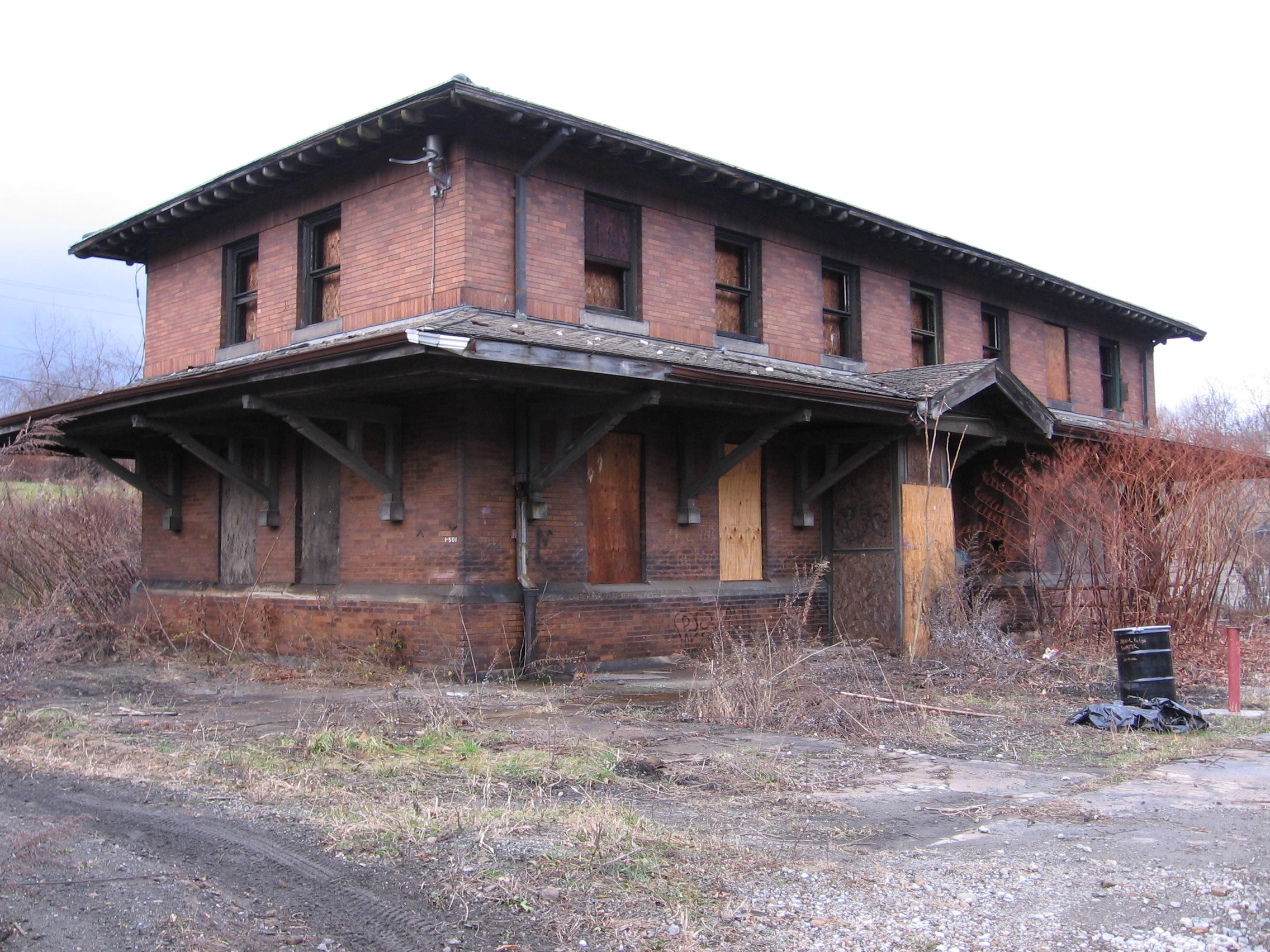
- College Hill Station in 2006

General information
- Platforms: 2
- Tracks: 1

History
- Opened: 1910
- Closed: July 12, 1985

Services
Preceding station	New York Central Railroad	Following station
West Pittsburg toward Youngstown	Pittsburgh and Lake Erie Railroad Main Line	Aliquippa toward Pittsburgh
West Ellwood Junction toward Youngstown	Pittsburgh and Lake Erie Railroad Main Line	Beaver Falls toward Pittsburgh
Location

College Hill station was a former train station located in Beaver Falls, Pennsylvania, United States. The structure was designed by architect Joseph Ladd Neal and built by the Pittsburgh and Lake Erie Railroad to help transport goods and passengers in and out of the neighborhood of College Hill in Beaver Falls. Downtown Beaver Falls once had a passenger station of its own, but it has since been demolished, along with the freight station in 2007.

== History ==
The station was constructed in 1910 by "The Little Giant", and was mostly used by Geneva College students and community members of College Hill. Between the 1950s and 1980s, many railroad stations in Western Pennsylvania, and across the United States began shutting down. Unlike many stations in the area, College Hill did not close down and survived well into the 1980s. During that time, the P&LE ran a commuter train between Beaver Falls and Pittsburgh with the College Hill station located at the north terminus. On July 12, 1985, the P&LE made its last commuter run, making College Hill the last station to be used by passengers on the railroad. This would also be the final passenger train for the station. By 1993, the P&LE was bought by CSX Transportation, and the station was abandoned.

On December 31, 1997, the station was sold by P&LE to Geneva College for $35,000.

The Pittsburgh History & Landmarks Foundation (PHLF) proposed a plan to restore College (Hill) Station in 2007/2008 as part of a restoration plan for Geneva College made possible by a grant from The Getty Foundation Campus Heritage Grants and Geneva College. This plan appears to have never been fulfilled.

On May 28, 2008, the station was sold by Geneva College to AES Realty, LLC for $10,000 (after calculating for inflation, the $35,000 paid for College Station in 1997 would equal $46,950.81 in 2008).

== Current status ==
The station building was still standing as of 2016, but was slowly deteriorating after being closed for more than twenty years. It was also located at the bottom of a large embankment along the Beaver River near the Eastvale Bridge. Because of its locale, the station could easily be missed. As of 2016, there were no plans to restore the structure. On June 19, 2017, fire destroyed the structure.
