= S&C Subdivision =

Railway line in Pennsylvania

Overview
- Other name(s): Somerset and Cambria Subdivision
- Status: Operational
- Owner: CSX
- Locale: Pennsylvania
- Termini: Rockwood; Johnstown

Service
- Type: Freight rail
- System: CSX
- Operator(s): CSX

Technical
- Number of tracks: 1
- Track gauge: 4 ft 8 1/2 in (1,435 mm) standard gauge
- Signalling: BFC

The S&C Subdivision is a railroad line owned and operated by CSX Transportation in the U.S. state of Pennsylvania. The line runs from the Keystone Subdivision at Rockwood north to Johnstown along a former Baltimore and Ohio Railroad line, once the Somerset and Cambria Railroad.

== History ==
The Somerset & Mineral Point Railroad connected Somerset to what was then the Pittsburgh & Connellsville Railroad as it passed through Rockwood (then called Mineral Point) in the early 1870s.

The Johnstown & Somerset Railroad followed the Stonycreek Valley north-by-northeast from Somerset through Stoystown to Johnstown around 1880. The Somerset & Mineral Point Railroad and the Johnstown & Somerset Railroad were combined and reorganized as the Somerset and Cambria Branch Railroad.

Through leases and mergers, the line became part of the B&O and then CSX.
