= Gateway Yard =

Coordinates: 41°4′40″N 80°36′40″W

The Gateway Yard of the Pittsburgh and Lake Erie Railroad, located in Youngstown, Ohio, opened in the fall of 1957 and remained in operation until CSX took over the P&LE and closed the yard in 1993. Gateway served as a place to classify and sort freight cars as well as an interchange with the Baltimore and Ohio Railroad and the New York Central Railroad. Most of the cars that entered the yard were destined for Youngstown's steel mills.

== History ==
The yard itself was built on over 200 acres (0.81 km^{2}) of land and stretched for more than 5 miles (8.0 km) covering the distance from the Center Street Bridge to Lowellville, Ohio. The yard included a classification yard, office complex, diesel locomotive servicing facilities, and car repair facilities. The yard tower and yard office are housed in the same building. It is rather large and resembles an aircraft control tower. Running in front of the tower is the yard's hump that is used in the sorting freight cars. The Pittsburgh & Lake Erie Railroad Historical Society website includes a list of yard structures including their blueprints. Items include:

- The Gateway Yard at work
- Cars being sorted over the Hump
- 1993 photo showing the rear of the tower

Today the Gateway Yard sits mostly empty after being closed in 1993. Most of the tracks have been removed. However, most of the structures still stand including the yard tower and office building. Vandals have taken a toll on the site. The office/tower complex have had every window broken out, including those that overlook the hump that runs in front of the tower. Railfanning the Gateway Yard is not hard since Ohio State Route 289 runs alongside the yard. The yard tower is visible from the road, and the CSX mainline runs right in between the tower and the road. Also visible from route 289 is the large car repair shed and several small support structures.
