= Station Square =

- Location: South Shore, Pittsburgh
- Developer: Pittsburgh History and Landmarks Foundation
- Manager: Brookfield Asset Management
- Public transit: Station Square: Blue Line; Red Line; Silver Line; South Busway
- Pittsburgh & Lake Erie Railroad Complex
- U.S. National Register of Historic Places
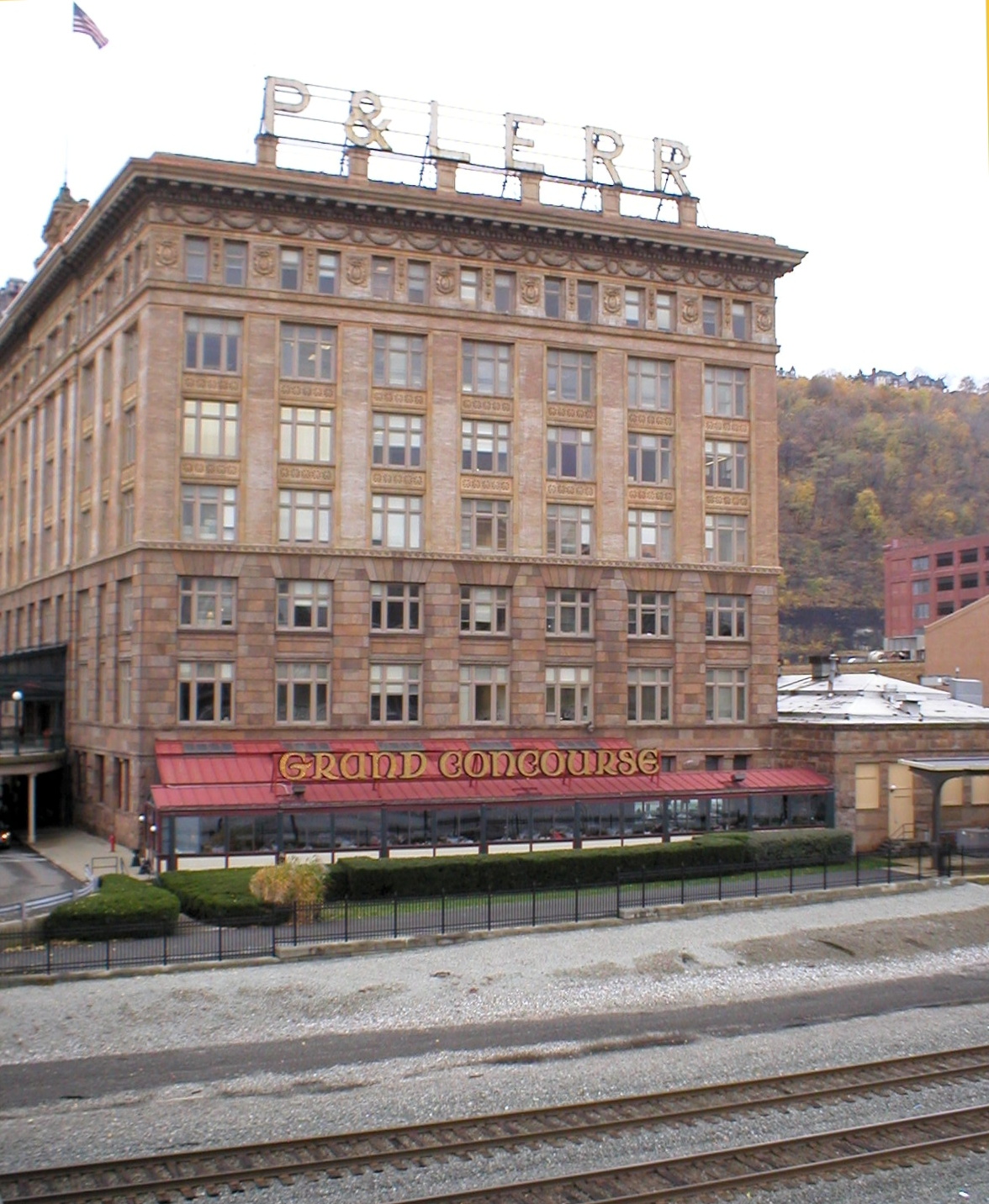
- The P&LE Railroad Station at Station Square

- Location within Pittsburgh Location within Pennsylvania Location within the United States
- Location: Smithfield and Carson Sts., Pittsburgh, Pennsylvania
- Coordinates: 40°26′6″N 80°0′27″W
- Area: 52 acres (21 ha)
- Built: 1897
- Architects: Pittsburgh & Lake Erie Railroad
- NRHP reference No.: 79002161
- Added to NRHP: December 31, 1979

Station Square is a 52-acre (210,000 m^{2}) entertainment complex located in the South Shore neighborhood of Pittsburgh, Pennsylvania, United States. It sits across the Monongahela River from the Golden Triangle of downtown Pittsburgh. Station Square occupies the buildings and land formerly occupied by the historic Pittsburgh & Lake Erie Railroad Complex, including the Pittsburgh & Lake Erie Railroad Station, which are separately listed on the National Register of Historic Places.

It features restaurants and entertainment venues, including Highmark Stadium and the 396-room Sheraton at Station Square. As one of Pittsburgh's largest tourist destinations, it attracts more than three million people annually, including many Pittsburgh natives. The retail development was built at the location of a former station on the Pittsburgh and Lake Erie Railroad, with many of the original structures such as the freight house building and the concourse being converted into restaurants. Proximity to a stop on the Port Authority of Allegheny County 'T' Pittsburgh Light Rail system and the dock for the Gateway Clipper Fleet of local river cruise boats makes Station Square a major parking and jumping-off point for activities and events around the city. The property is operated by Brookfield Asset Management.

In 1979, the Station Square complex was listed on the National Register of Historic Places as the "Pittsburgh & Lake Erie Railroad Complex."

== History ==
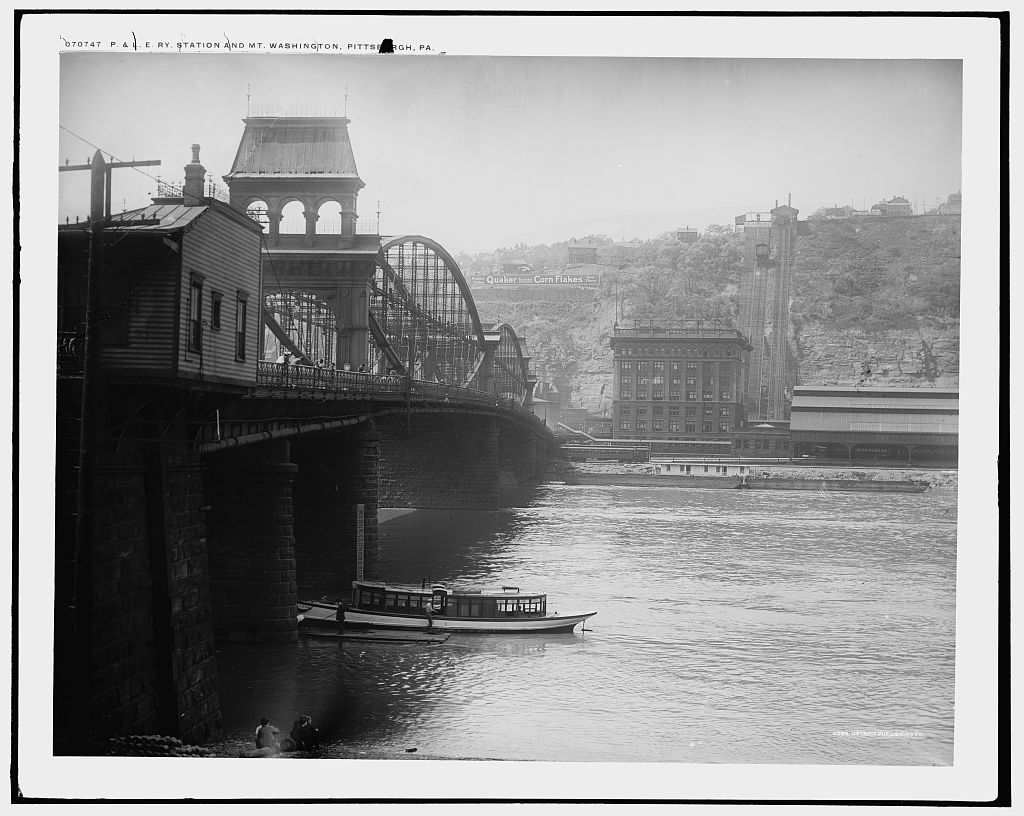
Station Square and Mt. Washington seen from across the river, c.1905

Station Square was conceptualized by Arthur P. Ziegler, Jr., one of the founding national leaders of historic preservation in the United States and President of the Pittsburgh History and Landmarks Foundation, or Landmarks. Landmarks developed the site in 1976 as a mixed-use historic adaptive reuse development that gave the foundation the opportunity to put its urban planning principles into practice.

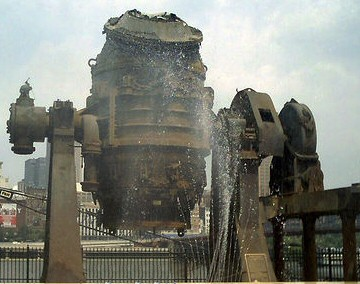
The Fountain at Bessemer Court in Station Square features a retired Bessemer converter.

Aided by an initial gift from the Allegheny Foundation in 1976, Landmarks adapted five historic Pittsburgh and Lake Erie Railroad buildings for new uses and added a hotel, a dock for the Gateway Clipper Fleet and parking areas. Now, shops, offices, restaurants and entertainment anchor the historic riverfront site on the south shore of the Monongahela River, opposite the Golden Triangle (Pittsburgh). It reflects a $100 million investment from all sources, with the lowest public cost and highest taxpayer return of any major renewal project in the Pittsburgh region since the 1950s. In 1994, Pittsburgh History and Landmarks Foundation sold Station Square to Forest City Realty Trust which created an endowment to help support its restoration efforts and educational programs. Each year the staff and docents of Pittsburgh History and Landmarks Foundation introduce more than 10,000 people — teachers, students, adults, and visitors — to the architectural heritage of the Pittsburgh region and to the value of historic preservation.

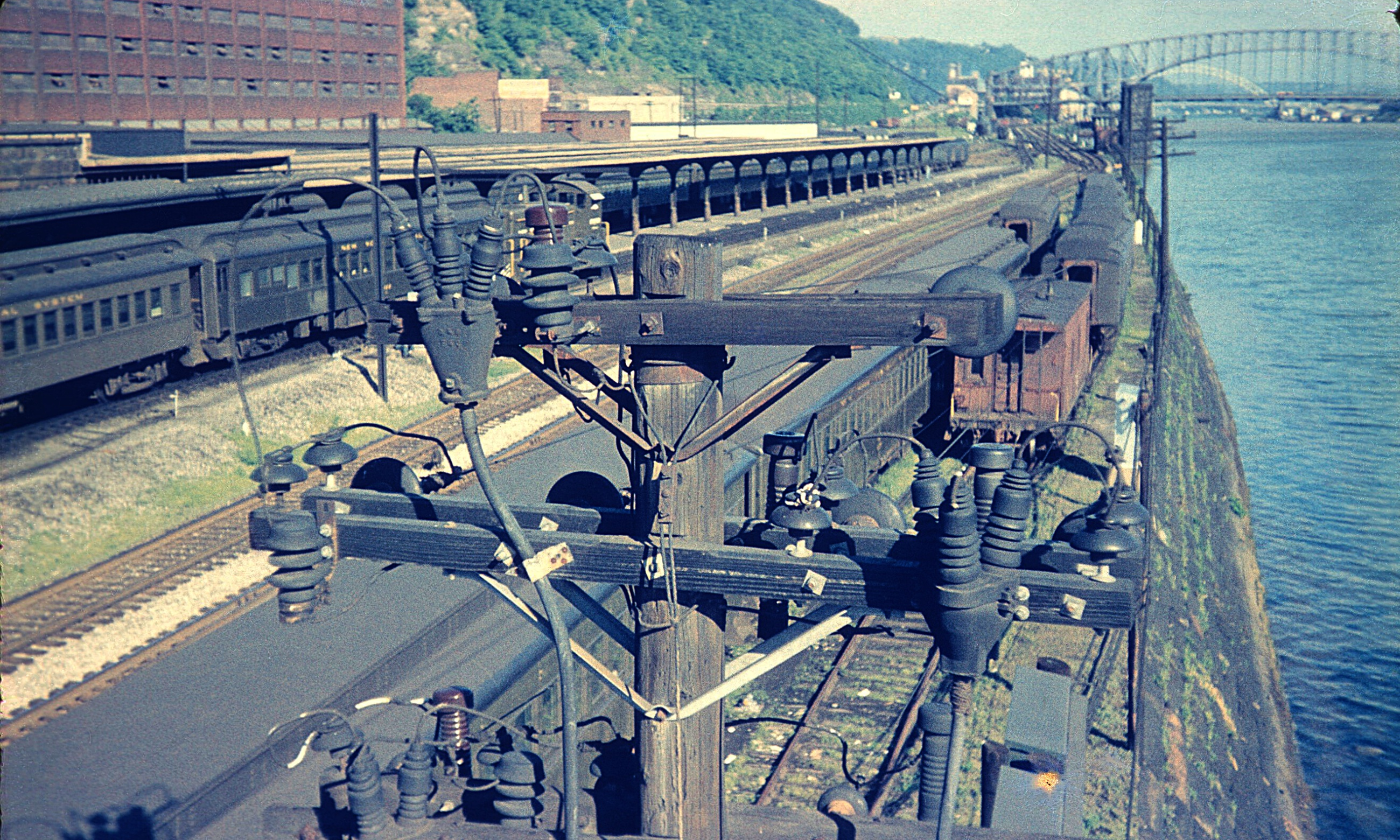
Station Square area looking west along the Monongahela River showing the back of P&LE Railroad Station c.1951

== See also ==
- Pittsburgh & Lake Erie Railroad Station
