= Lithgow Public Library =

Library in Augusta, Maine, United States

Coordinates: 44.315°N 69.7778°W

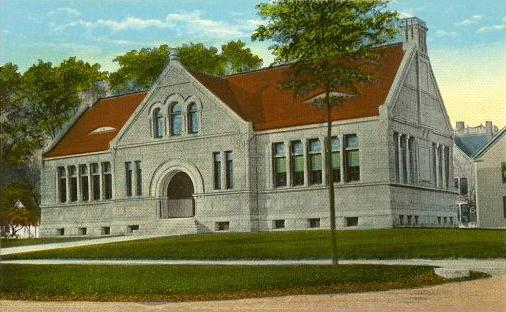
- The Lithgow Library, Augusta, ME; from a 1917 postcard.
- Location: 45 Winthrop Street; Augusta, Maine, United States
- Type: Public
- Established: 1896 (expanded 1979, 2016)

Collection
- Size: 67,000

Access and use
- Circulation: 164,000
- Population served: 19,136

Other information
- Budget: $586,359
- Director: Elizabeth Pohl
- Employees: 16
- Website: www.lithgow.lib.me.us
- Lithgow Library
- U.S. National Register of Historic Places
- Built: 1894–96
- Architect: Joseph Ladd Neal
- Architectural style: Richardsonian Romanesque
- NRHP reference No.: 74000170
- Added to NRHP: July 24, 1974

The Lithgow Public Library is the public library of Augusta, Maine. Established in 1896, and expanded in 1979 and 2016, it holds about 67,000 books.

== History ==
The library is named for Llewellyn Lithgow, an Augusta merchant, who bequeathed $20,000 to the City of Augusta to build a public library. The building's construction consumed those funds plus a $9,000 gift from Andrew Carnegie, plus money raised through the sale of subscriptions to local citizens. The cornerstone of the library was laid in 1894, and the doors opened to the community in February 1896. The library was added to the National Register of Historic Places in 1974.

== Design ==
Designed in the Romanesque Renaissance style, the library is constructed of gray Norridgewock granite, blocked symmetrically over the windows and entrance. An arched doorway and medallions featuring the names of admired writers adorn the exterior. The building's roof is covered with red clay tiles originally manufactured by the Celadon Terra Cotta Company.

The interior lobby and original stack room feature quartered oak pillars and elaborate woodwork. Grand fireplaces on the east and west walls face each other. Stained glass windows depict printers' marks from the 15th and 16th centuries, as well as several scenes from Augusta history. The Reading Room, with its frescoes, stained glass and gold leaf ornamentation, remains much the same as it was in the 1890s.

== Expansion ==
An addition to the original building was constructed in 1979.

As years passed, water began to leak into the walls between the addition and the original structure. Additionally, the roof needed replacement and there was not enough space for children's programs, forcing library staff to turn children away. There was also no access for patrons with disabilities. Further, the elevator had been described as so old that parts are no longer manufactured for it. An $8.9 million project to expand the library and remedy the above problems, which would have been financed in part by the City of Augusta borrowing $6.9 million, failed in a 2007 referendum by 243 votes.

The Friends of Lithgow Library regularly conduct fundraising to raise funds for a 21st-century expansion and renovation. The proposed project has an estimated cost of $8.1 million, and will be a Public–private partnership between the city of Augusta and the Friends.

By 2014, the cost of the proposed expansion had risen to $11.7 million, due to increased costs since the 2007 referendum. Library officials sought a new referendum vote in June 2014, but some on the Augusta City Council wanted a November vote. Either way, the Friends have $2.7 million of the cost with private money, something not achieved before the 2007 referendum, which was one point cited by its opponents. Augusta City Manager William Bridgeo announced on March 5, 2014, that the proposed bond issue of $7–8 million can be paid for without a tax increase by refinancing an existing bond. He said the refinancing would save enough money to pay for the increased operation costs of a larger facility, such as more staff and increased utility expenses. Library supporters have also said that they may be able to save $1.7 million by trimming the project or alternative funding ideas.

The new referendum vote occurred on June 10, 2014, and the bond issue passed, 2,153-461. It was expected that the project would begin in spring 2015 and take a year or two to complete. Bridgeo said he wanted to ask Hannaford Bros. Co. about leasing a former supermarket building to use as a temporary library during construction. A lease was negotiated with the owners of the former MaineGeneral Medical Center Augusta campus on East Chestnut Street, currently known as the Ballard Center, subject to City Council approval. It provided for a lease of $10.50 per square foot, well below the building's regular rate of $16. The building's owner has said the lease will cover the costs of the library being there and little else, as a contribution to the fundraising campaign.

The library closed for the move to the Ballard Center on April 13, 2015, intending to re-open in mid-May. The library was operated out of the Ballard Center until closing earlier than planned for the move back in August 2016. The construction project continued through the summer, where progress was made in demolishing the addition of the library that had been installed in 1979, revealing a large part of the original exterior that had been hidden for 36 years. Lithgow has contracted a company known as Stained Glass Express to restore and repair many of the library's stained glass windows - which have been since been covered by almost 120 years of dirt and coal residue.

The library held a ribbon-cutting to celebrate the completion of the expansion on August 13, 2016, with its original operating hours resuming on August 15.
