= Pittsburgh Subdivision =

Railway line in Pennsylvania

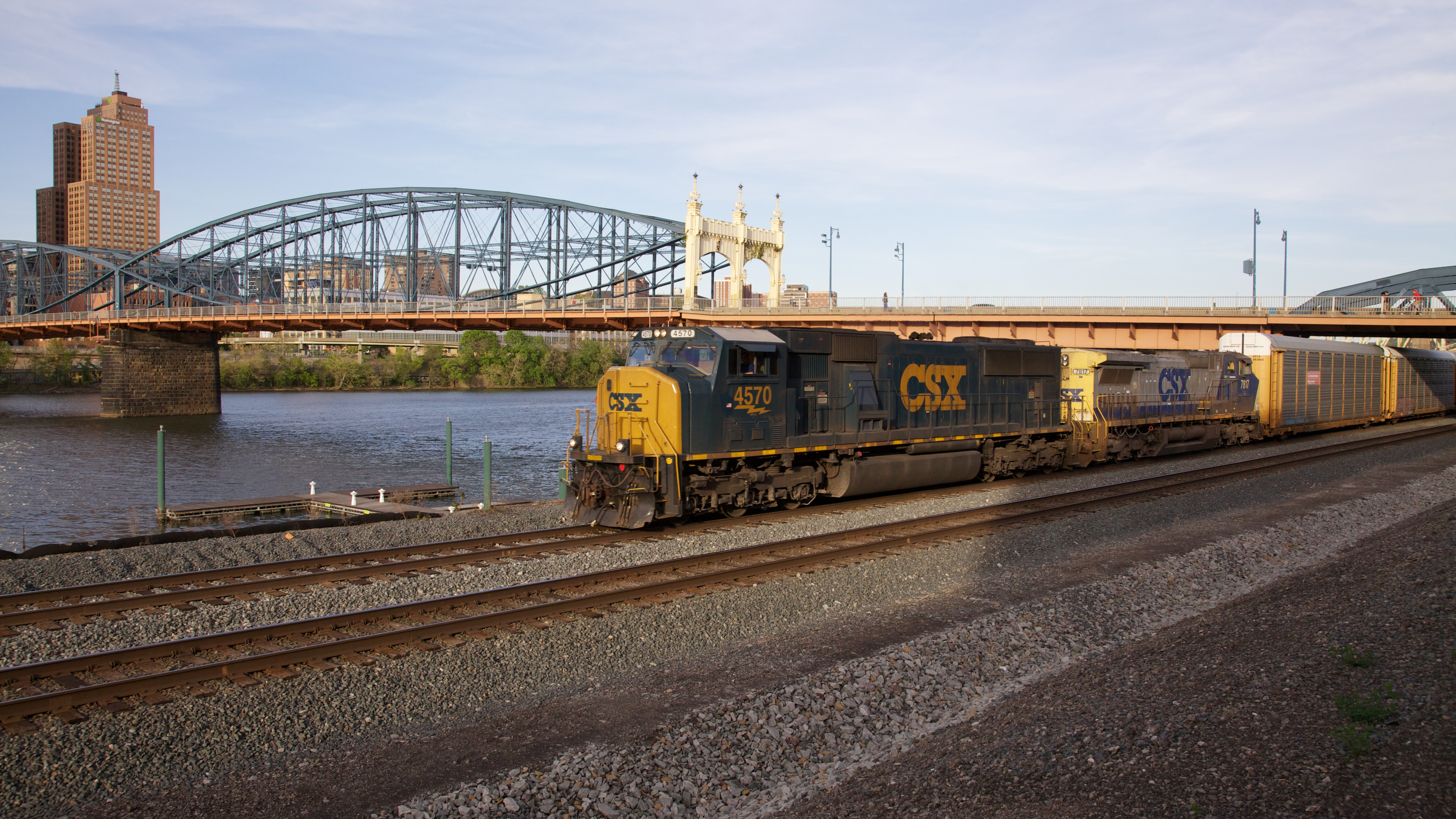
- A CSX freight train passes under the Smithfield Street Bridge in 2013.

Overview
- Status: Operational
- Owner: CSX (from 1993); Pittsburgh and Lake Erie Railroad (until 1993)
- Locale: Western Pennsylvania
- Termini: Sinns, Liberty; West Pittsburg

Service
- Type: Freight rail and passenger rail
- System: CSX
- Operator(s): CSX

History
- Opened: 1879 (northwest of Pittsburgh); 1883 (southeast of Pittsburgh)

Technical
- Line length: 60 mi (97 km)
- Track gauge: 1,435 mm (4 ft 8 1/2 in)

The Pittsburgh Subdivision is an American railroad line that is owned and operated by CSX Transportation in the Commonwealth of Pennsylvania.

== Notable features ==
The line runs from McKeesport (PLY 15.1) northwest through Pittsburgh to West Pittsburg (near New Castle) along a former Pittsburgh and Lake Erie Railroad line. Its east end is at Sinns (PLY 16.9), across the Youghiogheny River from McKeesport at Liberty, at the west end of the Keystone Subdivision. It junctions with the Mon Subdivision at McKeesport, and the P&W Subdivision in Rankin; at its west end it becomes the New Castle Terminal Subdivision.

Amtrak's Capitol Limited uses the line southeast of Rankin.

== History ==
The line northwest of Pittsburgh opened in 1879 as part of the Pittsburgh and Lake Erie Railroad. The rest of the line, southeast from Pittsburgh, was opened in 1883 by the Pittsburgh, McKeesport and Youghiogheny Railroad. The latter company was leased by the P&LE.

In 1934, the Baltimore and Ohio Railroad began operating through trains via trackage rights over the P&LE between McKeesport (slightly north of the current beginning of the Pittsburgh Subdivision until the bridge at Sinns opened in 1968) and New Castle, leaving the P&W Subdivision for local trains only. Eventually the P&LE, which had been jointly owned by CSX and Conrail, was merged into CSX.

== See also ==
- Pittsburgh and Lake Erie Railroad
- List of CSX Transportation lines
