= Youngstown station (New York Central Railroad) =

Station in Ohio, US, demolished 1970s

Youngstown
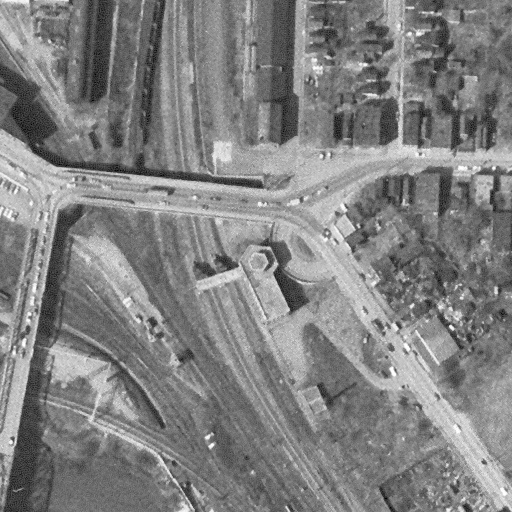
- Aerial photograph of the station in 1970

General information
- Location: Wilson Ave. and Himrod Ave. Youngstown, Ohio; United States
- Coordinates: 41.0956°N 80.6388°W
- Owner: New York Central
- Operator: New York Central

Other information
- Status: Demolished

History
- Opened: 10 November 1926
- Closed: 1 January 1962

Former services
Preceding station	New York Central Railroad	Following station
Doughton toward Ashtabula	Youngstown Branch	Terminus
Youngstown (Erie RR) Terminus	Pittsburgh and Lake Erie Railroad Main Line	West Pittsburg toward Pittsburgh
Youngstown (Erie RR) Terminus	Pittsburgh and Lake Erie Railroad Main Line	Struthers toward Pittsburgh
Location

Youngstown station was a New York Central and Pittsburgh and Lake Erie Railroad (P&LE) railway station in Youngstown, Ohio. It opened for rail service on November 11, 1926. In addition to the passenger and freight operations, the station contained the offices for the Franklin Division of the New York Central.

The station was dedicated on November 10, 1926, by G.H. Ingalls, Vice President of Traffic for the railroad, who presented the station to the mayor of Youngstown, Charles F. Scheible. Other speakers at the dedication included James Anson Campbell, President of Youngstown Sheet and Tube, John Tod, Director of the Mahoning Coal Railroad, and several community members. The station was designed by Fellheimer and Wagner of New York City at a cost of $1,500,000.

The station was approximately one mile north of the next major junction at Center Street, where five Class 1 railroads crossed one another at grade: Erie, P&LE, Pennsylvania, Baltimore and Ohio, and New York Central. This was one of the busiest non-interlocked railroad crossings in the U.S. The crossing was under the control of a switchtender employed by the B&O, who directed all movements with colored flags by day and lanterns by night. It was a statutory stop, so no train moved until the switchtender beckoned him on. This included 16 daily passenger trains operated by the PRR, P&LE, NYC, and B&O. This congestion led to challenges for passenger trains accessing the New York Central station.

Throughout much of its history, the station shared New York Central and P&LE passenger responsibilities with the Erie Terminal, located approximately 1.5 miles further up on the Erie (and then Erie Lackawanna) Main Line. For example, in 1956, the New York Central station saw four daily P&LE trains while the Erie station saw ten. Both the eastbound and westbound Empire Express and the Pittsburgh-Buffalo Express stopped at the New York Central station.

The station was party to several prominent arrivals, including the 1952 Democratic Party nominee for President, Adlai Stevenson, who came through the station on a campaign stop in Youngstown.

The last passenger train departed the station on January 1, 1962. The offices were closed on June 30, 1964, and the New York Central staff moved to new offices at 4005 Hillman Street in Youngstown. It was demolished in the 1970s.

== Station design and layout ==
The station entrance was located on Wilson Avenue, while the platforms and rails were two stories below grade. Access to the tracks was via two sets of stairs that led to platforms. Freight was handled through an access road that led to the track level. The terminal building was rectangular in shape and occupied an area of 120 feet in front with a depth of 50 feet. The building was three stories high.

Three high arches with windows at the main entrance provided lighting to the front of the station. The concourse contained the ticket windows, waiting room, lunch room, newsstand, barber shop, baggage facilities, restrooms, and the entrance to the track crossover. The second floor contained the offices of the Divisional Superintendent and his staff, the wire chief's headquarters, the dispatcher's office, and the telephone exchange.

The baggage room, mail room, and express room were at track level.
