= College Hill (Beaver Falls) =

Human settlement in Pennsylvania, United States

- Neighborhood
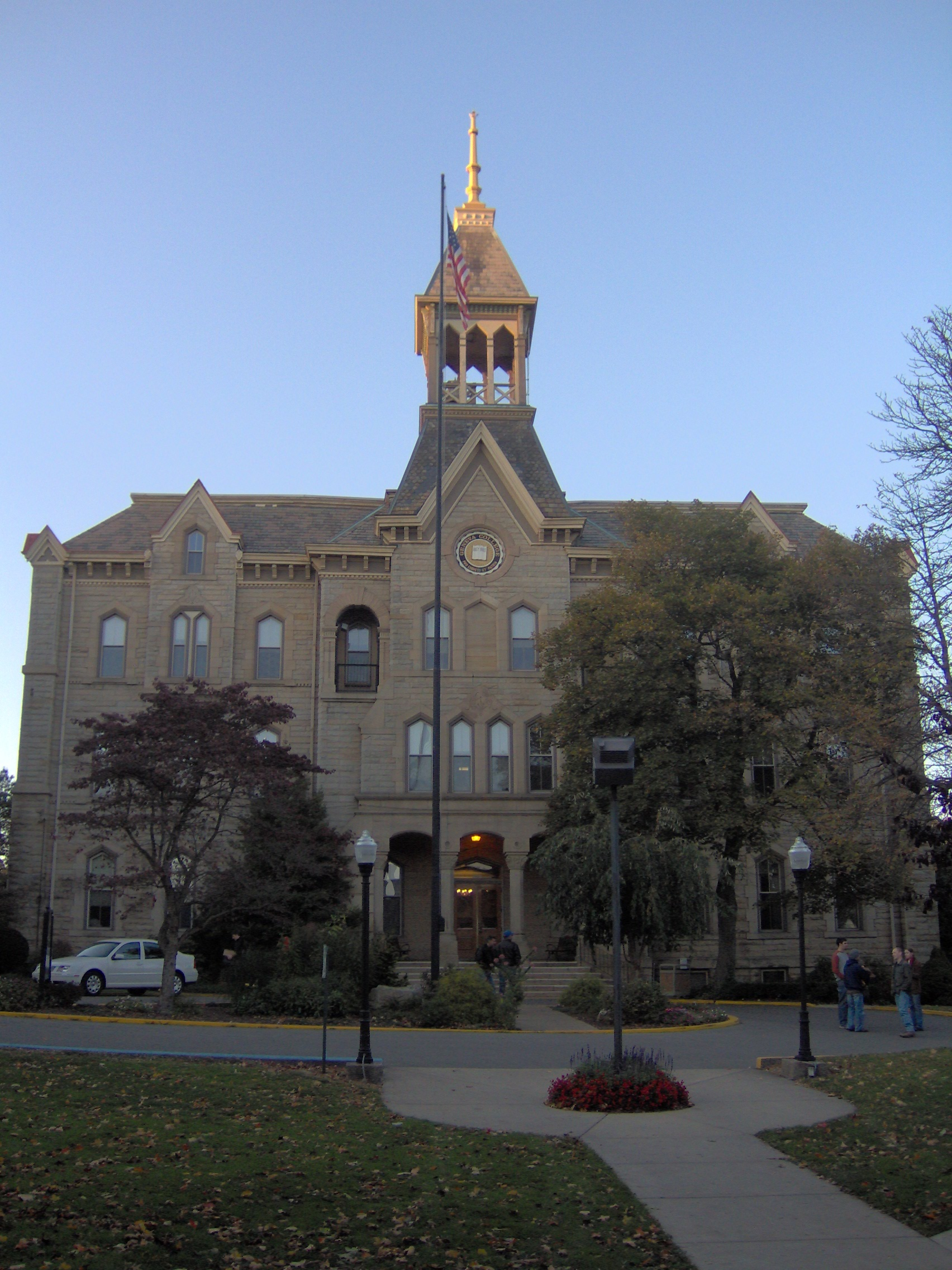
- Geneva College, the neighborhood's namesak

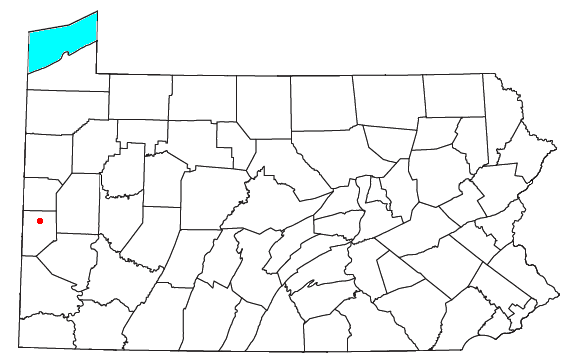
- Location of College Hill in Pennsylvania
- Coordinates: 40°46′40″N 80°19′26″W
- Country: United States
- State: Pennsylvania
- County: Beaver County
- City: Beaver Falls

Population (2000)
  - Total: 3,562

College Hill is a neighborhood located in the northern section of Beaver Falls, Pennsylvania, United States. Geneva College is located in the community, and is the namesake of College Hill.

== History ==
Geneva College was founded in Northwood, Ohio in 1848, but it moved to northern Beaver County in 1880 after being offered free land by the Harmony Society, which was highly influential in Beaver Falls. After the college was established on land just north of Beaver Falls, a community grew up around it, and in 1892, it was incorporated as the borough of College Hill. In 1932, forty years after its incorporation, it merged with Beaver Falls.

As of the 1900 census, College Hill had a population of about 900. Since the 1960s, College Hill has become less of an industrial community than previously; the owner of the former Armstrong Cork factory donated the property to the college, which has since built an athletics complex on the site.

At the 2000 census, College Hill had a population of 3,562 residents, more than one-third of the city's total population of 9,920. Although the population had declined by 78 residents since the 1990 census, or about 2.14% of its total, College Hill fared better than the rest of the city, which lost 767 residents, or about 7.18% of its population, during the same time.

== Geography ==
College Hill is centered at 40°46′40″N 80°19′26″W (40.7778426, -80.3239521), at an altitude of 899 feet (274 m). It is about 1.5 minutes north of and 98 feet (30 m) higher than central Beaver Falls.

== Transportation ==
Pennsylvania Route 18 is the main road through College Hill and provides access to the rest of Beaver Falls in the south and to the Pennsylvania Turnpike in the north. Pennsylvania Routes 251 and 551 also pass through the community. Between 1910 and 1985, the College Hill Station provided rail transportation for the residents, but is now abandoned.
