= West Pittsburg, Pennsylvania =

Unincorporated community in Pennsylvania, US

- Census-designated place
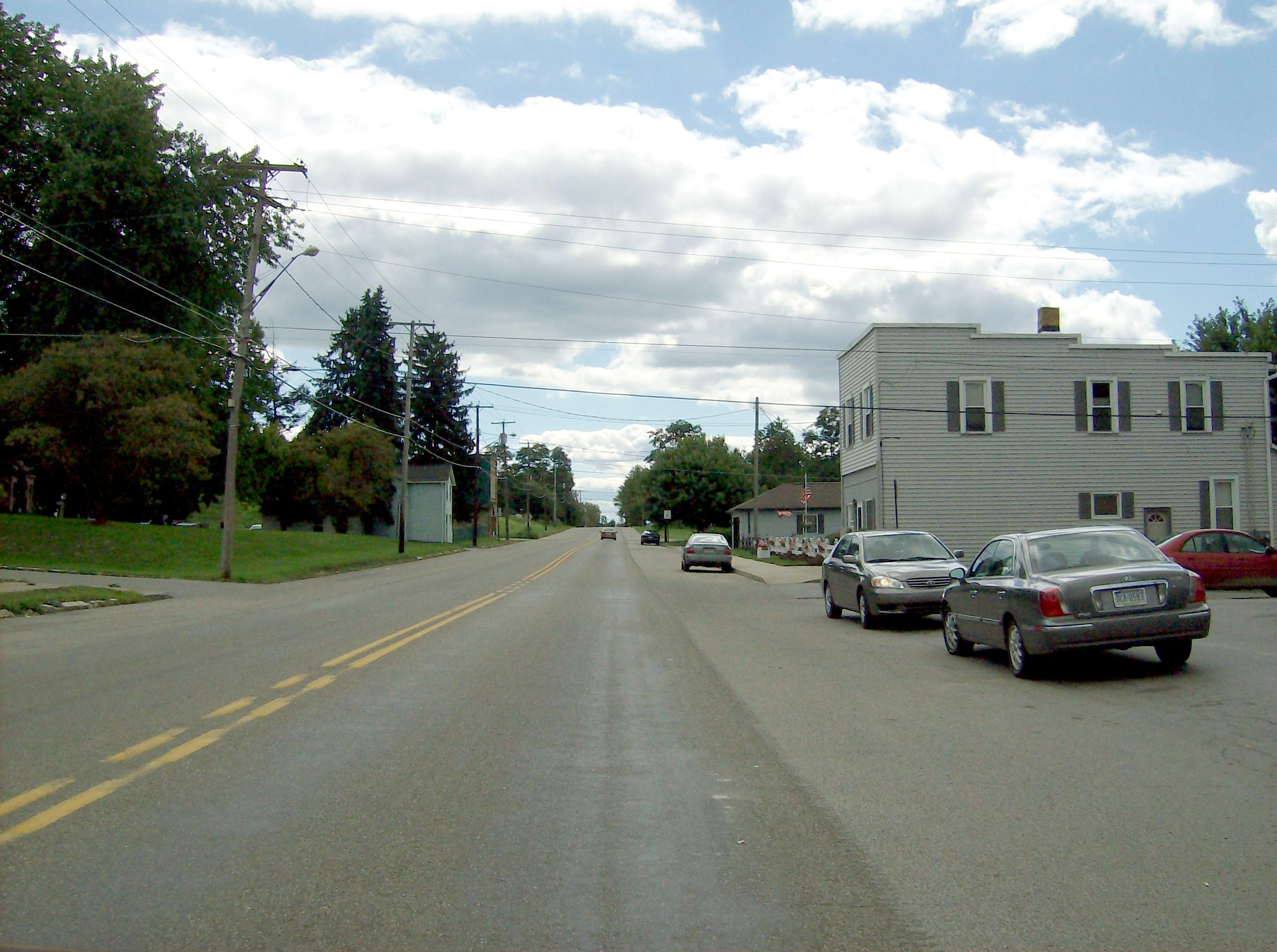
- Main Street in downtown West Pittsburg

- Location in Pennsylvania Location in the United States
- Coordinates: 40°55′58″N 80°21′48″W
- Country: United States
- State: Pennsylvania
- County: Lawrence
- Township: Taylor

Area
  - Total: 0.69 sq mi (1.78 km^{2})
  - Land: 0.69 sq mi (1.78 km^{2})
  - Water: 0 sq mi (0.0 km^{2})
- Elevation: 842 ft (257 m)

Population (2010)
  - Total: 808
  - Density: 1,178/sq mi (454.8/km^{2})
- Time zone: UTC-5 (EST)
  - Summer (DST): UTC-4 (EDT)
- ZIP code: 16160
- Area code: 724
- GNIS feature ID: 2633816

West Pittsburg is an unincorporated community and census-designated place (CDP) in southern Taylor Township, Lawrence County, Pennsylvania, United States. As of the 2010 census it had a population of 808.

It is located in the Beaver River valley 5 miles (8 km) south of New Castle. Its main street is the north–south Pennsylvania Route 168, which crosses the river at the southern end of the community.

The community is 46 miles (74 km) north-northwest of the city of Pittsburgh.

== West Pittsburg P&LE Station ==
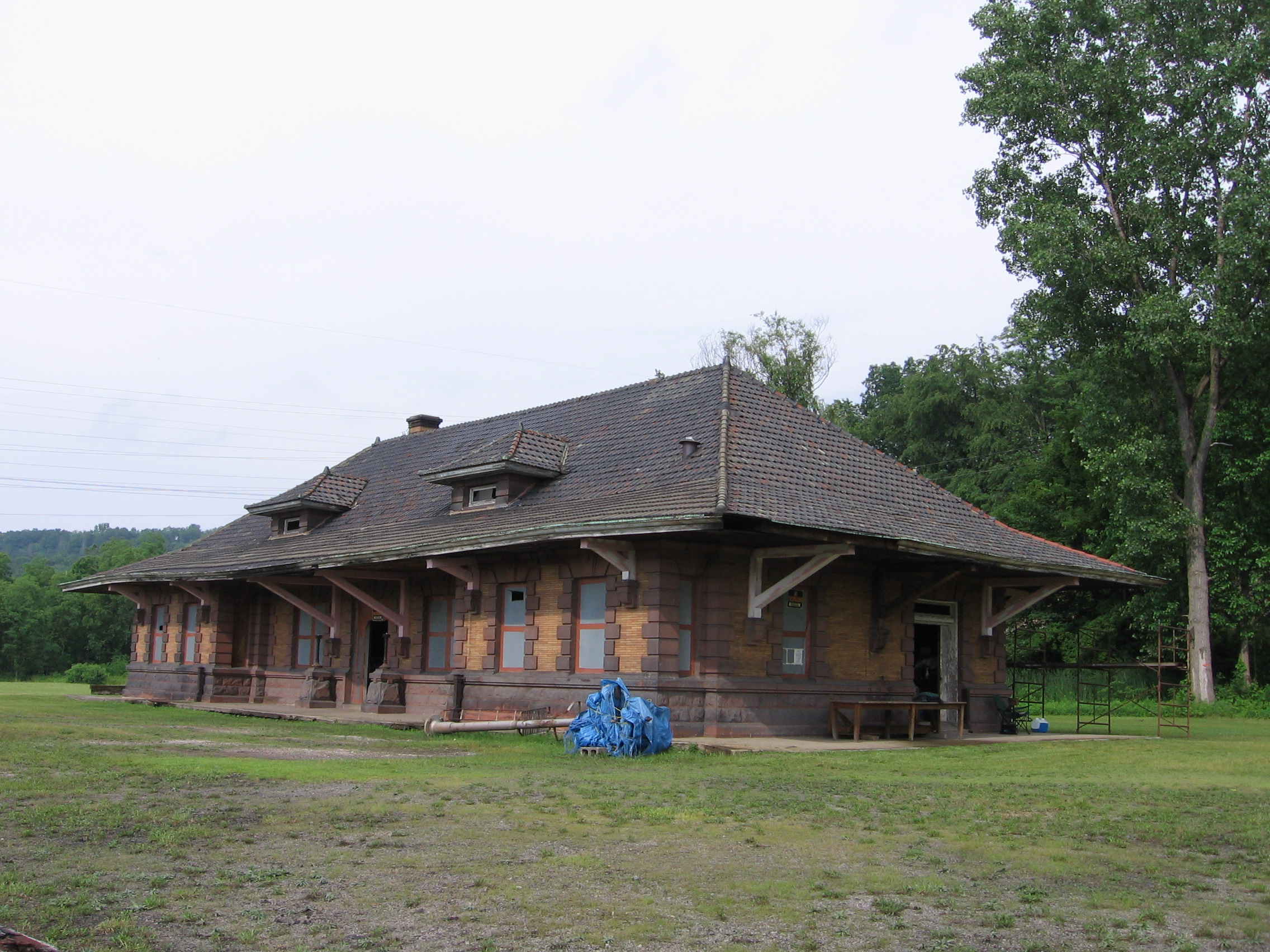
West Pittsburg Station

For a small community, West Pittsburg had one of the largest railroad stations built in the north Pittsburgh area. At one time, the Pittsburgh and Lake Erie Railroad thought that the community would become a major railroad hub and constructed a large railroad station that would serve passengers on "The Little Giant".

Other railroads that would have benefited were the Baltimore and Ohio Railroad and the Western Allegheny Railroad; however, the hub never materialized. Over time, the three railroads went out of business, but CSX Transportation and the Buffalo and Pittsburgh Railroad continue to use the yard near the West Pittsburg Station to transport freight to cities like Pittsburgh, Butler, Cleveland, New Castle, and Youngstown.
