= Pittsburgh & Lake Erie Railroad Station =

Historic building in Pittsburgh

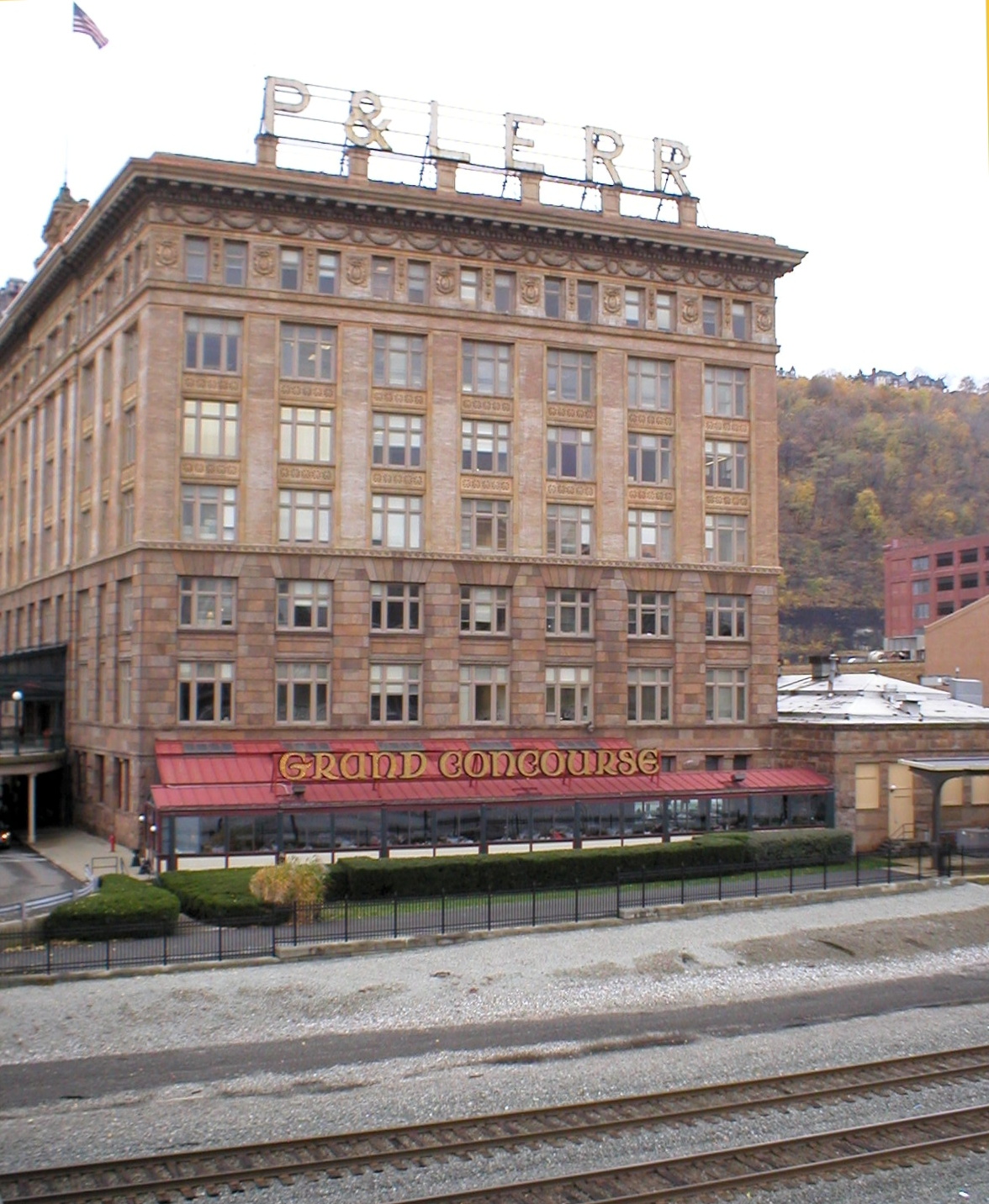
- Pittsburgh & Lake Erie Railroad Station, April 2007

General information
- Line: Pittsburgh Subdivision

History
- Opened: 1898
- Closed: July 12, 1985

Former services
Preceding station	Baltimore and Ohio Railroad	Following station
Mars toward Chicago	Main Line	Connellsville toward Jersey City
Millvale toward Chicago	Main Line	Braddock toward Jersey City
Hazelwood toward Cincinnati	Cincinnati – Pittsburgh	Terminus
Terminus	Buffalo, Rochester and Pittsburgh Railway	Ribold Junction toward Buffalo
Preceding station	New York Central Railroad	Following station
Coraopolis toward Youngstown	Pittsburgh and Lake Erie Railroad Main Line	Terminus
McKee's Rocks toward Youngstown	Pittsburgh and Lake Erie Railroad Main Line	Terminus
Terminus	Pittsburgh – Brownsville	22nd Street toward Brownsville
Terminus	Youghiogheny Branch	South Side toward Connellsville
- Pittsburgh & Lake Erie Railroad Station
- U.S. National Register of Historic Places
- City of Pittsburgh Historic Structure
- Pittsburgh Landmark – PHLF
- Location within Pittsburgh Location within Pennsylvania Location within the United States
- Location: Smithfield St. at Carson St., Pittsburgh, Pennsylvania
- Coordinates: 40°26′1″N 80°0′14″W
- Area: less than one acre
- Built: 1898
- Architect: Burns, William George
- Architectural style: Classical Revival, Edwardian
- NRHP reference No.: 74001743

Significant dates
- Added to NRHP: January 11, 1974
- Designated CPHS: March 15, 1974
- Designated PHLF: 1970
Location

The Pittsburgh & Lake Erie Railroad Station, now Landry's Grand Concourse restaurant in Station Square Plaza in Pittsburgh, Pennsylvania, is an historic building that was erected in 1898. It was listed on the National Register of Historic Places in 1974.

== History ==
The Pittsburgh & Lake Erie Railroad Station served as the depot for the passenger rail operations of the Pittsburgh & Lake Erie Railroad and the Pittsburgh depot from 1934 into the 1960s. Many of the trains making stops here were trains of the Baltimore and Ohio Railroad, which were making their way to Pittsburgh from Baltimore, Washington, Chicago, Detroit, and St. Louis.

In 1934, the B&O obtained trackage rights on the P&LE from New Castle Junction to McKeesport and, until the discontinuance of its passenger service, used the P&LE station to reduce the amount of heavy-curvature trackage required to reach the original B&O station on the opposite side of the Monongahela River.

The station closed in 1985 after the last commuter train to College Hill station was discontinued.

The Pittsburgh Station was listed on the National Register of Historic Places in 1974.

== Long distance passenger trains ==
Noteworthy named trains of the B&O included in 1956:

- Ambassador (Detroit–Baltimore)
- Capitol Limited (Chicago–Washington)
- Cleveland Night Express (Cleveland–Baltimore)
- Columbian (Chicago–Washington)
- Shenandoah (Chicago–Jersey City)
- Washington–Chicago Express (Chicago–Washington)
- Washingtonian (Cleveland–Washington)

P&LE trains operating as New York Central trains:

- Pittsburgh–Buffalo Express (Pittsburgh–Erie–Buffalo, with sleepers to Toronto and Albany, eastbound)/Buffalo–Pittsburgh Express (Buffalo–Erie–Pittsburgh with sleepers from Toronto and Albany, westbound)
- Pittsburgh–Detroit Express (Pittsburgh–Detroit, westbound only)
- Steel King (Cleveland–Pittsburgh, with sleepers to Washington via the B&O's Washingtonian)

== Gallery ==
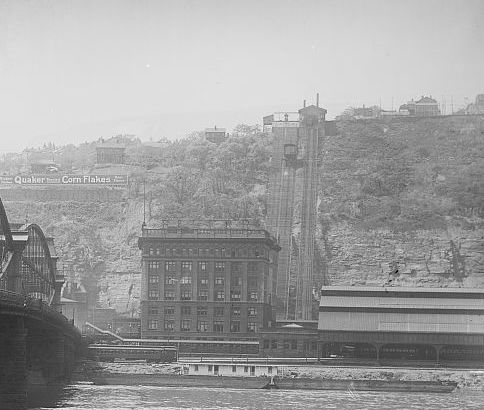
The Pittsburgh & Lake Erie Railroad Station, c.1905

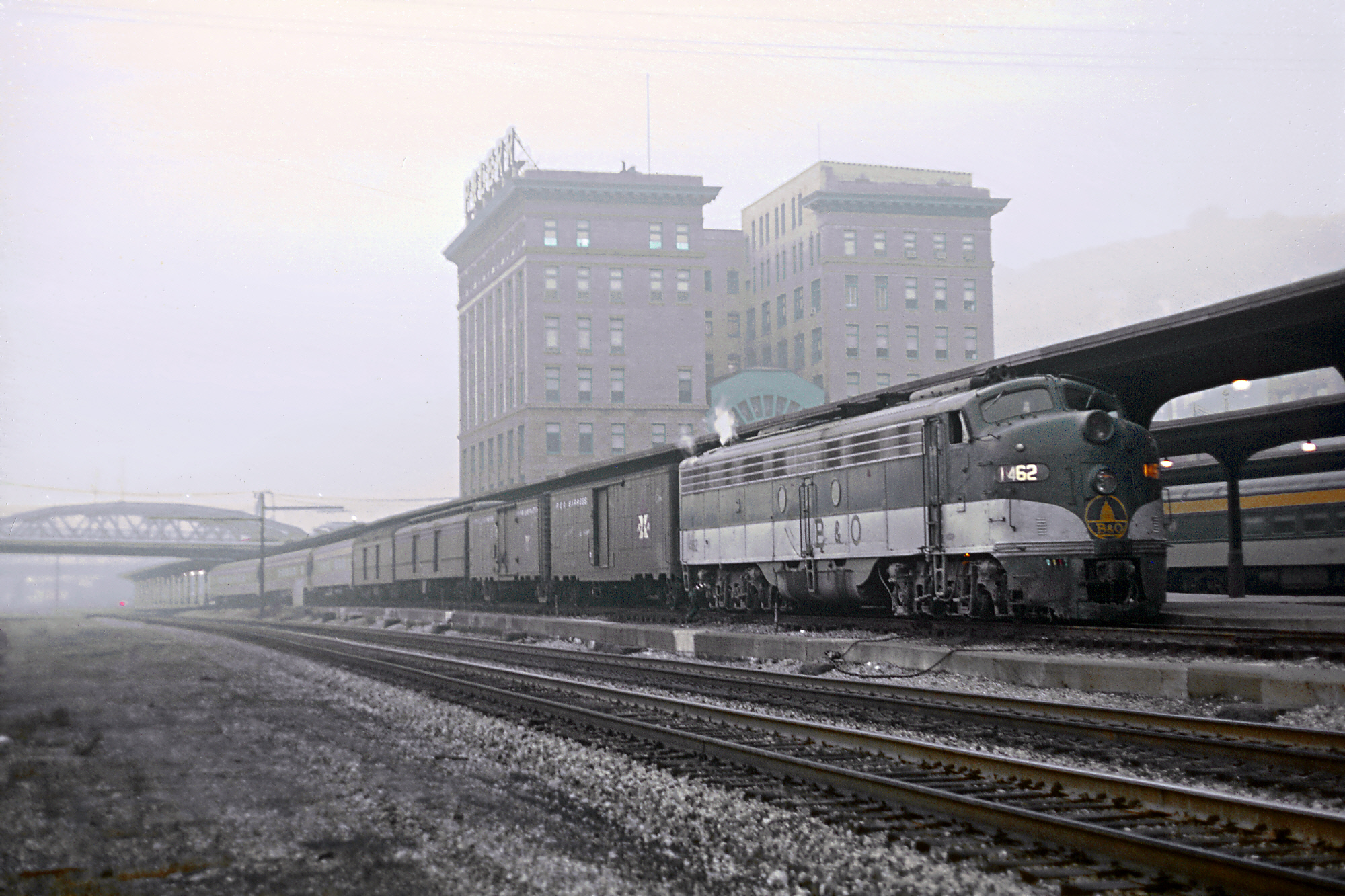
B&O's Diplomat at the P&LE Station c.1968

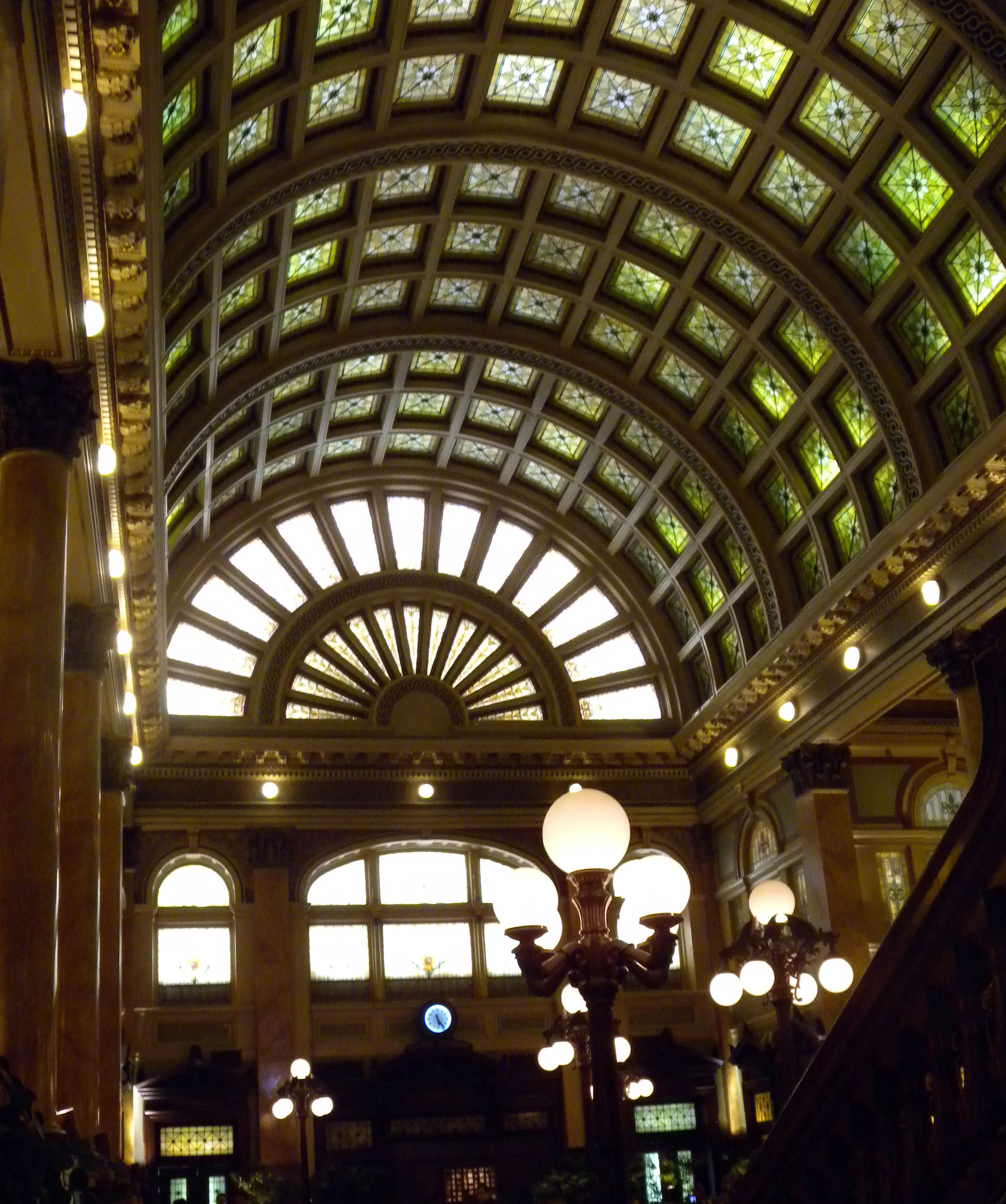
Inside the station concourse

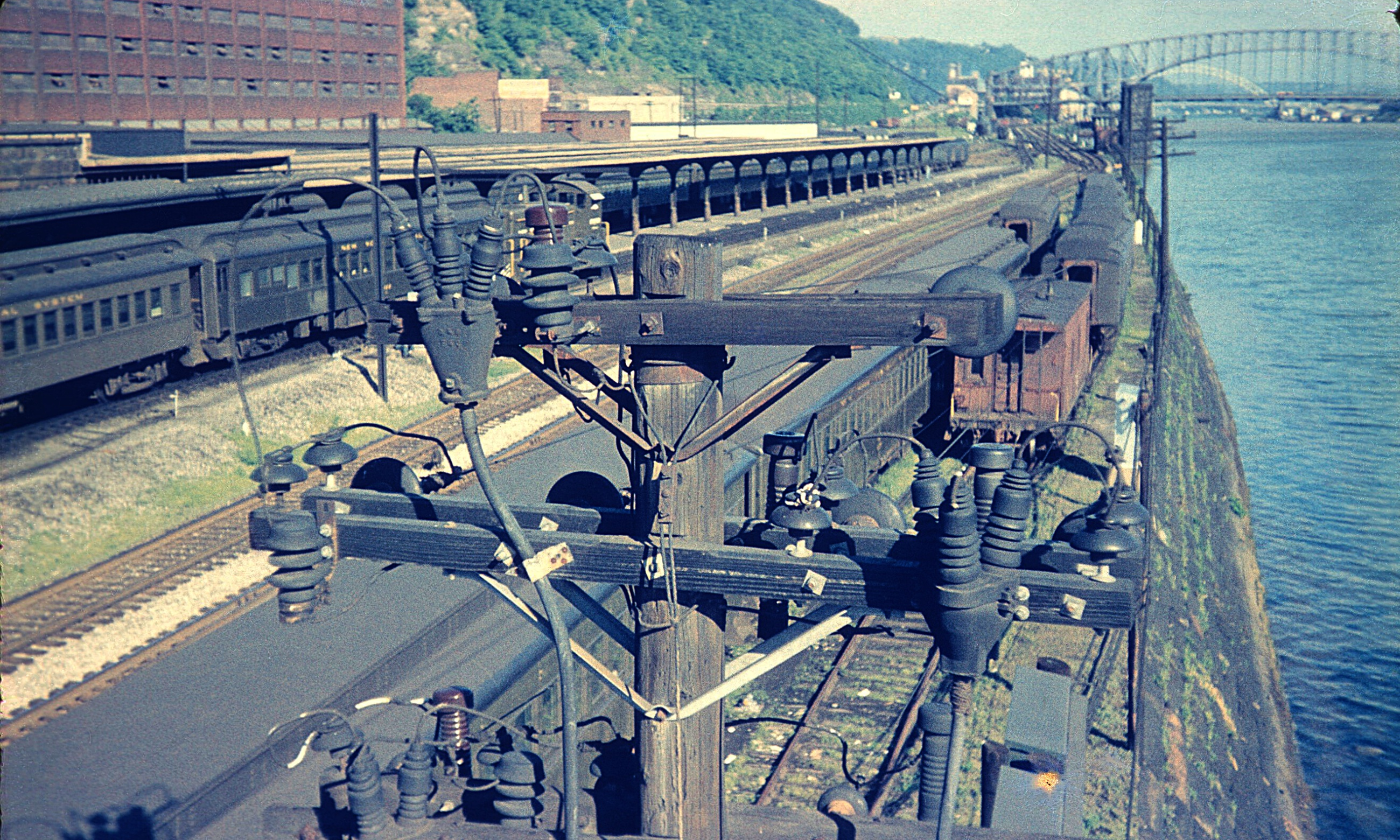
Station Square area of the Monongahela River showing the back of P&LE Railroad Station 1951.

== See also ==
- Grant Street Station
- Union Station (Pittsburgh)
- Wabash Pittsburgh Terminal
- Baltimore and Ohio Station (Pittsburgh)
