= Pittsburgh and Lake Erie Railroad =

Defunct railroad in Pennsylvania and Ohio

- Pittsburgh and Lake Erie Railroad (red) and New York Central system (orange) as of 1918

Overview
- Headquarters: Pittsburgh, Pennsylvania
- Reporting mark: PLE
- Locale: Pittsburgh, Pennsylvania to Youngstown, Ohio; Pittsburgh, Pennsylvania to Connellsville, Pennsylvania
- Dates of operation: 1875–1993
- Successor: CSX

Technical
- Track gauge: 4 ft 8 1/2 in (1,435 mm) standard gauge

The Pittsburgh and Lake Erie Railroad (P&LE; reporting mark PLE), also known as the "Little Giant", was a railroad. It was formed on May 11, 1875. In 1889 New York Central Railroad took ownership of the railroad and ran it as a separate operation. In 1969, with the merger of New York Central and Pennsylvania, the P&LE became an independent with its company headquarters located in Pittsburgh, Pennsylvania. The line connected Pittsburgh in the east with Youngstown, Ohio, in the Haselton neighborhood in the west and Connellsville, Pennsylvania, to the east. It did not reach Lake Erie until 1914 (at Ashtabula, Ohio) The P&LE was known as the "Little Giant" since the tonnage that it moved was out of proportion to its route mileage. While it operated around one tenth of one percent of the nation's railroad miles, it hauled around one percent of its tonnage. This was largely because the P&LE served the steel mills of the greater Pittsburgh area, which consumed and shipped vast amounts of materials. It was a specialized railroad, deriving much of its revenue from coal, coke, iron ore, limestone, and steel. The eventual closure of the steel mills led to the end of the P&LE as an independent line in 1992 when CSX Transportation (CSX) bought it.

At the end of 1970 P&LE operated 211 miles (340 km) of road on 784 miles (1,262 km) of track, not including PC&Y and Y&S; in 1970 it reported 1419 million ton-miles of revenue freight, down from 2437 million in 1944.

== Route of the P&LE ==
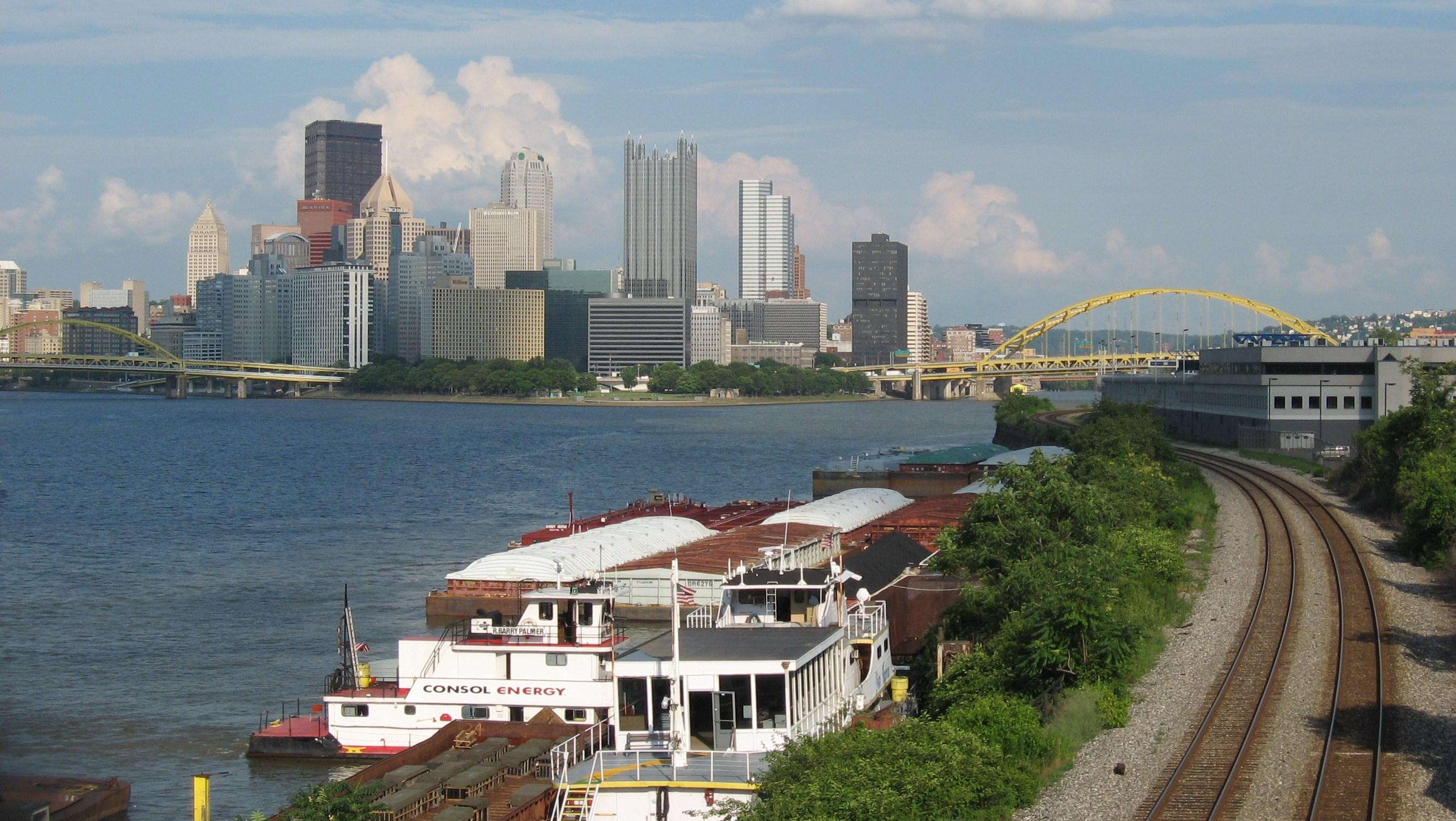
Former P&LE trackage

The P&LE purchased many smaller railroads that operated in the areas of its main train line extending the line north to Youngstown and south to Connellsville. This provided a means of transportation from the steel centers of Pittsburgh to the Great Lakes and St. Lawrence Seaway area.

=== P&LE Division ===
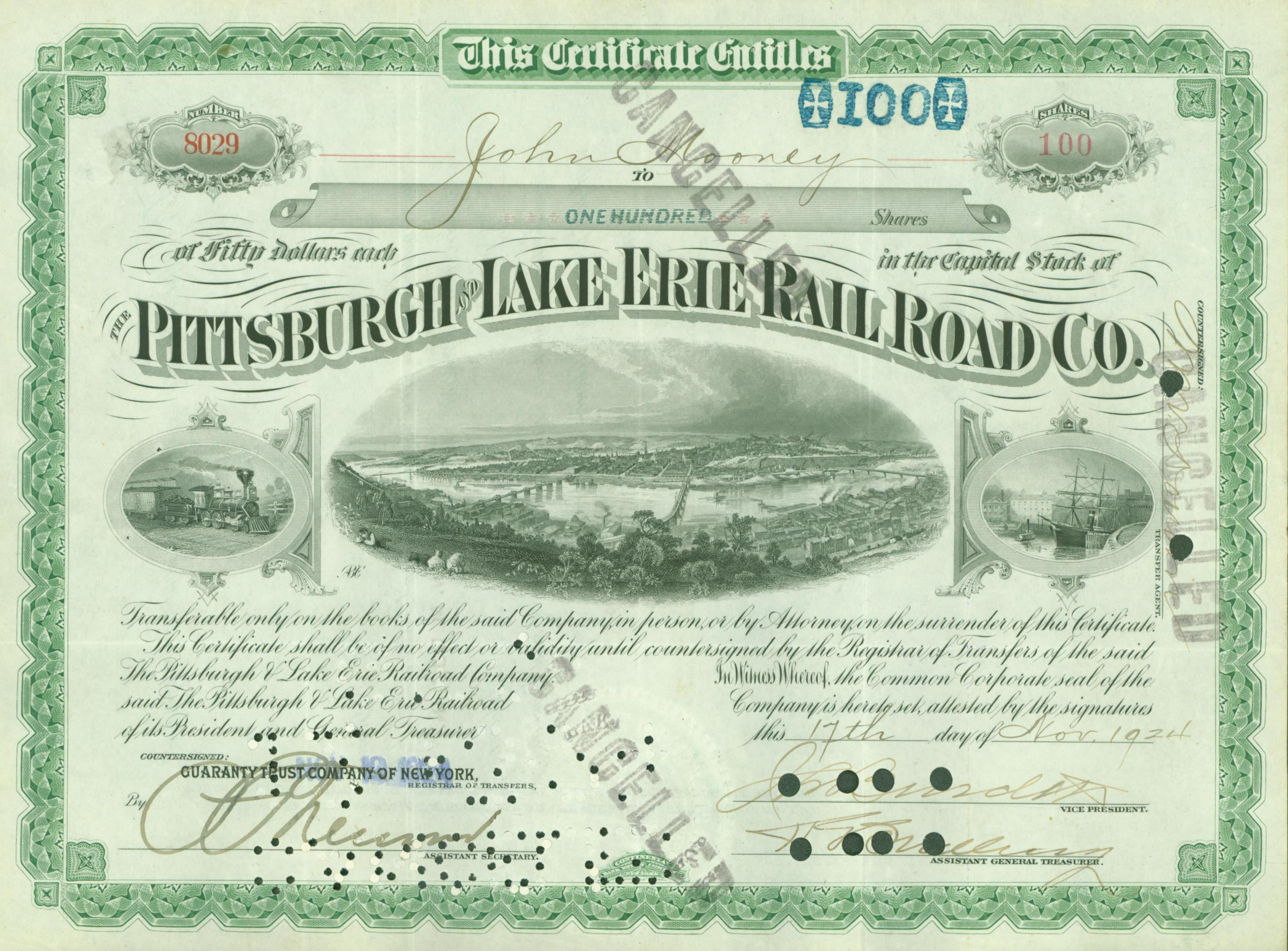
Share of the Pittsburgh and Lake Erie Rail Road Company, issued 17 November 1924

The original line ran between Youngstown, Ohio (at Haselton) and 24th Street in Pittsburgh, Pennsylvania near the Jones and Laughlin Iron Works, opened in 1879. The P&LE's passenger terminal in Pittsburgh was on the south bank of the Monongahela River, at the foot of the Smithfield Street Bridge.

The P&LE followed the left downstream bank of the Monongahela River past the terminal to the Golden Triangle, where that waterway meets the Allegheny River and becomes the Ohio River. The railroad continued northwest along the left downstream bank of the Ohio River to the vicinity of Beaver, Pennsylvania, where it crossed the river on the Beaver Bridge. From there it followed the Beaver River to just south of New Castle, Pennsylvania, where it then followed the Mahoning River west-northwest, crossing into Ohio just east of Lowellville. From there it ran northwest into Youngstown, terminating at a junction with the New York Central known as Haselton.

In the table below, mileage is reckoned westbound from the P&LE Terminal in Pittsburgh. The original line continued east past that station for a little over two miles (3.2 km) (listed in Youghiogheny Branch table below) to near 24th Street in the South Side Flats neighborhood of Pittsburgh, where it met the Monongahela Connecting Railroad and the Pittsburgh, McKeesport & Youghiogheny (PM&Y).

State	Milepost	City	Station	Lat/long	Old Telegraph Call Letters	Connections and notes
OH			Youngstown (Erie)			
OH	64		Youngstown (New York Central)			Interchange With NYC
OH		Youngstown	Youngstown (Haselton)			Interchange With Baltimore and Ohio Railroad
OH	60	Struthers	Struthers			JCT for LE&E and Y&S
OH			Lowellville Junction			
OH	56	Lowellville	Lowellville			
PA		Robinson	Robinson			
PA	52		Edinburg			
PA			Coverts-Crossing			
PA	48	New Castle	New Castle (Mahoningtown)			Interchange with Baltimore and Ohio Railroad
PA			New Castle Junction			Branch to New Castle
PA		West Pittsburg	West Pittsburg Station			B&O Trackage Rights over P&LE to Port Vue
PA		Newport	Newport			
PA	41	Wampum	Wampum			
PA			Rock Point			
PA	36		West Ellwood Junction Station			Branch to Ellwood City
PA		Beaver Falls (College Hill)	College Hill Station			College Yard
PA		Beaver Falls	Beaver Falls			
PA		New Brighton	New Brighton			
PA		Fallston	Fallston			
PA		Beaver	Bridgewater			
PA		Beaver & Monaca	Beaver Bridge over Ohio River			
PA	24	Monaca	Monaca			
PA		Aliquippa	West Aliquippa			
PA	20	Aliquippa	Aliquippa			
PA	18	Economy	West Economy Station			
PA	16	South Heights	South Heights Station			
PA	15	Glenwillard	Glenwillard			
PA	14	Crescent Twp	Stoops Ferry			
PA	11	Moon Twp	Kendall			
PA	9	Coraoplis	Coraopolis			Interchange With Montour
PA	8	Robinson Twp	Montour Junction Station			Montour Trackage Rights over P&LE to Coraopolis
PA	4	McKees Rocks	McKees Rocks			Yard, Locomotive, Freight Car Shops and Maintenance. JCT with PC&Y.
PA	2	Pittsburgh (West End). Interchange with P&WV	West End			
PA	0	Pittsburgh	P&LE Pittsburgh Terminal			Pittsburgh Terminal and Smithfield Street Bridge

=== Youghiogheny Branch ===
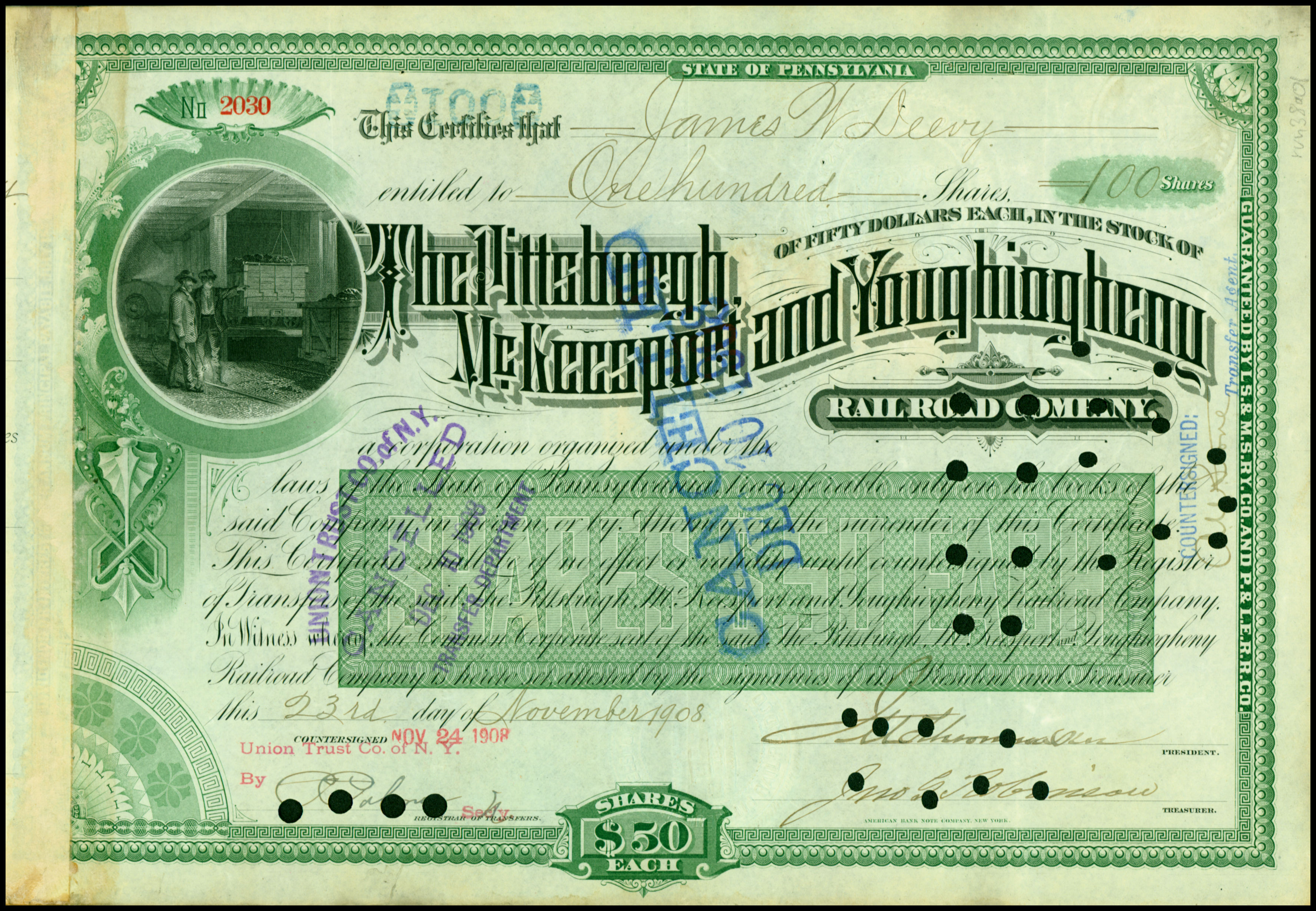
Share of the Pittsburgh, McKeesport & Youghiogheny Railroad Company, issued 23. November 1908

The Pittsburgh, McKeesport and Youghiogheny Railroad ran from 24th Street in Pittsburgh, PA to Connellsville, Pennsylvania, in 1882. The PM&Y followed the Monongahela River to McKeesport, Pennsylvania, then the Youghiogheny River to Connellsville, Pennsylvania.

Mileage on this P&LE branch was reckoned from the passenger terminal back at the Smithfield Street Bridge.

State	Milepost	City	Station	Lat/long	Connections and notes
PA	0	Pittsburgh	P&LE Pittsburgh Terminal		Original route of the Pittsburgh and Beck's Run Railroad (start)
PA		Pittsburgh	South Side		20th Street & 24th Street junctions: Interchange with MCRR
PA	4	Pittsburgh	Williamsburg		
PA	5	Pittsburgh	Becks Run		End of Pittsburgh and Becks Run Railroad
PA	6	Homestead	Homestead		Site of Homestead Strike
PA		Munhall			P&LE Munhall Bridge over Monongahela River
PA	8	Rankin	Rankin		
PA	10	Braddock	Braddock		
PA	11	McKeesport	McKeesport		Bridge over Youghiogheny River
PA	16	Port Vue	Port Vue		Interchange With B&O. B&O had trackage rights over P&LE to West Pittsburgh.
PA	17	Port Vue	Sinn		
PA	18	Dead Man's Hollow	Flemming		Industrial single ended siding at the Union Sewer Pipe Company
PA	19		Boston		
PA	22		Greenock		
PA	25	Stringtown	Dravo		Site of Methodist church that caught fire due to sparks of passing trains.
PA	27	Buena Vista	Buena Vesta		
PA	33		West Newton		
PA	37		Cedar Creek		
PA	41		Wickhaven		
PA	46		Kier		
PA	49		Sand Rock		
PA	53		Dickerson Run		
PA	56		Crossland		
PA	58	Connellsville	Connellsville		Interchange With B&O, WM, and NW

=== Monongahela Branch ===
The Pittsburgh, McKeesport & Youghiogheny Railroad also followed the Monongahela River to Brownsville, Pennsylvania.

State	Milepost	City	Station	Lat/long	Old Telegraph Call Letters	Connections and notes
PA	16	Port Vue	Belle Vernon Junction			
PA	18	Glassport	Glassport			
PA	20		Pollock			
PA	22	Elizabeth	Wylie Elizabeth			
PA	27		Bunola			
PA	31	East Monongahela	Monongahela			
PA	33		Manown			
PA	34		Sunnyside			
PA	36		Sheppler			
PA	40	Monessen	Monessen			
PA	42		East Charleroi			
PA	43		Belle Vernon			
PA	45	Fayette City	Fayette City			
PA	50		Newell			
PA	54		Brownsville Junction			JCT with Monongahela Railway

== History ==
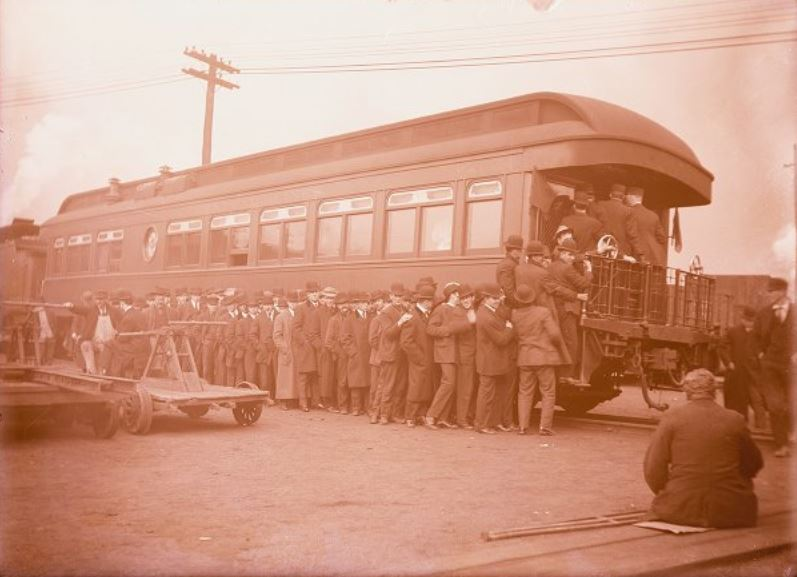
View of men in line at the pay car of the Pittsburgh and Lake Erie Railroad Company

The Pittsburgh and Lake Erie Railroad was the creation of William McCreery, a prominent Pittsburgh businessman, merchant, and railroad builder. McCreery had suffered at the hands of the Pennsylvania Railroad in a business that had a loss or failed. The Pennsylvania Railroad at the time used discriminatory rates which became a hot issue in Pittsburgh. On May 11, 1870 McCreery and ten other people filed Articles of Association with the Pennsylvania Secretary of State. The stated length of the railroad was for 57 miles (92 km). After 2 years the starting group was not very successful at raising the required funds and in 1877 many of the directors were succeeded by a new group of Pittsburgh businessmen. The new group was James I. Bennett, David Hostetter, James M. Baily, Mark W. Watson and James M. Schoonmaker, all influential.

In the spring of 1877, the first rails were laid down in Beaver Falls, which had the largest population other than Pittsburgh. The other reason for this was around February 1877 Jacob Henrici of the Harmony Society had business there. Henrici would also become a director in 1877. On July 6, 1877, McCreery resigned and Bennett was elected to president with Jacob Henrici becoming a director. Henrici was the key due to his Harmony Society ties which was a communal religious group founded in 1805. In 1880, William Henry Vanderbilt's Lake Shore and Michigan Southern Railway bought stock to the tune of $200,000 in the P&LE. The P&LE would stay in the Vanderbilt's New York Central system until Conrail. Also in 1877, an agreement between the P&LE and the Atlantic & Great Western (Erie) and the Lake Shore and Michigan Southern Railway was reached for routing traffic at Youngstown, Ohio. The final track laying between Pittsburgh and Youngstown was on January 27, 1879. At the opening in 1879, the P&LE was a poorly built, single track line. Fortunately for the railroad it was an immediate success and money was soon available for improvements.

=== South Penn and Pittsburgh, McKeesport and Youghiogheny Railroad ===
In 1881, the P&LE became linked with the notorious South Pennsylvania Railroad (South Penn). This would lead to William Henry Vanderbilt to control of the P&LE as a link in the South Penn and the building of the Pittsburgh, McKeesport and Youghiogheny Railroad. The South Pennsylvania Railroad was planned to connect to the PM&Y. Vanderbilt did this by buying Henry W. Oliver's and the Harmony Society's stock in the P&LE. Then Vanderbilt, aided by Andrew Carnegie, advanced the PM&Y all of the funds to build to Connellsville, Pennsylvania and then lease it to the P&LE for 99 years. The PM&Y in the end was the only part of the South Penn that was built, but it would be an important part of the P&LE. The PM&Y opened in 1883 and leased to the P&LE in 1884. Concurrently in 1883, to get the P&LE ready for the expected new business due to the South Penn linkage, the McKees Rocks shops were built.

=== Vanderbilt and the "Little Giant" ===
The company came under more formal control in 1887 by the New York Central Railroad. Lake Shore and Michigan Southern Railway's president, John Newell, took over as president of the P&LE in 1887. Under Newell, Reed and Colonel Schoonmaker; the P&LE would become the "Little Giant". From 1887 to 1927, the P&LE would become a heavy duty railroad, with double track all the way from Pittsburgh to Youngstown. The P&LE operated as an independent subsidiary, even after New York Central and Pennsylvania Railroad merged to form Penn Central.

=== PM&Y and the Monongahela Railway ===
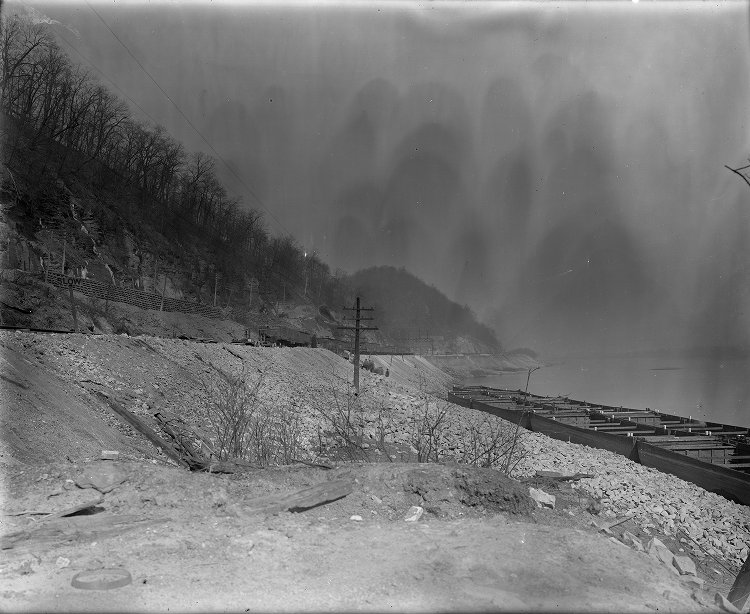
Pittsburgh and Lake Erie Railroad in Stoops Ferry, Pennsylvania, 1907

The making of coke in Connellsville had been a big part of P&LE traffic, but by the early 20th century it had lessened. The development of by-products distillation processing of coke had moved to the Pittsburgh area. The P&LE then extended up the Monongahela River to Brownsville, Pennsylvania in 1901. The Pennsylvania Railroad at the same time had extended to Brownsville. Both the PRR and the P&LE had plans to extend even further up the river into West Virginia coke fields. Most likely due to the South Penn, they decided to work together by using the Monongahela Railway. The Monongahela Railway then was extended south to Martin, Pennsylvania reaching the Kondike Coke fields. Later in 1915 it reached Fairmont, West Virginia.

=== Conrail and CSX ===
When Conrail was formed, the Pittsburgh and Lake Erie Railroad again became an independent company because P&LE was owed $15.2 million by Penn Central, and operated as such until its merger into CSX Transportation (CSX).

Starting in 1934, the Baltimore and Ohio Railroad (B&O) bought trackage rights over P&LE from McKeesport to New Castle. The B&O's route through Pittsburgh had excessive grades and curves. In the last years of the P&LE, CSX used the line more than P&LE leading to the merger. Most of the online customers had long been gone, with only the main line still intact. In 1993 the company was purchased by CSX. The CSX designated the P&LE as a new subsidiary, the Three Rivers Railway. However, in 1993, CSX leased the TRR, and there is currently no de facto distinction between the former P&LE and any other portion of CSX's system.

The portion of the P&LE main line from New Castle, PA to Youngstown, OH has been abandoned and removed in favor of the parallel B&O line.

== Company officers ==
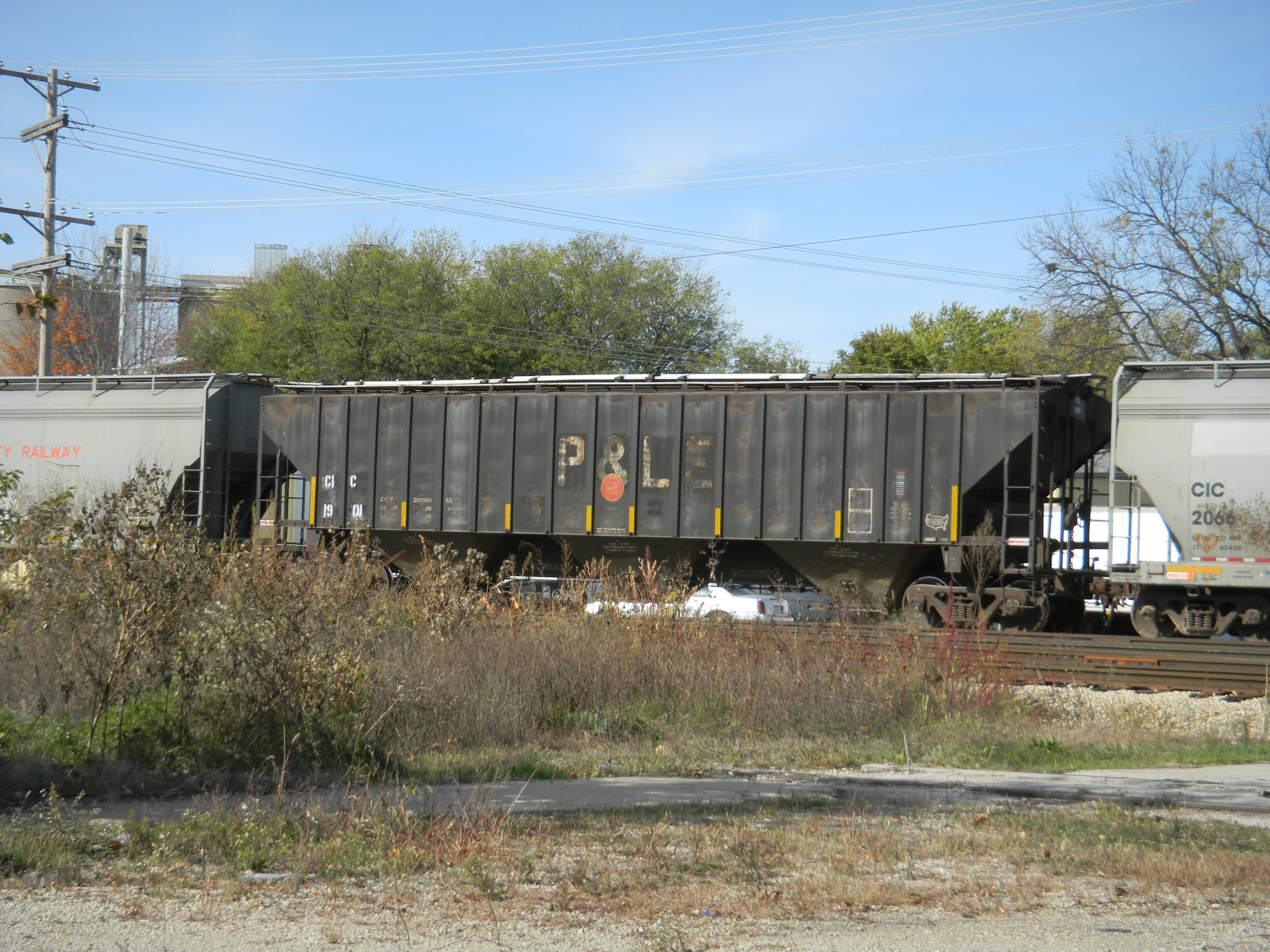
P&LE hopper with CRANDIC markings on the CRANDIC at Cedar Rapids, Iowa. Note ACI plate on the car.

Presidents of the railroad were as follows:

- William McCreery 1875-1877
- James I. Bennett 1877-1881
- Jacob Henrici 1877-1885
- John Newell 1887-1896

After Newell the presidency would be held by the president of the NYC with the active management of the local vice president.

Vice Presidents:

- James H. Reed 1892-1896
- Colonel James M. Schoonmaker 1886-1927
- James B. Yohe 1917-1919 WW1 Supervisor 1920-1929 V.P.
- Curtis M. Yohe 1929-1953
- John F. Nash 1953-1956

With Nash the active management went back to the president.

- John W. Barriger III 1956-1964
- Curtis D. Buford 1965-1969
- Henry G. Allyn, Jr c. 1969-1983
- Richard Thompson c. 1983-1986
- Gordon Neuenschwander c. 1986-1993

== Pittsburgh Terminal and P&LE passenger trains ==
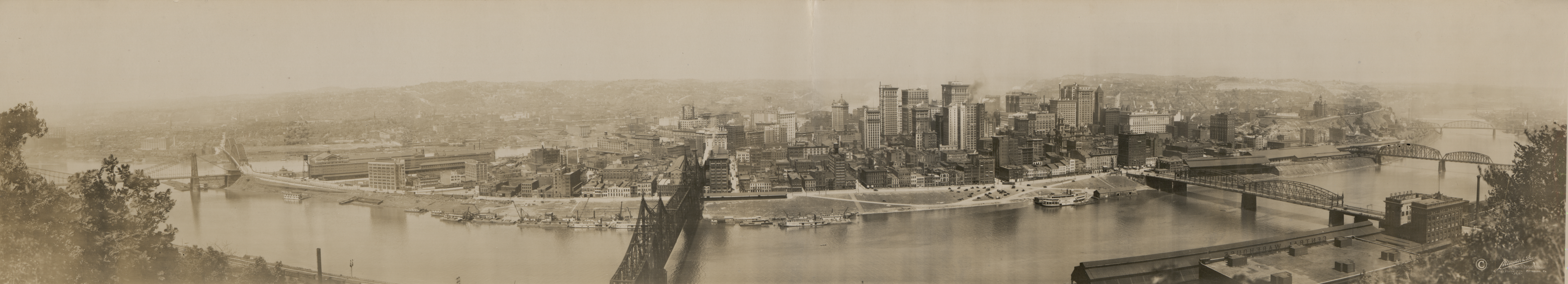

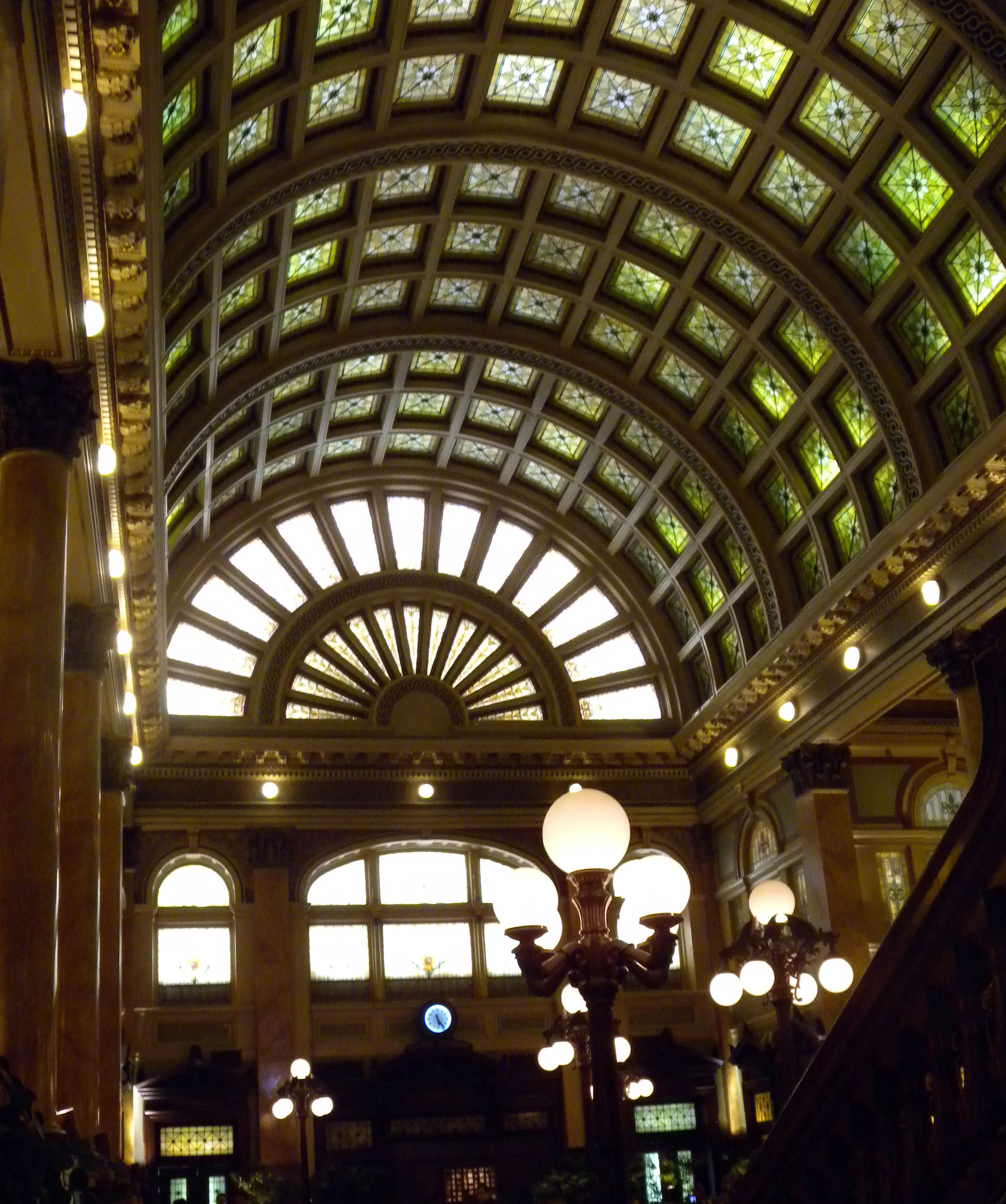
Interior of former P&LE station in Pittsburgh

The P&LE's Pittsburgh passenger train station (interior seen in the lower right photo) sat adjacent the south bank of the Monongahela River at the foot of the Smithfield Street Bridge. The Pittsburgh Terminal was the railroad's headquarters, passenger train shed, and freight warehouse complex. In the upper photo, the terminal sits along the Monongahela river. The roof of the freight house is to the right of the terminal train shed. The former P&LE headquarters building at the bottom of the Monongahela Incline has been converted into a present-day shopping center, Station Square. The passenger station has been placed on a list of historic edifices, modernized and converted to a restaurant.

During 1910 - 1930, the P & LE operated 50 passenger daily trains on its 65-mile Pittsburgh - Youngstown portion of its system. Ticketing agreements with the Erie RR and the P & LE's parent New York Central, passengers boarding in Pittsburgh could ride coaches or sleepers west to Toledo, Detroit, Chicago, and St. Louis, and north to Cleveland, Buffalo, Toronto, Albany and Boston. In addition, the P&LE operated many daily passenger trains between Pittsburgh and Connellsville.

The Baltimore & Ohio RR obtained trackage rights in 1934 on the P&LE, and Chicago-New York trains such as the Capitol Limited (Chicago-Washington), Columbian (Chicago-Washington) and Ambassador (Detroit-Baltimore) operated over the P & LE between New Castle Junction and McKeesport. These trains stopped at the Terminal located in Pittsburgh's South Side. The trackage sharing arrangement continued until Amtrak assumed responsibility for the nation's passenger rail service in 1971.

P&LE operated commuter trains into Pittsburgh. In 1964, it ran one round-trip between Youngstown and Pittsburgh as well as one additional southbound and two additional northbound trains on the section between Beaver Falls and Pittsburgh. Latest by 1968, only the section between College Hill, Beaver Falls, Aliquippa and P&LE's Pittsburgh Terminal was served by one single roundtrip commuter train per day. In 1978, P&LE tried to drop that last commuter train, which was met by fierce objections. With state support, P&LE continued to operate the commuter run but eventually ended the service on July 12, 1985, after passenger counts had dropped significantly.

The PATrain commuter operation continued to use some P&LE-trackage until 1989.

== Shops and yards ==
Gateway Yard

The Youngstown Gateway Yard was a major hub location on the railroad, until the creation of Conrail. Gateway Yard was opened in October 1957, to be a modern hump yard. The yard was approximately 200 acres (0.81 km^{2}) stretching for a distance of just over 5 miles (8.0 km) from Lowellville, Ohio to Center Street in Youngstown, Ohio. Gateway Yard was made up of three principal yards, and an assortment of smaller, special-purpose yards. The principal yards were arranged linearly, with the eastern limits of the Departure Yard in Lowellville. The Hump Yard was located in Struthers in the center of the facility, and the Receiving Yard was to the west. The special purpose yards were "Diesel Servicing Facilities", "Gorilla Park" and "Interchange" yards. The "Interchange" yard was made up of six tracks, four were for interchange to and from the B&O Railroad and two of which were for general use. The other interchange was with New York Central Railroad which was a direct interchange. The western yard limit was the end of track for the P&LE. Beyond the western end of the Yard was the NYC mainline that continued to Ashtabula, Ohio. The yard was constructed when the P&LE was under the control of the New York Central Railroad. Conrail routing most of the traffic around P&LE facilities in the area. After the 1993 CSX takeover of P&LE, Gateway Yard was closed and most tracks have been removed. The yard tower still stands but has been heavily vandalized.

McKees Rocks

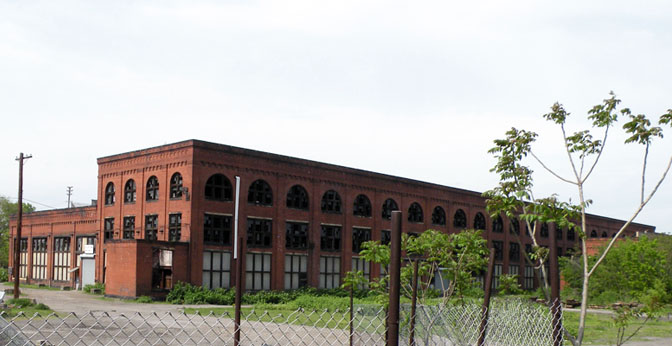
Pittsburgh and Lake Erie Railroad Locomotive Shops, built in 1903, at the end of Linden Avenue in McKees Rocks, Pennsylvania

The McKees Rocks Yard facility was home to a yard, major locomotive rebuilding and general maintenance, as well as freight car repair and maintenance. On the westernmost end of the McKees Rocks yard, the P&LE interchanged with the PC&Y. However, the PC&Y facilities were just behind the P&LE Locomotive facilities in the main yard, and trackage from the PC&Y crossed the P&LE Mainline at this point, servicing several local businesses in the Bottoms section of McKees Rocks, finally making the previously mentioned interchange. Most of the McKees Rocks facilities are now gone. The entire McKees Rocks locomotive facility, shops, and yard is to be replaced by a regional CSX intermodal facility.

In 1904, P&LE built the O'Donovan Bridge for easier automobile access from Island Avenue to The Bottoms without crossing the railroad tracks. This was replaced in 1931 by the McKees Rocks Bridge, which extended to Ohio River Boulevard but still provided access to The Bottoms via Helen Street exit.

The McKees Rocks Community Development Corporation has plans to adaptively reuse the building.

College

The College Hill neighborhood of Beaver Falls had a small yard located just below Geneva College along the Beaver River. There was also a small roundhouse on the property, plus the College Hill Station. Today, only the station remains.

== Subsidiaries ==
- Pittsburgh, McKeesport and Youghiogheny Railroad (Leased 1888 and merged in 1965)
- Pittsburgh, Chartiers and Youghiogheny Railroad (1/2 P&LE, 1/2 CR)
- Mahoning State Line Railroad (Leased 1885)
- Monongahela Railway (1/3 P&LE, 1/3 B&O, 1/3 CR(PR))
- Montour Railroad
- Lake Erie and Eastern Railroad (1/2 P&LE, 1/2 CR)
- Youngstown and Southern Railway

== See also ==
- Washingtonian (B&O train)
- Shenandoah (B&O train)
