= Youngstown station (Erie Railroad) =

Railroad station in Youngstown, Ohio

Youngstown
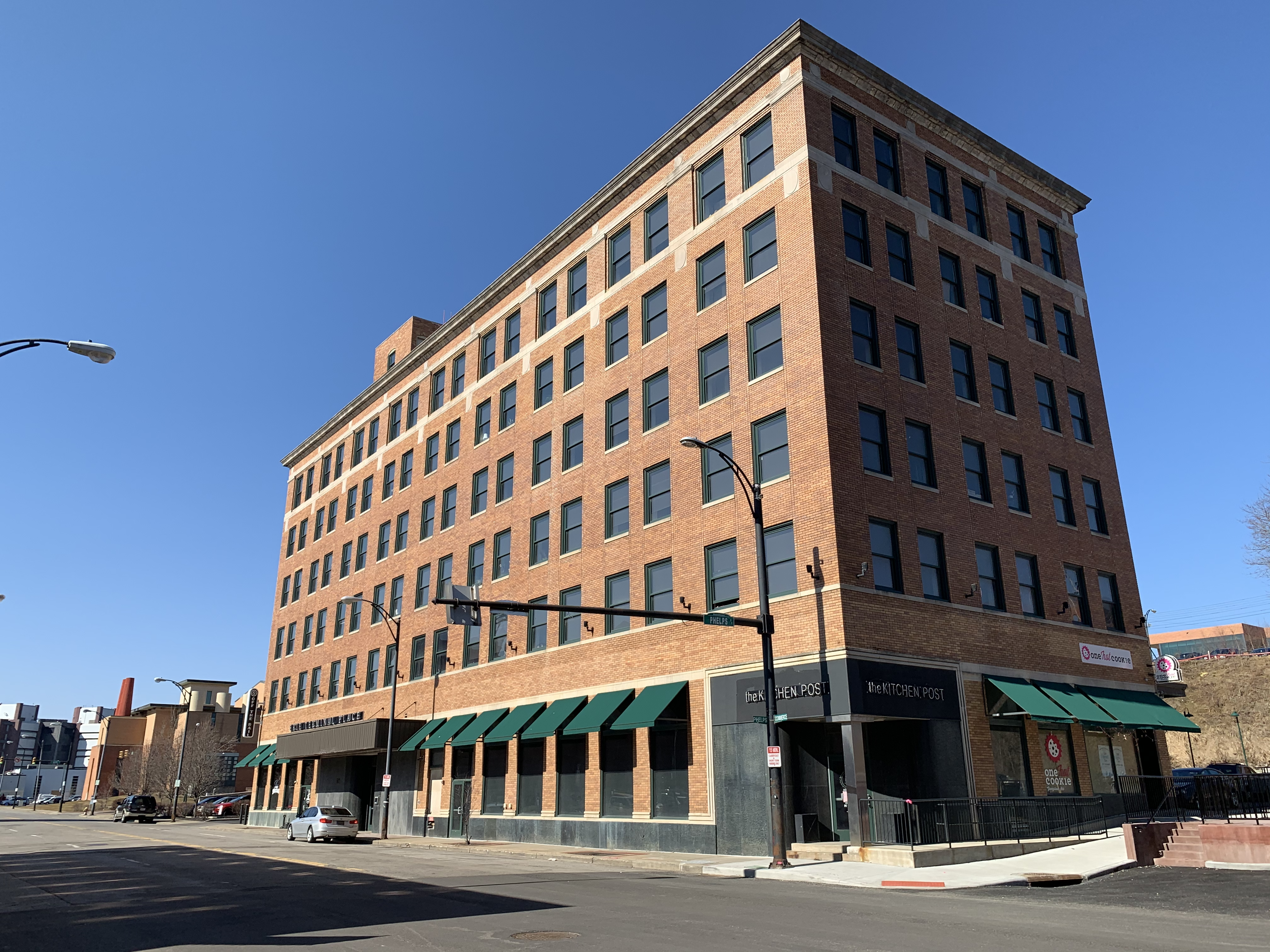

General information
- Location: 112 West Commerce Street; Youngstown, Ohio
- Coordinates: 41.10182°N 80.65014°W
- Owner: Erie Railroad (1922–1960) Erie Lackawanna Railroad (1960–1976) Conrail (1976–19??) LY Property Management (present)
- Line: Main Line (Mahoning Division)

Other information
- Station code: 5517

History
- Opened: 1922; 104 years ago
- Closed: January 14, 1977; 49 years ago

Former services
Preceding station	Erie Railroad	Following station
Girard toward Chicago	Main Line	Hubbard toward Jersey City
Girard toward Cleveland	Cleveland – Youngstown	Terminus
Brier Hill toward Cleveland	Mahoning Division before 1905	Valley Mill toward Shenango
Preceding station	New York Central Railroad	Following station
Terminus	Pittsburgh and Lake Erie Railroad Main Line	Youngstown (NYC RR) toward Pittsburgh
- Erie Terminal Building--Commerce Plaza Building
- U.S. National Register of Historic Places
- Architect: Paul Boucherle
- Architectural style: Classical Revival
- NRHP reference No.: 86001914
- Added to NRHP: July 23, 1986
Location

Youngstown was a station along the Erie Railroad and later the Erie-Lackawanna Railway, from 1922 to 1977 in Youngstown, Ohio. All railroad tracks behind the terminal have been removed, and the building is currently known as Erie Terminal Place, alternative student housing for students attending Youngstown State University.

== Passenger train services ==
The station into the 1960s served several long distance Erie-Lackawanna trains (each, former Erie Railroad trains) on the road's Hoboken, New Jersey–Chicago, Illinois circuit: the Atlantic Express/Pacific Express, the Erie Limited, the Lake Cities. The final run of the Lake Cities, the last of these trains after 1965, was in January 1970.

The Erie-Lackawanna, and then, Conrail, continued commuter rail services between Cleveland Union Terminal and Youngstown. Conrail ended this service on January 14, 1977.

== Gallery ==
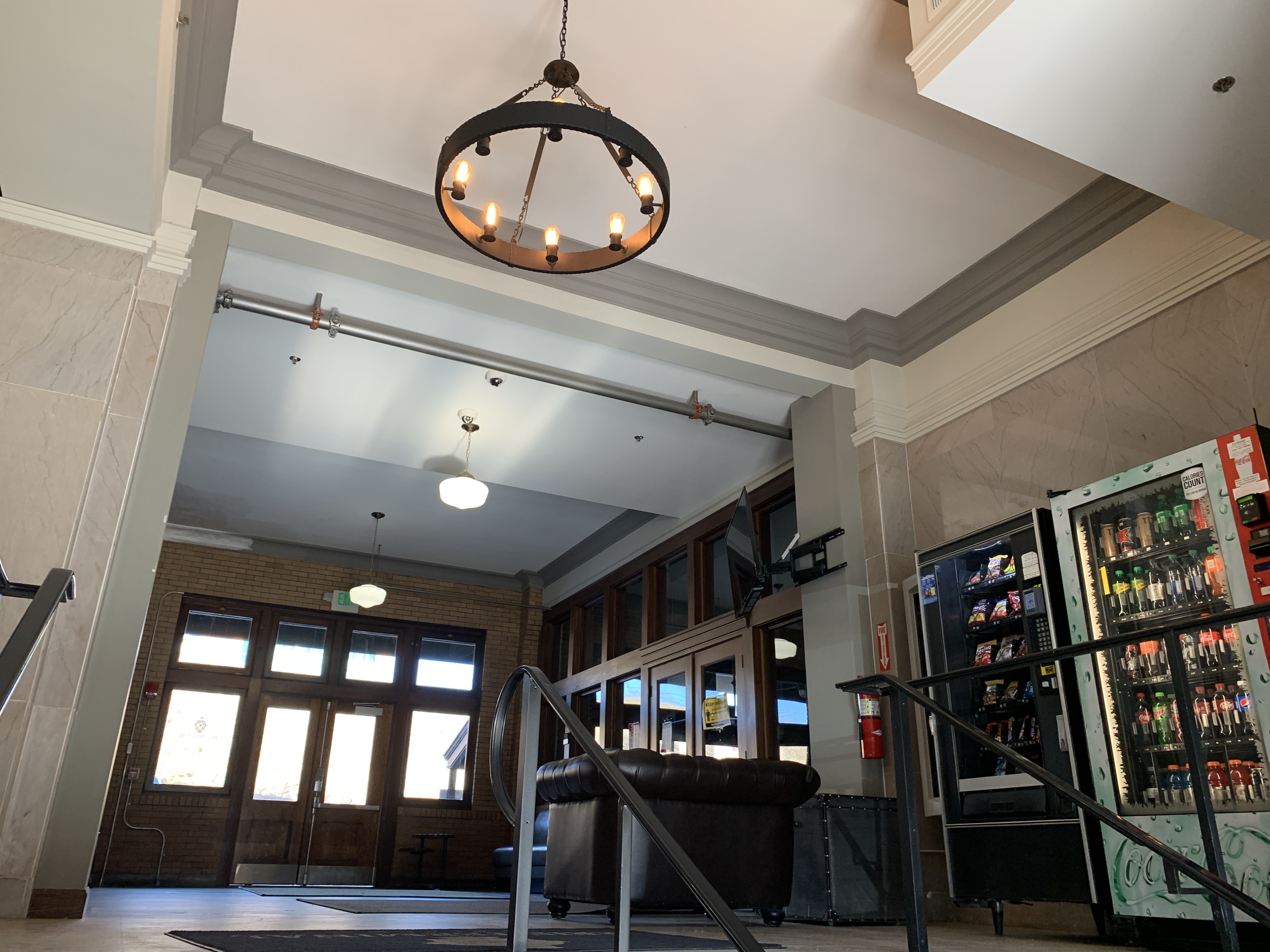

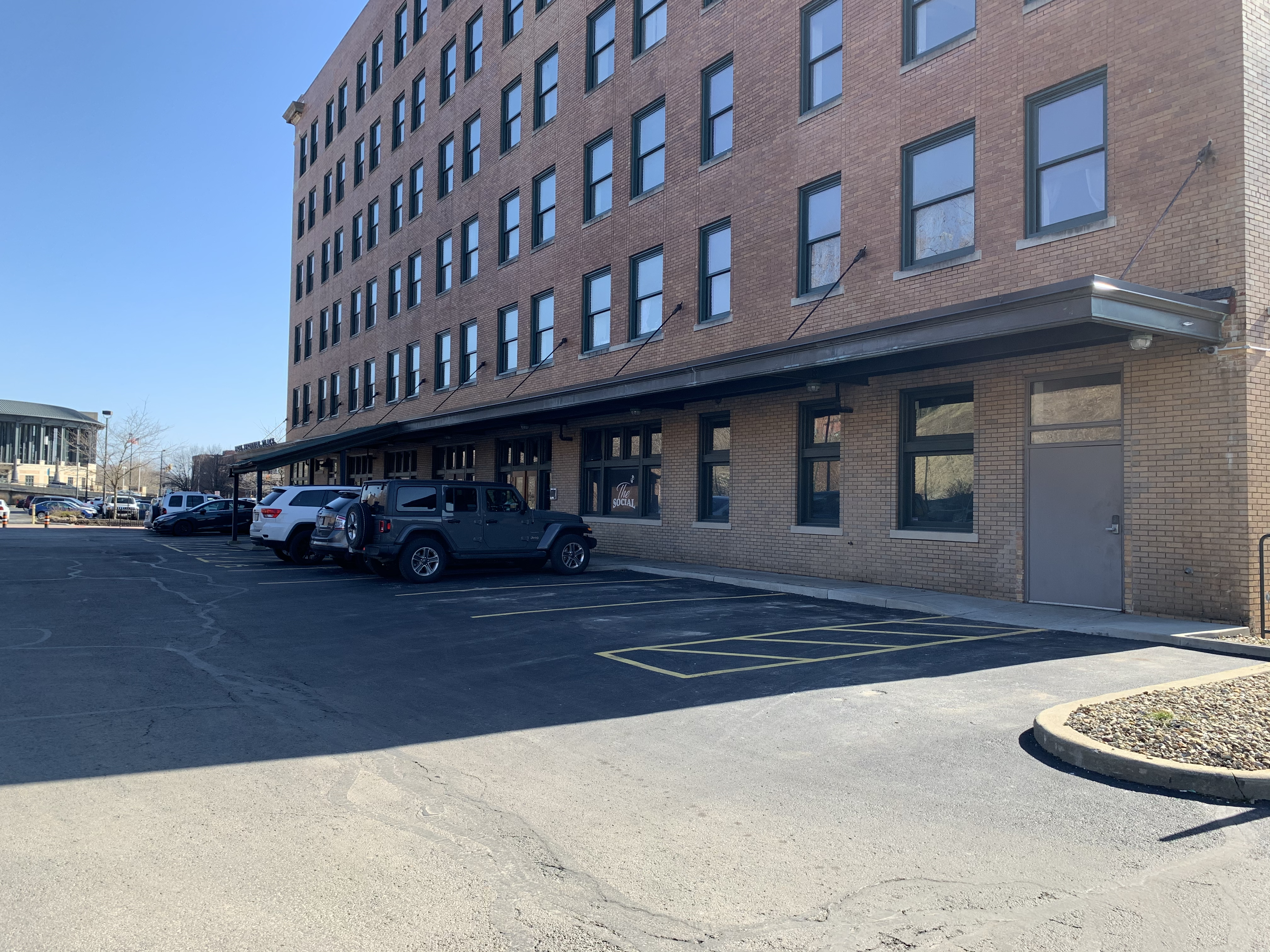

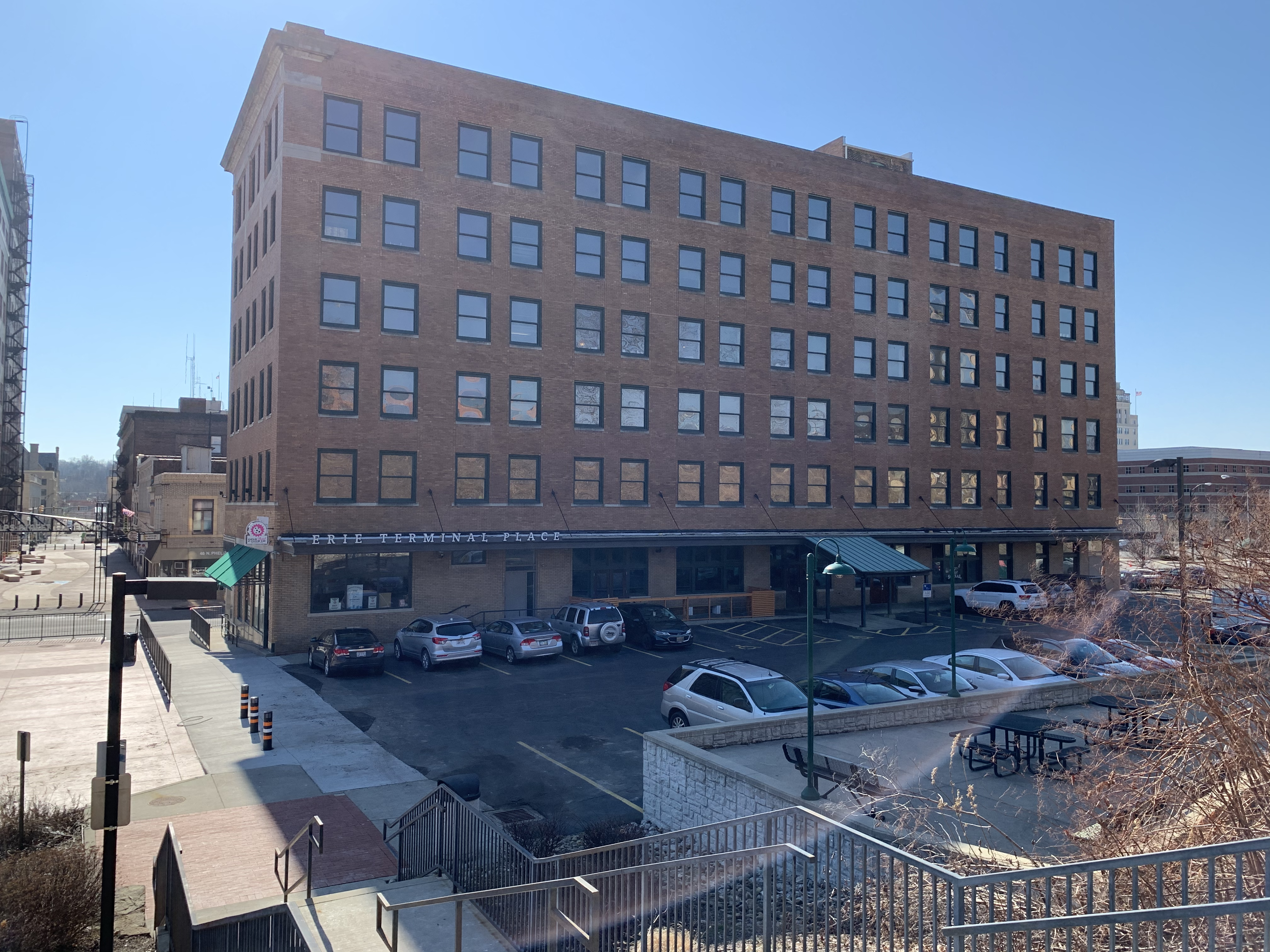
