= Pennsylvania Route 48 =

State highway in Allegheny County, Pennsylvania, US

Pennsylvania Route 48

Route information
- Maintained by PennDOT
- Length: 18.9 mi (30.4 km)

Major junctions
- South end: PA 51 / PA 48 Truck near Elizabeth
- PA 148 / PA 48 Truck in McKeesport; US 30 in North Versailles; PA 130 in Monroeville
- North end: I-76 / Penna Turnpike / I-376 / US 22 / US 22 Bus. / Orange Belt in Monroeville

Location
- Country: United States
- State: Pennsylvania
- Counties: Allegheny

Highway system
- Pennsylvania State Route System; Interstate; US; State; Scenic; Legislative
| ← PA 47 | → PA 49 |

Pennsylvania Route 48 (PA 48) is an 18.9-mile-long (30.4 km) state highway located in the Pittsburgh, Pennsylvania area. The route is predominantly a two-lane highway as it runs through McKeesport and other suburbs. The entire routing of PA 48 is part of the Orange Belt, both reaching their southern termini at PA 51, southeast of Elizabeth. Until 1998, the northern terminus of PA 48 was at the intersection of Old Haymaker and Center Roads, about 1/2 mile from its current terminus at U.S. Route 22 Business (US 22 Bus.) in Monroeville.

== Route description ==
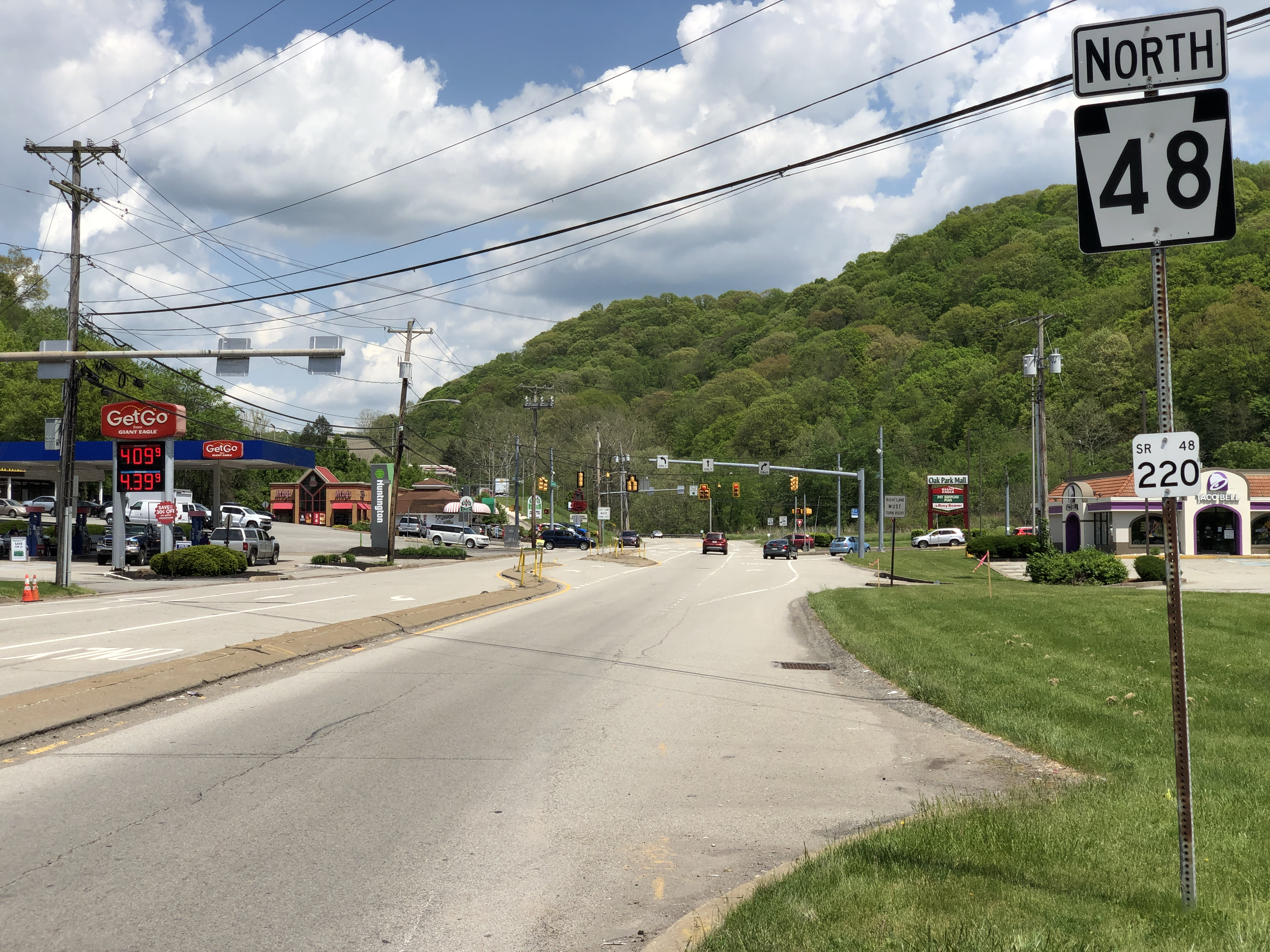
PA 48 northbound in White Oak

PA 48 begins at an intersection with PA 51 in Forward Township, heading northeast on two-lane undivided Scenery Drive. PA 48 is concurrent with the Orange Belt of the Allegheny County belt system at this point, with which it remains concurrent with for the entire length. The route immediately turns to the north-northwest and forms the border between Forward Township to the west and Elizabeth Township to the east, passing through a mix of fields and woods with some homes. The road fully enters Elizabeth Township and curves north-northeast. At an intersection with Weigles Hill Road east of Elizabeth Forward High School, PA 48 makes a turn to the east, passing residences and turning to the northwest. The road passes through more areas of housing and woods, curving northeast as it passes more residential areas. The route makes a bend northeast prior to turning north at the Simpson Howell Road intersection and running past a mix of homes and businesses. PA 48 winds north through more areas of woodland and development, with the name becoming Boston Hollow Road at the Lovedale Road junction. Farther north, the road becomes the border between the borough of Lincoln to the west and Elizabeth Township to the east as it heads through more forested areas with a few homes. The route fully enters Elizabeth Township again and heads into commercial areas as it comes to the community of Boston, crossing the Youghiogheny River on the Boston Bridge.

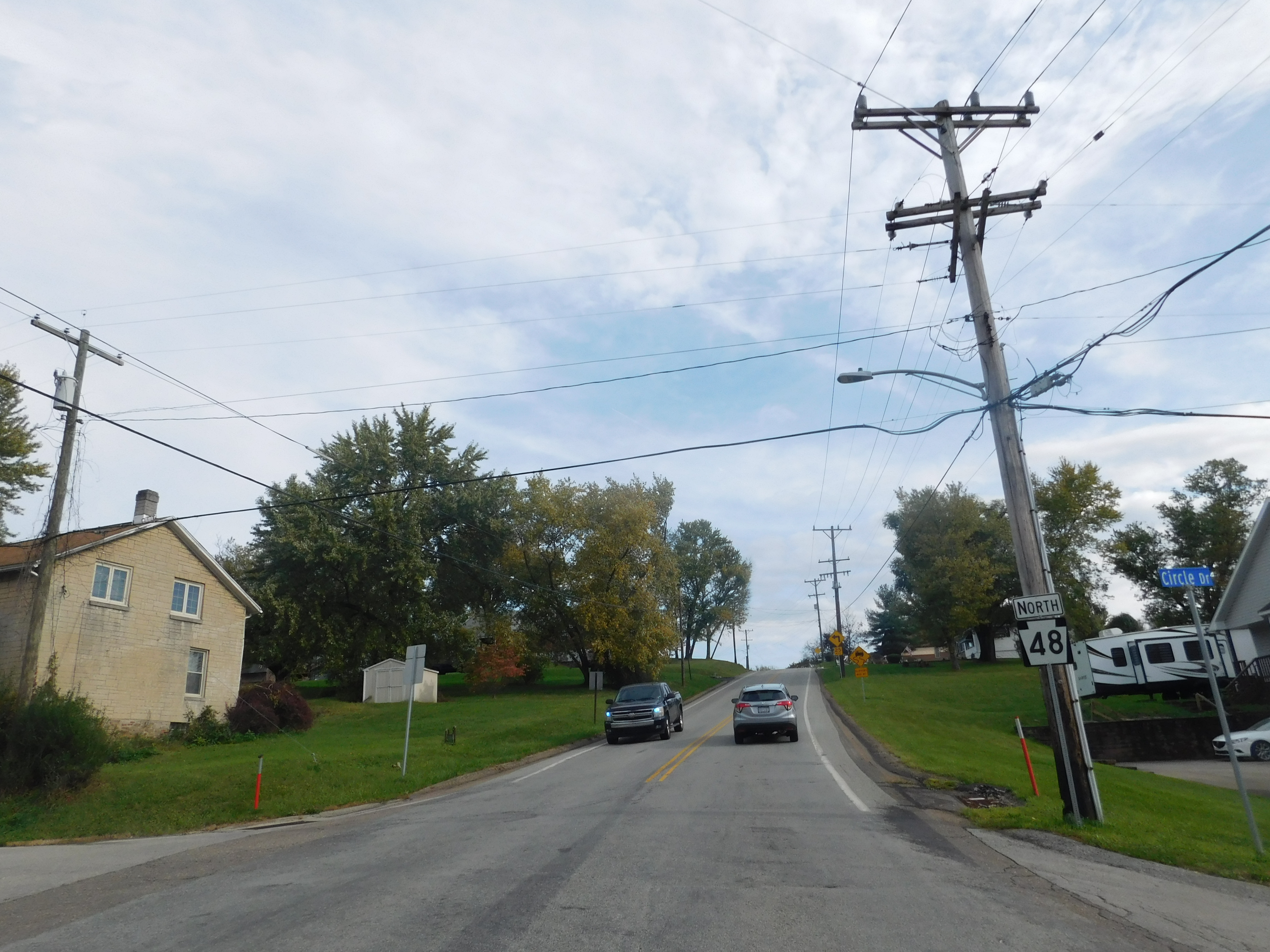
PA 48 north in Allegheny County

At this point, PA 48 heads northwest into the borough of Versailles, passing over CSX's Keystone Subdivision railroad line and becoming Walnut Street as it passes a mix of homes and businesses. The route crosses into the city of McKeesport and widens into a divided highway as it comes to an intersection with PA 148. Here, PA 148 continues along Walnut Street and PA 48 turns east onto four-lane undivided Long Run Road, passing through more residential and commercial areas. The road curves south by more businesses prior to curving east past a mix of woods and commercial development, briefly entering Versailles again before crossing back into McKeesport. The route curves north before heading northeast and entering the borough of White Oak. Upon crossing Lincoln Way, PA 48 becomes Jacks Run Road and narrows to two lanes, entering more forested areas with occasional homes and businesses. The road continues north and heads into North Versailles Township and passes through more wooded areas of development, passing east of East Allegheny High School and turning northeast before coming to an intersection with US 30.

Past this junction, the route becomes Mosside Boulevard and runs past businesses prior to heading into forested areas. The road briefly passes through the borough of Wall prior to crossing back into North Versailles Township and heading into commercial areas, turning northeast. The route widens into a four-lane divided highway and passes over Norfolk Southern's Pittsburgh Line and Turtle Creek, entering the borough of Monroeville. Here, PA 48 becomes an undivided road as it comes to an intersection with PA 130. Following this, the road narrows to two lanes and passes through woods, curving more to the north. Farther north, the route enters commercial areas, widening into a four-lane road at the Haymaker Road intersection, where it passes between Gateway High School to the west and Forbes Hospital to the east. PA 48 turns northwest, passing more businesses and reaching its northern terminus at an intersection with US 22 Bus. near an interchange that has access to I-376/US 22 and I-76 (Pennsylvania Turnpike).

== Cancelled PA 48 North-South Parkway ==
In 1963, a new PA 48 expressway was proposed to run parallel to the current PA 48 alignment from PA 51 in Elizabeth to the PA Turnpike/Parkway East Interchange in Monroeville. Although several houses and an amusement complex of swimming pool, amusement park and drive-in theater (called Rainbow Gardens) were demolished in the process, the project was scrapped by the 1970s. The route of the proposed highway is now followed roughly by the Mon–Fayette Expressway (PA 43).

== Major intersections ==
The entire route is in Allegheny County.

| Location | mi | km | Destinations | Notes |
|---|---|---|---|---|
| Elizabeth | 0.0 | 0.0 | PA 51 / PA 48 Truck north (Hayden Boulevard) – Uniontown, McKeesport Orange Belt begins | Southern terminus; southern terminus of PA 48 Truck; southeastern terminus of Orange Belt |
| Youghiogheny River | 7.1– 7.2 | 11.4– 11.6 | Boston Bridge | |
| McKeesport | 8.1 | 13.0 | PA 148 north / PA 48 Truck south (Walnut Street) – McKeesport | Northern terminus of PA 48 truck; southern terminus of PA 148 |
| North Versailles | 13.2 | 21.2 | US 30 (Lincoln Highway) – Turtle Creek, Forest Hills, Irwin | |
| Monroeville | 15.6 | 25.1 | PA 130 (Broadway Boulevard) – Pitcairn, Turtle Creek, Trafford | |
| Monroeville | 18.9 | 30.4 | I-376 west / US 22 west / US 22 Bus. (William Penn Highway) / Orange Belt (Haymaker Road) – Monroeville, Murrysville, Plum | Northern terminus; northern end of Orange Belt concurrency; exit 84A on I-376 |
1.000 mi = 1.609 km; 1.000 km = 0.621 mi: Concurrency terminus

== PA 48 Truck ==
Pennsylvania Route 48 Truck
- Location: Allegheny County
- Existed: 2013–present

Pennsylvania Route 48 Truck (PA 48 Truck) is a truck route of PA 48 that bypasses a weight-restricted bridge over a branch of Wylie Run in Lincoln, on which trucks over 32 tons are prohibited. The route follows PA 51, McKeesport Road, Lincoln Boulevard, Glassport-Elizabeth Road, the Clairton-Glassport Bridge over the Monongahela River, PA 837, the McKeesport-Duquesne Bridge over the Monongahela River, PA 148, PA 148 Truck, and PA 148. As of 2022, the route is still intact; however, any weight restrictions on Wylie Creek bridges were removed by 2021.

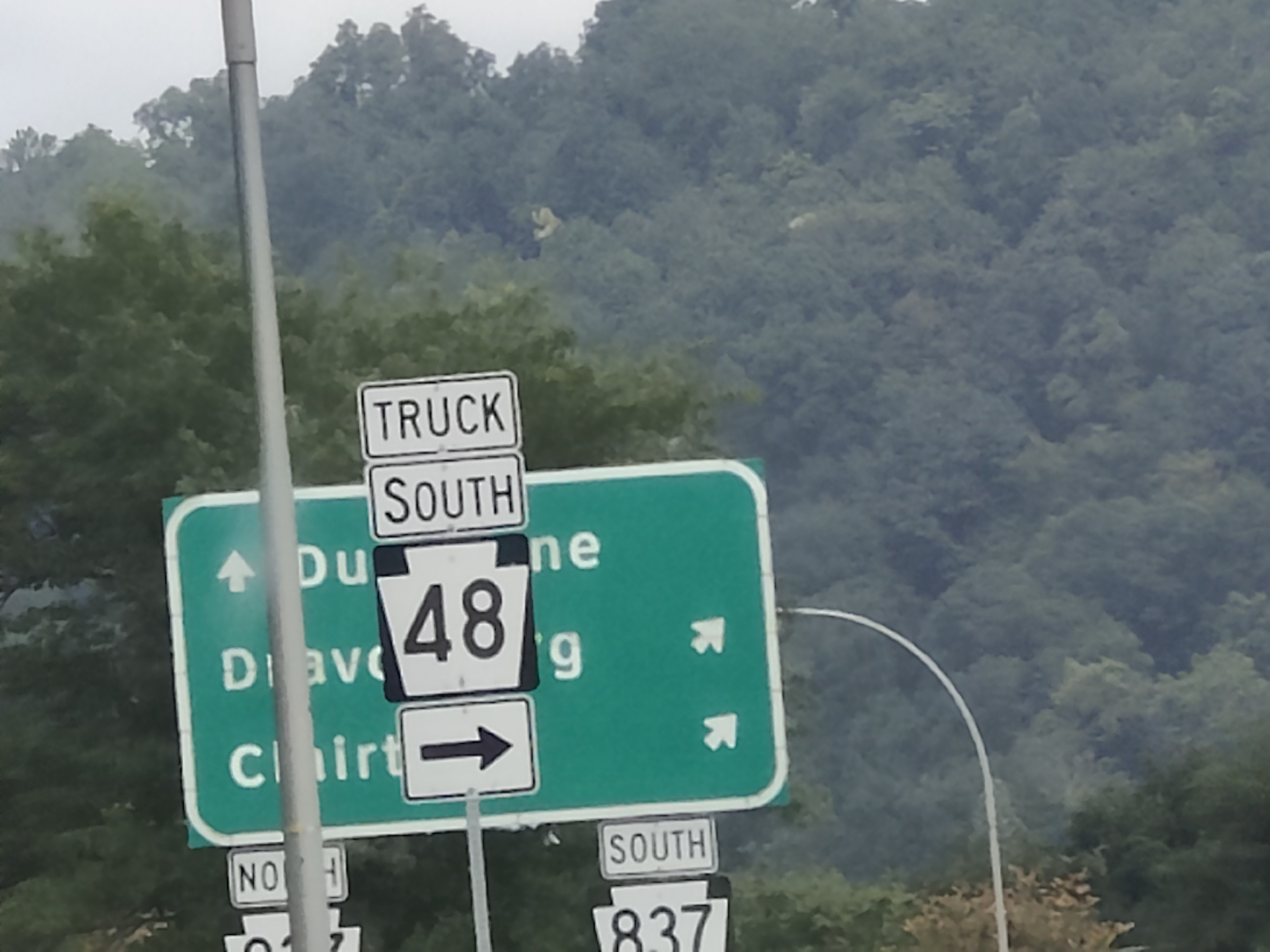
PA 48 Truck southbound from the Clairton-Glassport Bridge.

The entire route is in Allegheny County.

| Location | mi | km | Destinations | Notes |
|---|---|---|---|---|
| Elizabeth | 0.00 | 0.00 | PA 48 north / Orange Belt (Scenery Drive) / PA 51 south (Hayden Boulevard) / Payday Drive – Uniontown, McKeesport | Southern terminus of PA 48 Truck; southern end of PA 51 concurrency |
| Elizabeth | 3.36 | 5.41 | PA 51 north to PA 837 / 2nd Avenue – Pittsburgh, Bunola PA 51 Truck begins | Northern end of PA 51 concurrency; southern end of PA 51 Truck concurrency |
| Glassport | 7.21 | 11.60 | Ohio Avenue to PA 148 – Glassport, McKeesport | |
| Monongahela River | 7.21– 7.66 | 11.60– 12.33 | Clairton-Glassport Bridge | |
| Clairton | 7.66 | 12.33 | PA 837 south / PA 51 Truck south (North State Street) to PA 885 / Carnegie Avenue – Clairton | Northern end of PA 51 Truck concurrency; southern end of PA 837 concurrency |
| Duquesne | 13.10 | 21.08 | PA 837 north / Green Belt (South Duquesne Boulevard) – Duquesne | Interchange; northern end of PA 837 concurrency; southern end of Green Belt concurrency |
| Monongahela River | 13.10– 13.60 | 21.08– 21.89 | McKeesport-Duquesne Bridge | |
| McKeesport | 13.60 | 21.89 | PA 148 north / Yellow Belt (5th Avenue) / Bowman Avenue to US 30 – North Versailles, East Pittsburgh Green Belt ends | Interchange; northern end of PA 148 concurrency; northern end of Yellow Belt concurrency; southern end of Green Belt concurrency |
| McKeesport | 13.85 | 22.29 | 5th Avenue – UPMC McKeesport | No northbound entrance |
| McKeesport | 14.83 | 23.87 | PA 148 south (Walnut Street) PA 148 Truck begins | Northern end of PA 148 concurrency; southern end of PA 148 Truck concurrency |
| McKeesport | 14.92 | 24.01 | Yellow Belt (Lysle Boulevard) / Market Street – Dravosburg | Southern end of Yellow Belt concurrency |
| McKeesport | 15.70 | 25.27 | PA 148 north (Walnut Street) / 13th Street PA 148 Truck ends | Southern end of PA 148 concurrency; northern end of PA 148 Truck concurrency |
| McKeesport | 17.55 | 28.24 | PA 48 / Orange Belt (Walnut Street / Long Run Road) – North Versailles, Elizabeth PA 148 ends | Northern terminus; northern end of PA 148 concurrency |
1.000 mi = 1.609 km; 1.000 km = 0.621 mi: Concurrency terminus; Incomplete access

== See also ==
- Mon-Fayette Expressway
