= Versailles Township, Allegheny County, Pennsylvania =

Coordinates: 40.36°N 79.81°W

The Township of Versailles was one of the seven original townships of Allegheny County, Pennsylvania created during the first meeting of the Allegheny County Court in 1788. The other townships were Pitt (which included the village of Pittsburgh), Plum, St. Clair, Moon, Mifflin, and Elizabeth. Versailles was named for Versailles, France, in honor of the United States' French allies during the American Revolution.

Versailles Township originally comprised that portion of the county lying east of the Monongahela River, south of Turtle Creek and north of the Youghiogheny River. A corner of the township broke away in 1842 to form the borough of McKeesport. The remainder split into North Versailles and South Versailles townships in 1869. Motivating this split was the growth of the communities of Port Perry and Coultersville at opposite extremes of the territory. Further divisions gave rise to the boroughs of Versailles, East McKeesport, Wall, White Oak, and portions of Wilmerding and Trafford.
