= Pennsylvania Route 148 =

State highway in Allegheny County, Pennsylvania, US

Pennsylvania Route 148
- PA 148 in red and PA 148 Truck in blue

Route information
- Maintained by PennDOT
- Length: 6.50 mi (10.46 km)
- Existed: 1928–present

Major junctions
- South end: PA 48 / PA 48 Truck / Orange Belt in McKeesport
- North end: US 30 / Yellow Belt in East McKeesport

Location
- Country: United States
- State: Pennsylvania
- Counties: Allegheny

Highway system
- Pennsylvania State Route System; Interstate; US; State; Scenic; Legislative
← PA 147	→ PA 149

Pennsylvania Route 148 (PA 148) is a 6.50-mile-long (10.46 km), north–south state highway located in Allegheny County, Pennsylvania. The southern terminus is at PA 48 in McKeesport. The northern terminus is at U.S. Route 30 (US 30) in East McKeesport.

== Route description ==
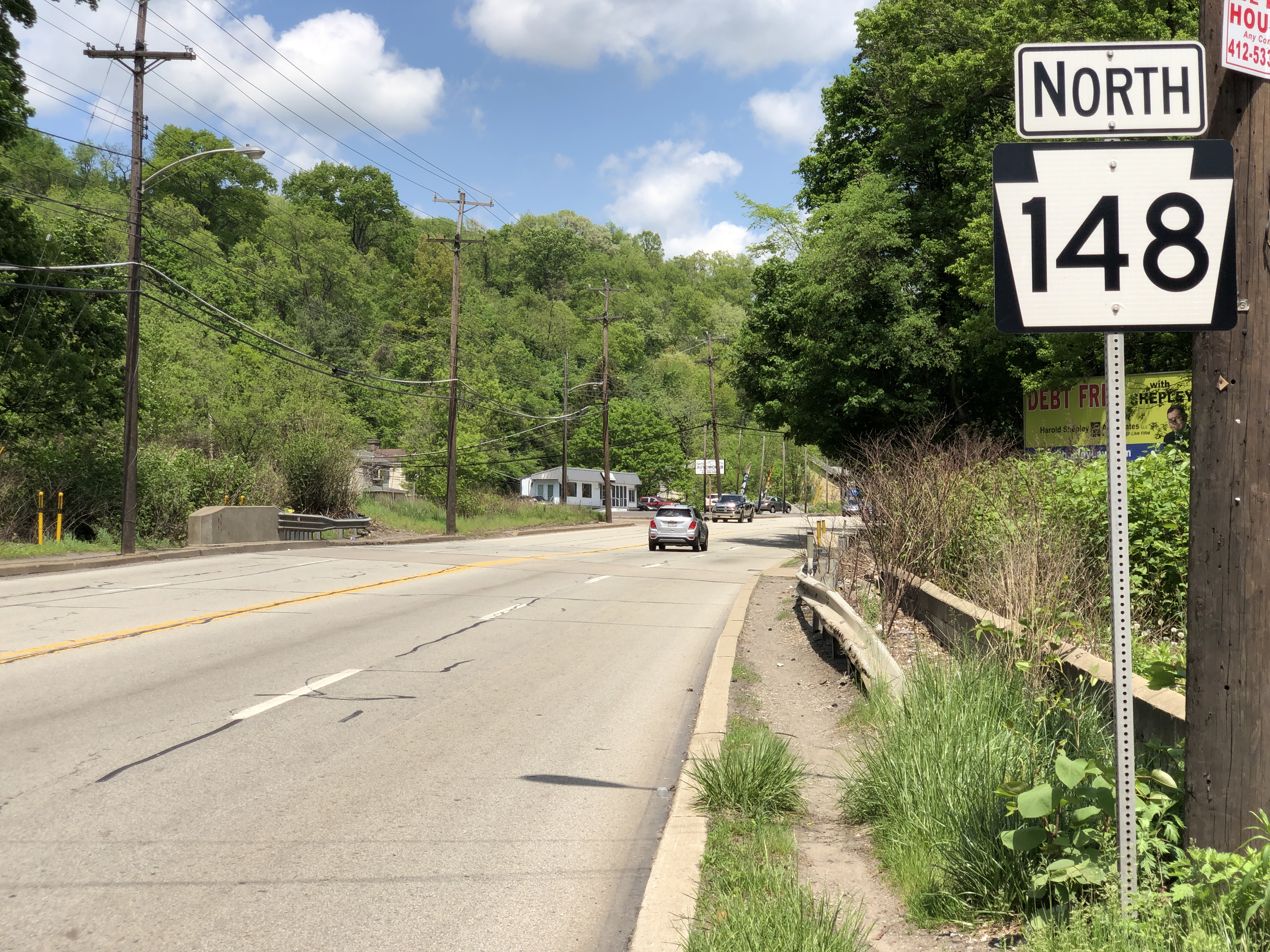
PA 148 northbound on the border of McKeesport and White Oak

The street names along PA 148 include Walnut Street, Lysle Boulevard, and 5th Avenue.

PA 148 begins at PA 48 in the city of McKeesport, just outside the town of Versailles, and goes northwest, paralleling the Youghiogheny River to downtown McKeesport. In downtown McKeesport, PA 148 turns east to parallel the Monongahela River to an interchange with the McKeesport-Duquesne Bridge and Bowman Avenue. The route continues northeast to the town of East McKeesport where it terminates at US 30.

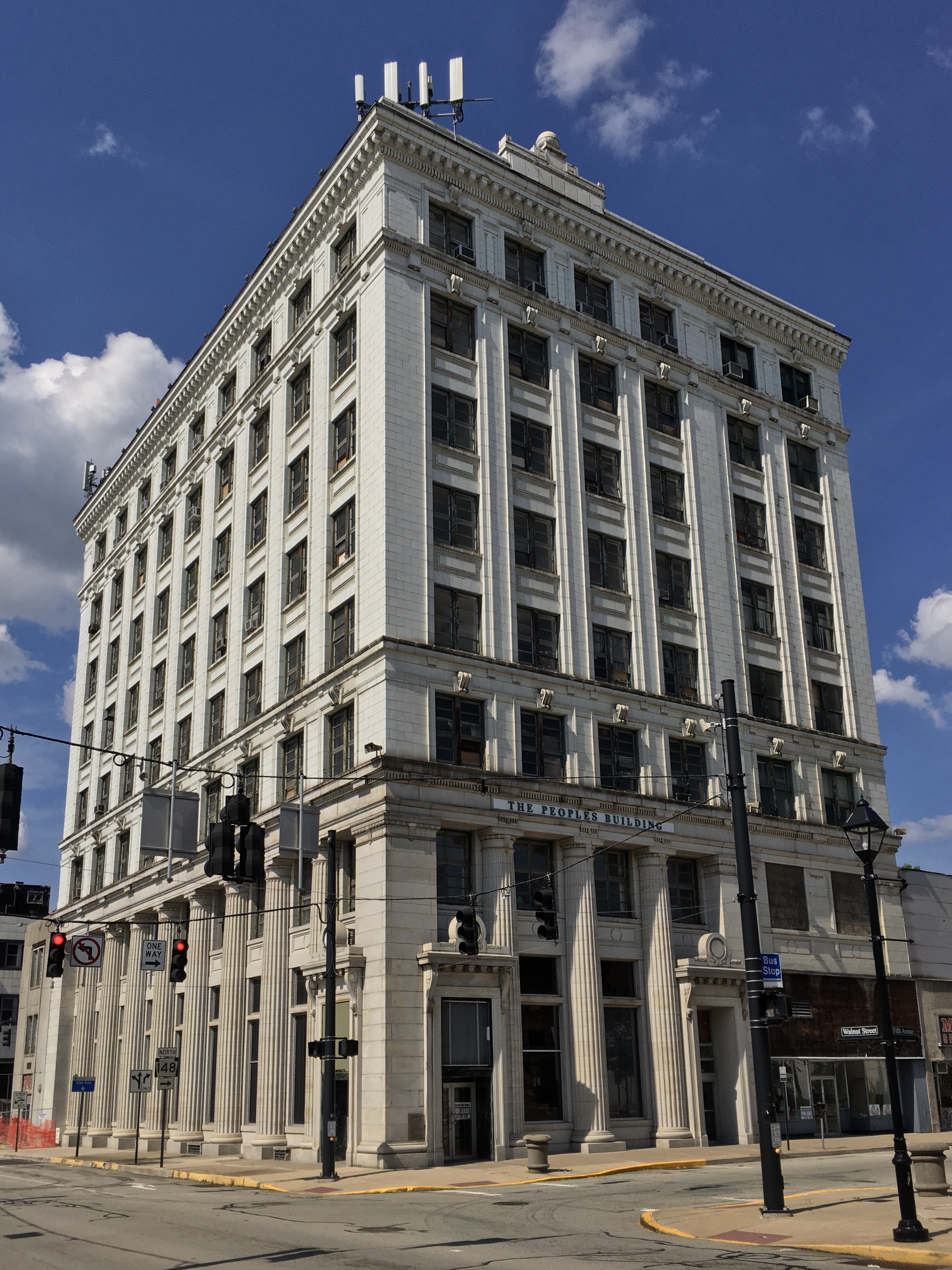
People's Union Bank & Trust Company Building, McKeesport, Pennsylvania on PA 148

Three of the Allegheny County belt system routes connect with PA 148. The Orange Belt intersects with PA 148's southern terminus. The Yellow Belt runs along PA 148 for 4 miles from Walnut St. in downtown McKeesport to its northern terminus at US 30 in East McKeesport. The Green Belt terminates at the interchange with the McKeesport-Duquesne Bridge.

== History ==
The route was first signed in 1928, from the current PA 48 alignment to US 30. In the 1950s, the route changed alignment to its current route, with minor fluctuations through the years.

== Major intersections ==
The entire route is in Allegheny County.

Location	mi	km	Destinations	Notes
McKeesport	0.00	0.00	PA 48 / Orange Belt (Long Run Road / Walnut Street) – North Versailles, Elizabeth PA 48 Truck begins	Southern terminus of PA 148; southern end of PA 48 Truck concurrency
McKeesport	1.86	2.99	PA 48 Truck south PA 148 Truck begins	Northern end of PA 48 Truck concurrency; southern terminus of PA 148 Truck
McKeesport	2.72	4.38	PA 48 Truck north / Yellow Belt (Market Street) – Dravosburg PA 148 Truck ends	Southern end of PA 48 Truck concurrency; northern terminus of PA 148 Truck; southern end of Yellow Belt concurrency
McKeesport	3.75	6.04	PA 48 Truck south / Green Belt (McKeesport-Duquesne Bridge) to PA 837 / PA 51 Truck south – Duquesne; Bowman Avenue – East Pittsburgh	Interchange; northern end of PA 48 Truck concurrency; southeastern terminus of Green Belt
East McKeesport	6.50	10.46	US 30 (Lincoln Highway) / Yellow Belt (5th Avenue) – Forest Hills, Irwin, Wilmerding	Northern terminus of PA 148; northern end of Yellow Belt concurrency
1.000 mi = 1.609 km; 1.000 km = 0.621 mi: Concurrency terminus; Incomplete access

== PA 148 Truck ==
Pennsylvania Route 148 Truck
- Location: McKeesport, Pennsylvania
- Existed: 1976–present

Pennsylvania Route 148 Truck is a 0.87-mile-long (1.40 km) truck route located in Allegheny County in Pennsylvania. The entire route lies in the town of McKeesport. There have been times where the route was unsigned, but in 2006, markers were erected. The route follows Market Street, two blocks to the west and significantly wider than Walnut Street, which mainline Route 148 follows. The entire route is in McKeesport, Allegheny County.

mi	km	Destinations	Notes
0.00	0.00	PA 148 south / PA 48 Truck north (Walnut Street) to 13th Street / PA 48 – North Versailles, Elizabeth	Southern terminus; southern end of PA 48 Truck concurrency
0.78	1.26	Yellow Belt (Lysle Boulevard) – Dravosburg	Southern end of Yellow Belt concurrency
0.87	1.40	PA 148 / PA 48 Truck south / Yellow Belt (Lysle Boulevard / Walnut Street) to PA 837 – Duquesne	Northern terminus; northern end of PA 48 Truck/Yellow Belt concurrency
1.000 mi = 1.609 km; 1.000 km = 0.621 mi: Concurrency terminus
