= Yellow Belt =

Yellow Belt may refer to:

- a level in the Japanese system of classification known as Kyū
  - Rank in judo
- Yellow Belt road in the Allegheny County belt system
