= North Versailles Township, Pennsylvania =

Township in Pennsylvania, US

North Versailles Township
- Township
- Location in Allegheny County and the state of Pennsylvania

- Location of Pennsylvania in the United States
- Coordinates: 40°22′49″N 79°48′37″W
- Country: United States
- State: Pennsylvania
- County: Allegheny

Area
  - Total: 8.19 sq mi (21.22 km^{2})
  - Land: 8.03 sq mi (20.79 km^{2})
  - Water: 0.17 sq mi (0.43 km^{2})

Population (2020)
  - Total: 10,079
  - Estimate (2024): 9,694
  - Density: 1,257/sq mi (485.2/km^{2})
- Time zone: UTC-5 (EST)
  - Summer (DST): UTC-4 (EDT)
- FIPS code: 42-003-55488

North Versailles (/vɜːrˈseɪlz/ vur-SAYLZ) is a township in Allegheny County, Pennsylvania, United States. The population was 10,079 at the 2020 census. The township derives its name from the Palace of Versailles.

== History ==
North Versailles Township was formed on September 18, 1869, by a division of (the original) Versailles Township into North and South Versailles townships. Versailles Township was one of the original seven townships of Allegheny County formed in 1788 from Westmoreland County. Additionally, the land which encompasses the present day North Versailles Township was disputed territory between Pennsylvania and Virginia, which claimed the area as part of Yohogania County of the District of West Augusta.

The territory designated in 1788 as Versailles Township now contains the townships of North Versailles and South Versailles; the boroughs of White Oak, East McKeesport, Wall, Versailles, and portions of Wilmerding and Trafford; as well as the major portion (excluding 10th ward) of the city of McKeesport.

North Versailles was further divided with the formation of the boroughs of East McKeesport (1895), Wall (1904), and portions of the boroughs of Wilmerding (1890) and Trafford (1904). The section of Wilmerding on the north side of Turtle Creek was originally part of the former Patton Township, and the majority of Trafford is situated in Westmoreland County. An area of North Versailles (Allequippa Grove, later known as North McKeesport and Highland Grove) was annexed by the city of McKeesport.

Early villages and population centers in North Versailles included Port Perry, Saltsburgh and Allequippa Grove along the Monongahela River; Pleasant Hill near to what is now East McKeesport; Point Pleasant located near the present intersections of Route 30 and McKee and Naser roads; and Stewart's Station, Spring Hill, Mosside Station, Wall Station, and Wilmerding Station along Turtle Creek, a tributary of the Monongahela River.

North Versailles has a number of named neighborhoods, including the following which roughly correspond to the township's seven wards:

- Ward 1: Park Terrace
- Ward 2: Arlington
- Ward 3: Sunset and South Wilmerding
- Ward 4: Green Valley and Fite Station
- Ward 5: West Wilmerding
- Ward 6: Dixon Hollow and Oak Hill
- Ward 7: Crestas Terrace

Fire department: At one time, North Versailles was served by eight volunteer fire departments. Each ward was served by one department, with the exception of Ward 3, which had both the Sunset and South Wilmerding VFDs. Ward 4 and 6's fire departments were the Green Valley VFD and Dixon VFD respectively.

Currently, three fire departments serve the township. Crestas VFD serves Crestas Terrace, West Wilmerding VFD serves West Wilmerding. The remaining five wards of the township are served by the Fire Department of North Versailles (FDNV) with 2 stations. The FDNV has the designation of Station 213 and is currently dispatched by the Allegheny County 911 center. Station 1 houses a rescue truck, an engine, and a squad. Station 2 houses an engine, and a squad. The stations are respectively the former Sunset-Central VFD, Green Valley VFD. They are now known as FDNV Station 1 and 2.

FDNV Station 1 is located at 1021 Broad Street and Station 2 is located at 518 Oakhurst Street.

Police department: The North Versailles Police Department is led by Chief Norm Locke with over 20+ sworn police officers and police K9, Chase. the department has a detective bureau, traffic division, K-9 unit, and a tactical team.

In November 2023, Police Officer Steven Shawley and his K9 partner Chase were shot and wounded in the line of duty responding to a domestic violence call. Officer Shawley, who was shot in the hand and face, and K9 Chase in the front paw had made a full recovery and returned to full duty. The shooter, Ian Fields pleaded guilty to the shooting and is currently serving up to a 30-year sentence in the Pennsylvania state prison.

Up until the end of 2016, the North Versailles Township Police department patrolled the borough of Wilmerding.

Emergency medical services: Emergency medical services (EMS) in the Township of North Versailles is provided by the Fire Department of North Versailles (FDNV) out of Station 1. The FDNV EMS Division is led by Kayla DiMeo and is dispatched by Allegheny County 911 and holds the station number of 390. FDNV EMS Division maintains 2 type 3 ambulances (designated 391 & 392) licensed at the Advanced Life Support (ALS) level by the PA Department of Health. One ambulance is staffed 24/7 by an Emergency Medical Technician (EMT) and an Emergency Medical Technician-Paramedic (EMT-P or Paramedic) and the crews work 24-hour shifts. Members of FDNV EMS Division are cross trained in firefighting and technical rescue. The division is managed by a chief officer. FDNV EMS responds to approximately 2,500 calls a year.

UPMC pre-hospital services maintains an ALS licensed response unit at station 1 dispatched by Allegheny County 911 and holds the station number 920. This unit provides ALS assistance to EMS services in the area.

== Government and politics ==
Presidential election results
Year	Republican	Democratic	Third parties
2020	45% 2,468	53% 2,848	1% 57
2016	49% 2,370	50% 2,384	1% 40
2012	45% 2,043	54% 2,464	1% 49

== Schools ==
North Versailles, East McKeesport, Wilmerding, and Wall consolidated school systems in the early 1960s to form the East Allegheny School District. East Allegheny High School (the Wildcats – 1969) is situated off Route 48 (Jack's Run Road) near the intersection of U.S. Route 30. Green Valley School (1955) is the only surviving school of the former North Versailles School District which included (but is not limited to) the following other schools during the township's history:

- Port Perry School
- Saltsburg(h) School
- Bowman School
- Pleasant Hills School
- Spring Hill School
- Kincaid School
- Point Pleasant School
- Oak Hill School
- North McKeesport School
- Arlington School
- Sunset School
- South Wilmerding School
- Dixon Avenue School
- Crestas School
- Keith School
- West Wilmerding School
- Park Terrace Junior High

Prior to the formation of the East Allegheny School District, North Versailles high school age students were able to choose to go to one of several high schools in other districts, including East McKeesport High School (the Rams), Westinghouse Memorial High School (the Wildcats), Turtle Creek High School (the Creekers), McKeesport Area High School (the Tigers), and East Pittsburgh High School (the Shamrocks).

At the formation of the East Allegheny School District (known as Westinghouse Valley Area Schools from 1962 to 1966), Westinghouse Memorial High School became the district's official high school until the building of East Allegheny High School in 1969. The former East McKeesport High School was transformed into a junior high serving East McKeesport, Wilmerding, Wall and certain portions of North Versailles near East McKeesport. Park Terrace Junior High (1955—the Bobcats) served the township. During the 1968–69 school year, Park Terrace was designated a middle school serving all seventh and eighth graders in the district and East McKeesport served only 9th grade students for this one year; it would serve other populations until its closure in 1982. Neither school building exists today.

The North Versailles Police Department currently staffs police officers in East Allegheny High School and Logan Middle School.

== Geography ==
North Versailles is located at 40°22′49″N 79°48′37″W (40.380219, −79.810178).

According to the United States Census Bureau, the township has a total area of 8.3 square miles (21.5 km^{2}), of which 8.1 square miles (21.0 km^{2}) is land and 0.2 square miles (0.52 km^{2}), or 1.93%, is water.

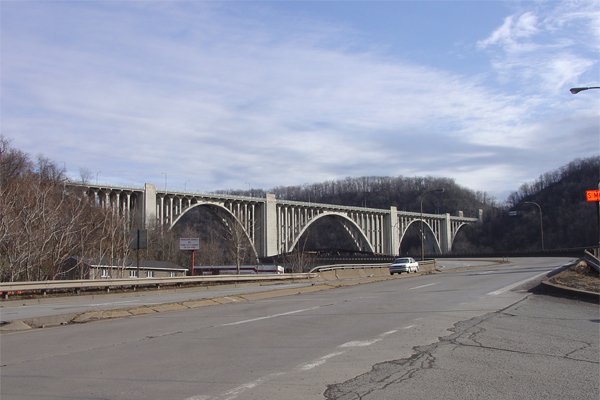
George Westinghouse Bridge at the western terminus of North Versailles Township

North Versailles is bordered by the Monongahela River to the west, Turtle Creek to the west and north, North Huntingdon and Westmoreland County to the east, and the city of McKeesport and the borough of White Oak to the south. The township surrounds East McKeesport, Wilmerding, and Wall.

The Lincoln Highway, US Route 30, traverses North Versailles and on its western border crosses the Turtle Creek valley via the George Westinghouse Bridge into East Pittsburgh.

Other highways in the township include PA 48 (Jack's Run Road/Mosside Boulevard—the Orange Belt) and PA 148 (Fifth Avenue Extension—the Yellow Belt). In addition to Routes 48 and 148, Greensburg Pike Section 2 and the East Pittsburgh McKeesport Boulevard provide access to the Tri Boro Expressway.

== Demographics ==
Historical population
Census	Pop.	Note	%±
1930	5,668		—
1940	6,341		11.9%
1950	9,821		54.9%
1960	13,583		38.3%
1970	13,416		−1.2%
1980	13,294		−0.9%
1990	12,302		−7.5%
2000	11,125		−9.6%
2010	10,229		−8.1%
2020	10,079		−1.5%
2024 (est.)	9,694		−3.8%
U.S. Decennial Census

As of the 2010 census, there were 10,229 people, 4,785 households, and 2,792 families living in the township. The population density was 1,275 per square mile. There were 5,219 housing units at an average density of 650.7 per square mile. The racial makeup of the township was 82.93% White, 13.77% African American, 0.13% Native American, 0.74% Asian, 0.02% Pacific Islander, 0.22% from other races, and 2.20% from two or more races. Hispanic or Latino people of any race were 0.90% of the population.

As of the 2000 census, there were 11,125 people, 4,933 households, and 3,102 families living in the township. The population density was 1,371.9 inhabitants per square mile (529.7/km^{2}). There were 5,227 housing units at an average density of 644.6 per square mile (248.9/km^{2}). The racial makeup of the township was 87.81% White, 9.77% African American, 0.06% Native American, 0.76% Asian, 0.03% Pacific Islander, 0.22% from other races, and 1.35% from two or more races. Hispanic or Latino people of any race were 0.49% of the population.

There were 4,933 households, out of which 23.3% had children under the age of 18 living with them, 44.7% were married couples living together, 13.9% had a female householder with no husband present, and 37.1% were non-families. 32.7% of all households were made up of individuals, and 14.3% had someone living alone who was 65 years of age or older. The average household size was 2.23 and the average family size was 2.82.

In the township the population was spread out, with 19.9% under the age of 18, 7.1% from 18 to 24, 27.5% from 25 to 44, 24.1% from 45 to 64, and 21.4% who were 65 years of age or older. The median age was 42 years. For every 100 females, there were 89.4 males. For every 100 females age 18 and over, there were 85.0 males.

The median income for a household in the township was $30,617, and the median income for a family was $38,145. Males had a median income of $31,389 versus $25,451 for females. The per capita income for the township was $16,991. About 8.5% of families and 9.8% of the population were below the poverty line, including 17.4% of those under age 18 and 8.5% of those age 65 or over.

== Notable people ==
Comedienne Donna Jean Young (born 29 May 1936, East McKeesport, Pennsylvania, died 29 January 2010, Sydney, Australia), whose career was built upon her material related to East McKeesport and "Woolmerding" (as she pronounced and spelled Wilmerding in her act), was a resident of Broadway Extension, Arlington Plan, North Versailles Township. In her youth, portions of North Versailles used East McKeesport as a postal address and were long associated with this community. Young was briefly a cast member on Rowan and Martin's Laugh-In, and On the Flip Side, Happening '68, and The Tonight Show Starring Johnny Carson (1969) In 1968, she released an album on Epic Records, Live From East McKeesport.

Noted jazz drummer Jeff "Tain" Watts (Wynton Marsalis and numerous others) is a 1977 graduate of East Allegheny High School.

Gordon Jones, a 1975 graduate of East Allegheny High School, was an All-American wide receiver at the University of Pittsburgh and went on to play in the NFL for the Tampa Bay Buccaneers and the Los Angeles Rams.

Elroy (Roy) Face was a Pittsburgh Pirates relief pitcher from 1953 to 1966. He holds the major league record for most wins by a relief pitcher, 18–1, set in 1959. In a 16-season career, he posted a 104–95 record with a 3.48 ERA and 877 strikeouts in 1375 innings pitched and 848 games. His NL record of 193 saves was not broken until 1982. Face was an all-star from 1959 to 1961 and the first pitcher to save three games in the World Series (versus New York Yankees).

== Further information ==
- 1876 – Atlas of the Cities of Pittsburgh, Allegheny, and the Adjoining Boroughs. Philadelphia: G.M. Hopkins & Co., 1876.
- 1903 – Eastern Vicinity of Pittsburgh. Philadelphia: G.M. Hopkins & Co., 1903.
- Bureau of Social Research—Federation of Social Agencies of Pittsburgh and Allegheny County and Allegheny Conference on Community Development. Recreational Facilities Pittsburgh and Allegheny County, Volume III, Minor Civil Divisions: McKees Rocks to Wilmerding. Pittsburgh: by the author, 1947.
- Fleming, George Thornton. History of Pittsburgh & Environs, Volume III. New York: American Historical Society, 1922.
- Sokol, John L. (Szarc, John J. ed.) North Versailles 100th Anniversary. North Versailles, PA: by the author, 1970.
- Warrantee Atlas of Allegheny County, Pennsylvania. Philadelphia: G.M. Hopkins & Co., 1914.
