= Purple Belt =

Purple Belt may refer to the following:

- Purple belt, a rank in martial arts (see Kyū)
  - Purple belt (Brazilian Jiu-Jitsu), a level in the Brazilian jiu-jitsu ranking system
- A road in the Allegheny County belt system.
