= Crooked Run (Monongahela River tributary) =

Coordinates: 40°21′21″N 79°50′44″W

Crooked Run Creek is a tributary of the Monongahela River southeast of Pittsburgh, Pennsylvania. It runs for 3.2 miles (5.1 km), from its origin in North Versailles Township (near the intersection of Crooked Run and Foster roads) until its mouth at the Monongahela River in McKeesport (under the McKeesport-Duquesne Bridge).

== See also ==
- List of rivers of Pennsylvania
