= South Versailles Township, Pennsylvania =

Township in Pennsylvania, United States

Coordinates: 40°18′N 79°48′W

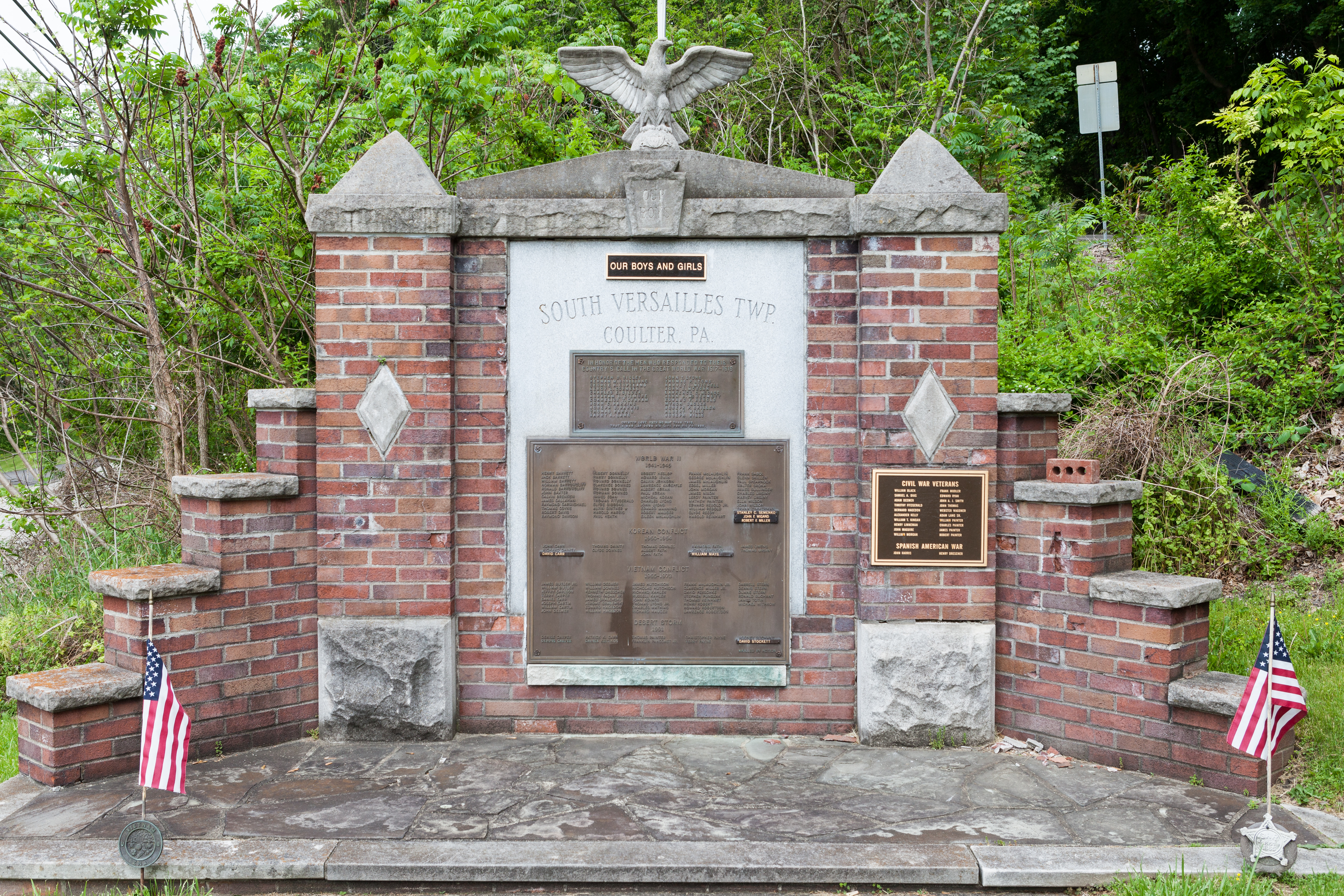
Veterans Memorial in the village of Coulter

Location in Allegheny County and state of Pennsylvania

South Versailles Township is a township in Allegheny County, Pennsylvania, United States. The population was 351 at the 2010 census. It contains the village of Coulter, also called Coulterville or Coulters. The U.S. Post Office in the village is called Coulters.

== History ==
South Versailles Township was formed on September 18, 1869, by a division of old Versailles Township into the townships of North Versailles and South Versailles. In 1875, the second precinct of South Versailles separated to form a new Versailles Township, leaving South Versailles with only a small area around the villages of Coulter, Osceola (also known as Emblem), and Alpsville. These villages were coal mining communities from about 1850 until the coal was depleted in about 1910. Alpsville and Osceola have since vanished.

== Geography ==
The township is a narrow strip of land located on the right (east) bank of the Youghiogheny River, between it and the Westmoreland County line. It contains the village of Coulter and a couple of small coal strip mines.

According to the United States Census Bureau, the township has a total area of 1.0 square mile (2.6 km^{2}), of which 0.9 square miles (2.3 km^{2}) is land and 0.1 square miles (0.26 km^{2}), or 12.24%, is water.

== Government and politics ==
Presidential election results
Year	Republican	Democratic	Third parties
2020	74% 143	24% 46	1% 2
2016	76% 119	24% 37	1% 1
2012	62% 96	37% 57	1% 1

== Surrounding and adjacent neighborhoods ==
South Versailles has two land borders with White Oak to the north and North Huntingdon Township in Westmoreland County to the east. Across the Youghiogheny River to the west, South Versailles runs adjacent with Elizabeth Township.

== Demographics ==
Historical population
Census	Pop.	Note	%±
2010	351		—
2018 (est.)	339		−3.4%
U.S. Decennial Census

As of the 2000 census, there were 351 people, 151 households, and 107 families residing in the township. The population density was 407.6 inhabitants per square mile (157.4/km^{2}). There were 162 housing units at an average density of 188.1 per square mile (72.6/km^{2}). The racial makeup of the township was 100.00% White. Hispanic or Latino of any race were 0.28% of the population.

There were 151 households, out of which 23.8% had children under the age of 18 living with them, 54.3% were married couples living together, 11.3% had a female householder with no husband present, and 29.1% were non-families. 26.5% of all households were made up of individuals, and 14.6% had someone living alone who was 65 years of age or older. The average household size was 2.32 and the average family size was 2.81.

In the township the population was spread out, with 18.8% under the age of 18, 6.6% from 18 to 24, 23.1% from 25 to 44, 25.4% from 45 to 64, and 26.2% who were 65 years of age or older. The median age was 46 years. For every 100 females, there were 98.3 males. For every 100 females age 18 and over, there were 97.9 males.

The median income for a household in the township was $33,125, and the median income for a family was $42,500. Males had a median income of $35,625 versus $22,292 for females. The per capita income for the township was $16,414. About 5.8% of families and 8.9% of the population were below the poverty line, including 14.1% of those under age 18 and 2.2% of those age 65 or over.

== Notable people ==
- Joe "Moon" Harris, a Major League Baseball player in the early 20th century, was born in Coulter, which is a part of South Versailles.
- Art Rooney, founder of the Pittsburgh Steelers, was born in Coulter.
