= Boston Bridge =

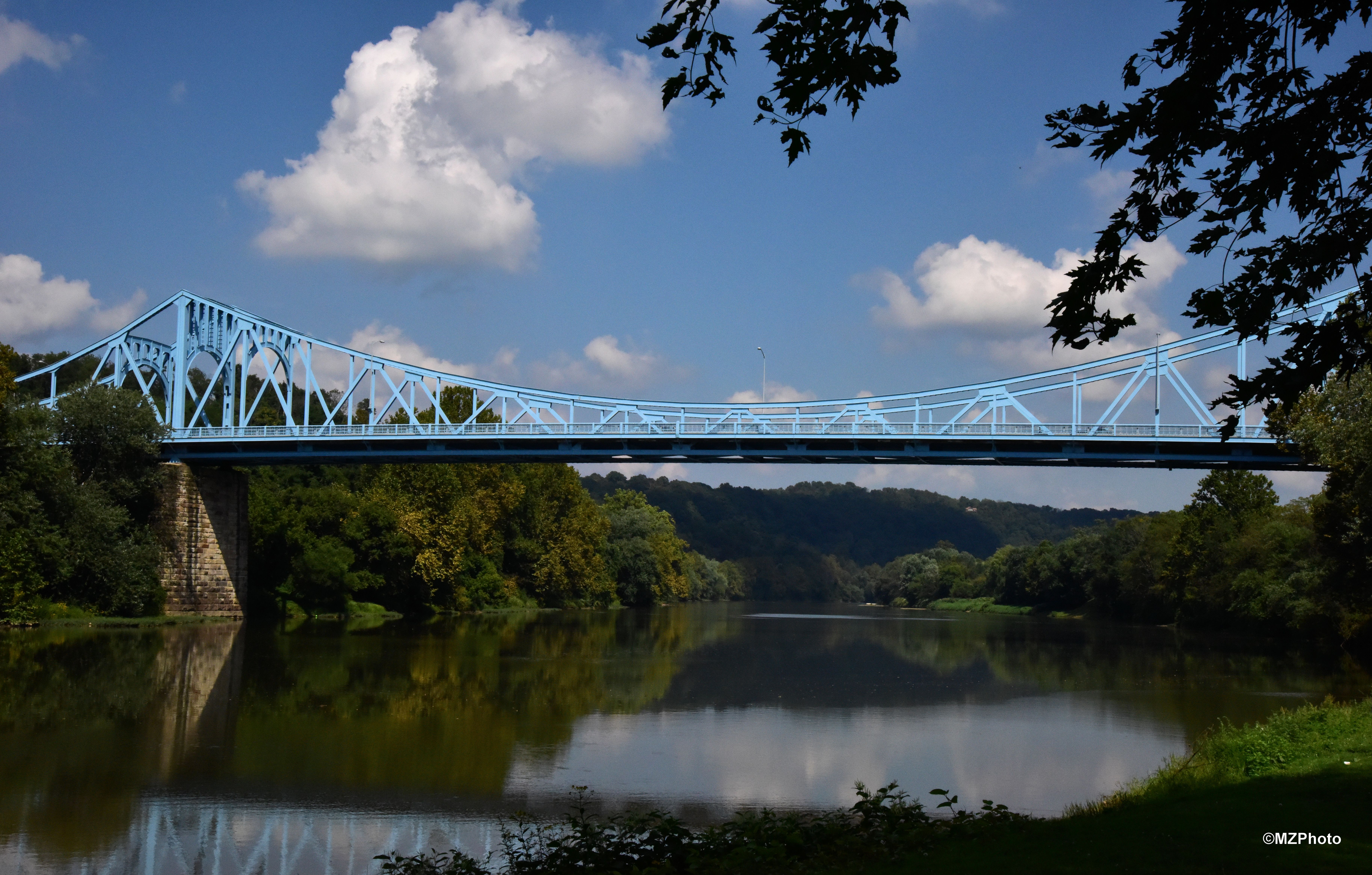
- Boston Bridge in September 2014.
- Coordinates: 40°18′46″N 79°49′42″W
- Carries: PA 48
- Crosses: Youghiogheny River
- Locale: Versailles and Elizabeth Township, Pennsylvania

Characteristics
- Design: cantilever bridge
- Total length: 1181 f
- Width: 30 ft

History
- Opened: October 13, 1932

The Boston Bridge is a structure that crosses the Youghiogheny River between Versailles and Elizabeth Township, Pennsylvania. Its name is derived from the Massachusetts city only indirectly: the bridge is named for the Boston neighborhood of Elizabeth Township, which in turn was named for the New England city.

The bridge, which opened on October 13, 1932, carries Pennsylvania Route 48 on two relatively narrow lanes. Many of its features were carefully preserved during a 1989 rehabilitation, down to its original pedestrian railings. Designed entirely for vehicular traffic, the structure changed the future of Elizabeth Township; the lack of streetcar tracks led to the abandonment of a line that served the then-rural community's small industrial settlements, while the newfound ease of access for motorists to the area's manufacturing regions opened up the township to suburbanization.
