= Pittsburgh Wayfinder System =

The Pittsburgh Wayfinder map symbol, which is present on nearly all signs in the system, is a stylized neighborhood map of the city of Pittsburgh.

The Pittsburgh Wayfinder System is a series of directional and destination signs installed throughout the City of Pittsburgh, Pennsylvania meant to guide travelers to popular destinations and services. The system is designed for easy mapping of neighborhood-to-neighborhood routes with the intent of creating a coherent pattern of travel in the city.

== History ==
In 1993, city leaders asked Informing Design, a Pittsburgh-based design firm, to create a sign system for Pittsburgh's notoriously confusing network of streets. The signs were designed by graphic designer Martine Bruel in collaboration with Bob Firth, the founding principal of the firm. Since its implementation in 1995 and 1996, the system has been actively maintained and expanded to reflect additions and changes in Pittsburgh's road system.

== Composition ==
The Pittsburgh Wayfinder System is composed of more than 1,500 traffic signs, and nearly all of the city's eighty neighborhoods are covered by the system.

The system divides the city into five regions and assigns each a color:

• North Side	(light blue)
• South Side	(green)
• Downtown	(purple)
• Strip District/Lawrenceville	(brown)
• East End	(orange)

The dark blue stripes on the Wayfarer map symbol indicate the Ohio, Monongahela, and Allegheny Rivers, which form the main navigational landmarks for the city. The signs are maintained by the City of Pittsburgh Department of Engineering and Construction.

== Signage ==
The system is made up of two types of sign: "Exit-Finder" signs, which provide directional assistance, and "Site-Finder" signs, which denote particular destinations. The system also includes a "Purple Belt" for easy navigation in the downtown area, as well as directional signs to hospitals and parking facilities.

=== Exit-Finder signs ===

The dark blue background of Exit-Finder signs serve to differentiate them from the majority of Pennsylvania guide signs, which typically have a green background.

When an Exit-Finder sign is located in the same zone as the destination, the background of the sign matches the color for that zone, and an arrow in the dark blue band at the bottom of the sign points the way to the destination. If destination in question is in a different zone than the one in which the sign is located, a color-coded stripe on an Exit-Finder sign denotes this fact. A variation on the sign occurs when the directional sign gives information on highways or roads, without pointing to a specific destination. These signs have the dark blue background, but do not include the Wayfinder symbol. The diagram to the right demonstrates an Exit-Finder sign, with the Wayfinder map symbol and a color-coded stripe. (Note: This example of an Exit-Finder gives information on the location of Bigelow Boulevard, while also pointing the way to neighborhoods in the East End. The actual sign on which this image is based is located at the intersection of Fifth Avenue and Washington Place, near Duquesne University. See the Google Maps streetview.)

=== Site-Finder signs ===
Site-Finder signs are found directly in front of their locations. The background of the sign matches the color of the region, and a star indicates that the destination has been reached.

=== Purple Belt ===

The Purple Belt is the innermost colored belt in the Allegheny County belt system, running through downtown Pittsburgh. Unlike the other belts, however, it was established in 1995 along with the Wayfinder System. The Purple Belt sign has the blue background of other Exit-Finder signs, and the purple dot matches the color of the downtown region.

The belt travels in a loop on four two-way streets—Stanwix Street, Fort Duquesne Boulevard / 11th Street, Grant Street and Boulevard of the Allies. (In the counter-clockwise direction, it follows Smithfield Street and 4th Avenue to bypass the left turn from Boulevard of the Allies onto Grant Street, which is prohibited at certain times.) This lies inside the area bounded by the Allegheny River, Interstate 579, Interstate 376 and Interstate 279.

=== Parking and hospital signs ===
The Wayfarer system also features signs that point to parking or hospitals. Parking signs have a "P" for parking, while hospital signs have an "H". The background colors of these signs match the color code for the region.

== Notes and references ==
Notes
