= Boston, Pennsylvania =

Unincorporated community in Pennsylvania, US

Coordinates: 40°18′43″N 79°49′23″W

- CDP
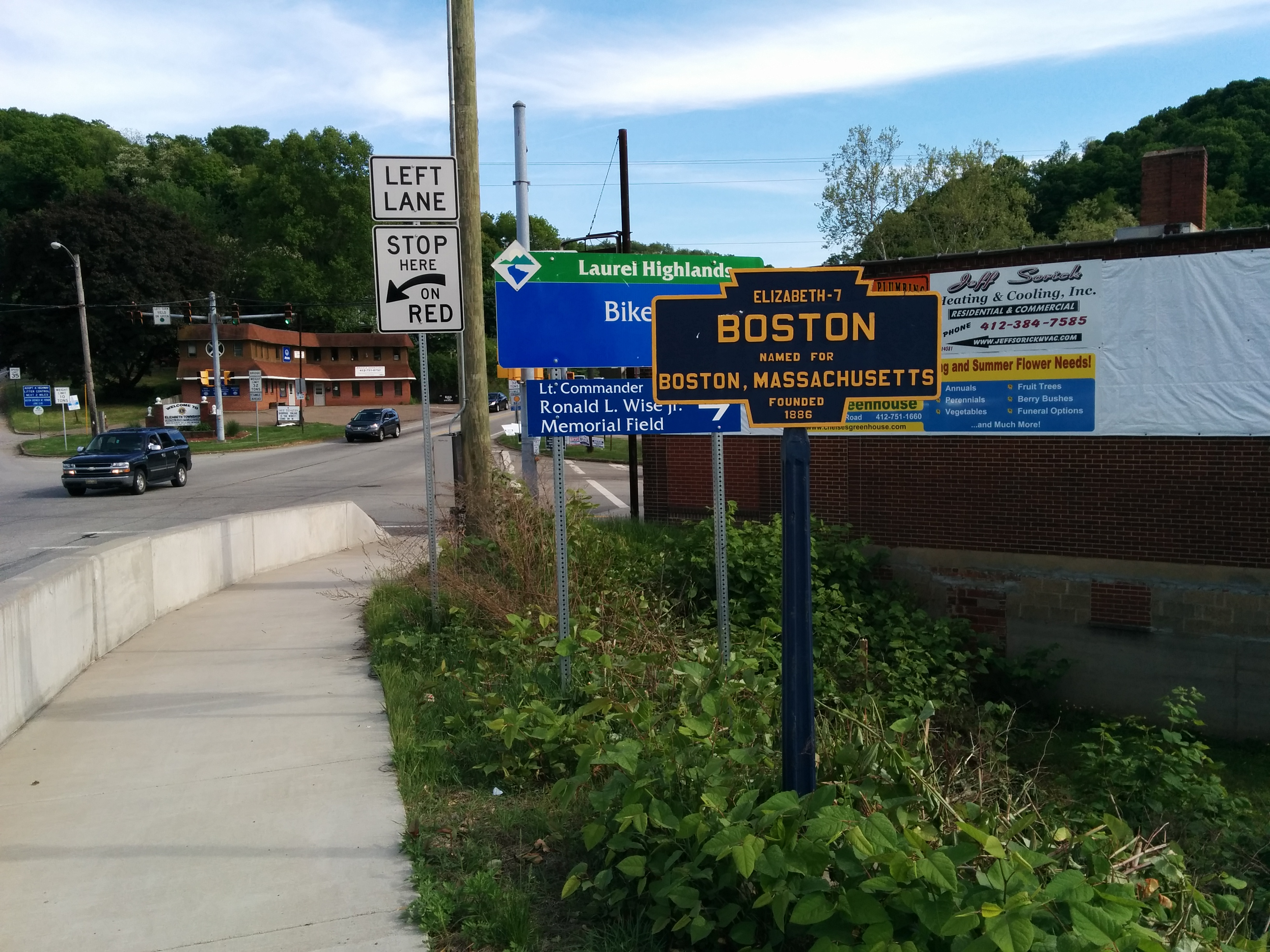
- Keystone marker on the Boston Bridge
- Interactive map of Boston, Pennsylvania
- Country: United States
- State: Pennsylvania
- County: Allegheny

Area
  - Total: 0.36 sq mi (0.94 km^{2})
  - Land: 0.33 sq mi (0.85 km^{2})
  - Water: 0.035 sq mi (0.09 km^{2})

Population (2020)
  - Total: 549
  - Density: 1,668.5/sq mi (644.23/km^{2})
- Time zone: UTC-5 (Eastern (EST))
  - Summer (DST): UTC-4 (EDT)
- ZIP codes: 15135
- FIPS code: 42-07688

Boston (occasionally referred to as "Little Boston" to distinguish it from the Massachusetts capital city) is a census-designated place located in Elizabeth Township, Allegheny County, Pennsylvania. As of the 2020 census the population was 549.

== History ==
Boston was named by a brother of Mr Duncan, of the firm of Duncan, Cornell & Co, who first established the coalworks here around 1845.

At the site of modern-day Boston, during the times of the French and Indian War, (1754-1763) there stood a stockade or fortification, serving as a refuge for local settlers during times of danger. The outline of the redoubt was clearly traceable until roughly 1850.

Saltworks were in operation at the site of Boston but had been long since suspended by the year 1889. J. D. Williams operated a saw mill here in the 19th century between what is now the Boston ball field and the Youghiogheny River. The first Boston Bridge was built in 1893, prior to that, Elrods Ferry carried traffic across the river. The current bridge was built in 1931-1932.

== Demographics ==
Historical population
Census	Pop.	Note	%±
2020	549		—
U.S. Decennial Census
