= East Allegheny School District =

School district in Allegheny County, Pennsylvania, United States

Address
- 1150 Jacks Run Road North Versailles, Allegheny County, Pennsylvania, 15137-2797; United States

District information
- Type: Public
- Established: 1969

Students and staff
- District mascot: Wildcats
- Colors: Blue, Yellow

Other information
- Website: www.eawildcats.net

Map of Allegheny County, Pennsylvania Public School Districts. East Allegheny School District (green) is shown in the lower right-hand corner.

The East Allegheny School District is a small, suburban, public school district covering the Boroughs of East McKeesport, Wall and Wilmerding and North Versailles Township in Allegheny County, Pennsylvania. The district encompasses approximately 5 square miles (13 km^{2}). According to 2000 federal census data, it served a resident population of 16,340. By 2010, the district's population declined to 15,128 people. In 2009, the residents' per capita income was $16,497, while the median family income was $37,169. In the Commonwealth, the median family income was $49,501 and the United States median family income was $49,445, in 2010.

East Allegheny School District operates East Allegheny High School (9th-12th), East Allegheny Junior High (7th-8th ), and Logan Elementary (K-6th). The district is one of the 500 public school districts of Pennsylvania.

== Extracurriculars ==
East Allegheny School District offers a variety of clubs, activities, and an extensive sports program.

=== Sports ===
High School Varsity

Boys

- Baseball - AA
- Basketball - AAA
- Bowling - AAAA
- Football - AA
- Golf - AA
- Soccer - AA
- Swimming and Diving - AA
- Track and Field - AA

Girls

- Basketball - AA
- Bowling AAAA
- Soccer (Fall) AA
- Softball - AA
- Swimming and Diving AA
- Track and Field AA
- Volleyball - AA

Middle School:

Boys

- Basketball
- Football
- Soccer
- Track and Field

Girls

- Basketball
- Soccer (Fall)
- Softball
- Track and Field
- Volleyball

- According to PIAA directory July 2012
