= Allegheny County belt system =

Road design in Pennsylvania, US

Allegheny County Belt System
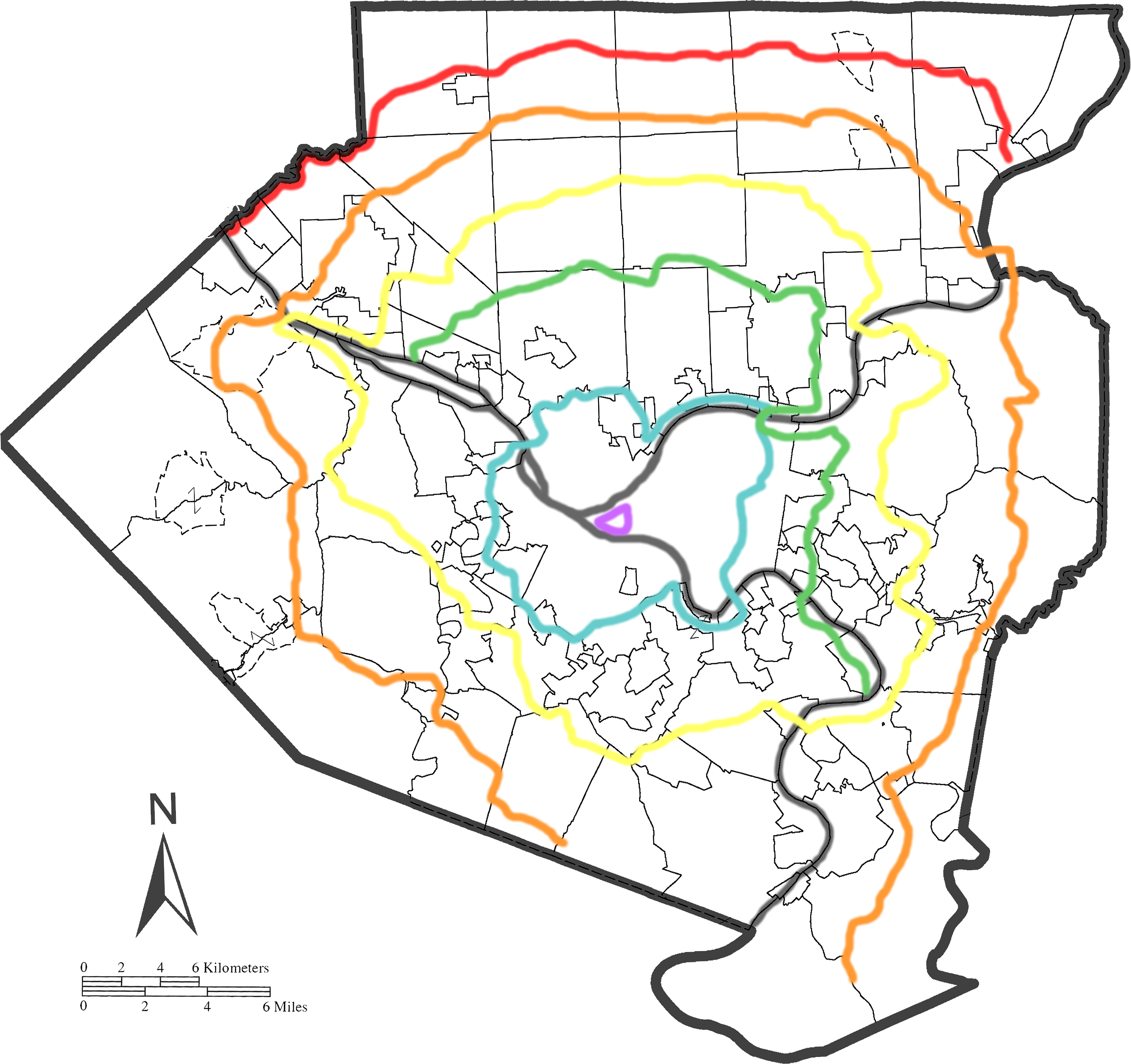
- Static map of Allegheny County with the system Red Belt Orange Belt Yellow Belt Green Belt Blue Belt Purple Belt (River)

System information
- Maintained by ACDPW, PennDOT and city agencies
- Length: 280.5 mi (451.4 km)

Highway names
- Interstates: Interstate nn (I-nn)
- US Highways: U.S. Route nn (US nn)
- State: Pennsylvania Route nn (PA nn)

The Allegheny County Belt System color codes various county roads to form a unique system of routes in Allegheny County, Pennsylvania, and around the city of Pittsburgh.

Unlike many major American cities with belt systems composed of number-coded limited-access roads, the Allegheny County Belt System roads are not intended to be used as high-speed routes. Rather, the system is a navigational aid for motorists in unfamiliar portions of the county. Five routes were introduced in the early 1950s: from outermost to innermost, the Red, Orange, Yellow, Green, and Blue Belts. The Purple Belt was added later. All roads in the system retain their original names.

== History ==
The Allegheny County Belt System was developed in the late 1940s by Joseph White, an engineer with the Allegheny County Department of Public Works, as a wayfarer system using a network of federal, state, and municipal roads to offer residents alternative traffic patterns that did not lead to downtown Pittsburgh's congested Golden Triangle.

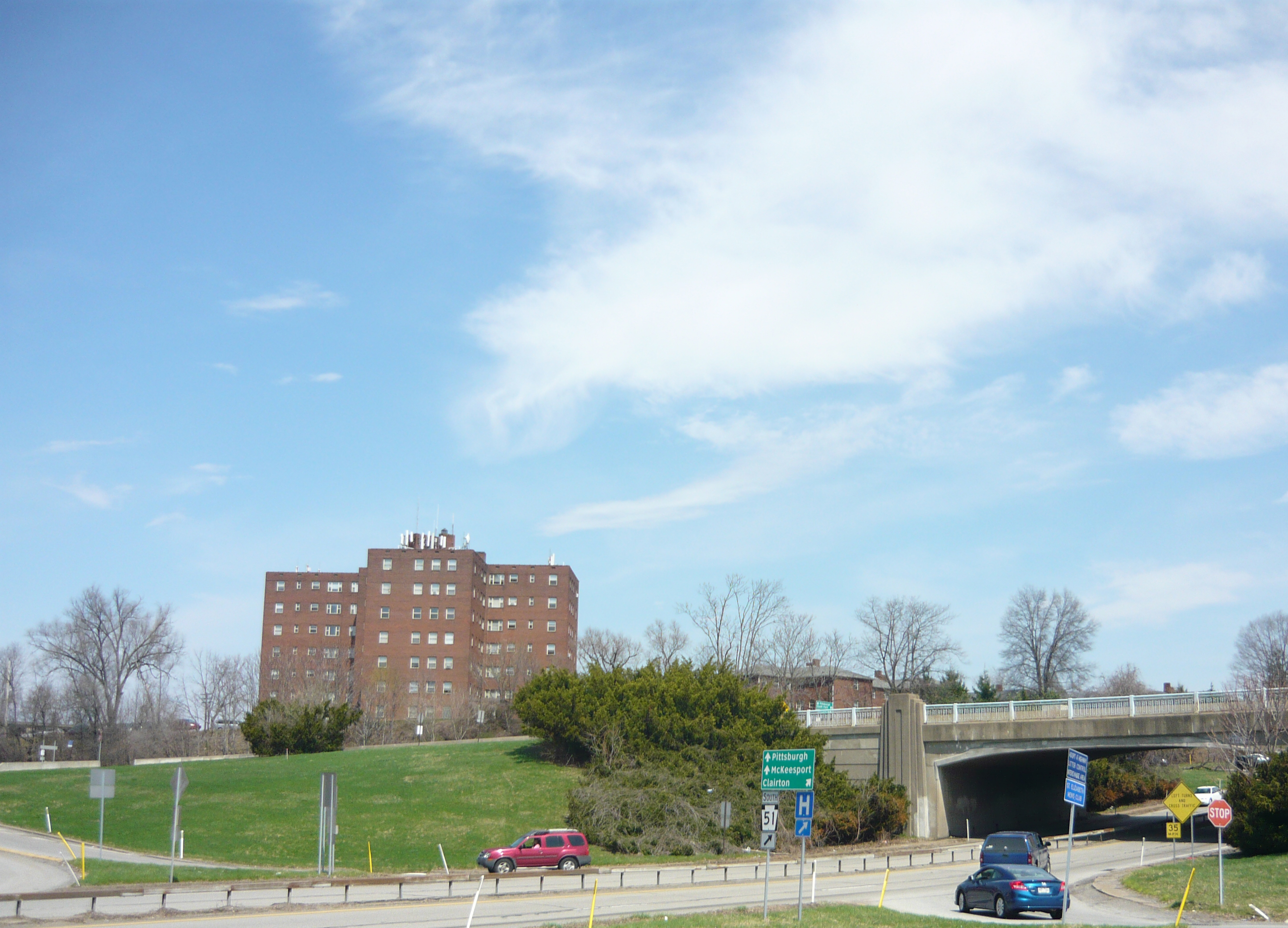
Yellow Belt at PA 51

From late 1951 to early 1952, the signs were posted throughout the finalized belt routes, starting with the Orange route, then Blue, Yellow, Red and Green.

The belt routes were not intended as high-speed or limited-access roads, but instead as a well-defined road system away from the existing major arterials and their congestion.

The construction of the Interstate Highway System and regional parkways during the late 1950s through the early 1970s initially reduced the use and need of the belt routes. As urbanization of the county spread further out from the City of Pittsburgh, however, the Belt System helped reduce suburban congestion. Many of the roads selected in the mid-20th century today play key roles in the long-range regional transportation plans of Allegheny County. Many of the roads chosen for the belts have been converted from simple country lanes to urban collector roads and to urban arterials.

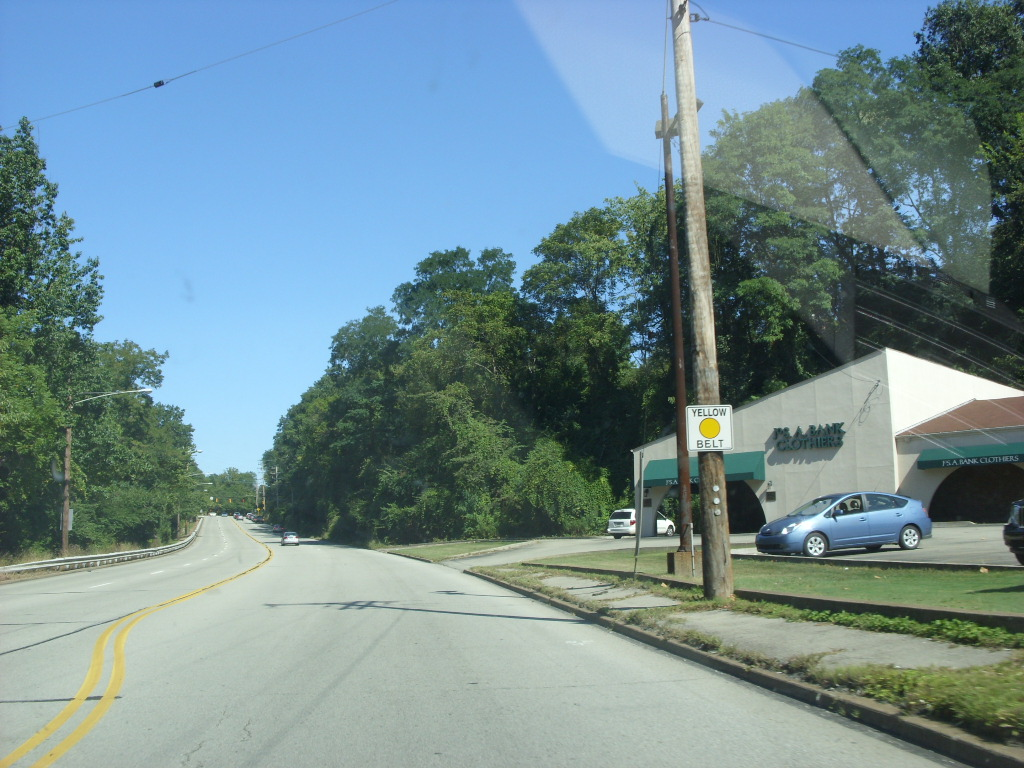
Segment of the Yellow Belt following Connor Road in Mt. Lebanon

In its millennium edition, Pittsburgh Magazine (published by WQED television) recognized White as one of the one hundred most influential people of the 20th century in the Pittsburgh region. Rick Sebak of WQED television also produced a local feature on the Allegheny County Belt System in the 1990s.

In the mid-1990s, the City of Pittsburgh developed a Purple Belt for the downtown area using the county system as a guideline.

A sign from the belt system is a featured Pittsburgh landmark on Yinztagram.

As of 2014, Pittsburgh does not have a true beltway, although the partially completed Southern Beltway is currently under construction as a partial beltway. Opponents of a full beltway have suggested residents should use the belt system, although some have said that the city doesn't promote it enough and wonder why signage for it is still maintained.

== Composition ==
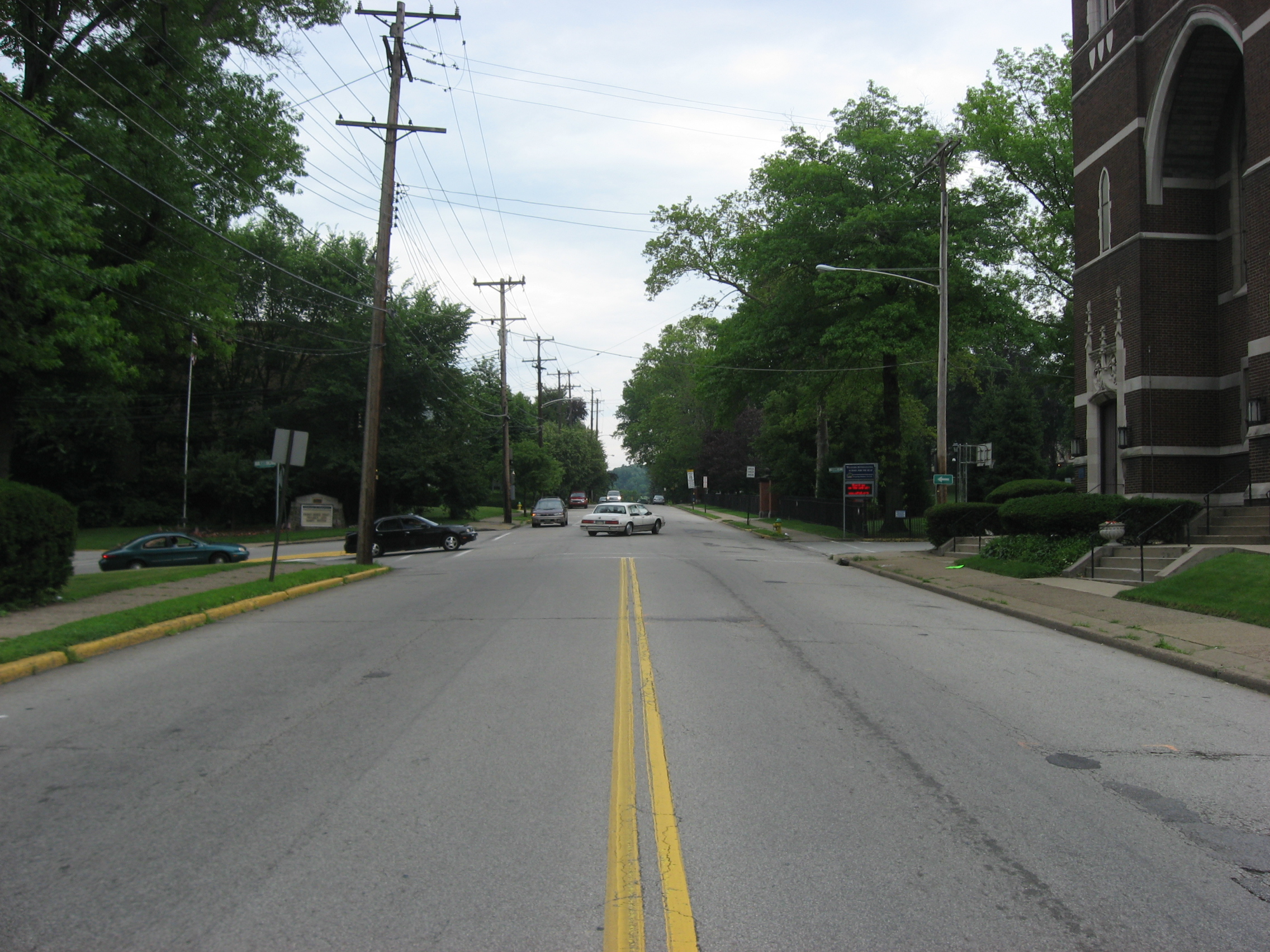
Green Belt in Edgewood

The Belt System consists of six beltways. The Purple, Blue, Green, Yellow, Orange, and Red Belts travel distances of 2 miles (3.2 km), 38 miles (61 km), 39 miles (63 km), 78 miles (126 km), 92 miles (148 km), and 34 miles (55 km), respectively. The Purple, Blue, and Yellow belts are complete loop routes, beginning and ending at the same points. The Orange Belt was a complete loop until 12 miles (19 km) of the southernmost stretch (including its entire stretch through Washington County) was decommissioned in the 1970s to keep the belt system entirely in Allegheny County. It still briefly traverses Westmoreland County in New Kensington.

Before its 1980 acquisition by the Chevron Corporation, the PIttsburgh-based Gulf Oil Corporation published a map of Allegheny County prominently displaying the Belt System.

Allegheny County produces maps featuring the Belt System.

== Descriptions of the Belts ==
=== Red Belt ===
Red Belt
- Location: PA 65 in Leetsdale to 7th Avenue in Tarentum
- Length: 33.5 mi (53.9 km)

The Red Belt is the outermost belt in the system. Unlike the other belts in the system, the Red Belt does not make a part of a complete loop—instead, it runs entirely east–west across the northernmost part of Allegheny County.

The current Red Belt is 33.5 miles (53.9 km) long and runs through largely rural communities. Going from west to east, it begins at the intersection of PA 65 and Cross Street in Leetsdale (just south of the Allegheny–Beaver County line) and ends at the intersection of PA 366 and East 7th Avenue in Tarentum. The Red Belt briefly enters Beaver County in two places where it crosses to the north bank of Big Sewickley Creek. Unlike other belts in the system, most of which access many state highways, the Red Belt only intersects numbered highways at its endpoints, along with US 19 in Marshall Township, PA 8 in Richland Township, and Interstate 79 just below Butler County. Much of the route is rural. The largest suburban sprawl along the route has occurred between US 19 and PA 8.

==== Decommissioned Red Belt segments ====
Both ends of the Red Belt originally ran outside of Allegheny County and were truncated to their current termini in 1974. As a result, it's the only belt in the system not to cross any of Allegheny County's main rivers.

Western end: Began at the PA 51 end of the Ambridge-Aliquippa Bridge in Aliquippa/Beaver County, ran across the bridge (Ohio River) to 11th Street in Ambridge, right on Duss Avenue, right on 8th Street, left on PA 65 South into Allegheny County, and left on Cross Street in Leetsdale where the current Red Belt begins eastbound

Eastern end: Began at the intersection of Leechburg and Freeport Roads at PA 366 in New Kensington/Westmoreland County and ran along PA 366 West, across the Tarentum Bridge (Allegheny River) into Allegheny County and continuing where the current Red Belt begins westbound

=== Orange Belt ===
Orange Belt
- Location: PA 88 in Bethel Park to PA 51 in Forward Township
- Length: 91.7 mi (147.6 km)

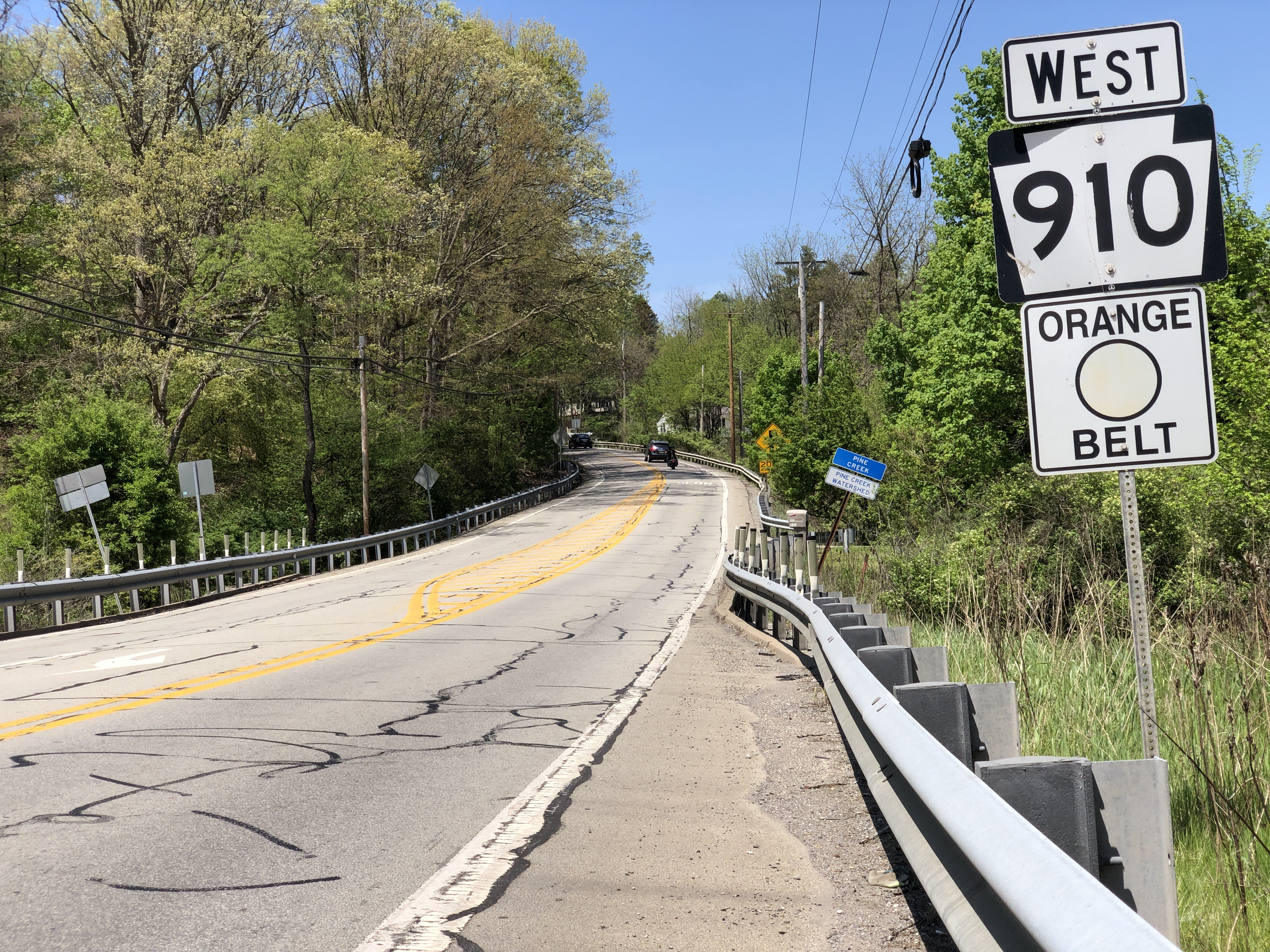
Orange Belt along PA 910 westbound in Marshall Township

The Orange Belt is longest belt in the system, running 91.7 miles (147.6 km). For most of its route, it is the outermost route in the system, except for the north of the county, where the Red Belt runs. The Orange Belt was originally a complete circle until a 12-mile (19 km) stretch in the south from Bethel Park to Forward Township was decommissioned (See decommissioned Orange Belt segment below).

The current Orange Belt runs through the northern, eastern, southern, and western sections of the county, connecting four county parks (including South Park and North Park) and the Pittsburgh International Airport. It stretches from its southwestern terminus at PA 88 in Bethel Park northwest to Moon Township and Sewickley, then northeast to Richland Township and West Deer Township, southeast to Plum and Monroeville, and finally southwest to its southeastern terminus at PA 51 in Elizabeth. Much of the route was previously rural, though suburban sprawl has placed it in many prominent commercial corridors.

The Orange Belt crosses or joins many Pennsylvania routes, including the entirety of PA 48, PA 50, PA 51, PA 56, PA 88, PA 366, PA 380, PA 910, and PA 978. It also crosses or joins Interstate 376 Business, I-376, US 22 and US 30 in two areas.

Of the four major rivers in Allegheny County, the Orange Belt crosses three: Ohio River via Sewickley Bridge between Sewickley and Moon Township, Allegheny River via C.L. Schmitt Bridge between New Kensington and East Deer Township, and Youghiogheny River via Boston Bridge between Versailles and Elizabeth Township.

For 1.5 miles (2.4 km), the Orange Belt briefly enters Westmoreland County from the C.L. Schmitt (New Kensington) Bridge to the county line on Logan's Ferry Road (formerly PA 909).

==== Decommissioned Orange Belt segment ====
The original Orange Belt completed a 121-mile (195 km) circle by crossing into Washington County, but the southernmost stretch from Bethel Park to Forward Township, including the entire 8.5-mile (13.7 km) Washington County segment, was removed by early 1973 to keep the Belt system within the Allegheny County border (with the exceptions of the brief stretch of this belt in Westmoreland County and two short segments of the Red Belt in Beaver County).

Starting at the intersection of Library and Clifton Roads in Bethel Park where the Orange Belt currently terminates from the southwest, the former segment begins at PA 88 South through Library and Finleyville (Washington County), then continues left onto Washington Avenue / Finleyville–Elrama Road, left onto PA 837 North (back into Allegheny County), and right onto PA 51 South for 2 miles (3.2 km) to the current southeastern terminus at PA 48 North.

Originally, the Orange and Yellow Belts were the only two in the system to cross all four major Allegheny County rivers. Today, only the latter carries that distinction as the former's decommissioned segment includes the crossing of the Monongahela River via Malady Bridge (PA 51) between Elizabeth and West Elizabeth.

=== Yellow Belt ===
Yellow Belt
- Location: Pittsburgh
- Length: 77.6 mi (124.9 km)

The Yellow Belt is one of two belts, along with the Blue Belt, to make a complete loop around the city, over a distance of 77.6 miles (124.9 km) through the northern, eastern, southern, and western sectors of the county. For several miles in the southern part of the county, it is the outermost of the belts.

The Yellow Belt stretches from its southernmost point in South Park, north and west to the border of Moon, north and east to Hampton and West Deer, and east as far as the border to Penn Hills/Plum before returning to the start. It crosses or follows PA 50, PA 51, PA 60, PA 65, PA 88, PA 121, PA 130, PA 148, PA 380, PA 791, and PA 910. It also crosses or follows US 19 and US 22. It crosses the Neville Island Bridge and the Mansfield Bridge.

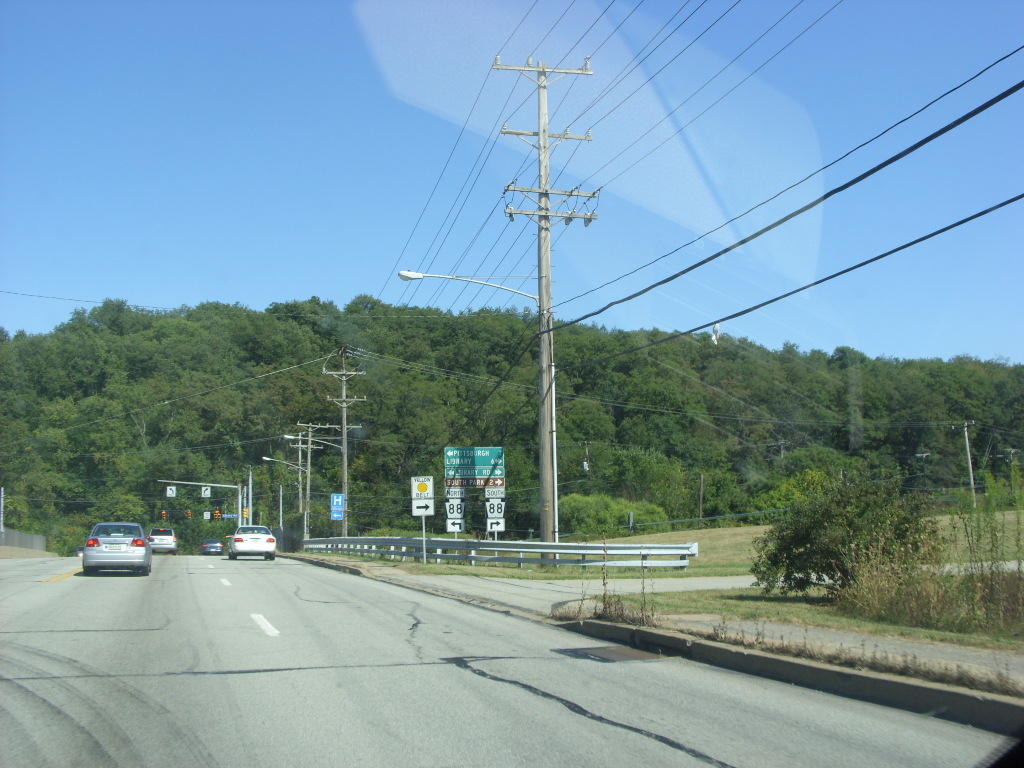
Yellow Belt signage on Connor Rd. near the Castle Shannon borough/Bethel Park borough line, approaching PA 88

Until 2010, when PA 60 was renumbered I-376 beginning in Robinson Township (which includes a segment of the Orange Belt), the Yellow Belt had the distinction of being the only belt in the system with a segment situated on an Interstate Highway. Starting in Neville Township at Exit 65—Neville Island, the Yellow Belt runs concurrently along I-79 for four miles northbound to Exit 68—Mount Nebo Road along the border of Sewickley Hills and Ohio Township.

Curry Hollow Road composes a part of the Yellow Belt to the south of Pittsburgh. It connects with Lebanon Church Road at Pennsylvania Route 51 in Pleasant Hills, Pennsylvania, connecting Clairton Boulevard (PA 51) with Broughton Road, which connects with Pennsylvania Route 88 and Bethel Church Road. Curry Hollow was a former town along this road, where it crosses the CSX railroad tracks next to Jefferson Memorial Park. East of PA 51, the Yellow Belt becomes Lebanon Church Road and crosses Pennsylvania Route 885 in West Mifflin, Pennsylvania, connecting Clairton Boulevard (PA 51) with Pittsburgh-McKeesport Boulevard. The Allegheny County Airport is on the road. Both Curry Hollow Road and Lebanon Church Road are signed as SR 3048.

The Yellow Belt is also the only belt in the system to cross all four Allegheny County rivers: Ohio River via Coraopolis Bridge between Coraopolis and Neville Island, Monongahela River via Mansfield Bridge between Dravosburg and McKeesport, Youghiogheny River via Jerome Street Bridge in McKeesport and Allegheny River via Hulton Bridge between Harmar and Oakmont (The Orange Belt also had this distinction until its southernmost segment which crossed the Monongahela River was decommissioned)

=== Green Belt ===
Green Belt
- Location: PA 65 in Emsworth to PA 148 in McKeesport
- Length: 38.6 mi (62.1 km)

The Green Belt forms a half-circle around the city, with a length of 38.6 miles (62.1 km), through suburban communities in the northern and eastern sectors of the county. (The gap is due to geographic concerns rather than intersecting with other counties, as is the case with the Red and Orange Belts.)

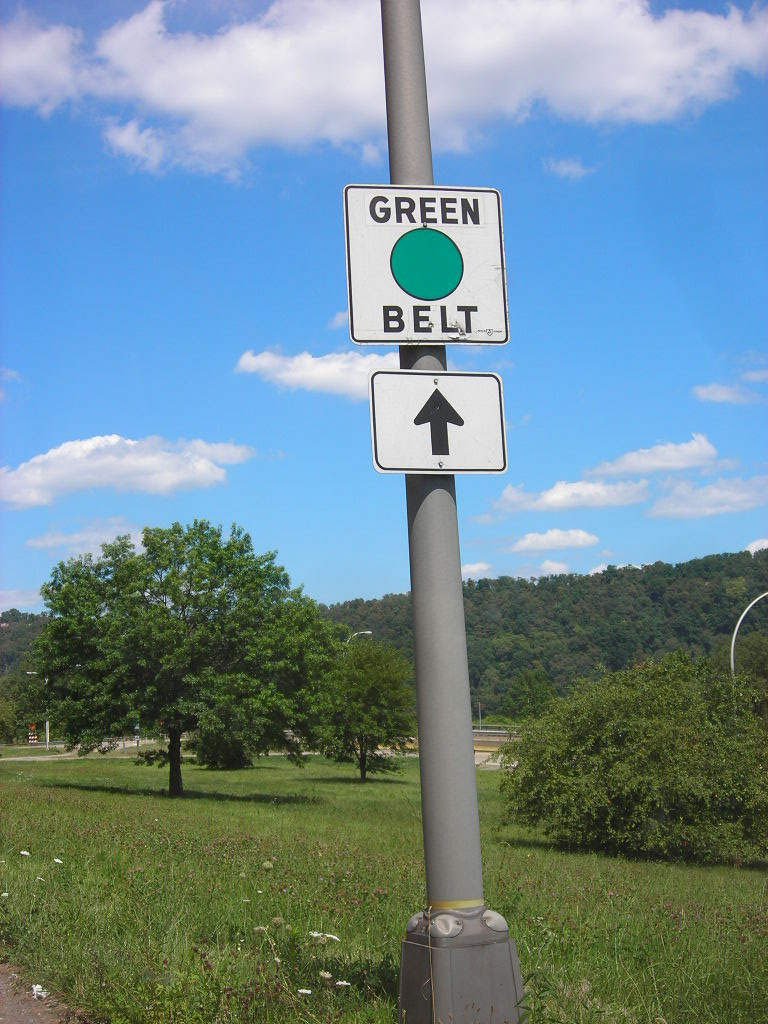
Green Belt on PA 837

The current Green Belt begins eastbound on Camp Horne Road at PA 65 in Emsworth and originally terminated before the Rankin Bridge in Rankin. This was later extended to its current southeastern terminus at PA 148 and the Yellow Belt in McKeesport, giving the Green Belt the distinctions of being the only one in the system to cross the same river (Monongahela) twice and terminate at another belt route. In its path around the city, the belt crosses or joins PA 8 (at its northernmost point in Hampton Township), PA 28, PA 65, PA 130, PA 148, and PA 837. It also briefly joins US 19 in Ross Township.

There are three Green Belt crossings over two of Allegheny County's four rivers. From the northeast, the belt traverses the Allegheny River via the Highland Park Bridge between O'Hara Township and the Pittsburgh neighborhood of Highland Park. Traveling southeast, the Green Belt runs across the Monongahela River via Rankin Bridge between Rankin and Whitaker, down PA 837 South for 5 miles and across the Monongahela again via McKeesport-Duquesne Bridge (between said towns) where it terminates.

The Green Belt runs through many Pittsburgh neighborhoods. Its most notable landmark destinations include Kennywood Park in West Mifflin and the Pittsburgh Zoo in Pittsburgh's Highland Park neighborhood.

=== Blue Belt ===
Blue Belt
- Location: Pittsburgh
- Length: 38.1 mi (61.3 km)

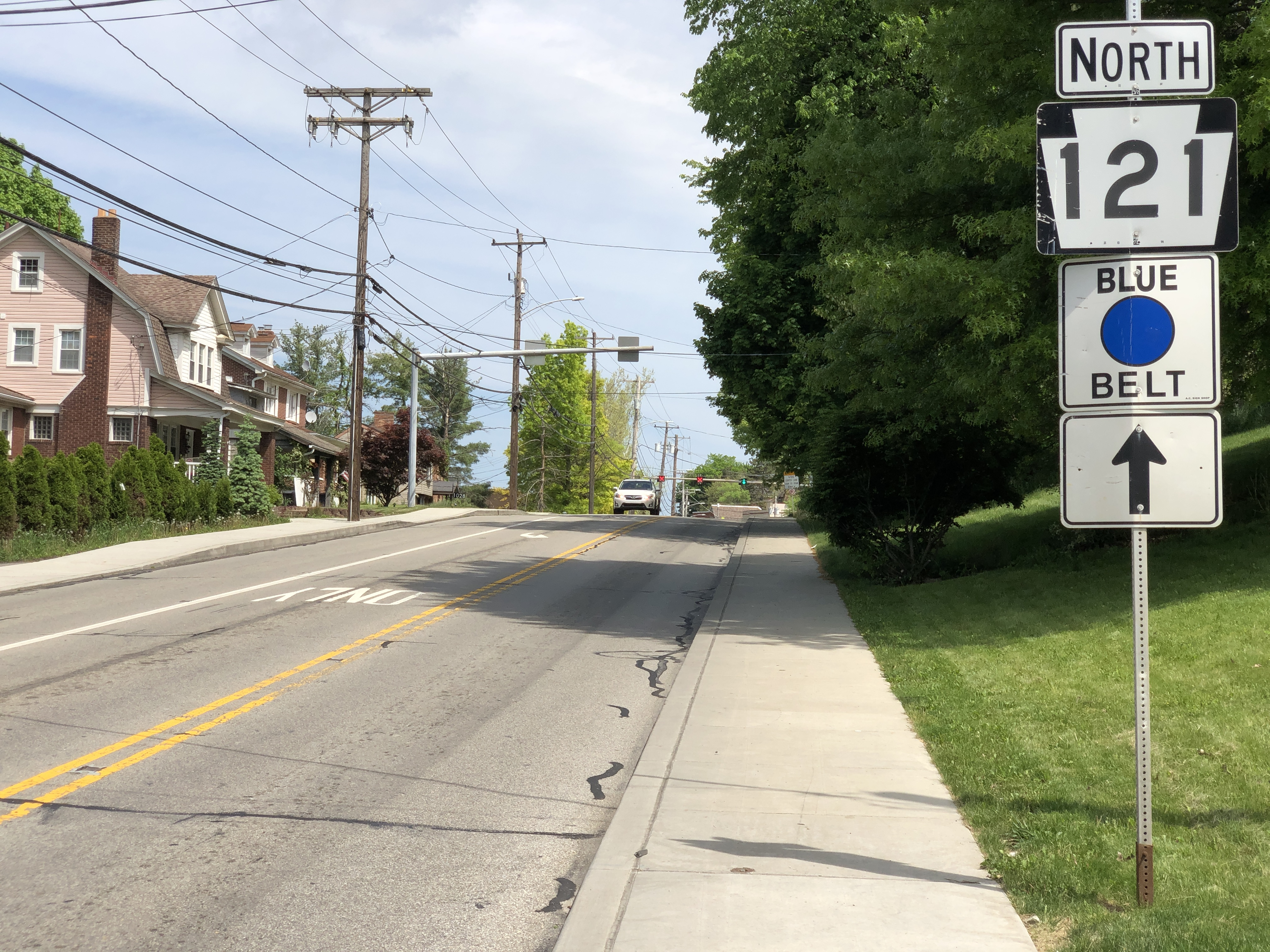
Blue Belt along PA 121 northbound in Green Tree

The Blue Belt is the innermost belt in the original system, making a complete 38.1-mile (61.3 km) circle around the city.

The current Blue Belt runs relatively close to skirting the border of the City of Pittsburgh on all sides, though it does make excursions into border towns such as Dormont and McKees Rocks. It generally serves urban communities in the northern, southern, and eastern sectors of the county. In its path around the city, the belt crosses or joins PA 8, PA 28, PA 51, PA 88, PA 121, and PA 837. It also briefly joins US 19. Only a small portion of the route (on PA 28) is a freeway. The Blue Belt crosses the Ohio River via McKees Rocks Bridge between McKees Rocks and the Brighton Heights neighborhood of Pittsburgh, Allegheny River via Highland Park Bridge between Sharpsburg and the Highland Park neighborhood of Pittsburgh, and Monongahela River via Homestead Grays Bridge between the Pittsburgh neighborhood of Squirrel Hill and Homestead. As of 2016, sections of the Blue Belt have been closed, marked one way, resigned and/or rerouted. Construction and traffic flow are the believed primary causes.

==== Dual Blue/Green Belt segment ====
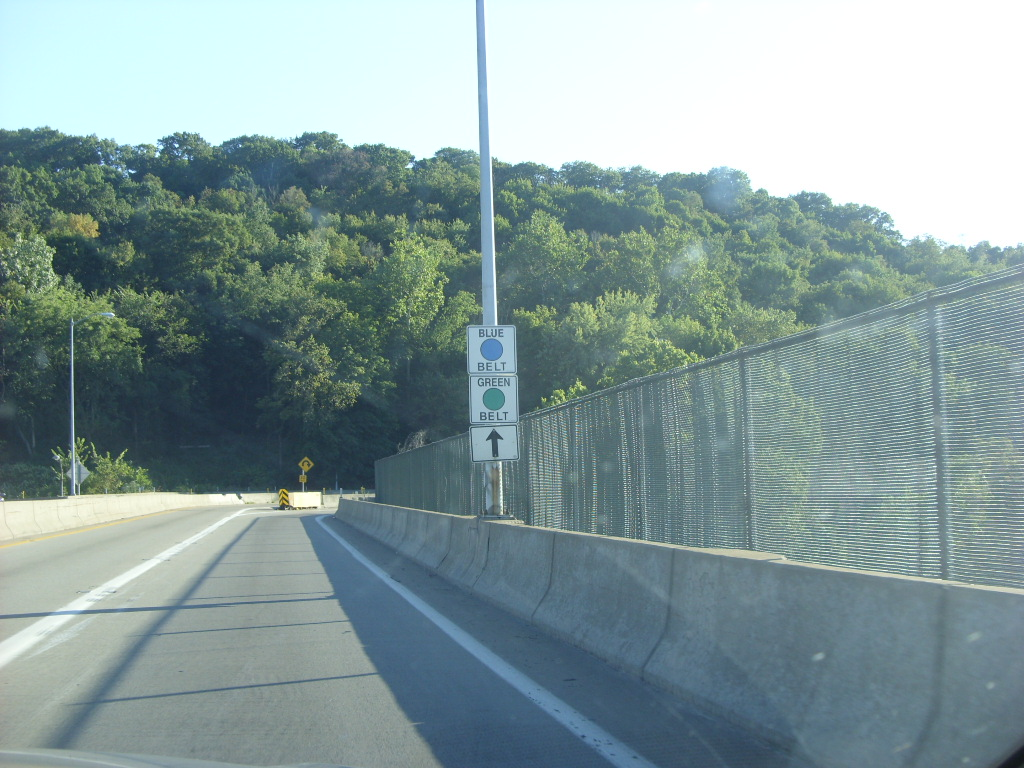
Dual Blue and Green Belt signage at the southern end of the Highland Park Bridge

For one mile in northeastern Pittsburgh, the Blue and Green Belts form the only concurrent segment in the system. The two belts meet (Blue northbound, Green southbound) at the northern end of the Highland Park Bridge off Exit 6 on PA 28. From there, the dual Blue/Green Belt route runs across said bridge, around the loop onto Butler Street/PA 8 South and to the intersection of Allegheny River and Washington Boulevards where the belts split up. Here, the Blue Belt continues with a right-hand turn onto Washington Boulevard/PA 8 South and the Green Belt continues straight on Allegheny River Boulevard/PA 130 East.

=== Purple Belt ===
Purple Belt
- Location: Downtown Pittsburgh
- Length: 2.03 mi (3.27 km)

The Purple Belt is the innermost colored belt in the system, running through downtown Pittsburgh. Unlike the other belts, it was established in 1995 in conjunction with the Pittsburgh Wayfinder System, a color-coded signage system downtown which helps tourists and locals find many of the common destinations in the city. (In the Wayfinder system, downtown destinations are colored purple. None of the other colors in that system correspond to the Belt System colors.) Thus, it uses a different style of signage than the other belts.

Unlike the other belts, the Purple Belt's primary intent is not for navigation around the circumference of the city, but rather to assist in navigation downtown. It is also the only one of the belts to not leave the city at any point. Also, while signage for all of the other belts is maintained by the Allegheny County Department of Public Works, the Purple Belt is maintained by the City of Pittsburgh Department of Mobility and Infrastructure.

The belt does not cross any numbered routes. It travels in a loop on four two-way streets—Stanwix Street, Fort Duquesne Boulevard/11th Street, Grant Street and Boulevard of the Allies. (In the counter-clockwise direction, it follows Smithfield Street and 4th Avenue to bypass the left turn from Boulevard of the Allies onto Grant Street, which is prohibited at certain times.) This lies inside the area bounded by the Allegheny River, Interstate 579, Interstate 376 and Interstate 279.
