= McKeesport–Duquesne Bridge =

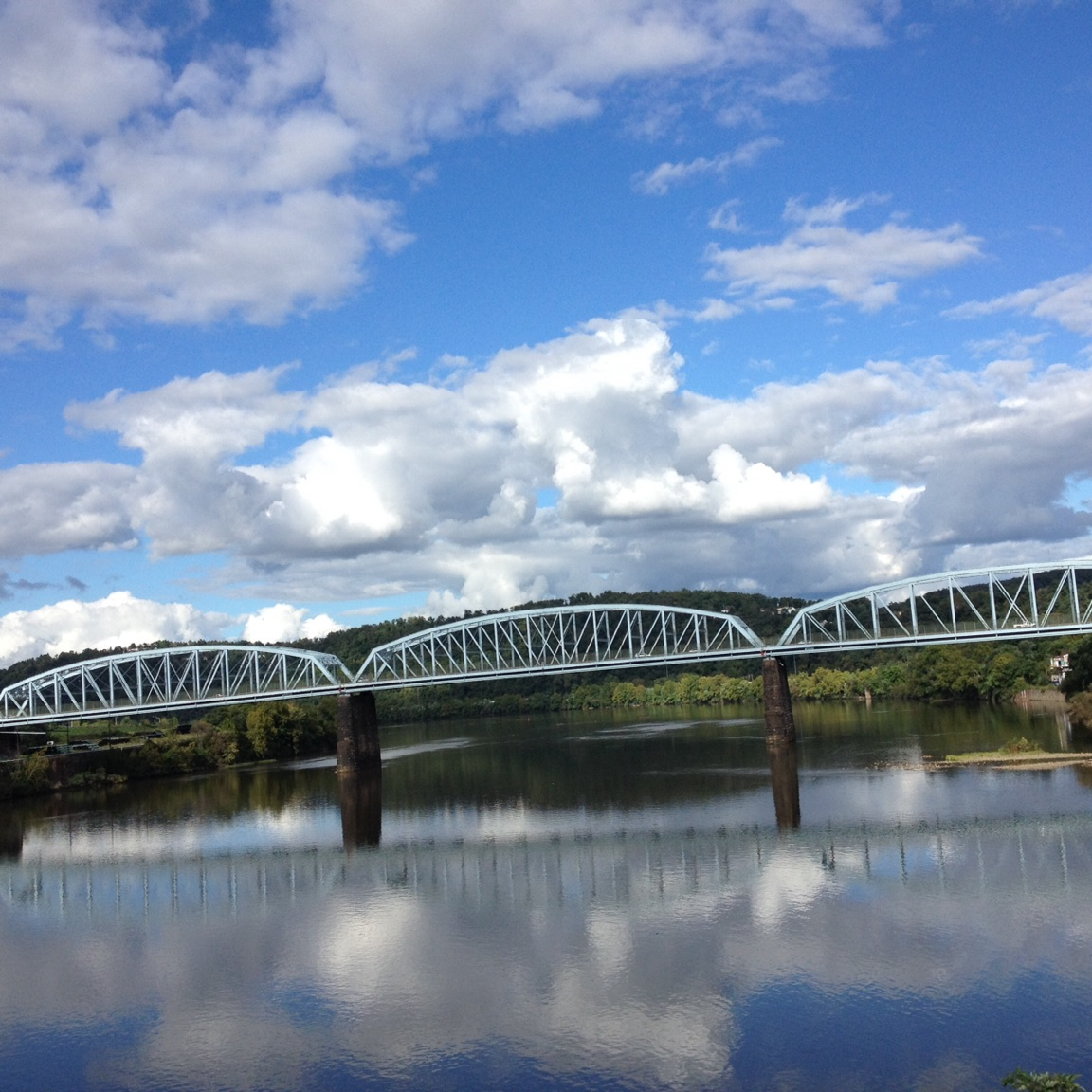
- Coordinates: 40.3579°N 79.8440°W
- Carries: 2 lanes of South Duquesne Avenue
- Crosses: Monongahela River
- Locale: McKeesport, Pennsylvania and Duquesne, Pennsylvania

Characteristics
- Design: Truss bridge
- Total length: 2,252.1 feet (686.4 m)
- Width: 38 feet (12 m)
- Height: 18 feet (5.5 m)
- Longest span: 382.5 feet (116.6 m)
- Piers in water: 2
- Clearance below: 49.1 feet (15.0 m)

History
- Engineering design by: Vang Construction company
- Constructed by: American Bridge Company
- Opened: September 5, 1928

Location
- Interactive map of McKeesport–Duquesne Bridge

The McKeesport–Duquesne Bridge it is a truss bridge that carries vehicular traffic across the Monongahela River between McKeesport, Pennsylvania and Duquesne, Pennsylvania. The bridge connects Route 837 in Duquesne and Route 148 in McKeesport.

== History ==
The bridge was planned in 1924 at the order of the Public Service Commission. The costs were apportioned amongst the railroads that were crossed, the local cities and the county.

- Pennsylvania Railroad $85,000
- Baltimore and Ohio Railroad $262,000
- Pittsburgh and Lake Erie Railroad $110,200
- City of McKeesport $105,800
- City of Duquesne $24,000
- balance paid by Allegheny County.

The bridge was opened on September 5, 1928 on the same day as the neighboring Clairton–Glassport Bridge.

The bridge is built near the mouth of Crooked Run; it was near this point in 1755 that General Edward Braddock's forces crossed the Monongahela the first time on their way to what would be known as the Battle of Braddock's Field.

== See also ==
- List of crossings of the Monongahela River
