= Wall, Pennsylvania =

Borough in Pennsylvania, US

- Borough
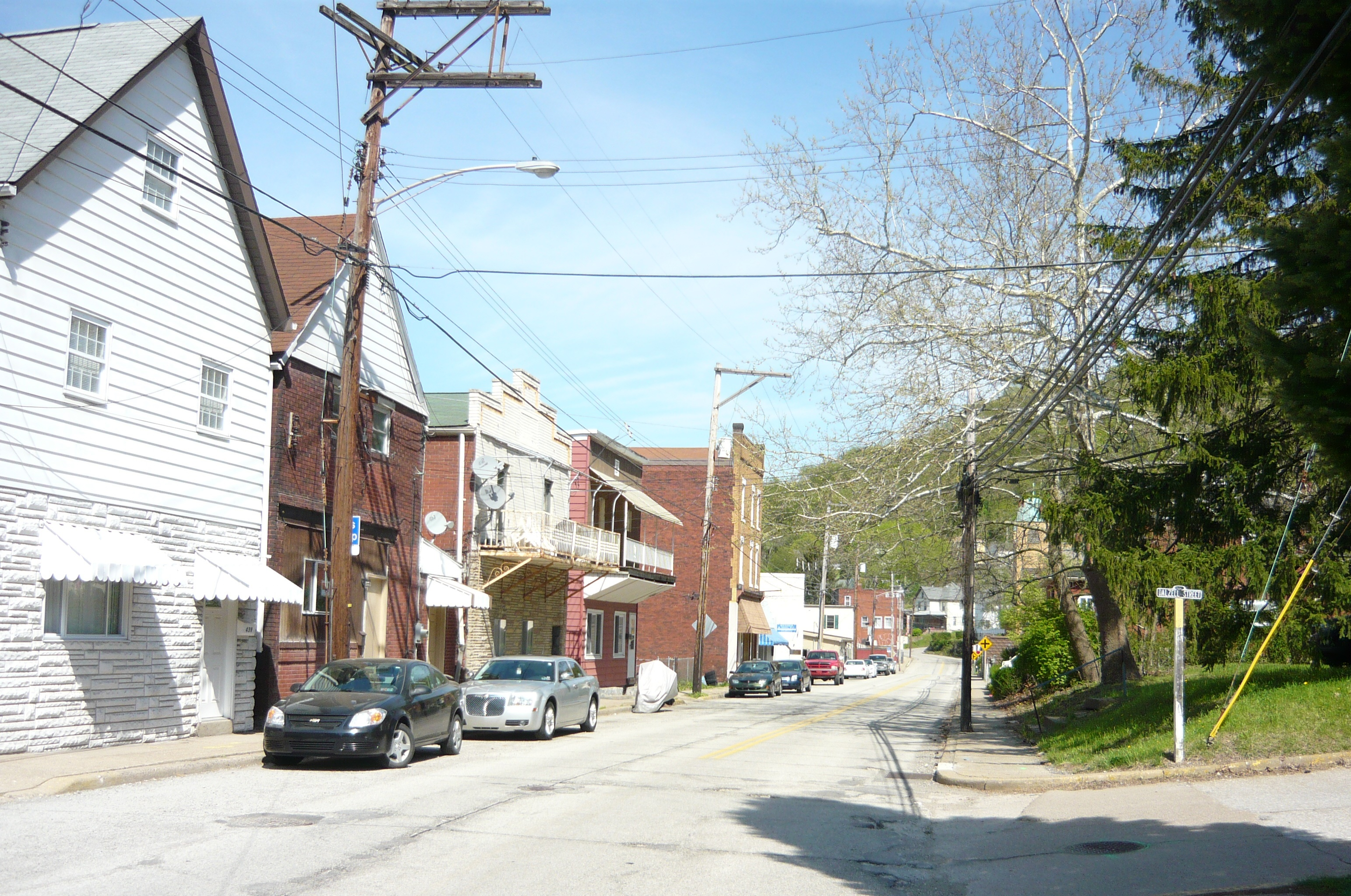
- Main Street

- Location in Allegheny County and the U.S. state of Pennsylvania.
- Coordinates: 40°23′36″N 79°47′16″W
- Country: United States
- State: Pennsylvania
- County: Allegheny

Area
  - Total: 0.44 sq mi (1.13 km^{2})
  - Land: 0.44 sq mi (1.13 km^{2})
  - Water: 0 sq mi (0.00 km^{2})

Population (2020)
  - Total: 519
  - Estimate (2019): 557
  - Density: 1,273/sq mi (491.4/km^{2})
- Time zone: UTC-5 (Eastern (EST))
  - Summer (DST): UTC-4 (EDT)
- FIPS code: 42-80600
- Website: www.wallborough.com

Wall is a borough in Allegheny County, Pennsylvania, United States. The population was 519 at the 2020 census.

== History ==
Wall is located at the site of a farm purchased by James Walls in 1829. The property, on the south bank of Turtle Creek, was passed to James' sons Henry and John Walls, who lived in a log cabin near the heart of present-day Wall. A station on the Pennsylvania Railroad opened in the early 1840s, which was named "Walls' Station" in honor of the Walls family. Eventually, the name of the station and the town that grew up around it was shortened to "Wall Station". Henry and John Walls sold their property to their cousin Frank Wall, an engineer on riverboats who developed the property around the station. Wall got its name after this Frank Wall, whose said property development led to him being the owner of the first two houses erected in the region.

The town around Wall Station was incorporated in 1904 as Wall Borough. The borough grew rapidly during the first half of the twentieth century because a freight depot of the Pennsylvania Railroad was located at Wall. The population and economic vitality of the borough declined during the second half of the twentieth century as the railroad industry was eclipsed by the airline and trucking industries.

Channel 40, WPCB-TV, broadcasts from Wall.

Wall, along with East Mckeesport, is served by United Volunteer Fire/Rescue, formerly Wall VFD and East Mckeesport VFC #2.

== Geography ==
Wall is located at 40°23′36″N 79°47′16″W (40.393468, −79.787692).

According to the United States Census Bureau, the borough has a total area of 0.4 square miles (1.0 km^{2}), all land.

== Surrounding neighborhoods ==
Wall is almost entirely surrounded by North Versailles Township. The only other border is with Wilmerding to the west.

== Education ==
Wall is served by the East Allegheny School District.

== Demographics ==
Historical population
Census	Pop.	Note	%±
1910	1,962		—
1920	2,426		23.6%
1930	2,236		−7.8%
1940	2,098		−6.2%
1950	1,850		−11.8%
1960	1,493		−19.3%
1970	1,265		−15.3%
1980	989		−21.8%
1990	853		−13.8%
2000	727		−14.8%
2010	580		−20.2%
2020	519		−10.5%

As of the 2000 census, there were 727 people, 324 households, and 197 families residing in the borough. The population density was 1,641.0 inhabitants per square mile (633.6/km^{2}). There were 363 housing units at an average density of 819.4 per square mile (316.4/km^{2}). The racial makeup of the borough was 97.25% White, 2.06% African American, 0.14% Asian, and 0.55% from two or more races. Hispanic or Latino of any race were 0.28% of the population.

There were 324 households, out of which 22.5% had children under the age of 18 living with them, 40.7% were married couples living together, 13.6% had a female householder with no husband present, and 38.9% were non-families. 35.2% of all households were made up of individuals, and 15.1% had someone living alone who was 65 years of age or older. The average household size was 2.24 and the average family size was 2.84.

In the borough the population was spread out, with 19.7% under the age of 18, 7.8% from 18 to 24, 31.8% from 25 to 44, 21.2% from 45 to 64, and 19.5% who were 65 years of age or older. The median age was 40 years. For every 100 females there were 90.3 males. For every 100 females age 18 and over, there were 89.6 males.

The median income for a household in the borough was $26,595, and the median income for a family was $32,500. Males had a median income of $25,500 versus $23,333 for females. The per capita income for the borough was $14,720. About 10.7% of families and 16.7% of the population were below the poverty line, including 40.0% of those under age 18 and 6.3% of those age 65 or over.

== Government and politics ==
Presidential election results
Year	Republican	Democratic	Third parties
2020	50% 107	47% 100	1% 3
2016	55% 94	43% 74	2% 3
2012	36% 66	60% 111	4% 7
