= Elizabeth Township, Allegheny County, Pennsylvania =

Township in Pennsylvania, US

Elizabeth Township
- Township
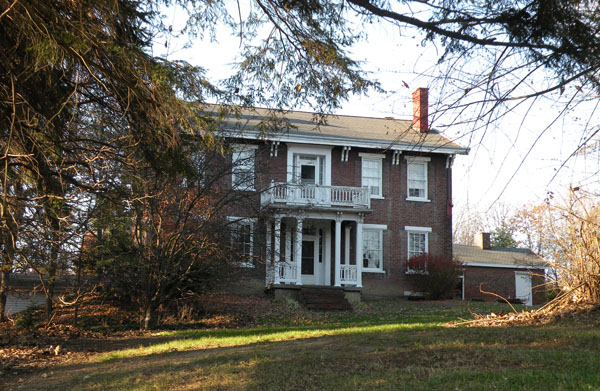
- Hutchinson Farm; National Register of Historic Places

- Emblem

- Location in Allegheny County and state of Pennsylvania
- Coordinates: 40°16′50″N 79°49′40″W
- Country: United States
- State: Pennsylvania
- County: Allegheny

Area
  - Total: 23.27 sq mi (60.27 km^{2})
  - Land: 22.84 sq mi (59.15 km^{2})
  - Water: 0.43 sq mi (1.12 km^{2})

Population (2020)
  - Total: 12,972 ▼
  - Estimate (2021): 12,792
  - Density: 573.9/sq mi (221.59/km^{2})
- Time zone: UTC-5 (Eastern (EST))
  - Summer (DST): UTC-4 (EDT)
- ZIP code: 15037 15135
- FIPS code: 42-003-23000
- Website: elizabethtownshippa.com

Elizabeth Township is a township in Allegheny County, Pennsylvania, United States. The population was 12,972 at the 2020 census. Elizabeth Township – along with Pitt, Plum, Versailles, St. Clair, Moon, and Mifflin – was one of the original seven townships of Allegheny County. Elizabeth Township has two ZIP Codes. 15037 serves majority of the township and is addressed as Elizabeth. 15135 is used for the northeastern parts of the township and is addressed as Elizabeth Township.

== Geography ==
According to the United States Census Bureau, the township has a total area of 23.0 square miles (60 km^{2}), of which 22.5 square miles (58 km^{2}) is land and 0.4 square miles (1.0 km^{2}), or 1.96%, is water. It contains the census-designated places of Boston and Greenock.

== Surrounding and adjacent neighborhoods ==
Elizabeth Township has four land borders, including Lincoln to the north, Rostraver Township in Westmoreland County to the south, Forward Township to the west and southwest, and the borough of Elizabeth to the northwest. Across the Monongahela River to the northwest, a short segment of Elizabeth Township runs adjacent with Jefferson Hills. Across the Youghiogheny River to the west, seven neighborhoods run adjacent with Elizabeth Township, including (from north to south) Versailles (with direct connection via Boston Bridge), McKeesport (Small border across river), White Oak (although a very small section is situated across the river), South Versailles Township, North Huntingdon Township (again with a small section bordering the other side of the river), Sewickley Township, and Sutersville, the latter three neighborhoods in Westmoreland County.

== Government and politics ==
Presidential elections results
| Year | Republican | Democratic | Third parties |
|---|---|---|---|
| 2020 | 63% 4,984 | 35% 2,834 | 0.9% 71 |
| 2016 | 64% 4,449 | 35% 2,405 | 1% 93 |
| 2012 | 58% 3,958 | 41% 2,764 | 1% 54 |

== Demographics ==
Historical population
| Census | Pop. | Note | %± |
|---|---|---|---|
| 1970 | 15,525 | | — |
| 1980 | 16,269 | | 4.8% |
| 1990 | 14,712 | | −9.6% |
| 2000 | 13,839 | | −5.9% |
| 2010 | 13,271 | | −4.1% |
| 2020 | 12,972 | | −2.3% |
| 2024 (est.) | 12,515 | | −3.5% |
U.S. Decennial Census

As of the 2000 census, there were 13,839 people, 5,467 households, and 4,105 families residing in the township. The population density was 610/sq mi (240/km^{2}). There were 5,678 housing units at an average density of 250/sq mi (100/km^{2}). The racial makeup of the township was 97.36% White, 1.69% African American, 0.04% Native American, 0.26% Asian, 0.01% Pacific Islander, 0.17% from other races, and 0.46% from two or more races. Hispanic or Latino of any race were 0.37% of the population.

There were 5,467 households, out of which 28.3% had children under the age of 18 living with them, 62.5% were married couples living together, 9.1% had a female householder with no husband present, and 24.9% were non-families. 22.2% of all households were made up of individuals, and 11.5% had someone living alone who was 65 years of age or older. The average household size was 2.50 and the average family size was 2.92.

In the township the population was spread out, with 21.4% under the age of 18, 6.3% from 18 to 24, 25.1% from 25 to 44, 27.7% from 45 to 64, and 19.5% who were 65 years of age or older. The median age was 43 years. For every 100 females, there were 92.3 males. For every 100 females age 18 and over, there were 89.5 males.

The median income for a household in the township was $42,463, and the median income for a family was $50,740. Males had a median income of $41,145 versus $25,988 for females. The per capita income for the township was $20,904. About 3.7% of families and 6.6% of the population were below the poverty line, including 8.2% of those under age 18 and 10.1% of those age 65 or over.
