= East McKeesport, Pennsylvania =

Borough in Pennsylvania, US

- Borough
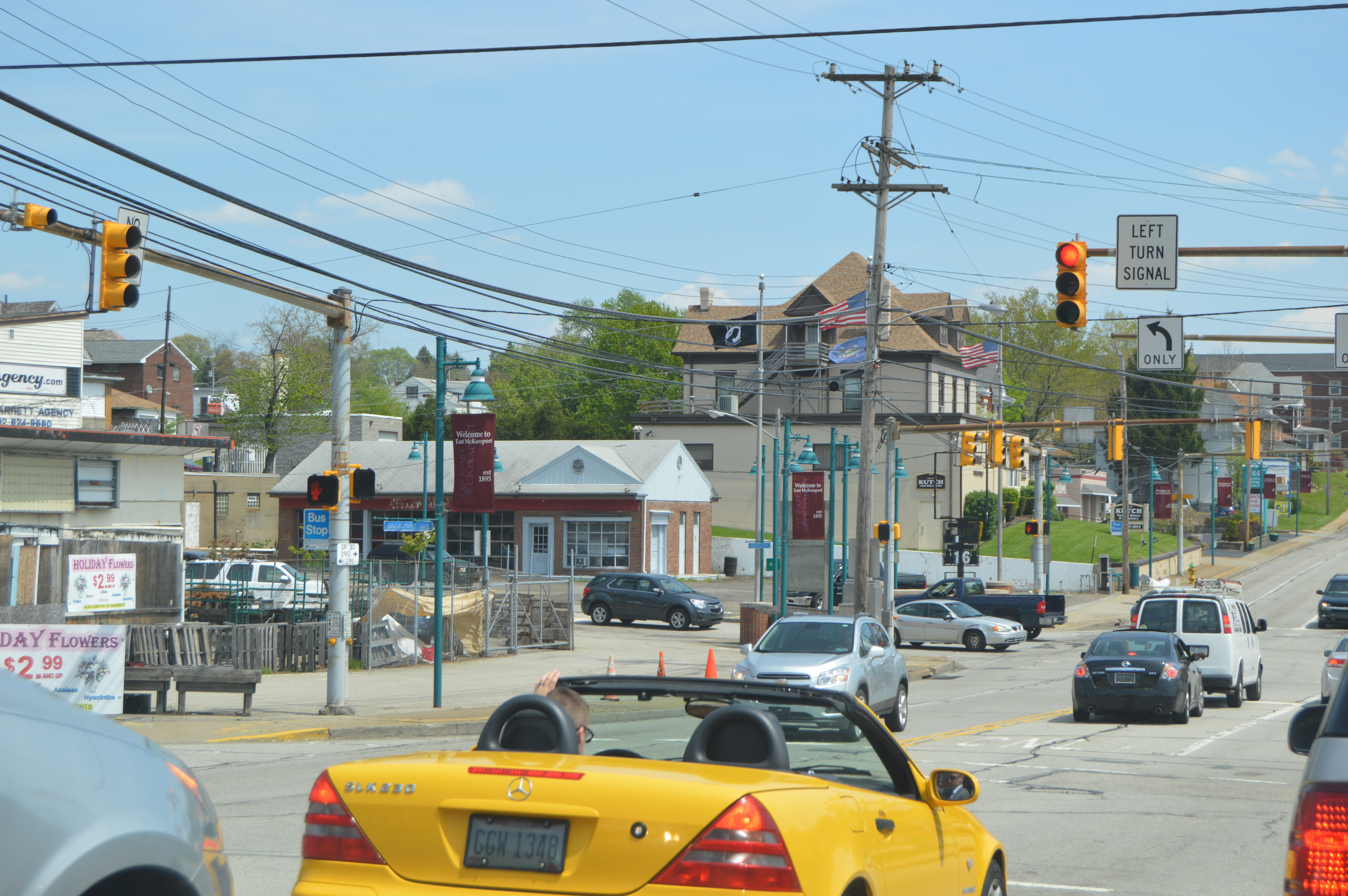
- Scene along U.S. Route 30

- Location in Allegheny County and the U.S. state of Pennsylvania.

- Location of Pennsylvania in the United States
- Coordinates: 40°23′3″N 79°48′29″W
- Country: United States
- State: Pennsylvania
- County: Allegheny County

Area
  - Total: 0.41 sq mi (1.07 km^{2})
  - Land: 0.41 sq mi (1.07 km^{2})
  - Water: 0 sq mi (0.00 km^{2})

Population (2020)
  - Total: 2,076
  - Density: 5,026/sq mi (1,940.5/km^{2})
- Time zone: UTC-5 (EST)
  - Summer (DST): UTC-4 (EDT)
- FIPS code: 42-21444
- Website: eastmckeesportboro.com

East McKeesport is a borough in Allegheny County, Pennsylvania, United States, and is part of the Pittsburgh metropolitan area. The population was 2,076 at the 2020 census.

== Geography ==
East McKeesport is located at 40°23′3″N 79°48′29″W (40.384223, -79.807924).

According to the United States Census Bureau, the borough has a total area of 0.4 square miles (1.0 km^{2}), all land.

== Government and politics ==
Presidential elections results
Year	Republican	Democratic	Third parties
2020	43% 470	54% 589	1% 17
2016	46% 462	51% 519	3% 27
2012	42% 403	56% 533	1% 13

== Surrounding neighborhoods ==
East McKeesport is mostly surrounded by North Versailles Township; the only other border is with Wilmerding to the northwest.

== Demographics ==
Historical population
Census	Pop.	Note	%±
1900	873		—
1910	2,118		142.6%
1920	2,430		14.7%
1930	2,922		20.2%
1940	3,026		3.6%
1950	3,171		4.8%
1960	3,470		9.4%
1970	3,233		−6.8%
1980	2,940		−9.1%
1990	2,678		−8.9%
2000	2,343		−12.5%
2010	2,126		−9.3%
2020	2,076		−2.4%

As of the 2000 census, there were 2,343 people, 1,078 households, and 636 families living in the borough. The population density was 5,947.9 inhabitants per square mile (2,296.5/km^{2}). There were 1,154 housing units at an average density of 2,929.5 per square mile (1,131.1/km^{2}). The racial makeup of the borough was 95.65% White, 2.86% African American, 0.13% Native American, 0.13% Asian, 0.17% from other races, and 1.07% from two or more races. Hispanic or Latino of any race were 0.68% of the population.

There were 1,078 households, out of which 22.7% had children under the age of 18 living with them, 42.4% were married couples living together, 12.4% had a female householder with no husband present, and 41.0% were non-families. 37.3% of all households were made up of individuals, and 17.3% had someone living alone who was 65 years of age or older. The average household size was 2.17 and the average family size was 2.87.

In the borough the population was spread out, with 19.6% under the age of 18, 7.2% from 18 to 24, 29.2% from 25 to 44, 22.2% from 45 to 64, and 21.7% who were 65 years of age or older. The median age was 42 years. For every 100 females there were 91.7 males. For every 100 females age 18 and over, there were 87.2 males.

The median income for a household in the borough was $28,431, and the median income for a family was $38,000. Males had a median income of $31,700 versus $23,182 for females. The per capita income for the borough was $16,695. About 4.8% of families and 8.3% of the population were below the poverty line, including 7.8% of those under age 18 and 7.9% of those age 65 or over.

== Police/Fire Department ==
East McKeesport is served by the East McKeesport Police Department, which also serves the Borough of Wall.

United Volunteer Fire/Rescue, formerly Wall VFD and East McKeesport VFD #2, provides fire services for East McKeesport and Wall.
