= Versailles, Pennsylvania =

Borough in Pennsylvania, US

- Borough
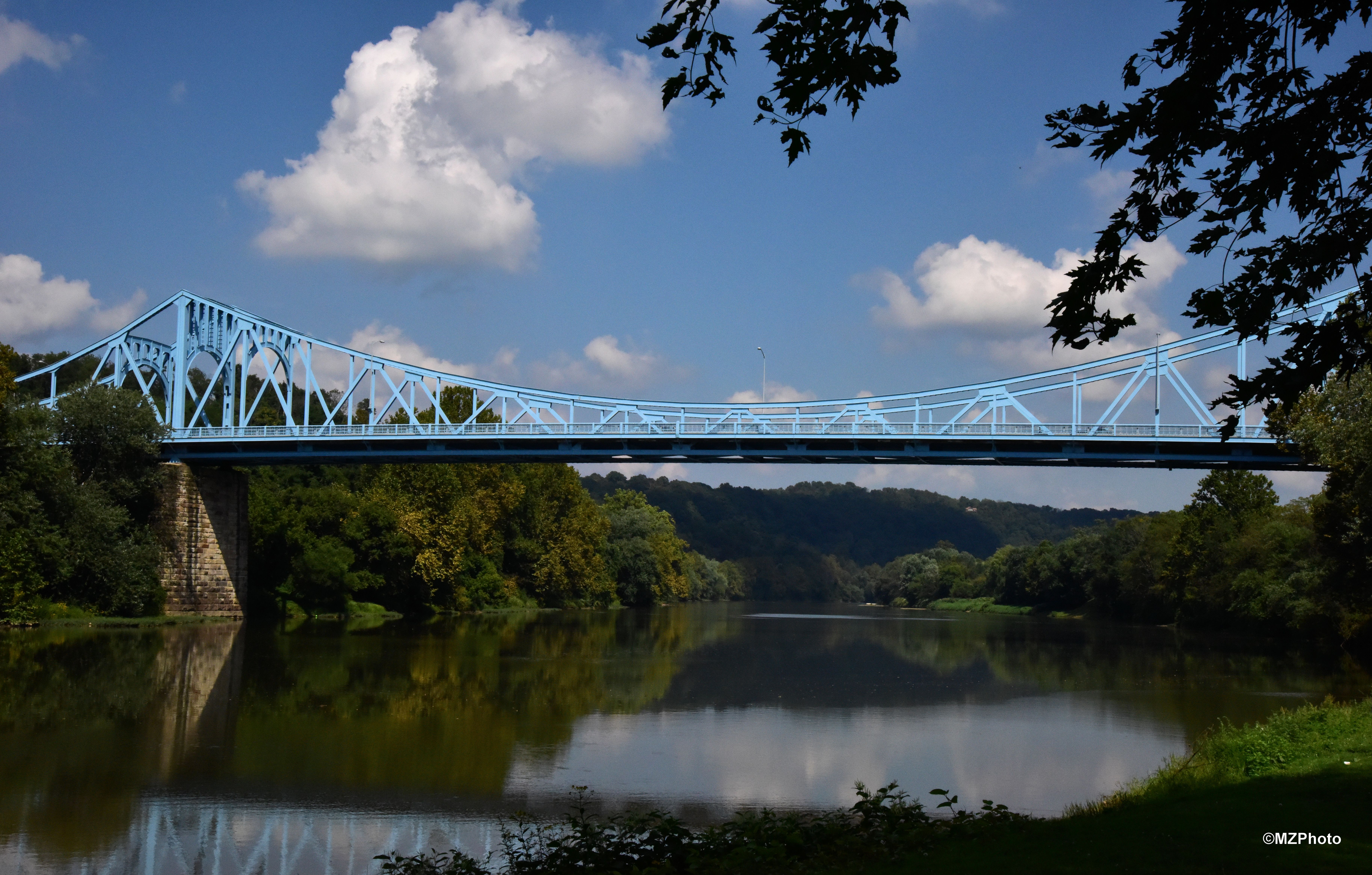
- Boston Bridge

- Location in Allegheny County and the U.S. state of Pennsylvania.
- Coordinates: 40°19′1″N 79°50′0″W
- Country: United States
- State: Pennsylvania
- County: Allegheny
- Incorporated: June 16, 1894

Area
  - Total: 0.541 sq mi (1.40 km^{2})
  - Land: 0.484 sq mi (1.25 km^{2})
  - Water: 0.057 sq mi (0.15 km^{2})

Population (2020)
  - Total: 1,476
  - Estimate (2019): 1,461
  - Density: 3,006.17/sq mi (1,160.69/km^{2})
- Time zone: UTC-5 (Eastern (EST))
  - Summer (DST): UTC-4 (EDT)
- FIPS code: 42-80040
- Website: versaillesboro.com

Versailles (/vɜːrˈseɪlz/ vur-SAYLZ) is a borough in Allegheny County, Pennsylvania, United States. At the 2020 census, the population was 1,476.

== History ==
The borough of Versailles was incorporated on June 16, 1894. It comprised the pre-existing villages of Bissell and Elrod. An earlier incorporation in 1892 had been voided because of a defective petition.

== Geography ==
Versailles is located at 40°19′1″N 79°50′0″W (40.316869, -79.833414). According to the United States Census Bureau, the borough has a total area of 0.541 square miles (1.40 km^{2}), of which 0.057 square miles (0.15 km^{2}), or 10.5%, is water: the Youghiogheny River.

=== Surrounding and adjacent neighborhoods ===
Versailles' land border is with McKeesport from the northeast to northwest. White Oak Borough to the east. Across the Youghiogheny River, Versailles runs adjacent with Elizabeth Township to the south (with direct connector via Boston Bridge) and Lincoln to the southwest.

== Demographics ==
Historical population
Census	Pop.	Note	%±
1900	870		—
1910	1,437		65.2%
1920	1,936		34.7%
1930	2,473		27.7%
1940	2,401		−2.9%
1950	2,484		3.5%
1960	2,297		−7.5%
1970	2,754		19.9%
1980	2,150		−21.9%
1990	1,821		−15.3%
2000	1,724		−5.3%
2010	1,515		−12.1%
2020	1,476		−2.6%

As of the 2000 census there were 1,724 people, 852 households, and 442 families residing in the borough. The population density was 3,511.1 inhabitants per square mile (1,355.6/km^{2}). There were 937 housing units at an average density of 1,908.3 per square mile (736.8/km^{2}). The racial makeup of the borough was 95.88% White, 2.55% African American, 0.17% Native American, 0.35% Asian, 0.06% from other races, and 0.99% from two or more races. Hispanic or Latino of any race were 0.75% of the population.

There were 852 households, out of which 18.8% had children under the age of 18 living with them, 38.7% were married couples living together, 9.9% had a female householder with no husband present, and 48.1% were non-families. 42.0% of all households were made up of individuals, and 24.3% had someone living alone who was 65 years of age or older. The average household size was 2.02 and the average family size was 2.80.

In the borough the population was spread out, with 17.1% under the age of 18, 5.3% from 18 to 24, 27.7% from 25 to 44, 23.1% from 45 to 64, and 26.9% who were 65 years of age or older. The median age was 45 years. For every 100 females there were 80.3 males. For every 100 females age 18 and over, there were 81.0 males.

The median income for a household in the borough was $24,552, and the median income for a family was $36,184. Males had a median income of $29,242 versus $24,464 for females. The per capita income for the borough was $15,889. About 10.2% of families and 16.6% of the population were below the poverty line, including 31.9% of those under age 18 and 13.2% of those age 65 or over.

== Government and politics ==
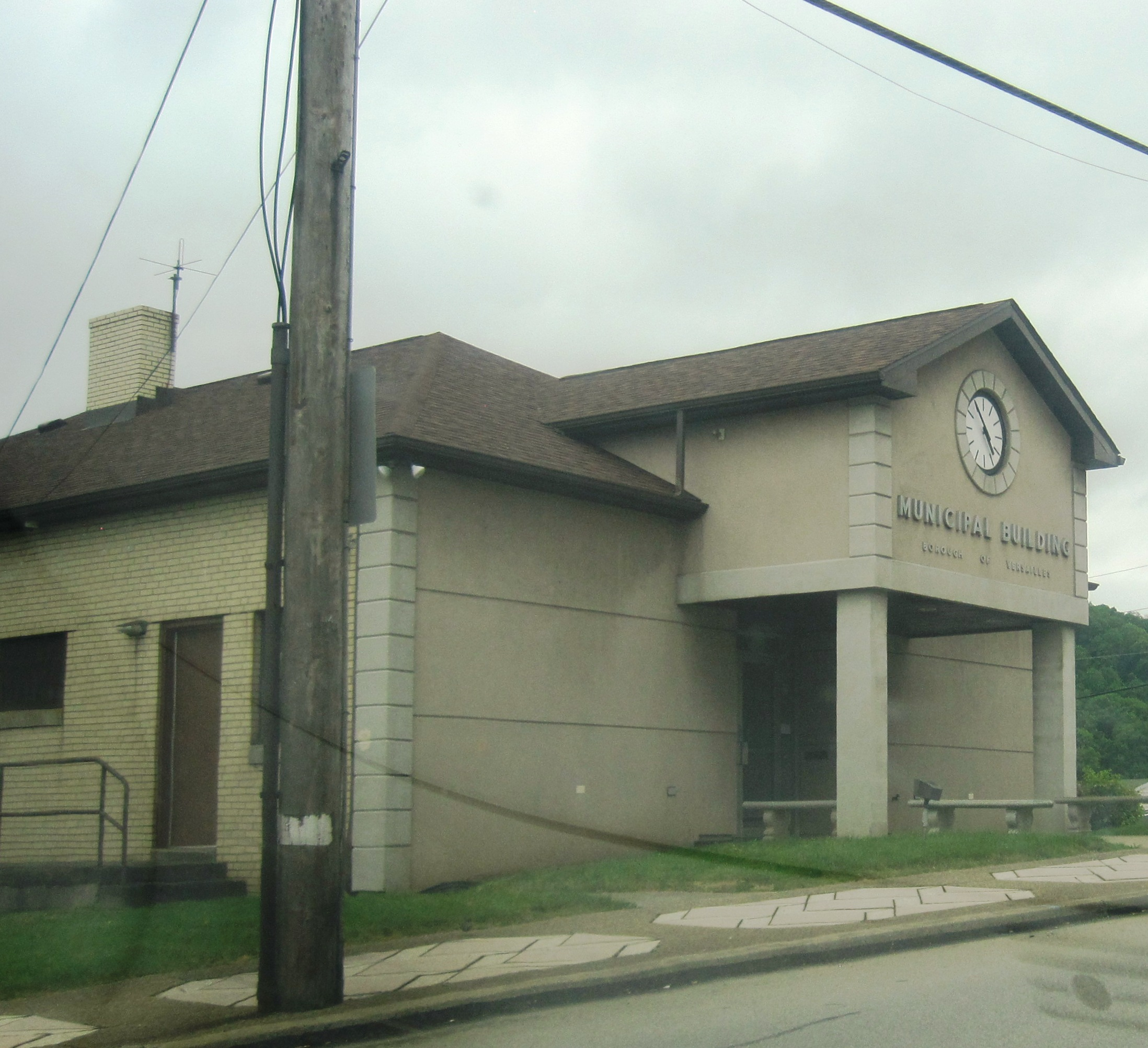
Versailles Municipal Building

Versailles is governed by a seven-member borough council, with one of its members serving as president. In January 2009, the president was Patricia Brown, and the other members of council were Amy Barnes, Gene Ferry, Jim Sheedy, Linda Sheedy, Bob Stanesic, and Walt Winkler.

Presidential election results
Year	Republican	Democratic	Third parties
2020	47% 332	51% 363	1% 11
2016	49% 303	50% 311	1% 8
2012	46% 266	53% 304	1% 5

== Public services ==
Versailles has historically maintained a small police force, which in January 2009 had a strength of three full-time officers and was supplemented with a number of part-time officers. This force was abolished by a close vote of the borough council on January 20, 2009. In its place, the council agreed to a contract with the larger borough of White Oak to the east to have White Oak police serve in Versailles. Versailles reactivated its own police department in 2010. The Versailles Volunteer Fire Company provides fire services to the borough.
