= 2025 Pennsylvania elections =

- November 4, 2025
- Turnout: 42.5%

Percentage color key
60–70%
50–60%
40–50%
30–40%
20–30%
10–20%
0–10%

The 2025 Pennsylvania elections took place on November 4, 2025, to hold judicial retention votes and fill numerous county, local, and municipal offices. The necessary primary elections were held on May 20, 2025. In addition, two special elections for legislative vacancies were held during the year.

Elections for open seats on the Pennsylvania Superior Court and Pennsylvania Commonwealth Court were won by Democratic Party candidates Brandon Neuman and Stella Tsai, respectively. Retention elections for three Democratic justices on the Pennsylvania Supreme Court also saw success despite a Republican Party effort against their retention. The statewide wins for Democrats, in addition to success in local races, led to the 2025 elections being dubbed a "blue wave."

== Special elections ==
=== 36th Senate district ===
State Senator Ryan Aument resigned effective December 31, 2024, to become state director for U.S. Senator-elect Dave McCormick. Lieutenant Governor Austin Davis set the special election to replace Aument for March 25. East Petersburg Mayor James Andrew Malone received the Democratic Party nomination. The Libertarian Party nominated GIS analyst Zachary Moore. The Republican Party nominated Lancaster County Commissioner Josh Parsons. In an upset, Malone narrowly won the race where Parsons, the Republican, was considered the favorite to win because the district had favored Republican candidates.

2025 Pennsylvania Senate special election, District 36
Party	Candidate	Votes	%
Democratic	James Andrew Malone	27,034	50.0
Republican	Josh Parsons	26,508	49.1
Libertarian	Zachary Moore	483	0.9
Total votes		54,025	100.0
Democratic gain from Republican			

=== 35th House of Representatives district ===
2025 Pennsylvania House of Representatives District 35 special election
- March 25, 2025

Pennsylvania House of Representatives District 35
- Turnout: 25.0% (unofficial)
Candidate	Dan Goughnour	Chuck Davis
Party	Democratic	Republican
Popular vote	6,825	3,761
Percentage	63.40%	34.94%
- Precinct results Goughnour: 40–50% 50–60% 60–70% 70–80% 80–90% 90–100% Davis: 40–50% 50–60% 70–80% No votes
Representative before election
Matthew Gergely
Democratic
Elected Representative
Dan Goughnour
Democratic

State Representative Matt Gergely died on January 19, 2025. A special election to fill his seat took place on March 25. The Allegheny County Republican Party nominated White Oak council member Charles Davis. The Democratic Party nominated police officer Daniel E. Goughnour. The Libertarian Party nominated Adam Kitta. Goughnour's victory in the special election broke the even 101–101 partisan split in the State House caused by Gergely's death.

2025 Pennsylvania House of Representatives special election, District 35
Party	Candidate	Votes	%
Democratic	Daniel Goughnour	6,825	63.5
Republican	Charles Davis	3,761	35.0
Libertarian	Adam Kitta	167	1.6
Total votes		10,753	100.0
Democratic hold			

== Judge of the Superior Court ==
2025 Pennsylvania Superior Court election
- November 4, 2025
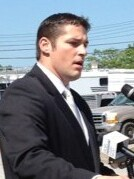

Nominee	Brandon Neuman	Maria Battista
Party	Democratic	Republican
Popular vote	2,056,528	1,548,563
Percentage	55.93%	42.12%
- Neuman: 50–60% 60–70% 80–90% Battista: 40–50% 50–60% 60–70% 70–80%
Judge before election
Vacant
Elected Judge
Brandon Neuman
Democratic

There was one vacancy on the Superior Court, due to Justice Dan McCaffery's election to the Pennsylvania Supreme Court in 2023. Washington County Court of Common Pleas judge Brandon Neuman won the open seat.

=== Democratic primary ===
==== Nominee ====
- Brandon Neuman, Judge of the Washington County Court of Common Pleas

==== Endorsements ====
Brandon Neuman

Political parties

- Pennsylvania Democratic Party

==== Results ====
Democratic primary results
Party	Candidate	Votes	%
Democratic	Brandon Neuman	843,400	100.0%
Total votes		843,400	100.0%

=== Republican primary ===
==== Nominee ====
- Maria Battista, president of Judge Government Services, a consulting firm; nominee for Superior Court in 2023

==== Eliminated in primary ====
- Ann Marie Wheatcraft, president judge of the Chester County Court of Common Pleas

==== Endorsements ====
Ann Marie Wheatcraft

Political parties

- Pennsylvania Republican Party

==== Results ====
Republican primary results
Party	Candidate	Votes	%
Republican	Maria Battista	355,760	54.04%
Republican	Ann Marie Wheatcraft	302,592	45.96%
Total votes		658,352	100.0%

Primary results by county: Battista—50—60% Battista—60—70% Battista—70–80% Battista—80–90% Wheatcraft—50–60% Wheatcraft—60–70% Wheatcraft—70–80% Wheatcraft—80–90%

=== Third-party and independent candidates ===
- Dan Wassmer, Keystone nominee for U.S. Senate in 2022 and Libertarian nominee for attorney general in 2020 (Liberal)

=== General election ===
==== Endorsements ====
Brandon Neuman

Labor unions

- AFSCME Council 13
- International Brotherhood of Electrical Workers
- Pennsylvania AFL-CIO
- Pennsylvania Laborers’ District Council
- Pennsylvania State Education Association
- Pennsylvania Fraternal Order of Police
- Pennsylvania Sheriffs' Association
- Pennsylvania State Troopers Association
Maria Battista

Organizations

- Gun Owners of America

==== Fundraising ====
Campaign finance reports as of November 24, 2025
Candidate	Raised	Spent	Cash on hand
Brandon Neuman (D)	$861,413	$786,962	$74,451
Maria Battista (R)	$244,857	$197,762	$48,343
Source: PA Department of State

==== Results ====
2025 Pennsylvania Superior Court election
Party	Candidate	Votes	%
Democratic	Brandon Neuman	2,056,528	55.93%
Republican	Maria Battista	1,548,563	42.12%
Liberal	Dan Wassmer	71,648	1.95%
Total votes		3,676,739	100.0%
Democratic hold			

== Judge of the Commonwealth Court ==
2025 Pennsylvania Commonwealth Court election
- November 4, 2025

Nominee	Stella Tsai	Matt Wolford
Party	Democratic	Republican
Popular vote	2,076,070	1,584,223
Percentage	56.72%	43.28%
- Tsai: 50–60% 60–70% 80–90% Wolford: 50–60% 60–70% 70–80% 80–90%
Judge before election
Vacant
Elected Judge
Stella Tsai
Democratic

One seat was up for election after Judge Ellen Ceisler retired in January 2025. Philadelphia County Court of Common Pleas judge Stella Tsai won this seat.

=== Democratic primary ===
==== Nominee ====
- Stella Tsai, Judge of the Philadelphia County Court of Common Pleas

==== Endorsements ====
Stella Tsai

Political parties

- Pennsylvania Democratic Party

==== Results ====
Democratic primary results
Party	Candidate	Votes	%
Democratic	Stella Tsai	842,239	100.0%
Total votes		842,239	100.0%

=== Republican primary ===
==== Nominee ====
- Matthew Wolford, environmental attorney

==== Eliminated in primary ====
- Joshua Prince, gun rights attorney, candidate in 2023

==== Endorsements ====
Joshua Prince

Organizations

- Gun Owners of America
Matthew Wolford

Political parties

- Pennsylvania Republican Party

==== Results ====
Republican primary results
Party	Candidate	Votes	%
Republican	Matthew Wolford	405,704	61.98%
Republican	Joshua Prince	248,863	38.02%
Total votes		654,567	100.0%

=== General election ===
==== Endorsements ====
Stella Tsai

Organizations

- Conservation Voters of Pennsylvania
- PSEA-PACE
- Planned Parenthood Pennsylvania Advocates
Matthew Wolford

Labor unions

- Pennsylvania Fraternal Order of Police
- Pennsylvania State Troopers Association

Organizations

- Gun Owners of America

==== Fundraising ====
Campaign finance reports as of November 24, 2025
Candidate	Raised	Spent	Cash on hand
Stella Tsai (D)	$432,402	$426,293	$16,186
Matthew Wolford (R)	$570,919	$560,468	$10,451
Source: PA Department of State

==== Results ====
2025 Pennsylvania Commonwealth Court election
Party	Candidate	Votes	%
Democratic	Stella Tsai	2,076,070	56.72%
Republican	Matthew Wolford	1,584,223	43.28%
Total votes		3,660,293	100.0%
Democratic hold			

== Judicial retention ==
=== Pennsylvania Supreme Court ===
Pennsylvania Supreme Court Justices Christine Donohue, Kevin Dougherty, and David Wecht were due for retention votes. These elections were more heavily contested than previous judicial retention elections. All three justices up for retention were originally elected as Democrats, and Republicans targeted them in an attempt to regain control of the court.

Justice Christine Donohue (D) retention, 2025
Choice	Votes	%
For	2,231,527	61.80
Against	1,379,599	38.20
Total	3,611,126	100.00

Justice Kevin Dougherty (D) retention, 2025
Choice	Votes	%
For	2,227,880	61.79
Against	1,377,687	38.21
Total	3,605,567	100.00

Justice David Wecht (D) retention, 2025
Choice	Votes	%
For	2,209,781	61.46
Against	1,385,673	38.54
Total	3,595,454	100.00

=== Superior Court ===
Results by county: Yes: 50–60%; 60–70%; 70–80%; 80–90%; No: 50–60%; 60–70%

Judge Alice Beck Dubow (D) retention, 2025
Choice	Votes	%
For	2,141,692	62.02
Against	1,311,478	37.98
Total	3,453,170	100.00

=== Commonwealth Court ===
Results by county: Yes: 50–60%; 60–70%; 70–80%; 80–90%; No: 50–60%; 60–70%

Judge Michael Wojcik (D) retention, 2025
Choice	Votes	%
For	2,150,048	62.40
Against	1,295,384	37.60
Total	3,445,432	100.00
