= Dan Goughnour =

American politician

Daniel Goughnour

Member of the Pennsylvania House of Representatives from the 35th district
- Incumbent
- Assumed office April 7, 2025
- Preceded by: Matthew Gergely

Personal details
- Political party: Democratic

Daniel Goughnour is an American politician who is the member of the Pennsylvania House of Representatives from the 35th district. A Democrat, he was first elected in a March 2025 special election caused by the death of Democratic representative Matthew Gergely on January 19, 2025.

== Early life and career ==
Goughnour is a lifelong resident of McKeesport, Pennsylvania, and graduated from the Allegheny County Police Academy. He has served in the McKeesport Police Department for 16 years, where he held roles including detective for juvenile crimes and later chief of detectives. In addition to his law enforcement career, Goughnour has been involved in the community as a youth sports coach and serves on the McKeesport Area School District school board.

== Pennsylvania House of Representatives ==
Goughnour was nominated by the Allegheny County Democratic Committee as their candidate for the 35th District following the death of Representative Matt Gergely. In the special election, Goughnour faced White Oak Council Member Chuck Davis, the Republican nominee. Goughnour emphasized continuing Gergely's "tradition of commitment throughout the Mon Valley" during his campaign. After winning the election he was sworn in on April 7, 2025.

== Personal life ==
Goughnour lives in McKeesport with his wife, Lauren, and their three children: Gavin, Gannon, and Gracelynn. His hobbies include boating, motorbiking, and outdoor activities with his family.

== Electoral history ==
2025 Pennsylvania House of Representatives District 35 special election (unofficial results)
Party	Candidate	Votes	%
Democratic	Dan Goughnour	6,797	63.37%
Republican	Charles Davis	3,751	34.97%
Libertarian	Adam Kitta	166	1.55%
Write-in		12	0.11%
Total votes		10,714	100
Democratic hold			
