= PATrain =

Commuter rail In Pittsburgh, Pennsylvania

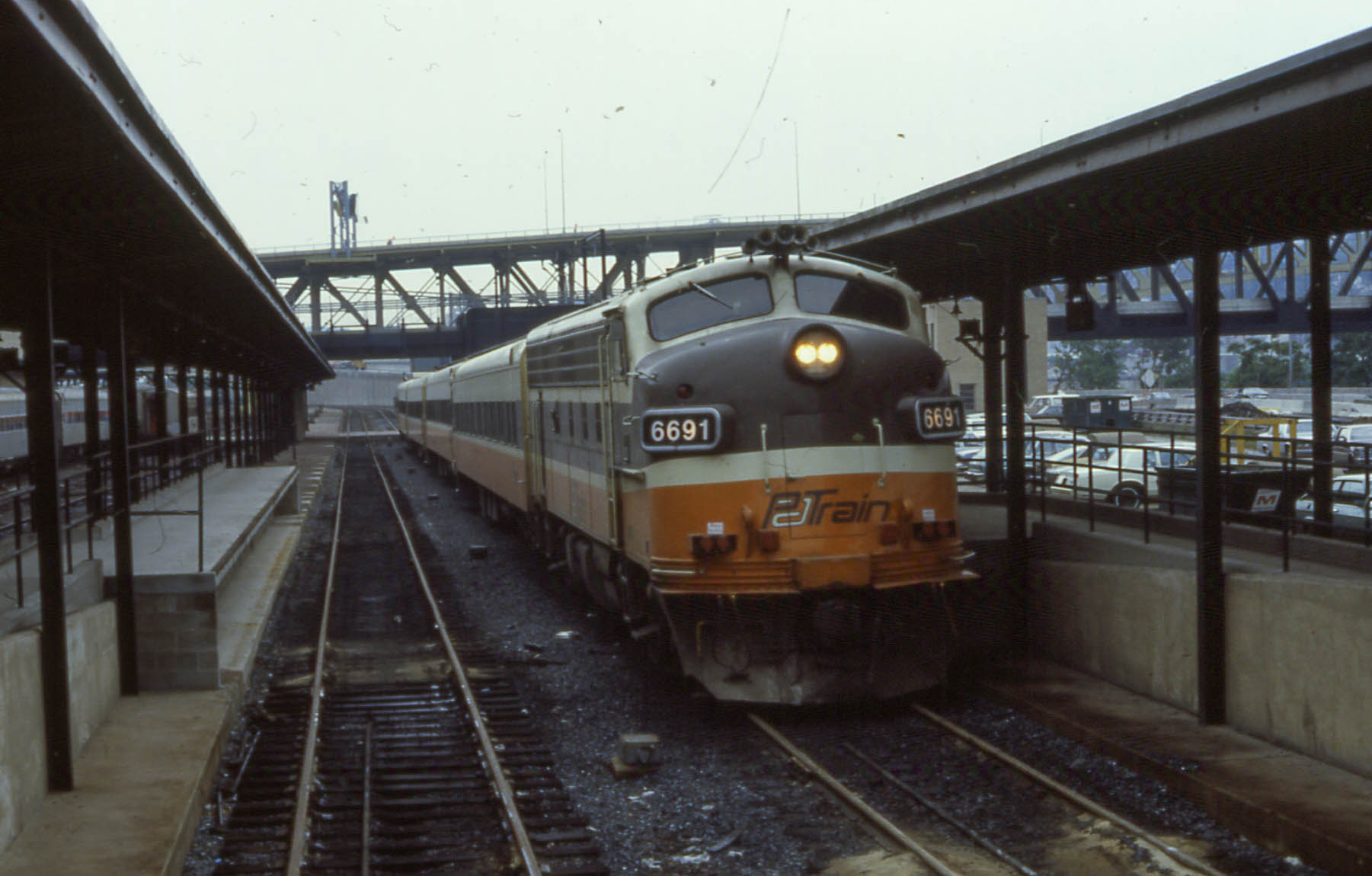
- PATrain in Pittsburgh in June 1985

Overview
- Service type: Commuter rail
- System: Port Authority of Allegheny County
- Status: Discontinued
- Locale: Monongahela Valley, Pennsylvania, U.S.
- First service: February 1, 1975
- Last service: April 28, 1989
- Former operators: Baltimore and Ohio Railroad; CSX (1987–1989)

Route
- Termini: Pittsburgh, Pennsylvania, U.S. Versailles, Pennsylvania, U.S.
- Stops: 5
- Distance travelled: 18.2 miles (29.3 km)
- Average journey time: 40 minutes
- Service frequency: Eight weekday round-trips (1983)
- Train number: 101–118 (1983)

Technical
- Track gauge: 4 ft 8 1/2 in (1,435 mm)
- Track owner: Baltimore and Ohio Railroad

The PATrain, also known as Mon Valley Commuter Rail, was a commuter rail service owned by the Port Authority of Allegheny County in the Monongahela Valley of Pennsylvania, US. Service began in 1975 when the Port Authority assumed ownership of the Pittsburgh–McKeesport–Versailles commuter trains operated by the Baltimore and Ohio Railroad (B&O) with the support of PennDOT. The Port Authority discontinued the service in 1989.

== History ==
=== Private operation ===
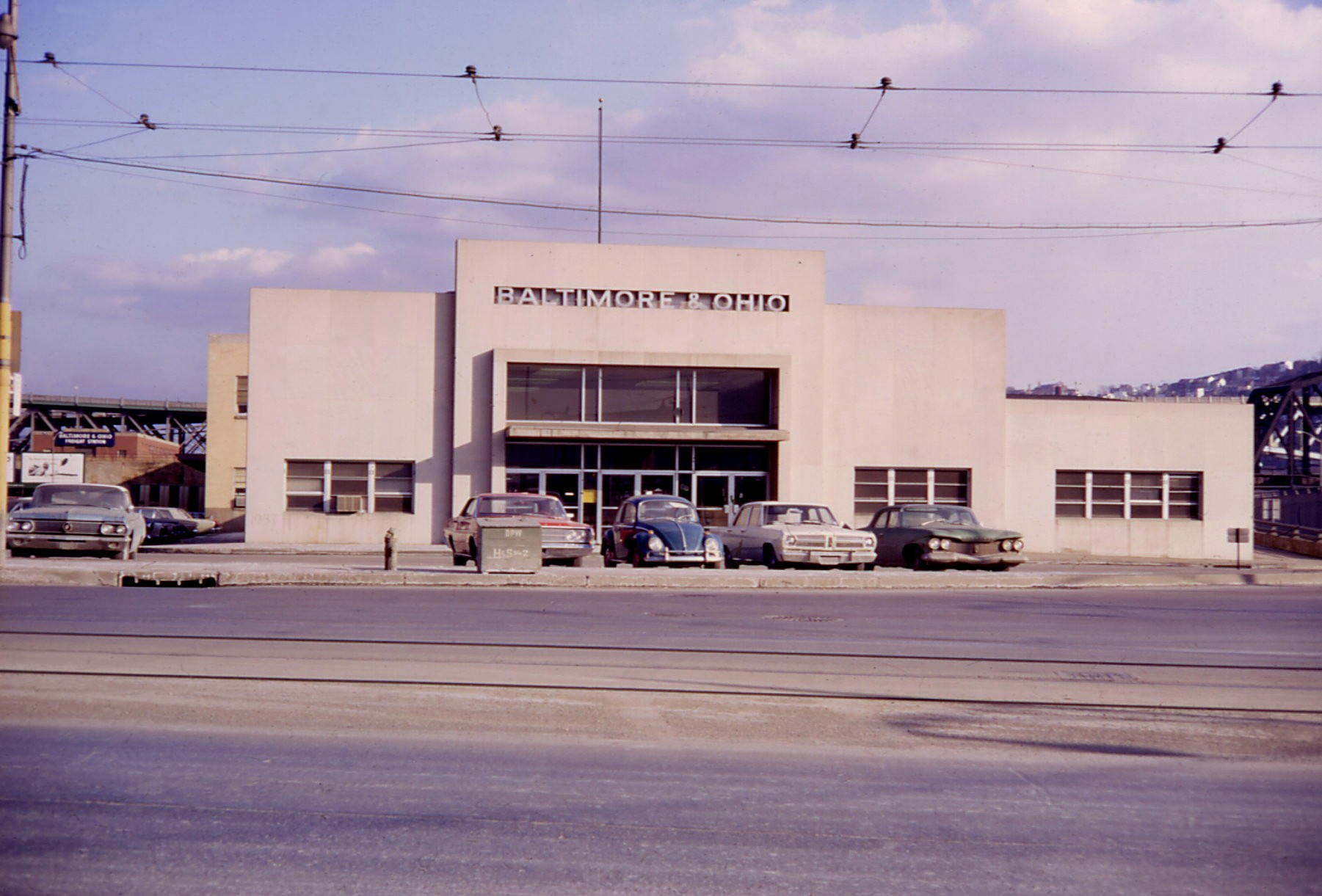
The B&O's Grant Street station in Pittsburgh in 1968

In the early 1970s, the Port Authority (PAT) – which had controlled all bus and streetcar service in Allegheny County since 1964 – had negotiated with the B&O and Pittsburgh and Lake Erie Railroad (P&LE), the last two private sector commuter operators in the region, about the possibility of expanded rail service. At the time, the B&O operated six weekday round trips between Pittsburgh and Versailles, while the P&LE operated a single weekday round trip between Pittsburgh and Beaver Falls. The Pennsylvania Railroad had ended service on its six commuter routes in 1964, citing lack of patronage.

It's no secret that we're losing money. People are just going to have to realize that highways are not the answer to the nation's transportation woes.

— Unnamed B&O official, 1972.

Neither the B&O nor the P&LE showed much interest in expanded service, citing existing operating losses and declining patronage. PAT then proposed that it take ownership of the B&O's service, with the B&O operating it under contract. The B&O trains made the run from McKeesport to Pittsburgh in 25 minutes, twice as fast as comparable bus service. Among the strongest supporters in the local government were then-mayor Peter F. Flaherty and County Commissioner William Hunt. Another champion was Harold Geissenheimer, PAT's director of transit operations.

In 1974, PAT estimated capital costs for a three-year trial at $1.7 million, plus $1.9 million in operating costs. The capital costs would be split between the federal government, the state of Pennsylvania, and the county, and would include the purchase of two locomotives and nine coaches. PAT would increase the existing two-car trains to four-car trains, while also increasing frequency of service. The per-passenger subsidy was estimated at 95 cents, compared to 6–13 cents for the typical bus passenger. Daily ridership then stood at 300; PAT's best case projection was 3,000. A proposal by Hunt to extend service further to Elizabeth was unsuccessful: the route was owned by the P&LE, which requested $500,000 to rehabilitate the line. This the state would not provide, as the line would still mostly carry P&LE freight traffic and not commuters.

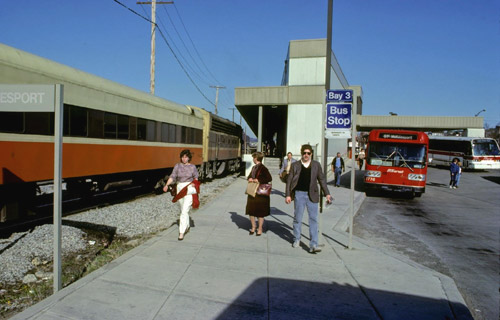
A train at McKeesport Transportation Center in March 1985

By mid-1977, daily ridership had grown to 1,400, a significant increase over the B&O days. On the other hand, the per-passenger subsidy stood at $2.77, nearly three times the 1974 projection, while the bus subsidy was 8 cents per passenger. Defenders pointed out that the figure included capital costs (including a payment of $10,000 per month to the B&O for equipment leasing), which inflated costs and made the comparison inexact. In addition, the PATrain made the trip between Versailles and Pittsburgh in 23 minutes, while it took over an hour by bus.

In 1978, PAT renewed its agreement with the B&O, and was finally able to secure the capital funding for the new equipment plus a new intermodal transportation center in McKeesport. The McKeesport Transportation Center opened on December 21, 1981. In addition to buses and the PATrain, the center saw service from Amtrak's Chicago–Washington Capitol Limited. Additional capital improvements included the construction of new park and ride lots at Braddock and Versailles and the addition of a new stop at Port Vue.

In mid-1979, service stood at eight round-trips Monday–Friday and five round-trips on Saturday. (There was no service on Sundays.) Three round-trips terminated at McKeesport, with the remainder continuing to Versailles. In a nod to railroad tradition, the Port Authority assigned names to the trains: PATrain, Early Bird, Pittsburgher, Golden Triangle, Shopper, Mid Day, Mon Valley, McKeesporter, and Youghiogheny.

=== Decline and discontinuance ===
Daily ridership peaked in 1981 at 1,800 during the reconstruction of Parkway East (which had spawned the short-lived PennDOT-operated Parkway Limited). By 1983 daily ridership had dropped below 1,300, spread over eight daily round trips. Operating expenses for FY 1982–83 were $1.8 million, of which only $500,000 was recovered. PAT's operations director cited multiple factors, including fare increases, van pools, and a generally poor economic situation in the Monongahela Valley.

PAT discontinued service after April 28, 1989, citing declining ridership and increasing operating losses. PAT instituted express bus service to cover the route.

== Equipment ==
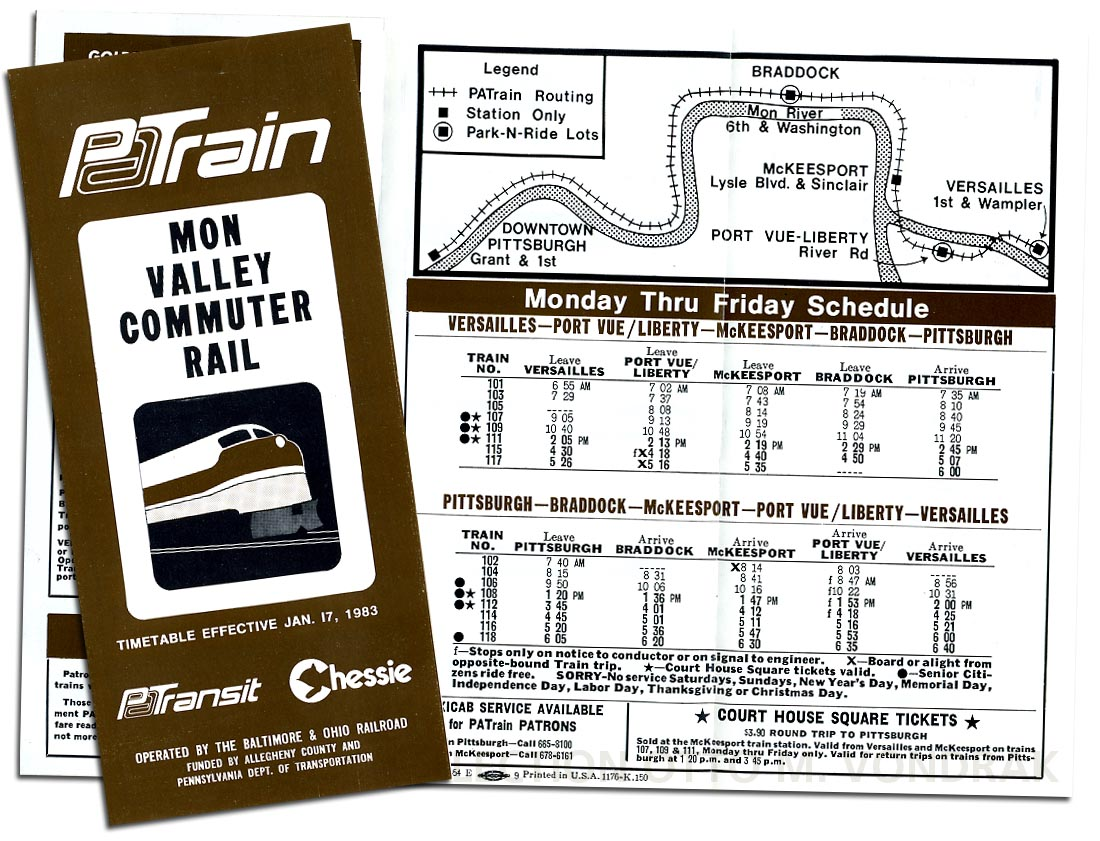
January 1983 PATrain timetable

Trains operated in push-pull mode. A typical consist in the 1980s was three-four coaches, the last of which was fitted for cab control. Motive power was provided by a pair of refurbished EMD F7A diesel-electric locomotives. The trains were painted in a brown-and-orange scheme. PAT owned ten ex-Chesapeake and Ohio Railway (C&O) coaches, all originally built by Pullman-Standard. At times Budd Rail Diesel Cars were used instead.

When service ended in 1989, the equipment was sold to the Connecticut Department of Transportation to bootstrap the new Shore Line East service. The equipment ran on Shore Line East until the late 1990s. The locomotives remained stored until being donated to the Galveston Railroad Museum in 2012.

== Route ==
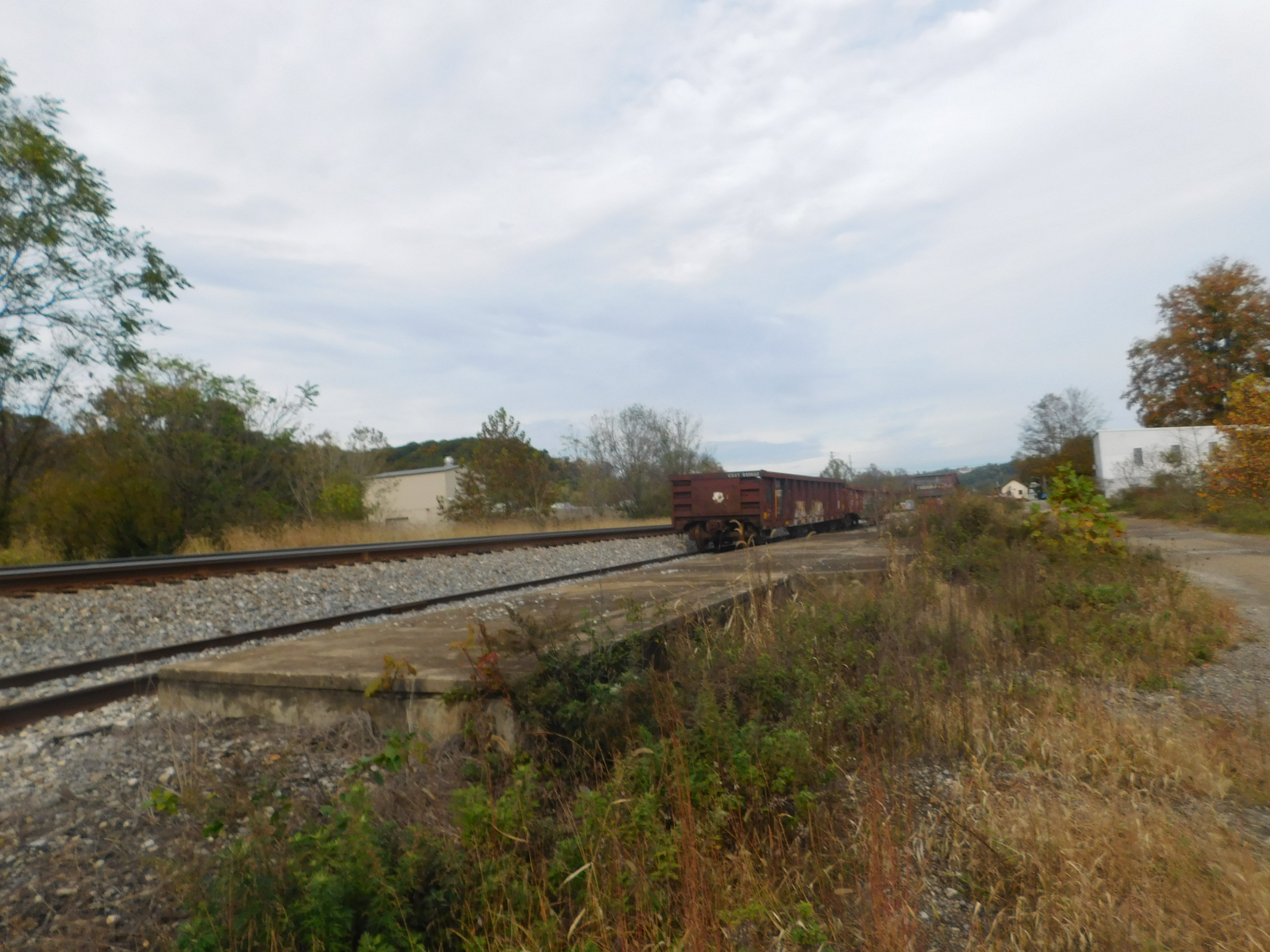
The former platform of the Versailles station in October 2021

Inbound PATrains originated at Versailles (1st & Wampler). They then used the P&LE Liberty Boro Bridge to cross the Youghiogheny River to reach Port Vue-Liberty (along River Road). Departing Port Vue, trains turned east and crossed the Youghiogheny a second time via the P&LE McKeesport Bridge to reach McKeesport (Lysle Boulevard & Sinclair). Trains then followed the north bank of the Monongahela River, heading north-northwest toward Braddock (6th & Washington). Finally, trains continued running west along the river to reach the B&O's Grant Street Station in downtown Pittsburgh. Grant Street was a commuter-only station; all B&O's intercity traffic used the P&LE's station on the opposite side of the river (now Station Square). Trains made intermediate stops at Hazelwood and Glenwood as late as 1976.
