= Pennsylvania House of Representatives, District 35 =

American legislative district

Pennsylvania's 35th State House of Representatives district
Representative
Daniel Goughnour
- Population (2022): 64,711

The 35th Pennsylvania House of Representatives District is located in southwest Pennsylvania and has been represented by Democrat Daniel Goughnour since 2025.

== District profile ==
The 35th Pennsylvania House of Representatives District is located in Allegheny County and includes the following areas:

- Clairton
- Duquesne
- Homestead
- Liberty
- Lincoln
- McKeesport
- Munhall
- Port Vue
- South Versailles Township
- Versailles
- West Homestead, Pennsylvania
- West Mifflin (part)
  - District 03
  - District 04
  - District 15
- Whitaker
- White Oak

== Representatives ==
Representative	Party	Years	District home	Note
Prior to 1969, seats were apportioned by county.
A. Joseph Valicenti	Democrat	1969 – 1978		
Thomas A. Michlovic	Democrat	1979 – 2002		
Marc Gergely	Democrat	2003 – 2017	White Oak	
Austin Davis	Democrat	2018 – 2022	McKeesport	Resigned December 7, 2022 following election as lieutenant governor of Pennsylvania
Matt Gergely	Democrat	2023 – 2025	McKeesport	Died January 19, 2025, following health complications; special election expected March 25, 2025
Daniel Goughnour	Democrat	2025 – Present	McKeesport	Won special election on March 25, 2025

== Recent election results ==
2025 Pennsylvania House of Representatives, District 35 special election
Party	Candidate	Votes	%
Democratic	Daniel Goughnour	6,825	63.47
Republican	Charles Davis	3,761	34.98
Libertarian	Adam Kitta	167	1.55
Total votes		10,753	100.00
Democratic hold			

PA House election, 2024: Pennsylvania House of Representatives, District 35
Party	Candidate	Votes	%
Democratic	Matt Gergely (incumbent)	Unopposed	
Total votes		23,550	100.00
Democratic hold			

2023 Pennsylvania House of Representatives, District 35 special election
Party	Candidate	Votes	%
Democratic	Matt Gergely	6,790	73.66
Republican	Don Nevills	2,302	24.97
Write-in		126	1.37
Total votes		9,218	100.00
Democratic hold			

PA House election, 2022: Pennsylvania House of Representatives, District 35
Party	Candidate	Votes	%
Democratic	Austin Davis (incumbent)	15,241	66.10
Republican	Donald Nevills	7,817	33.90
Total votes		23,058	100.00
Democratic hold			

PA House election, 2020: Pennsylvania House of Representatives, District 35
Party	Candidate	Votes	%
Democratic	Austin Davis (incumbent)	Unopposed	
Total votes		21,335	100.00
Democratic hold			

PA House election, 2018: Pennsylvania House of Representatives, District 35
Party	Candidate	Votes	%
Democratic	Austin Davis	Unopposed	
Total votes		15,165	100.00
Democratic hold			

2018 Pennsylvania House of Representatives, District 35 special election
Party	Candidate	Votes	%
Democratic	Austin Davis	3,209	73.97
Republican	Fawn Walker-Montgomery	1,129	26.03
Total votes		4,338	100.00
Democratic hold			

PA House election, 2016: Pennsylvania House of Representatives, District 35
Party	Candidate	Votes	%
Democratic	Marc Gergely (incumbent)	16,170	62.50
Republican	Fawn Walker-Montgomery	9,702	37.50
Total votes		25,872	100.00
Democratic hold			

PA House election, 2014: Pennsylvania House of Representatives, District 35
Party	Candidate	Votes	%
Democratic	Marc Gergely (incumbent)	10,048	71.30
Republican	Ken Peoples	4,045	28.70
Total votes		14,093	100.00
Democratic hold			

PA House election, 2012: Pennsylvania House of Representatives, District 35
Party	Candidate	Votes	%
Democratic	Marc Gergely (incumbent)	Unopposed	
Total votes		19,473	100.00
Democratic hold			

PA House election, 2010: Pennsylvania House of Representatives, District 35
Party	Candidate	Votes	%
Democratic	Marc Gergely (incumbent)	Unopposed	
Total votes		12,454	100.00
Democratic hold			
