= Matthew Gergely =

American politician (1979–2025)

Member of the Pennsylvania House of Representatives from the 35th district
- In office February 21, 2023 – January 19, 2025
- Preceded by: Austin Davis
- Succeeded by: Dan Goughnour

Personal details
- Born: October 5, 1979 McKeesport, Pennsylvania, U.S.
- Died: January 19, 2025 (aged 45)
- Party: Democratic
- Spouse: Holly
- Children: 2
- Relatives: Marc Gergely (brother)

Matthew Robert Gergely (October 5, 1979 – January 19, 2025) was an American politician. A Democrat, he was a member of the Pennsylvania House of Representatives, representing the 35th district from 2023 until his death in 2025.

== Early life and education ==
Gergely was born on October 5, 1979 in McKeesport, Pennsylvania. He was the son of Sofia and Robert Gergely. He graduated from McKeesport High School and earned a bachelor of science degree from Indiana University of Pennsylvania in 2002.

== Career ==
From 2012 to 2017, Gergely was chief of staff to the mayor of McKeesport, Pennsylvania. He was subsequently the business manager for McKeesport Area School District until 2020. Gergely then became McKeesport's chief revenue officer from 2022 to 2023.

In February 2023, Gergely won a special election to represent the 35th district in the Pennsylvania House of Representatives after Representative Austin Davis became the lieutenant governor of Pennsylvania. Gergely's victory in concurrence with two other special elections cemented Democrats' narrow majority in the House after vacancies following the 2022 election left control of the House in question. The 35th district was previously represented by Gergely's brother Marc.

Gergely had two bills he was the prime sponsor of signed into law. One sought to improve the testing of blood plasma, and the other gave licensed businesses more flexibility to serve alcohol.

== Death ==
In December 2024, Gergely suffered a medical emergency. The exact circumstances were not publicly disclosed. He was hospitalized and was thus unable to attend the swearing-in ceremony for legislators on January 7, 2025. Democratic leader Matt Bradford said that Gergely was not expected to be in attendance “for some foreseeable time.” Fellow Representative Andrew Kuzma described Gergely's hospitalization status as critical but stable on January 6. Gergely's absence left the chamber with a partisan tie. During the election for Speaker of the House, Republican leader Jesse Topper withdrew his name after the first tied ballot to avoid deadlock, allowing Democrat Joanna McClinton to be reelected speaker. Topper also wished Gergely a full and speedy recovery in remarks on the House floor. Gergely later died on January 19. He was 45.

== Electoral history ==
2023 Pennsylvania House of Representatives special election
Party	Candidate	Votes	%
Democratic	Matthew Gergely	6,792	73.67
Republican	Don Nevills	2,302	24.97
Write-in		126	1.37
Total votes		9,218	100.00
Democratic hold			

2024 Pennsylvania House of Representatives election: Pennsylvania House of Representatives, District 35
Party	Candidate	Votes	%
Democratic	Matthew Gergely (incumbent)	Unopposed	
Total votes		23,550	100.00
Democratic hold			
