= McKeesport Transportation Center =

McKeesport, PA
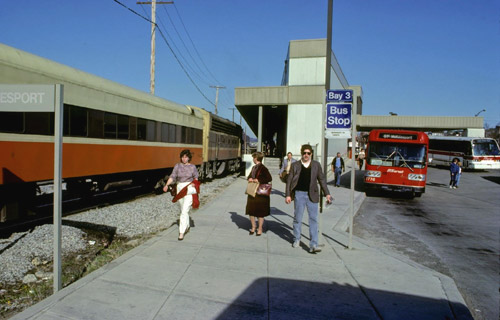

General information
- Location: 541 Lysle Boulevard; McKeesport, Pennsylvania
- Coordinates: 40.3522°N 79.8610°W
- Operated by: Port Authority of Allegheny County
- Line: Pittsburgh Subdivision

Construction
- Parking: Yes

History
- Rebuilt: 2017

Former services
Preceding station	Amtrak	Following station
Pittsburgh toward Chicago	Capitol Limited	Connellsville toward Washington, D.C.
Preceding station	Port Authority of Allegheny County	Following station
Braddock toward Grant Street	PATrain	Port Vue-Liberty toward Versailles
Preceding station	Baltimore and Ohio Railroad	Following station
Riverton toward Chicago	Main Line	Christy Park toward Jersey City
Location

The McKeesport Transportation Center is a bus, and formerly train, station located in McKeesport, Pennsylvania.

== History ==
The station was served by the PATrain commuter rail service between Versailles and Pittsburgh, and its predecessor, the Baltimore and Ohio Railroad operated Pittsburgh - Mckeesport - Versailles commuter service. Amtrak's Capitol Limited began stopping in McKeesport in 1982.

PATrain service was discontinued in April 1989, and replaced by an express bus service from McKeesport. The Capitol Limited ceased to stop in 1991, and in the months prior an average of one passenger boarded at McKeesport per journey.

The McKeesport Transportation Center has remained the primary transit hub of the greater McKeesport area. In response to significant cutbacks to routes in the region by the Port Authority of Allegheny County, Heritage Community Transportation began serving the station in 2014.

In 2017 the complex underwent a $1 million redevelopment, which included demolition of aging structures, new road and parking surfaces, Port Authority driver rest facilities and new shelters.

== Services ==
The McKeesport Transportation Center is currently served by the Port Authority of Allegheny County and Heritage Community Transportation.

The current Port Authority routes are the 56 Lincoln Place, 61C McKeesport-Homestead and P7 McKeesport Flyer. A number of additional routes stop kerbside on Lyle Boulevard. The current Heritage route serves a number of adjacent communities.

== Facilities ==
There is a park and ride lot by the station.
