= McKeesport Bridge (Pittsburgh and Lake Erie Railroad) =

P&LE McKeesport Bridge
- Coordinates: 40°21′N 79°52′W
- Carries: CSX Keystone Subdivision
- Crosses: Youghiogheny River
- Locale: McKeesport, Pennsylvania

Characteristics
- Design: Truss bridge
- Total length: 781 feet
- Clearance below: 31 ft

History
- Opened: 1968

The P&LE McKeesport Bridge is an American truss bridge which spans the Youghiogheny River and connects the east and west banks of the Pittsburgh industrial suburb of McKeesport, Pennsylvania.

== History and architectural features ==
In 1968, the Pittsburgh & Lake Erie Railroad undertook a major construction project in conjunction with the B&O Railroad to clear tracks from downtown McKeesport. These tracks caused traffic congestion and posed a safety hazard. As a result, both this bridge and the nearby P&LE Liberty Boro Bridge were created to direct rail traffic to the west bank of the river, which featured a less confusing street grid.

Before the construction of this structure, an elaborate 1881 bridge stood on the site, which connected two P&LE lines. With both the P&LE and B&O having ceased operations, the structure currently serves the Pittsburgh-to-Cumberland, Maryland CSX Keystone Subdivision.
