= Grant Street Station =

Pittsburgh
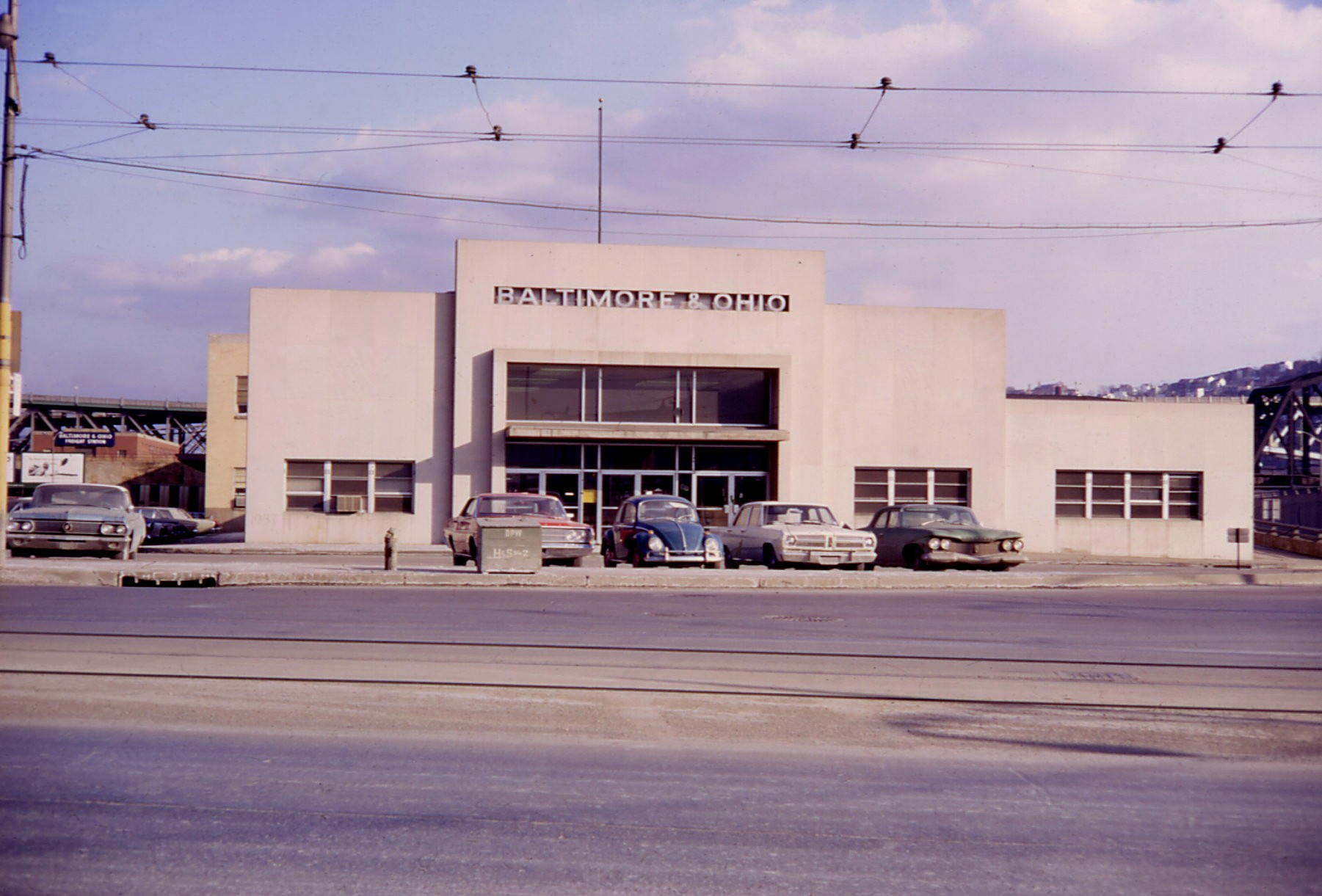
- Grant Street B&O Station in 1968

General information
- Location: Grant & 1st Pittsburgh, PA
- Coordinates: 40°26′10″N 79°59′54″W
- System: Commuter rail
- Owner: B&O/CSXT

History
- Opened: 1957
- Closed: 1989

Former services
Preceding station	Port Authority of Allegheny County	Following station
Terminus	PATrain	Braddock toward Versailles
Location

Grant Street Station, also known as the B&O Pittsburgh Terminal, was a passenger rail station on Grant Street in downtown Pittsburgh, Pennsylvania. The Baltimore and Ohio Railroad (B&O) announced plans for it on May 3, 1955, after selling the original B&O Station bordering the Monongahela River to the state for construction of Interstate 376. It opened in 1957 to serve commuter rail traffic; all intercity traffic continued to use the Pittsburgh and Lake Erie Railroad's (P&LE) station (now called Station Square). However during the late 1950s the B&O ran a two-car (RDC'S) inter-city train to/from Washington DC. If traffic warranted, three units were used as a single train. They were nicknamed "Daylighters" because of their morning departures and late afternoon arrivals. Grant Street was the last such privately owned train station built in Pennsylvania.

After the Port Authority of Allegheny County (PAT) assumed control of the B&O's Pittsburgh–McKeesport–Versailles commuter route in 1975 (which it re-branded PATrain), Grant Street continued to serve as the Pittsburgh depot for this service. PAT discontinued the service in 1989; Grant Street itself was demolished in 1998. The site is now home to PNC Firstside Complex and the First Avenue light rail station.

== See also ==
- Eliza Furnace Trail
- Union Station (Pittsburgh)
- Wabash Pittsburgh Terminal
