= Khaleke Hudson =

American football player (born 1997)

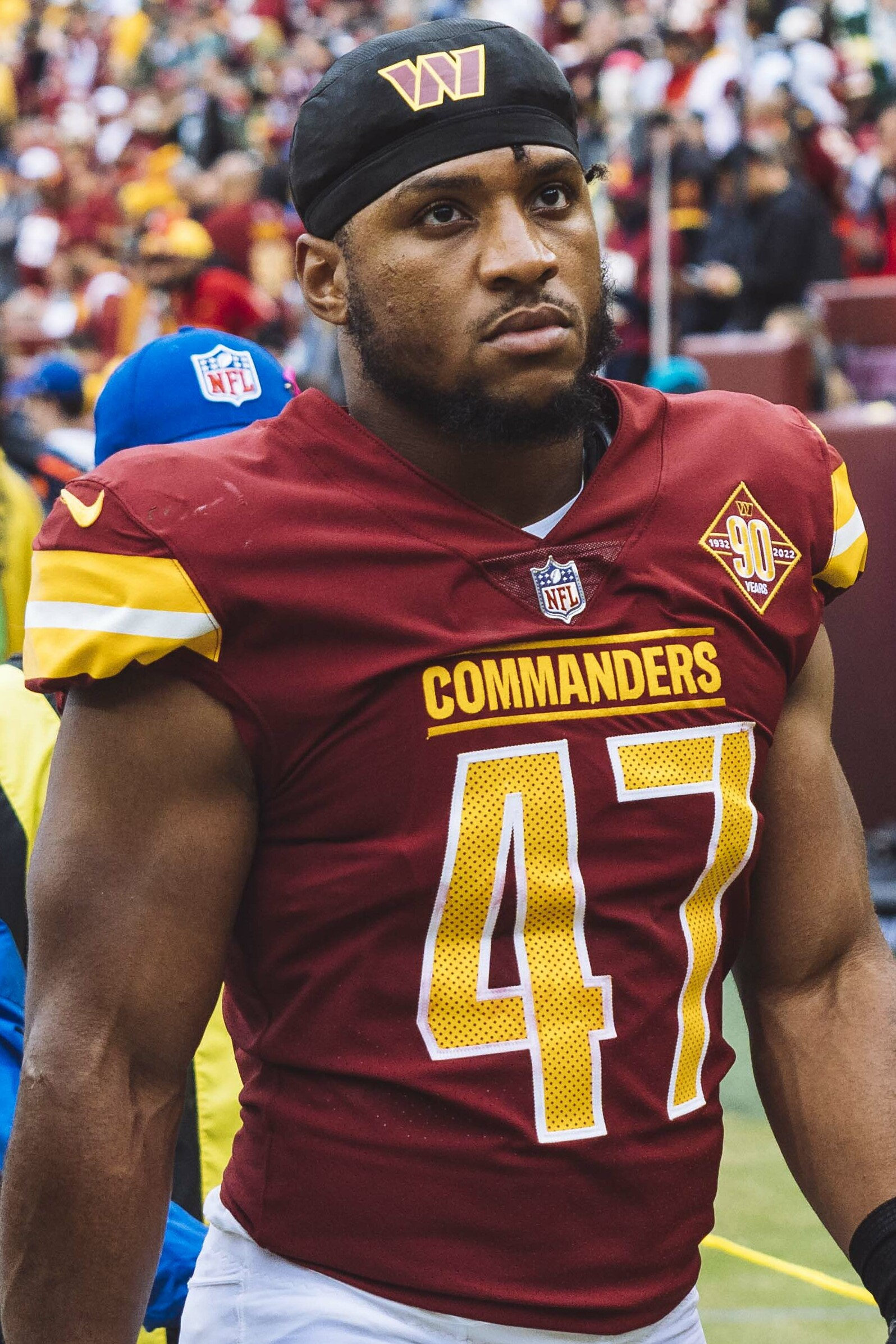
- Hudson with the Washington Commanders in 2022

Profile
- Position: Linebacker

Personal information
- Born: December 6, 1997 (age 28); McKeesport, Pennsylvania, U.S.
- Listed height: 6 ft 0 in (1.83 m)
- Listed weight: 220 lb (100 kg)

Career information
- High school: McKeesport
- College: Michigan (2016–2019)
- NFL draft: 2020: 5th round, 162nd overall pick

Career history
- Washington Football Team / Commanders (2020–2023); New Orleans Saints (2024)*; Cleveland Browns (2024); Tennessee Titans (2025)*
- * Offseason or practice squad member only

Awards and highlights
- 2× second-team All-Big Ten (2017, 2019)

Career NFL statistics as of 2025
- Total tackles: 117
- Sacks: 1
- Pass deflections: 2
- Stats at Pro Football Reference

Khaleke Hudson (born December 6, 1997) is an American professional football linebacker. He played college football for the Michigan Wolverines, twice named an All-Big Ten selection. He was selected by the Washington Commanders in the fifth round of the 2020 NFL draft. He has also been a member of the New Orleans Saints, Cleveland Browns, and Tennessee Titans. Hudson shares an NCAA record for most tackles for a loss in a game with eight, doing so in 2017.

== Early life ==
Hudson attended McKeesport Area High School in Pennsylvania where he played safety and running back. He was recruited by several top programs as a two-way player. At the time of his January 27, 2016 commitment to Michigan he was the number one rated football prospect in the Pennsylvania statewide class of 2016 according to Scout.com and the number 10 rated player on Rivals. He had offers from Pittsburgh, UCLA, and Penn State.

College recruiting
Name	Hometown	School	Height	Weight	40^{‡}	Commit date
Khaleke Hudson; ATH	McKeesport, Pennsylvania	McKeesport H.S.	5 ft 11 in (1.80 m)	195 lb (88 kg)	4.81	Jan 27, 2016
Khaleke Hudson; ATH	Recruit ratings: Scout: Rivals: 247Sports: ESPN:					
Overall recruit ranking:
‡ Refers to 40-yard dash; Note: In many cases, Scout, Rivals, 247Sports, On3, and ESPN may conflict in their listings of height, weight and 40 time.; In these cases, the average was taken. ESPN grades are on a 100-point scale.; Sources: "Michigan Football Commitments". Rivals.; "2016 Michigan Football Commits". Scout.; "ESPN". ESPN.; "Scout.com Team Recruiting Rankings". Scout.; "2016 Team Ranking". Rivals.com.

== College career ==
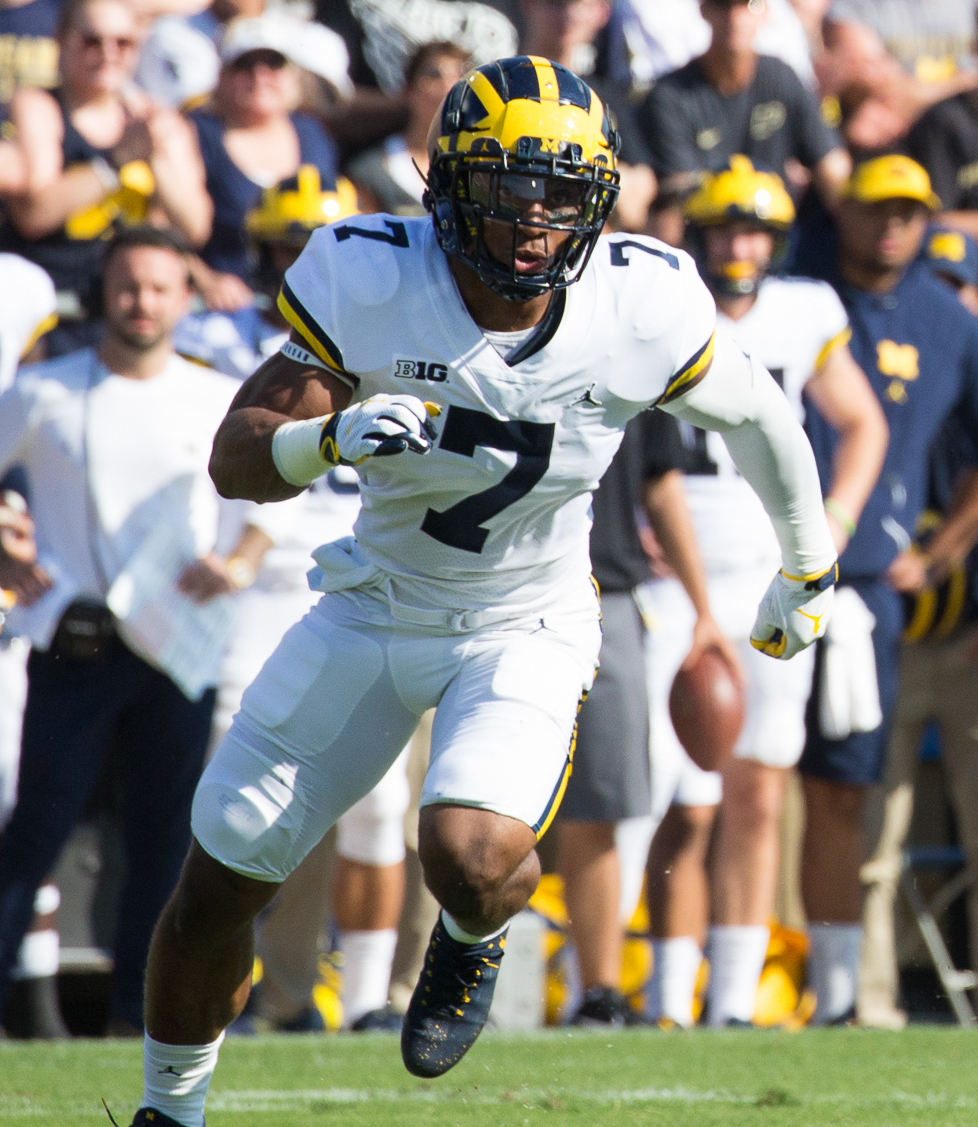
Hudson with Michigan in 2017

Hudson made his debut on September 3, 2016, against Hawaii. In the 2016 campaign, Khaleke made an appearance in all 13 games primarily on special teams. Khaleke only appeared in 2 games as a Safety, and was the Special Teams Player of the Game after a home win against Illinois. On November 4, 2017, he set the school single-game record with eight tackles for loss against Minnesota in the Little Brown Jug rivalry game, earning Big Ten Conference Co-Defensive Player of the week. Hudson was recognized as the FWAA/Bronko Nagurski National Defensive Player of the Week for the effort (15 total tackles, 12 of which were solo, 3 quarterback sacks, and a forced fumble), which tied an NCAA single-game record and set a Big Ten Conference tackle for loss record. Following the 2017 season, Hudson, who was second in the conference in tackles for loss for the season, earned third-team All-Big Ten recognition from the coaches.

Prior to his junior season in 2018, Hudson was named to preseason watch lists for the Lott Trophy and Bronko Nagurski Trophy. He was named preseason first-team all-Big Ten by Athlon Sports. Hudson appeared in all 13 games for the Wolverines but assumed a lesser role in the defense than his sophomore season. He finished with three tackles for loss and 39 total tackles on the year, and was named an honorable mention all-conference selection by both media and coaches.

As a senior, Hudson was named to the preseason watchlist for the Butkus Award. During the 2019 season, Hudson was Michigan's leading tackler with a career-best 97 stops, including 3.5 for loss with two sacks. He added three pass breakups, three quarterback hurries, and a blocked kick. In the following season Hudson was named to second-team 2019 All-Big Ten.

== Professional career ==
Pre-draft measurables
Height	Weight	Arm length	Hand span	40-yard dash	10-yard split	20-yard split	Vertical jump	Broad jump	Bench press
5 ft 11 in (1.80 m)	224 lb (102 kg)	29 3/8 in (0.75 m)	10 in (0.25 m)	4.56 s	1.51 s	2.67 s	33.0 in (0.84 m)	10 ft 0 in (3.05 m)	30 reps
All values from NFL Combine

=== Washington Football Team / Commanders ===
Hudson was selected by the Washington Football Team in the fifth round (162nd overall) of the 2020 NFL draft. Washington previously acquired this selection in a trade that sent Quinton Dunbar to the Seattle Seahawks. He signed his four-year rookie contract with the team on July 23, 2020.

On December 7, 2021, Hudson was placed on injured reserve after suffering an ankle injury in the Week 13 game against the Las Vegas Raiders.

On August 30, 2022, Hudson was waived by the Commanders and signed to the practice squad the next day. He was promoted to the active roster on October 21. He signed a one-year contract extension on March 12, 2023.

=== New Orleans Saints ===
On April 4, 2024, Hudson signed with the New Orleans Saints. He was released on August 27, and re-signed to the practice squad.

=== Cleveland Browns ===
On September 11, 2024, Hudson was signed by the Cleveland Browns off the Saints practice squad.

=== Tennessee Titans ===
On August 12, 2025, Hudson signed with the Tennessee Titans. He was released by Tennessee on August 19.
