= Stella Tsai =

American judge

Judge of the Commonwealth Court of Pennsylvania
- Incumbent
- Assumed office January 5, 2026
- Preceded by: Ellen Ceisler

Personal details
- Born: 1963 (age 62–63)
- Party: Democratic
- Education: University of Pennsylvania (JD); Pennsylvania State University(BA)

Stella Ming Tsai (born 1963) is an American judge who has served as a judge of the Commonwealth Court of Pennsylvania since 2026. She previously served on the Philadelphia Court of Common Pleas.

== Education ==
Tsai graduated from the University of Pennsylvania and Pennsylvania State University.

== Career ==
Tsai was first appointed to the Philadelphia Court of Common Pleas in 2016. Soon after, she won an election to serve a ten-year term on the court. She ran for a seat on the Commonwealth Court in 2025. She won the Democratic primary unopposed on May 19. She defeated Matthew Wolford, the Republican nominee, on November 4.
