= Liberty Boro Bridge (Pittsburgh and Lake Erie Railroad) =

P&LE Liberty Boro Bridge
- Coordinates: 40°19′30″N 79°50′36″W
- Carries: CSX Keystone Subdivision
- Crosses: Youghiogheny River
- Locale: Liberty, Pennsylvania and McKeesport, Pennsylvania

Characteristics
- Design: Girder bridge

History
- Opened: 1968

The P&LE Liberty Boro Bridge is a girder bridge across the Youghiogheny River connecting the Pittsburgh industrial suburbs of Liberty and McKeesport, Pennsylvania. In 1968, the Pittsburgh & Lake Erie Railroad undertook a major construction project in conjunction with the B&O Railroad to clear tracks from downtown McKeesport. These tracks caused traffic congestion and posed a safety hazard. As a result, both this bridge and the nearby P&LE McKeesport Bridge were created to direct rail traffic to the west bank of the river, which featured a less confusing street grid.

While its sister structure is a truss bridge that crosses the river parallel to a highway bridge, the Liberty Boro Bridge appears relatively utilitarian and crosses the river at a nearly diagonal angle. The structure currently serves the Pittsburgh-to-Cumberland, Maryland CSX Keystone Subdivision.
