= McKeesport Area School District =

School district

Coordinates: 40.346024°N 79.835828°W

Address
- 3590 O'Neil Boulevard McKeesport, Pennsylvania, 15132-1145; United States

District information
- Type: Public
- Motto: Every Child, Every Day
- Grades: Pre-K–12
- Established: 1884
- Schools: 5
- NCES District ID: 4218990

Students and staff
- Students: 3,385 (2016-17)
- Staff: 236 (2016–17)
- Colors: Red and blue

Other information
- Website: District website

The McKeesport Area School District is a school district serving the City of McKeesport, and boroughs of Versailles, Dravosburg and White Oak (except for a small portion) and South Versailles Township (except for a small portion). Established in 1884, it encompasses approximately 7 square miles (18 km^{2}) and serves approximately 3,400 students.

== Schools ==
The McKeesport Area School District operates two elementary schools; Francis McClure and Twin Rivers, one middle school; Founder's Hall and one high school; the McKeesport Area High School. The district also operates the McKeesport Area Technology Center, which provides career and technical education programs to 10th, 11th, and 12th grade students.

== Extracurriculars ==
The district offers a variety of clubs, activities and sports.

=== Sports ===
The District funds:

Boys

- Baseball – AAAA
- Basketball- AAAA
- Cross Country – AAA
- Football – AAAA
- Golf – AAA
- Soccer – AAA
- Swimming and Diving – AAA
- Tennis – AAA
- Track and Field – AAA
- Wrestling – AAA

Girls

- Basketball – AAAA
- Cross Country – AAA
- Golf – AAA
- Soccer (Fall) – AAA
- Softball – AAAA
- Swimming and Diving – AAA
- Girls' Tennis – AAA
- Track and Field – AAA
- Volleyball – AAA

Founders Hall Sports

Boys

- Baseball
- Basketball
- Football
- Soccer
- Swimming and Diving
- Track and Field
- Wrestling

Girls

- Basketball
- Softball
- Soccer
- Swimming and Diving
- Track and Field
- Volleyball

According to PIAA directory July 2012
