= Carnegie Library of McKeesport =

- Carnegie Free Library
- U.S. National Register of Historic Places
- Pittsburgh Landmark – PHLF
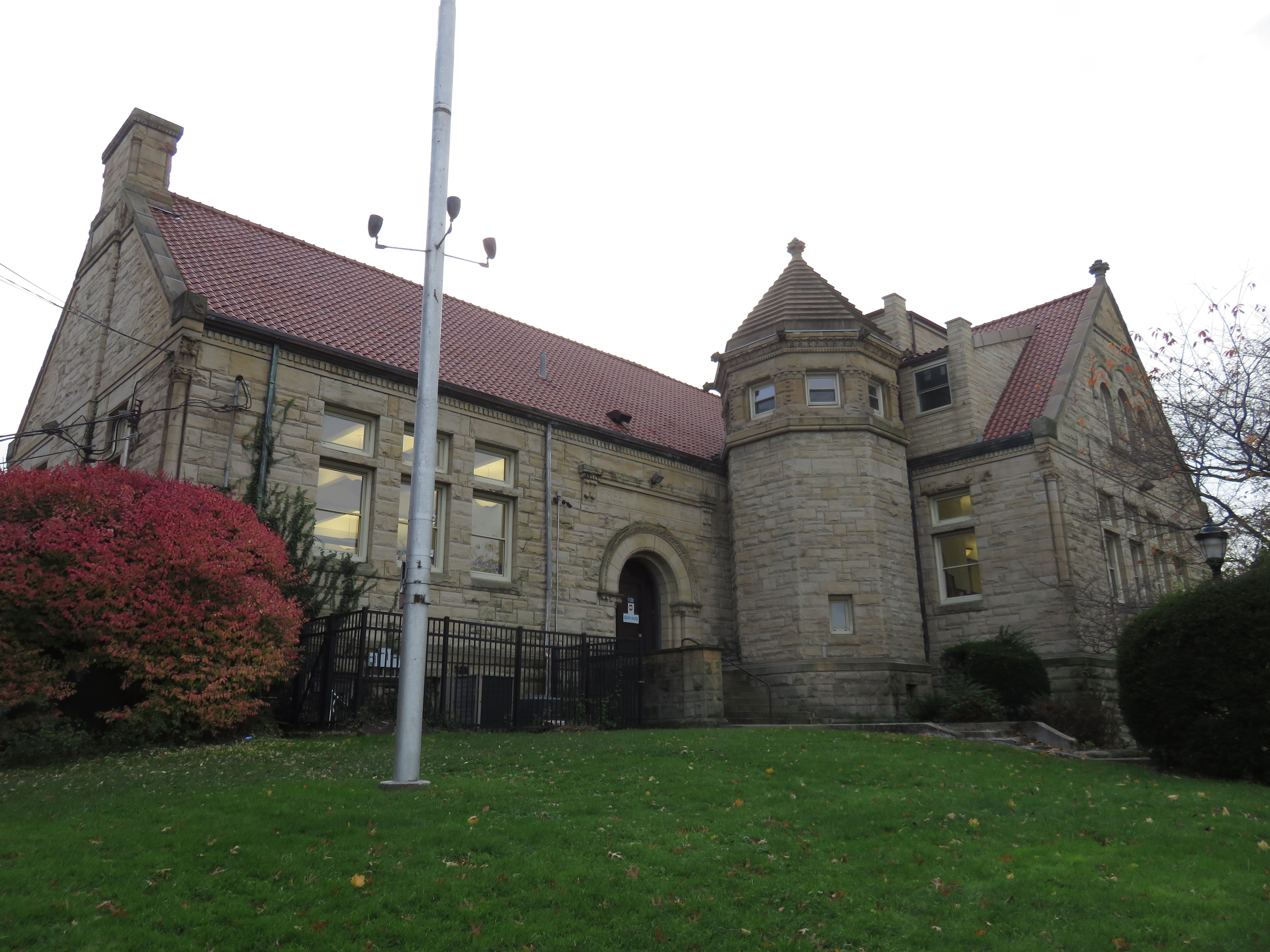

- Location within Pennsylvania Location within the United States
- Location: 1507 Library Ave., McKeesport, Pennsylvania
- Coordinates: 40°20′42″N 79°51′20″W
- Area: 1.5 acres (0.61 ha)
- Built: 1902
- Architects: East, William J.; Stratton, Daniel
- Architectural style: Romanesque, Richardsonian Romanesque
- NRHP reference No.: 80003402

Significant dates
- Added to NRHP: October 15, 1980
- Designated PHLF: 1979

The Carnegie Library of McKeesport, is a public library built with funds from Pittsburgh steel magnate Andrew Carnegie. McKeesport is located about 15 miles up the Monongahela River from Pittsburgh. The grant for this library was commissioned April 2, 1899. Out of approximately 1,688 libraries funded by Carnegie in America, McKeesport's was the 12th to be commissioned. It was listed on the National Register of Historic Places in 1980.
