= Marc Gergely =

American politician (born 1969)

Marc J. Gergely

Member of the Pennsylvania House of Representatives from the 35th district
- In office January 7, 2003 – August 11, 2017
- Preceded by: Thomas A. Michlovic
- Succeeded by: Austin Davis

Personal details
- Born: October 17, 1969 (age 56) McKeesport, Pennsylvania
- Party: Democratic
- Spouse: Debbie Gergely
- Relations: Matthew Gergely (brother)
- Children: Nicole, Andrew (AJ), Olivia
- Education: Indiana University of Pennsylvania

Marc J. Gergely (born October 17, 1969) is a former Democratic Party member of the Pennsylvania House of Representatives representing the 35th District and was elected in 2002. He was the Deputy Whip and was the only Democrat from Allegheny County to serve on the Labor Committee.

== Early life ==
Gergely attended Indiana University of Pennsylvania. He began his working career by working for state Senator Albert "Buddy" Belan. He became the head of the McKeesport, Pennsylvania school district at age 26.

== Political career ==
Gergely later worked as a director of the David Lawrence Convention Center in Pittsburgh. Prior to his election to the House, he was employed as a legislative assistant to state Senator Sean Logan.

In 2006 Gergely defeated former Duquesne Mayor George Matta II (53% - 47%). Matta ran what the Pittsburgh Post-Gazette called a "deceptive campaign". Matta falsely claimed Gergely voted for, and took, the controversial 2005 late night pay-raise. The Post-Gazette said, "At first such advertising would seem to be the product of some political Darth Vader. But given how easily it is debunked, it is more like the work of Vader's dim-witted brother.... We don't know who George Matta's media mastermind is, but the person should be fired. And Mr. Matta owes an apology to the Post-Gazette and the people of the 35th District -- they, as much as Rep. Gergely, have been the victims of a campaign of misinformation."

On September 7, 2013, Gergely was linked to an illegal gambling operation. He released a statement on September 9, 2013, described by the Pittsburgh Post-Gazette as "vague" and revealing little about the "relationship" he is recorded alluding to with Mr. Ronald "Pork" Melocchi. In August 2017, Gergely pleaded guilty to counts of conspiracy and accepting an illegal campaign contribution.

His brother Matthew Gergely also represented the same district from 2023 to 2025.
