= Austin Davis (politician) =

American politician (born 1989)

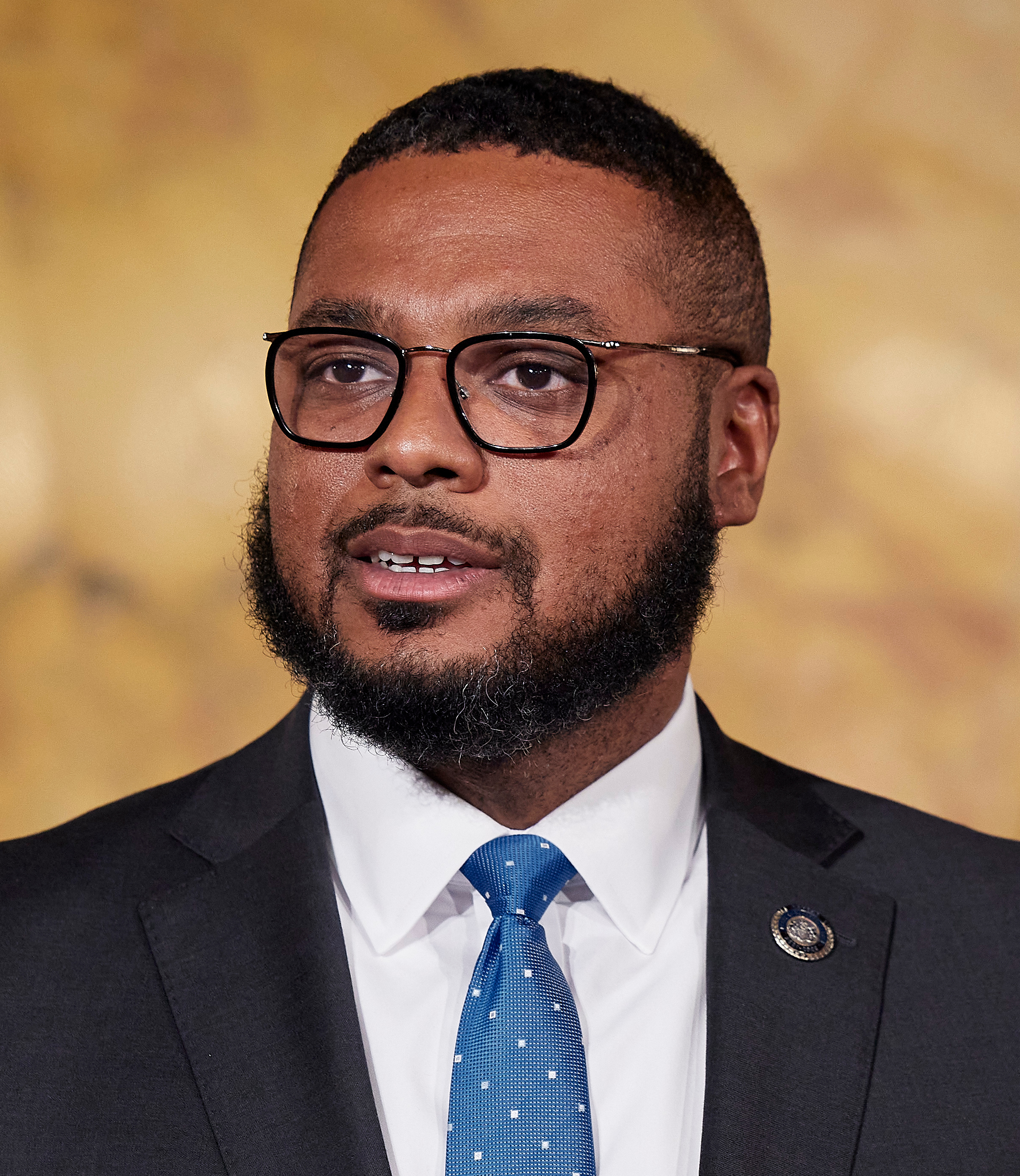
- Davis in 2022

35th Lieutenant Governor of Pennsylvania
- Incumbent
- Assumed office January 17, 2023
- Governor: Josh Shapiro
- Preceded by: Kim Ward (acting)

Member of the Pennsylvania House of Representatives from the 35th district
- In office February 5, 2018 – December 7, 2022
- Preceded by: Marc Gergely
- Succeeded by: Matthew Gergely

Personal details
- Born: Austin Ankarie Davis; October 4, 1989 (age 36) McKeesport, Pennsylvania, U.S.
- Party: Democratic
- Spouse: Blayre Holmes (m. 2017)
- Children: 1
- Education: University of Pittsburgh, Greensburg (BA)

Austin Ankarie Davis (born October 4, 1989) is an American politician serving as the 35th lieutenant governor of Pennsylvania since 2023. A member of the Democratic Party, Davis previously served as a member of the Pennsylvania House of Representatives for the 35th district from 2018 to 2022. He is both the first African-American lieutenant governor of Pennsylvania and the youngest person to be elected lieutenant governor in the United States.

== Early life and education ==
Davis was born October 4, 1989, in McKeesport, Pennsylvania. He attended McKeesport Area High School, where he founded and served as chairman of the Mayor's Youth Advisory Council under then-mayor of McKeesport, Jim Brewster.

After graduating from high school, he attended the University of Pittsburgh at Greensburg, where he earned a BA in political science in 2012.

== Career ==
While in college, Davis was hired as a legislative intern by the Pennsylvania House of Representatives. In a February 2011 article on Black History Month, the Pittsburgh Tribune-Review highlighted him as "a veteran at the politics of helping others."

Davis previously served as executive assistant to Allegheny County executive Rich Fitzgerald. In 2014, Davis became the youngest and the first black vice chair at the Allegheny County Democratic Committee.

=== Pennsylvania House of Representatives ===
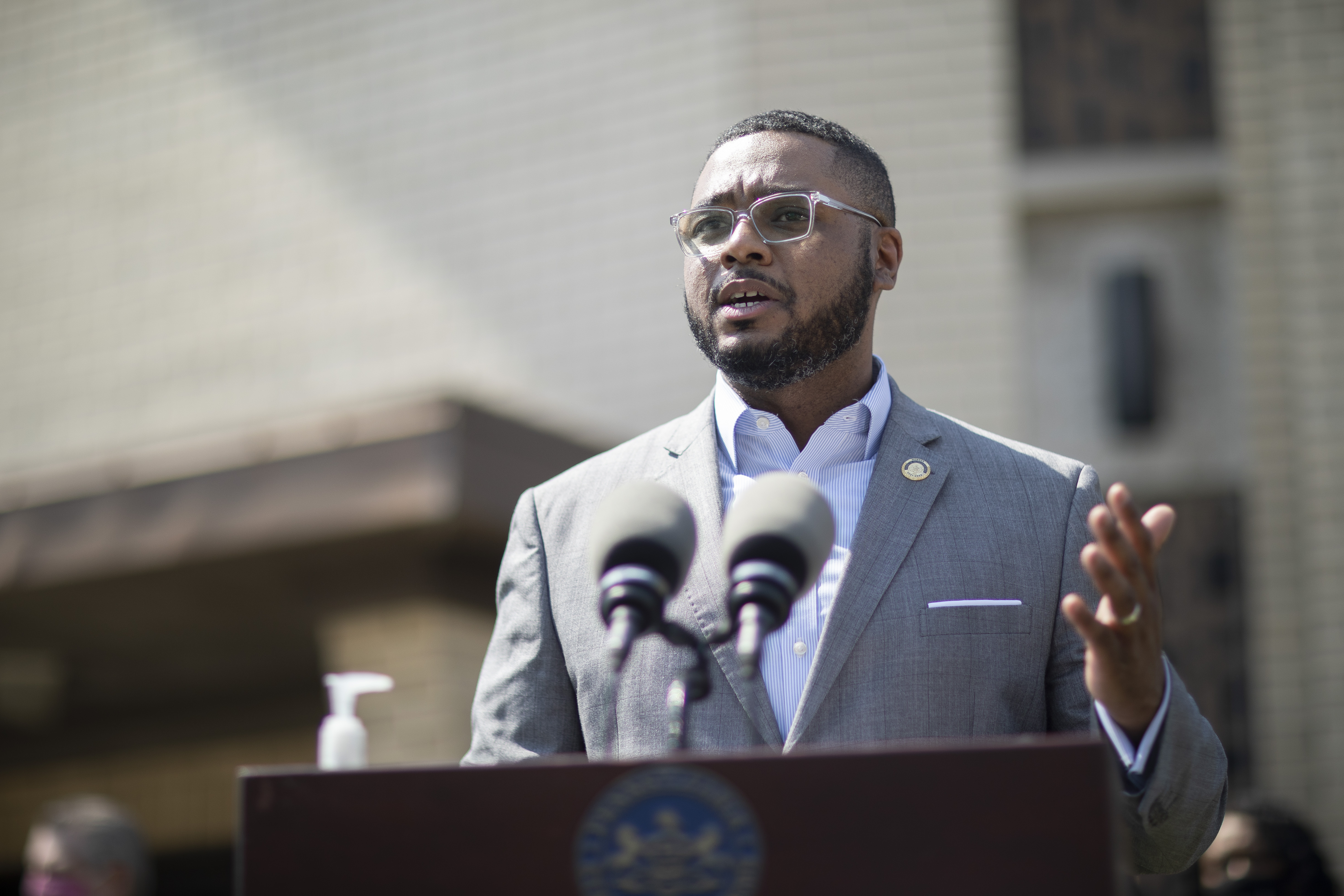
Davis in 2021

Davis ran for the Pennsylvania House of Representatives in the 35th district in a 2018 special election. Davis defeated Republican candidate Fawn Walker-Montgomery with over 73% of the vote and became the first African American to serve as State Representative for the district.

==== Committee assignments ====
(2021–2022)

- Appropriations
- Consumer Affairs
- Insurance
- Transportation

=== Lieutenant Governor of Pennsylvania ===
==== Election ====
Davis' 2022 logo for his campaign for Pennsylvania lieutenant governor

On December 14, 2021, it was reported that Davis would enter the 2022 race for Lieutenant Governor of Pennsylvania, after being selected by presumptive Democratic gubernatorial nominee Josh Shapiro to be his running mate. Pennsylvania law requires that a lieutenant gubernatorial candidate must run independent of the gubernatorial candidate in the primary.

On November 8, 2022, Shapiro and Davis handily defeated the Republican ticket of Doug Mastriano and Carrie DelRosso in the general election. Davis became the first African American to be elected lieutenant governor and the first millennial to win statewide office in Pennsylvania.

==== Tenure ====
Upon his swearing in at age 33, Davis became the youngest lieutenant governor in Pennsylvania history. He is also the youngest current lieutenant governor in the United States. In 2024, Davis was chosen as the chair of the Democratic Lieutenant Governors Association.

== Personal life ==
Davis met his wife, Blayre Holmes, the Director of Community Relations for the Pittsburgh Steelers, at the August Wilson Center in 2012. The two were married on September 1, 2017. They live in Allegheny County, Pennsylvania. The couple had their first child, a daughter, in September of 2023.

Davis has served on the board of directors of the YMCA of Greater Pittsburgh, The Consortium for Public Education, Communities in Schools of Pittsburgh, Auberle, Adonai Center for Black Males, Small Seeds Development, and the Urban League of Greater Pittsburgh Charter School.

== Electoral history ==
2018 Pennsylvania House of Representatives special election, District 35
Party	Candidate	Votes	%
Democratic	Austin Davis	3,209	73.69
Republican	Fawn Walker-Montgomery	1,129	25.92
Write-in		17	0.39
Total votes		4,355	100.00

2018 Pennsylvania House of Representatives election, District 35
Party	Candidate	Votes	%
Democratic	Austin Davis	15,165	96.73
Write-in		513	3.27
Total votes		15,678	100.00

2020 Pennsylvania House of Representatives election, District 35
Party	Candidate	Votes	%
Democratic	Austin Davis (incumbent)	21,327	92.52
Write-in		1,725	7.48
Total votes		23,052	100.00

2022 Pennsylvania lieutenant gubernatorial Democratic primary election
Party	Candidate	Votes	%
Democratic	Austin Davis	768,141	63.00
Democratic	Brian Sims	305,959	25.09
Democratic	Raymond L. Sosa	145,228	11.91
Total votes		1,219,328	100.00

2022 Pennsylvania House of Representatives election, District 35
Party	Candidate	Votes	%
Democratic	Austin Davis	15,241	65.90
Republican	Don Nevills	7,817	33.80
Write-in		71	0.31
Total votes		23,129	100.00

2022 Pennsylvania gubernatorial election
Party	Candidate	Votes	%
Democratic	Josh Shapiro; Austin Davis	3,031,137	56.49
Republican	Doug Mastriano; Carrie DelRosso	2,238,477	41.71
Libertarian	Matt Hackenburg; Tim McMaster	51,611	0.96
Green	Christina DiGiulio; Michael Bagdes-Canning	24,436	0.46
Keystone	Joe Soloski; Nicole Shultz	20,518	0.38
Total votes		5,366,179	100.00

== See also ==
- List of minority governors and lieutenant governors in the United States

Party political offices
Preceded by John Fetterman	Democratic nominee for Lieutenant Governor of Pennsylvania; 2022, 2026	Most recent
Political offices
Preceded by Kim Ward; Acting	Lieutenant Governor of Pennsylvania; 2023–present	Incumbent
