= McKeesport Area High School =

Coordinates: 40.343843°N 79.831315°W

- 1960 Eden Park Blvd, McKeesport, Pennsylvania

Information
- Type: Public
- Established: 1884
- School district: McKeesport Area School District
- Principal: Mark P. Holtzman
- Staff: 61.10 (FTE)
- Grades: 9–12
- Enrollment: 1,051 (2023-2024)
- Student to teacher ratio: 17.20
- Color
- Mascot: Tiger
- Website: McKeesport Area High School

McKeesport Area High School is a public high school located in McKeesport, Pennsylvania, United States. The school, which is located at 1960 Eden Park Boulevard, serves students from Dravosburg, McKeesport, South Versailles, Versailles, and White Oak. The school is a member of The Consortium for Public Education, which is a member of the Public Education Network.

== History ==
The very first building to be designated solely as a high school in McKeesport was located on Shaw Ave. In 1916, McKeesport Technical High School, also known as "Tech High" opened on 1600 Cornell St. (back then, it was just a part of the Evans Family Homestead). In 1961, the high school was relocated to its current location. The new building was adjacent to the McKeesport Vocational School located on 3600 O'Neil Boulevard. The two buildings were used jointly for a variety of high school coursework. In 2000, the 1960 Eden Park Blvd. building (also known as "South Hall") housed all 9-12 grade non-vocational classes. In 2003, additions to the physical plant enabled the vocational programs to also relocate. "North Hall" was renamed Founders' Hall and housed 7-8 grade.

When this new high school was completed in September 1961, the School Board named it McKeesport Senior High School. From 1967 until 1983, the building was known as McKeesport Area Senior High School whereupon the "senior" was dropped in 1984. From 1984 until now, it has been known as McKeesport Area High School.

The high school became a Grade 9-12 building with the start of the 1979-1980 school year. In 2003-2004, new additions to the high school building provided room for the five remaining vocational/technical classes that were previously housed at North Hall. Culinary Arts, Cosmetology, Building Construction, Auto Body, and Auto Mechanics are now all a part of the comprehensive high school that offers its entire academic and vocational/technical curriculum under one roof.

Highlights of the high school project included a modern Tiger Inn restaurant for the culinary arts program, new cosmetology labs, an expanded graphic occupations department, modern office areas for the vocational/technical program, and an expanded physical fitness area, along with, much needed, additional classroom space.

Upgrades were also made to the Weigle-Schaeffer Tiger Stadium that features a new artificial grass field, and an updated all weather track that includes specialized areas to conduct field events.

== McKeesport Area Technology Center Programs ==
- Allied Health Technology
- Auto Body and Collision
- Auto Mechanics
- Biotechnology
- Blueprint Reading
- Building Construction
- Business/Office Administration
- Child Care
- CISCO IT Essentials/C-Tech Networking
- Computer Aided Design and Drafting
- Computer Service Technology
- Cosmetology
- Culinary Arts
- Engineering Technology
- Graphics/Commercial Art
- Web Page Design

== Extracurriculars ==
The district offers a variety of clubs, activities and sports.

=== Athletics ===
McKeesport Area High School competes in the Pennsylvania Interscholastic Athletic Association (PIAA). It also is a member of the Western Pennsylvania Interscholastic Athletic League (WPIAL).

- Baseball
- Basketball
- Cheerleading
- Color Guard
- Cross Country
- Dance
- Football
- Golf
- Soccer
- Softball
- Swimming
- Tennis
- Track
- Volleyball
- Winter Guard
- Wrestling

=== Athletic championships ===
- 2005:
  - WPIAL AAAA Football Champions
  - PIAA AAAA Football Champions
- 1998:
  - WPIAL AAAA Girls Basketball Champions.
- 1995:
  - WPIAL AAAA Boys Basketball Champions.
- 1994:
  - WPIAL AAAA Football Champions.
  - PIAA AAAA Football Champions.
- 1963:
  - WPIAL Baseball Champions.
- 1955:
  - WPIAL Baseball Champions.
  - WPIAL Basketball Champions.
  - PIAA Basketball Champions.
- 1953:
  - WPIAL Baseball Champions.
- 1945:
  - WPIAL Baseball Champions.
- 1925:
  - WPIAL Basketball Champions.
  - PIAA Basketball Champions

=== Organizations and activities ===
The school's numerous and varied organizations include:

- Band
- Bowling Club
- Chess Club
- Children's Play
- Choir
- Color Guard
- Culinary Arts Club
- Cultural Diversity Club
- Cultural Heritage Club
- Environmental Club
- Equestrian team
- Foreign Language Club
- Future Business Leaders of America
- Future Nurses of America
- Gay-Straight Alliance
- Interact Club
- Marching band
- Model United Nations
- Musical theater
- National Honor Society
- Orchestra
- P.A.W.S.S.
- P.E.P.P.
- Powder Puff Football
- PTSA
- Red & Blue Newspaper
- Senior class
- Skills U.S.A.
- Speech club
- Stage crew
- Students Against Driving Drunk/Drug Awareness Committee S.A.D.D.
- Student council
- Theatre arts
- Vision Poetry Magazine
- Winter Guard
- Yearbook (Yough-A-Mon)

== Notable alumni ==
- Donald M. Carpenter – aviator in the U.S. Navy
- Swin Cash – Women's Professional Basketball Player (WNBA), 2 time (2000, 2002) NCAA Women's College Basketball Champion (UCONN), Olympic (Basketball, 2004) Gold medalist.
- Tim Conroy – former MLB pitcher
- Austin Davis – Former PA State House of Representatives Member and current Pennsylvania Lieutenant Governor
- Harry Fisher (aka Franklin J. Phillips) – United States Marine and Medal of Honor recipient
- Brian Holton – former MLB relief pitcher
- Khaleke Hudson – NFL player
- Rick Krivda – former Professional Baseball player (MLB,1991–2003), Olympic (Baseball, 2000) Gold Medalist
- Freddie Lewis – former NBA/ABA Guard (ABA All-Star)
- Mike Logan – former Pittsburgh Steelers safety
- Ray Mathews – former NFL Pro Bowl wide receiver
- Duane Michals – Artist and photographer
- George Mrkonic – former NFL player
- Mitchell Paige (1918-2005) – Colonel, United States Marine Corps, awarded Medal of Honor for actions as a Platoon Sergeant in the defense of Henderson Field on Guadalcanal Island, 26 October 1942. McKeesport HS Class of 1936
- Van Dyke Parks – musician
- Tom Qualters – former MLB pitcher
- Helen Richey – first woman pilot of a commercial airliner
- Brandon Short – former NY Giants, Carolina Panthers linebacker
- Sam Sneed – music producer
- Herbert Spiegel – psychiatrist, "father of hypnosis"
- Robert J. Stevens – chairman, president and chief executive officer of Lockheed Martin
- Russell Stuvaints – former Pittsburgh Steelers safety
- John E. McLaughlin - former CIA acting Director, Deputy Director.
