= White Oak, Pennsylvania =

Borough in Pennsylvania, US

- Borough
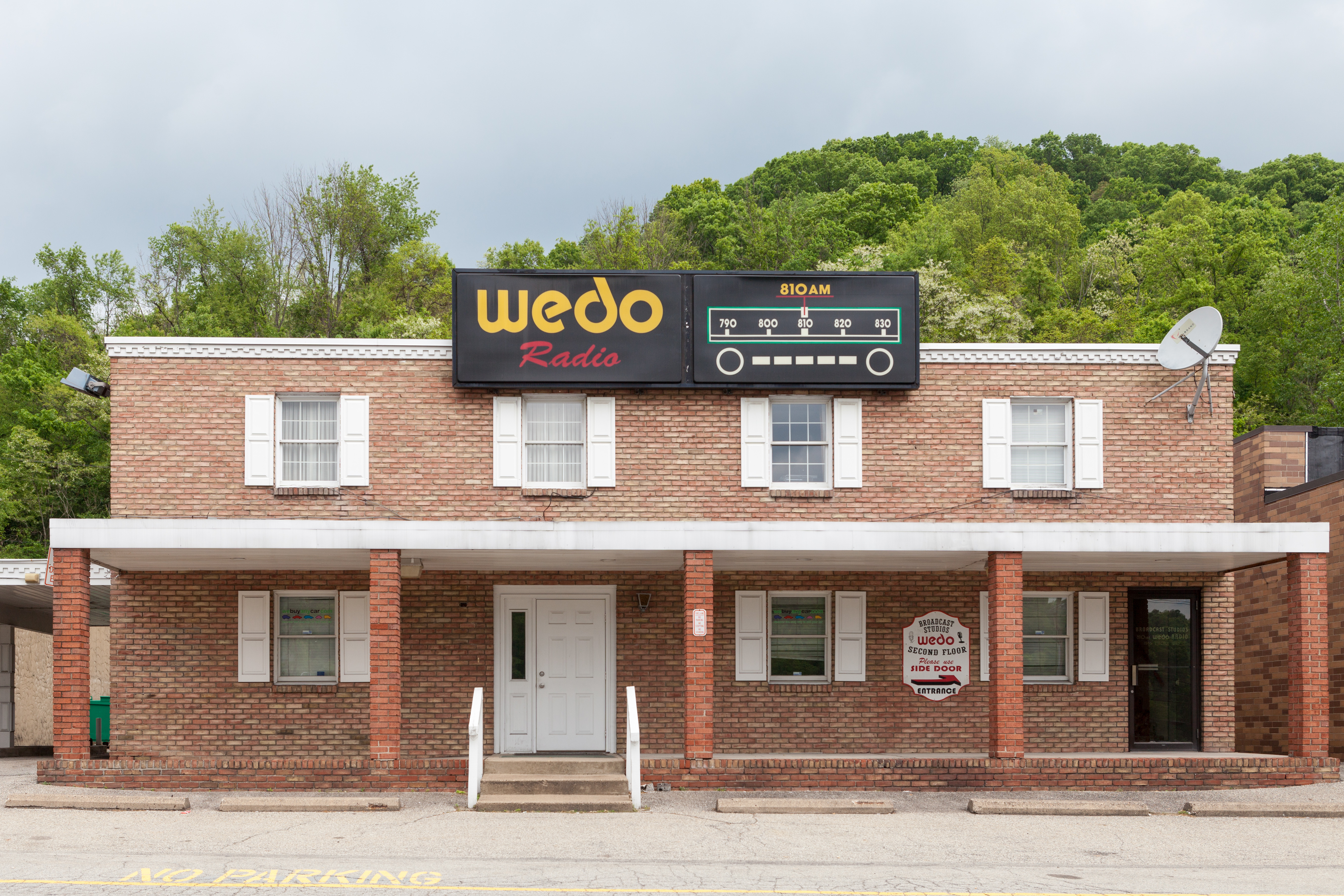
- WEDO studio in White Oak
- Motto: "Come Grow With Us"
- Location in Allegheny County and the U.S. state of Pennsylvania.
- Coordinates: 40°20′42″N 79°48′48″W
- Country: United States
- State: Pennsylvania
- County: Allegheny

Government
  - Mayor: Ina Jean Marton
  - Council President: Ron Massung
  - Council Vice President: Joe Nagy
  - Council Members: Ed Babyak; Charles Davis; Kenneth Robb; C. Richard Bryce

Area
  - Total: 6.67 sq mi (17.27 km^{2})
  - Land: 6.62 sq mi (17.15 km^{2})
  - Water: 0.046 sq mi (0.12 km^{2})

Population (2020)
  - Total: 7,630
  - Estimate (2019): 7,441
  - Density: 1,123.8/sq mi (433.89/km^{2})
- Time zone: UTC-5 (Eastern (EST))
  - Summer (DST): UTC-4 (EDT)
- ZIP codes: 15131
- Area code: 412
- FIPS code: 42-84704
- GNIS feature ID: 1196442
- Website: www.woboro.com

White Oak is a borough in Allegheny County, Pennsylvania, United States. The population was 7,630 at the 2020 census. It is a suburb of the Pittsburgh metropolitan area. White Oak was named for a stand of white oak trees near the original town site.

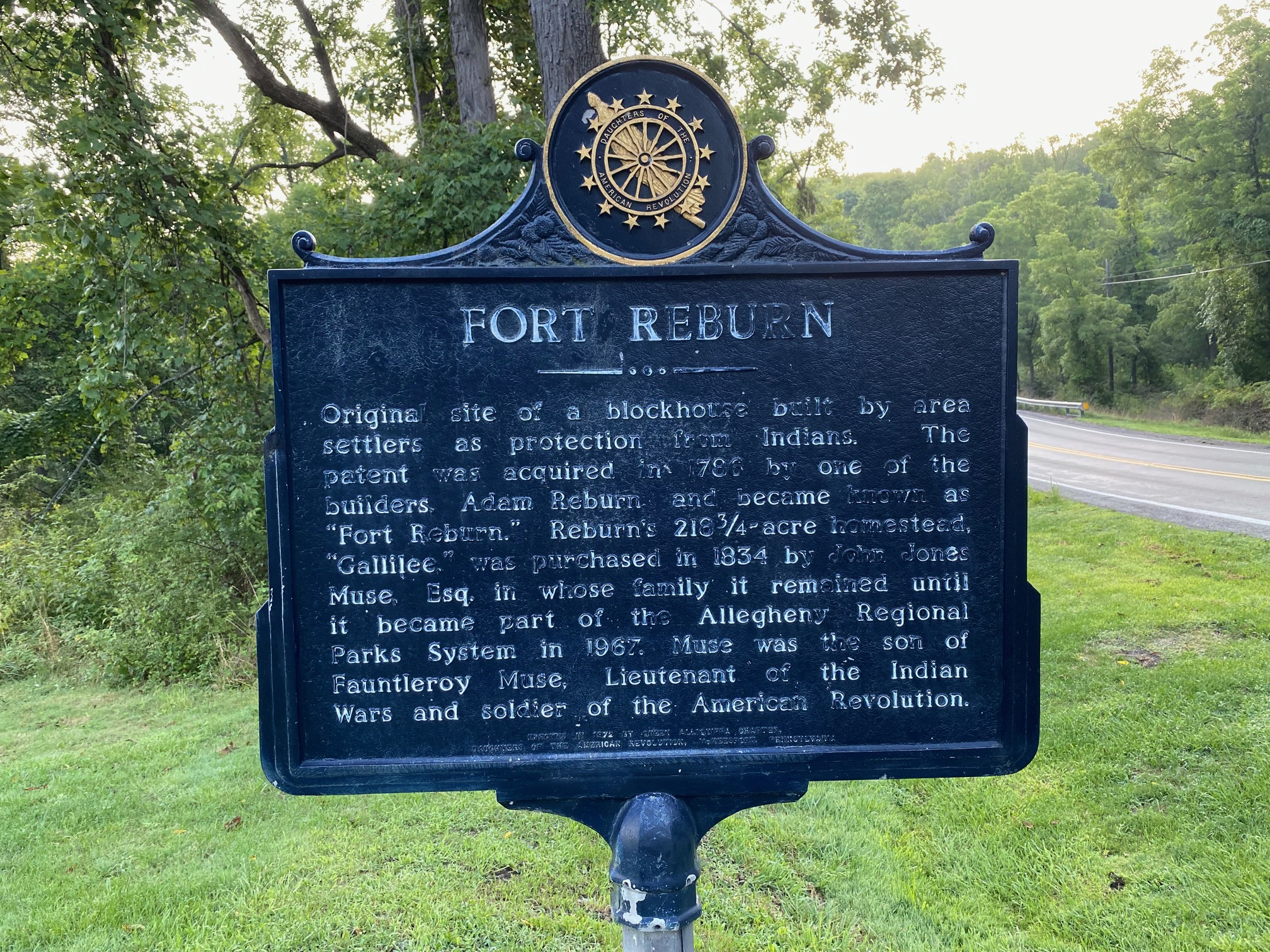
Historical marker commemorating site of fort built to protect settlers

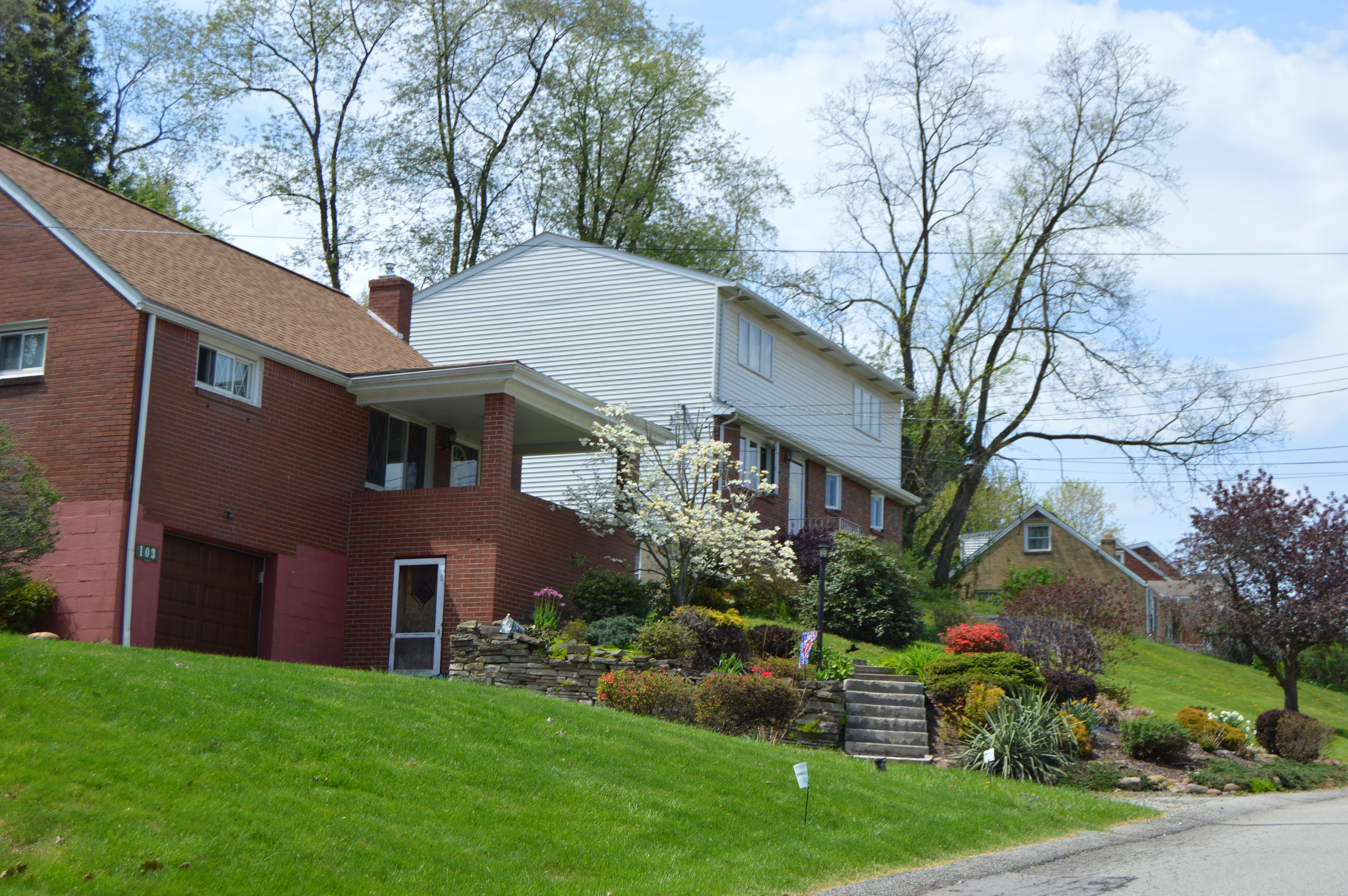
Houses on Oliver Drive

== History ==
White Oak was originally part of Versailles Township (one of the original townships of Allegheny County). In that era it was the site of Fort Reburn, a place of refuge for early settlers.

On March 21, 1948, a petition requesting the formation of White Oak Borough was submitted to the County Court. On June 24, 1948, Judge Russell H. Adams signed the decree of incorporation of the new borough. The first borough building was located at 860 Maple Street inside the old Bowery School.

== Geography ==
White Oak is located at 40°20′42″N 79°48′48″W (40.344869, −79.813202).

According to the United States Census Bureau, the borough has a total area of 6.7 square miles (17 km^{2}), of which 0.04 square miles (0.10 km^{2}) (0.45%) is water.

=== Surrounding neighborhoods ===
White Oak has five borders, including North Versailles Township to the north, North Huntingdon Township in Westmoreland County to the east, South Versailles Township to the southwest, Elizabeth Township to the south (in which a short part of the border runs across the Youghiogheny River), and McKeesport to the west.

== Demographics ==
Historical population
Census	Pop.	Note	%±
1940	5,227		—
1950	6,159		17.8%
1960	9,047		46.9%
1970	9,304		2.8%
1980	9,480		1.9%
1990	8,761		−7.6%
2000	8,437		−3.7%
2010	7,862		−6.8%
2020	7,630		−3.0%
U.S. Decennial Census

As of the 2000 census there were 8,437 people, 3,678 households, and 2,390 families residing in the borough. The population density was 1,265.4 inhabitants per square mile (488.6/km^{2}). There were 3,821 housing units at an average density of 573.1 per square mile (221.3/km^{2}). The racial makeup of the borough was 97.20% White, 1.86% African American, 0.01% Native American, 0.36% Asian, 0.01% Pacific Islander, 0.12% from other races, and 0.44% from two or more races. Hispanic or Latino of any race were 0.40% of the population.

There were 3,678 households, out of which 22.4% had children under the age of 18 living with them, 52.9% were married couples living together, 9.5% had a female householder with no husband present, and 35.0% were non-families. 31.6% of all households were made up of individuals, and 17.3% had someone living alone who was 65 years of age or older. The average household size was 2.25 and the average family size was 2.84.

In the borough the population was spread out, with 17.8% under the age of 18, 7.7% from 18 to 24, 24.5% from 25 to 44, 26.1% from 45 to 64, and 23.9% who were 65 years of age or older. The median age was 45 years. For every 100 females there were 89.8 males. For every 100 females age 18 and over, there were 87.1 males.

The median income for a household in the borough was $38,046, and the median income for a family was $47,019. Males had a median income of $37,761 versus $27,378 for females. The per capita income for the borough was $20,775. About 4.0% of families and 5.3% of the population were below the poverty line, including 8.1% of those under age 18 and 3.4% of those age 65 or over.

== Government and politics ==
Presidential election results
Year	Republican	Democratic	Third parties
2020	55% 2,651	43% 2,101	1% 52
2016	57% 2,313	42% 1,705	1% 47
2012	55% 2,255	44% 1,779	1% 52

== Education ==
- Francis McClure Middle School
- Twin Rivers Intermediate School
- Founders' Hall Middle School
- McKeesport Area High School (in McKeesport)
- Mary of Nazareth Catholic School

== Emergency services ==
The borough maintains its own police department consisting of twelve full-time officers and eight patrol cars. Two volunteer fire departments serve the borough: White Oak VFC No. 1 and Rainbow VFC. Emergency Medical Services are provided by White Oak EMS.
