= McKeesport, Pennsylvania =

City in Pennsylvania, US

- City
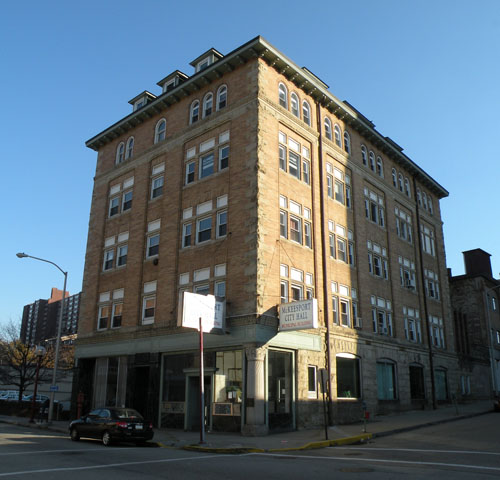
- McKeesport City Hall, built c. 1890

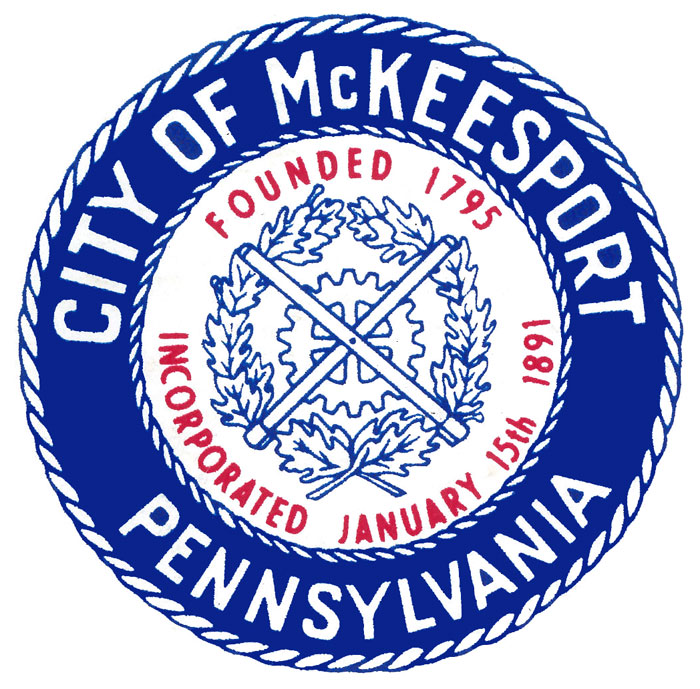
- Flag Seal
- Nickname: Tube City
- Interactive map of McKeesport, Pennsylvania
- Location within Pennsylvania Location within the United States
- Coordinates: 40°20′38″N 79°50′56″W
- Country: United States
- State: Pennsylvania
- County: Allegheny
- Settled: 1795
- Incorporated (borough): September 3, 1842
- Incorporated (city): January 15, 1891
- Founder: John McKee

Government
  - Mayor: Thomas Maglicco (D)
  - State House: Dan Goughnour (D)
  - State Senate: Nick Pisciottano (D)
  - U.S. House: Summer Lee (D)

Area
  - Total: 5.44 sq mi (14.10 km^{2})
  - Land: 5.05 sq mi (13.08 km^{2})
  - Water: 0.39 sq mi (1.02 km^{2})
- Elevation: 760 ft (230 m)

Population (2020)
  - Total: 17,727
  - Density: 3,510.7/sq mi (1,355.48/km^{2})
- Time zone: UTC-5 (EST)
  - Summer (DST): UTC-4 (EDT)
- Zip Code: 15132
- Area Code: 412
- FIPS code: 42-46256
- Waterways: Monongahela River; Youghiogheny River
- Transit: Pittsburgh Regional Transit
- Website: mckeesport-pa.gov

McKeesport is a city in Allegheny County, Pennsylvania, United States. A suburb of Pittsburgh, it is situated at the confluence of the Monongahela and Youghiogheny rivers. The population was 17,727 as of the 2020 census.

== History ==
=== Early history ===
David McKee emigrated from Scotland and was the first permanent White settler at the forks of the Monongahela and Youghiogheny Rivers, the site of present-day McKeesport, in 1755. Around the time of the French and Indian Wars, George Washington often came to McKeesport to visit his friend, Queen Alliquippa, a Seneca Indian ruler. The Colonial Government granted David McKee exclusive right of ferriage over those rivers on April 3, 1769, called "McKee's Port".

His son, John McKee, an original settler of Philadelphia, built a log cabin at this location. After taking over his father's local river ferry business, he devised a plan for a city to be called McKee's Port in 1795. John set out his proposal in the Pittsburgh Gazette, as part of a program under which new residents could purchase plots of land for $20.00. A lottery was used to distribute the plots to avoid complaints from new land owners concerning "inferior" locations.

=== 19th century ===
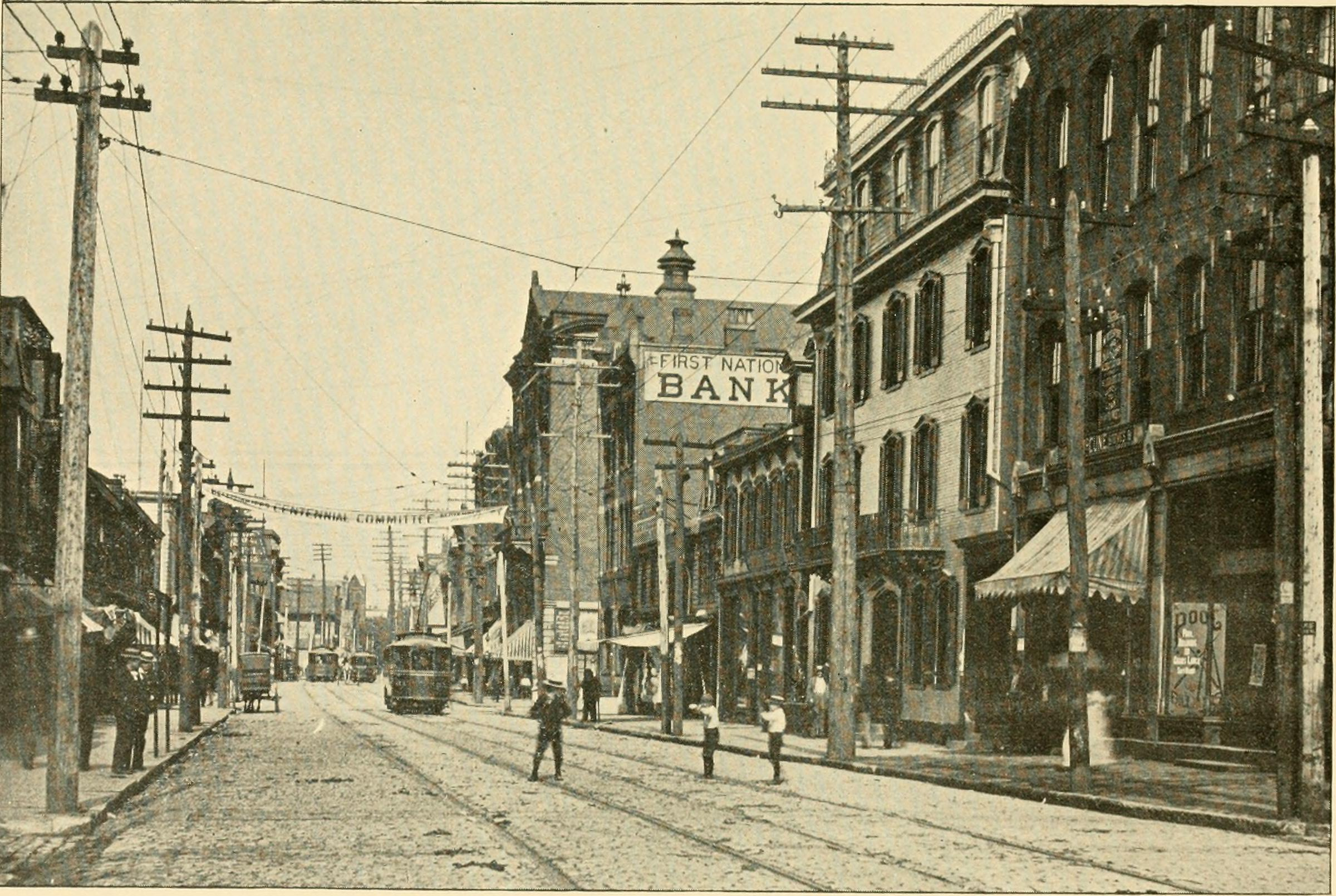
Downtown McKeesport in 1894

McKeesport, then part of Versailles Township, began to grow in 1830 when mining of the large deposits of bituminous coal in the region began. The first schoolhouse was built in 1832, with James E. Huey as its schoolmaster.

McKeesport was incorporated as a borough in 1842, and the city's first steel mill was established in 1851. The National Tube Works opened in 1872, and in the years directly following, according to the U.S. Census Bureau, McKeesport was the fastest growing municipality in the nation. Families arrived from other parts of the eastern United States, Italy, Germany, Russia, Poland, Czechoslovakia, and Hungary, with most working at the National Tube Works.

=== 20th century ===
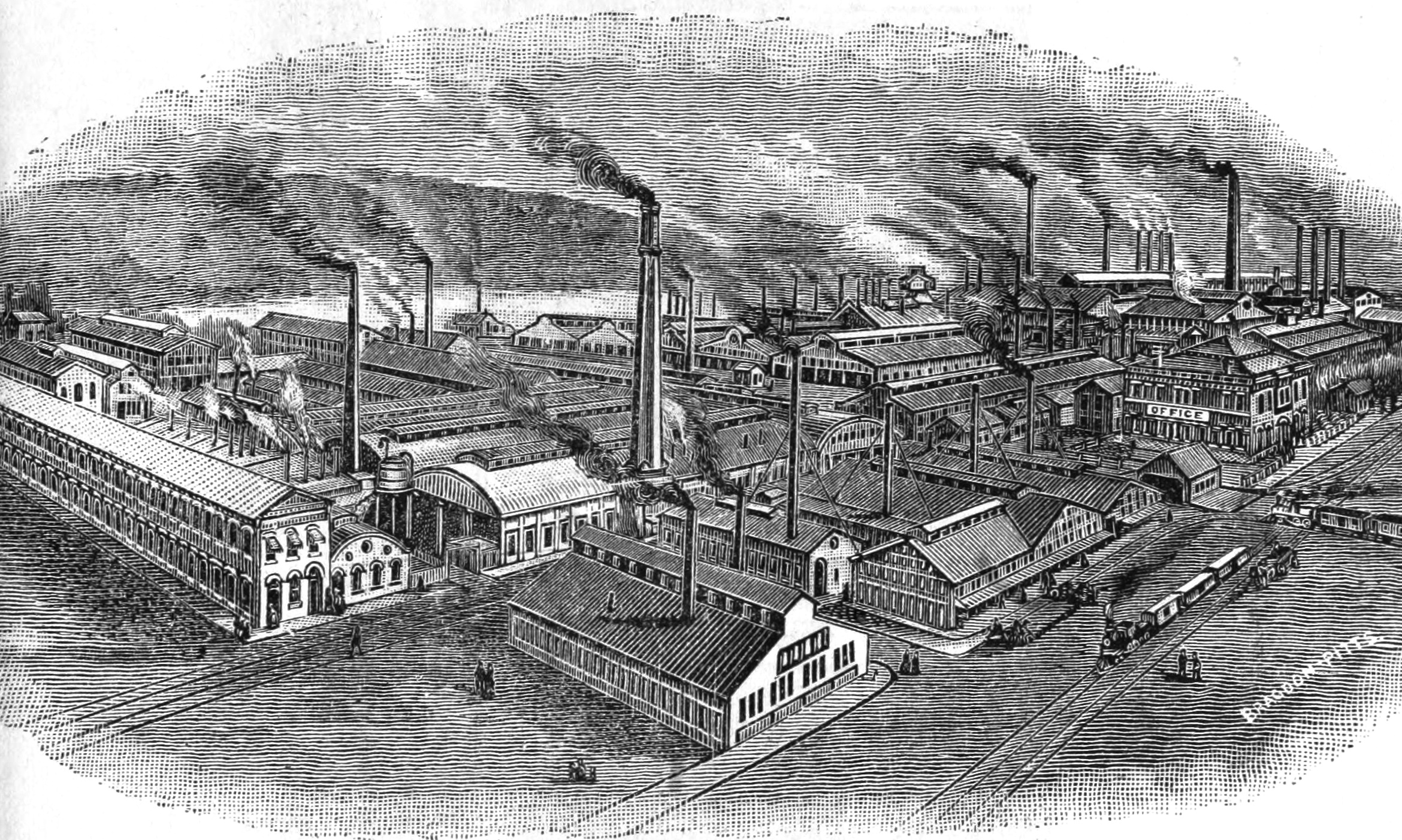
Bird's-eye view of the National Tube Works in 1888

McKeesport rose to national importance during the 1900s as a center for manufacturing steel. In 1899, the National Tube Works Company was consolidated with twenty other pipemaking firms in the northeastern United States to form the National Tube Company. In 1901, the National Tube Company and nine other major American steel companies merged to form U.S. Steel.

The city was once home to a thriving Jewish community, with four synagogues, a community centre and several Jewish-owned businesses and stores. By 1919, it had the state's second-largest Jewish population after Pittsburgh and peaked in the late 1930s, with a population of 6,850, making up 12% of the population.

The city's population continued to grow steadily, reaching a peak of 55,355 in 1940. The subsequent decline since then is attributable to the general economic malaise that descended upon the region when the steelmaking industry moved elsewhere.

On June 23, 1944, an F4 tornado struck the southern part of McKeesport, killing 17 people. Many multiple-story residences collapsed. In all, 88 homes in the city were destroyed, 306 were damaged, and 400 other buildings were damaged or destroyed.

Thirteen years before both met in some of the most notable televised Presidential debates, future presidents (and contemporary U.S. Representatives) Richard M. Nixon and John F. Kennedy met in McKeesport for their first of five debates on April 22, 1947, to debate labor issues related to the Taft-Hartley Act.

On May 21, 1976, downtown McKeesport experienced the largest fire in the city's history, referred to as the "Famous Fire", due to the fire beginning in the "Famous Department Store" on Market and Fifth Streets. The fire destroyed seven downtown structures, heavily damaged more than 12 others, and started fires in at least 10 homes due to hot embers blowing more than a half mile due to heavy gusting winds. Around 1,000 firefighters from more than 40 neighboring fire companies responded to assist, and a contingent of the Pennsylvania Army National Guard were deployed. The McKeesport Daily News reported the next day that "only shells and piles of rubble" remained "where city landmarks once stood."

National Tube closed in 1987, along with other U.S. Steel plants in the Mon Valley. The city, with the help of regional development agencies, has conducted efforts to revitalize the former mill sites.

== Geography ==
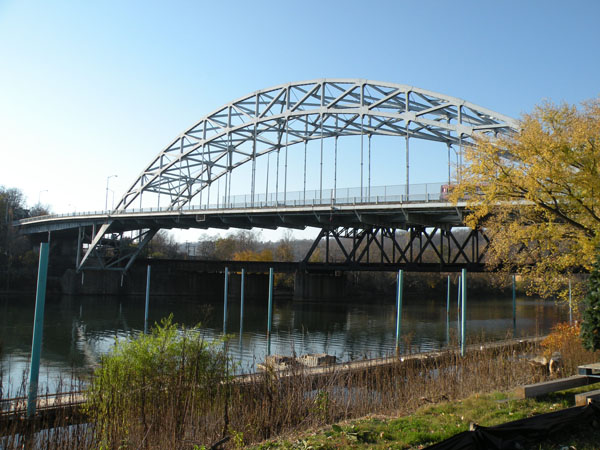
Jerome Street Bridge crossing the Youghiogheny River

McKeesport has a total area of 5.4 square miles (14 km^{2}), of which 5.0 square miles (13 km^{2}) is land and 0.4 square miles (1.0 km^{2}), or 7.06%, is water. McKeesport is located about 12 miles (19 km) upstream, and south, from Pittsburgh, at the confluence of the Monongahela and Youghiogheny rivers. The city is on the Allegheny Plateau, within the ecoregion of the Western Allegheny Plateau. The downtown area is located to the northwest, while the southern and eastern areas of the city are primarily residential.

=== Climate ===
The climate in this area is characterized by hot, humid summers and generally mild to cool winters. According to the Köppen Climate Classification system, McKeesport has a humid continental climate, abbreviated "Dfa" on climate maps.

Climate data for McKeesport, Pennsylvania
Month	Jan	Feb	Mar	Apr	May	Jun	Jul	Aug	Sep	Oct	Nov	Dec	Year
Mean daily maximum °F (°C)	39 (4)	40 (4)	51 (11)	63 (17)	71 (22)	80 (27)	84 (29)	83 (28)	76 (24)	64 (18)	53 (12)	42 (6)	62 (17)
Daily mean °F (°C)	30 (−1)	31 (−1)	40 (4)	51 (11)	59 (15)	68 (20)	73 (23)	72 (22)	65 (18)	53 (12)	43 (6)	34 (1)	52 (11)
Mean daily minimum °F (°C)	22 (−6)	22 (−6)	29 (−2)	39 (4)	47 (8)	57 (14)	61 (16)	60 (16)	53 (12)	41 (5)	33 (1)	25 (−4)	41 (5)
Average precipitation inches (mm)	2.7 (69)	2.3 (58)	3.2 (81)	3.2 (81)	3.7 (94)	3.8 (97)	3.6 (91)	3.3 (84)	3 (76)	2.3 (58)	2.5 (64)	2.6 (66)	36.1 (920)
Source: Weatherbase

=== Surrounding and adjacent communities ===
McKeesport has five land borders, including the Township of North Versailles to the north-northeast, the Borough of White Oak to the east, and Borough of Versailles to the south. The section of the city west of the Monongahela River and Youghiogheny River confluence is bordered by the Borough of Port Vue to the south and the Borough of Glassport to the southwest. The City of Duquesne is located north across the Monongahela River, connected by the McKeesport–Duquesne Bridge, as is Dravosburg and West Mifflin, connected by the W.D. Mansfield Memorial Bridge. Port Vue, the Borough of Liberty and Elizabeth Township are located across the Youghiogheny River to the west, connected by the 15th Street Bridge.

== Demographics ==
Historical population
Census	Pop.	Note	%±
1850	1,392		—
1860	2,166		55.6%
1870	2,523		16.5%
1880	8,212		225.5%
1890	20,741		152.6%
1900	34,227		65.0%
1910	42,694		24.7%
1920	46,781		9.6%
1930	54,632		16.8%
1940	55,355		1.3%
1950	51,502		−7.0%
1960	45,489		−11.7%
1970	37,977		−16.5%
1980	31,012		−18.3%
1990	26,016		−16.1%
2000	24,040		−7.6%
2010	19,731		−17.9%
2020	17,727		−10.2%

The population has fallen to less than a third of its wartime high, with the 2020 census recording fewer than eighteen thousand residents in contrast to the fifty-five thousand of 1940.

=== 2020 census ===
As of the 2020 census, McKeesport had a population of 17,727. The median age was 41.4 years, 23.0% of residents were under the age of 18, and 20.4% of residents were 65 years of age or older. For every 100 females there were 89.6 males, and for every 100 females age 18 and over there were 86.2 males.

100.0% of residents lived in urban areas, while 0.0% lived in rural areas.

There were 7,595 households in McKeesport, of which 26.6% had children under the age of 18 living in them. Of all households, 23.6% were married-couple households, 26.1% were households with a male householder and no spouse or partner present, and 41.8% were households with a female householder and no spouse or partner present. About 39.3% of all households were made up of individuals and 16.3% had someone living alone who was 65 years of age or older.

There were 8,965 housing units, of which 15.3% were vacant. The homeowner vacancy rate was 3.5% and the rental vacancy rate was 9.7%.

Racial composition as of the 2020 census
Race	Number	Percent
White	9,175	51.8%
Black or African American	6,937	39.1%
American Indian and Alaska Native	52	0.3%
Asian	49	0.3%
Native Hawaiian and Other Pacific Islander	5	0.0%
Some other race	252	1.4%
Two or more races	1,257	7.1%
Hispanic or Latino (of any race)	625	3.5%

=== 2000 census ===
As of the 2000 census, there were 24,040 people, 9,655 households, and 5,976 families residing in the city. The population density was 4,806.9 inhabitants per square mile (1,856.0/km^{2}). There were 11,124 housing units at an average density of 2,224.3 per square mile (858.8/km^{2}). The racial makeup of the city was 72.40% White, 24.46% African American, 0.27% Native American, 0.12% Asian, 0.01% Pacific Islander, 0.59% from other races, and 2.14% from two or more races. Hispanic or Latino of any race were 1.50% of the population.

There were 9,655 households, out of which 28.6% had children under the age of 18 living with them, 34.7% were married couples living together, 21.9% had a female householder with no husband present, and 38.1% were non-families. 33.9% of all households were made up of individuals, and 15.7% had someone living alone who was 65 years of age or older. The average household size was 2.35 and the average family size was 3.01.

In the city, the population was spread out, with 25.4% under 18, 7.5% from 18 to 24, 24.8% from 25 to 44, 21.3% from 45 to 64, and 20.9% who were 65 years of age or older. The median age was 40. For every 100 females, there were 84.8 males; for every 100 females age 18 and over, there were 76.8 males.

The median income for a household in the city was $23,715, and the median income for a family was $31,577. Males had a median income of $27,412 versus $21,977 for females. The per capita income for the city was $13,242. About 18.1% of families and 23.0% of the population were below the poverty line, including 35.9% of those under age 18 and 12.1% of those age 65 or over.

== Culture ==
McKeesport's population is a diverse mix of races and nationalities. As a celebration of these heritages, McKeesport hosts an annual ethnic food festival and community celebration referred to as International Village. Started in 1960, the three-day festival is one of the Pittsburgh-area's largest and oldest ethnic festivals and features traditional cuisines from Africa, China, Croatia, England, France, Germany, Greece, Hawaii, Hungary, Ireland, Italy, Lebanon, the Mediterranean, Mexico, Poland, Serbia, Slovakia, Slovenia, Sweden, and Vietnam.

=== Landmarks ===
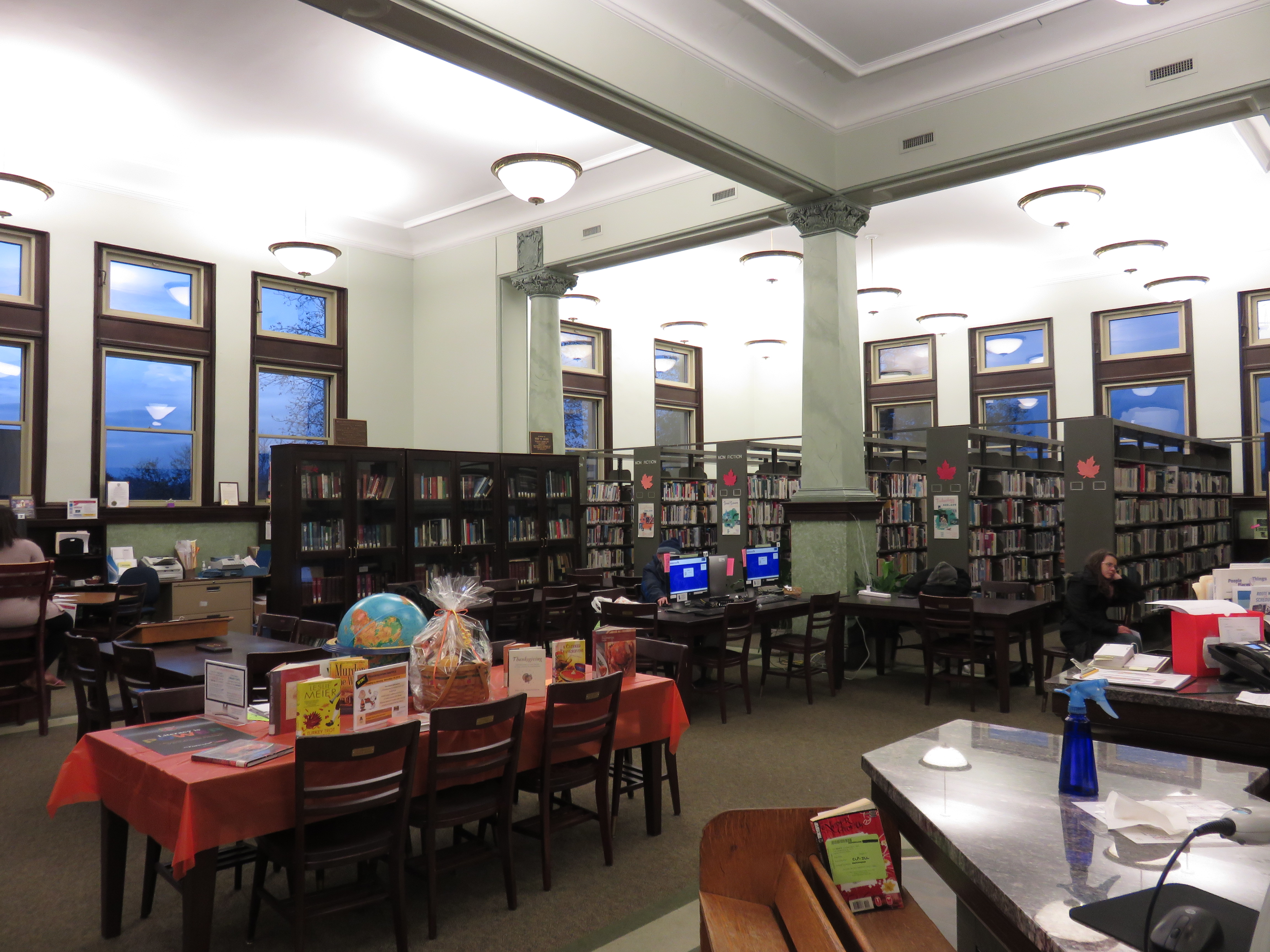
Carnegie Free Library

- Renziehausen Park Rose Garden and Arboretum
- McKeesport Regional History & Heritage Center
- Penn State University – Greater Allegheny Campus
- McKeesport Area High School
- Great Allegheny Passage Trail
- Steel Valley Trail
- Youghiogheny River Trail
- St Mary's German Church
- First Methodist Episcopal Church of McKeesport
- Carnegie Free Library
- Jerome Street Bridge
- McKeesport National Bank
- Dead Man's Hollow

== Law, government and politics ==
=== Government ===
McKeesport operates under a home rule charter based on a “Strong Mayor”/Council form of government, adopted in 1974.

Under the Home Rule Charter, the Mayor is elected at large and cannot be a member of the City Council. The Mayor serves as the leader of the City government, and is vested exclusive executive and administrative authority. Under the Home Rule Charter, the Mayor may appoint a Deputy Mayor from among the department executives.

The current mayor of McKeesport is Democrat Michael Cherepko, a former City Councilman and McKeesport Area School District teacher, He was elected in 2011, defeating Independent candidate Raymond Malinchak and was re-elected for a second and third term, commencing in January 2016 and January 2020 respectively. Michael Cherepko resigned his position in January 2026. Thomas Maglicco, city administrator, was then appointed to finish Cherepkos term. Mayors assume office in the January following election.

Mayor's Committees were first developed in their current form by Michael Cherepko and serve as advisory bodies with no formal powers. The Select Committee on Crime and Violence was formed in 2012, responsible for addressing the problems of crime and violence by utilizing resources and seeking funding for youth and adult initiatives. The McKeesport Message Committee was subsequently developed as a subgroup to promote the city's message of "Respect, Dignity, Hope, and Love" which encourages residents' pride in the city. This subgroup promotes this through community and school engagement and creative marketing. The Mayor's Committee on Community Issues was formed in 2014, responsible for providing dialogue between McKeesport residents, the Mayor's Office and other city departments.

The McKeesport City Council consists of seven individuals elected “at large” for staggered four‐ year terms. A President and Vice President is elected among themselves. The Council acts as the legislative body and is responsible for establishing policy through the adoption of ordinances, resolutions, or motions. Most government action and legislative authority in City government rests with the City Council, as well as the confirmation of certain appointments by the mayor.

Presidential Elections Results
Year	Republican	Democratic	Third Parties
2024	34% 2,375	64% 4,422	0% 79
2020	34% 2,573	64% 4,797	0.9% 73
2016	33% 2,416	65% 4,774	2% 180
2012	28% 2,093	71% 5,358	1% 54

=== Law enforcement ===
The McKeesport Police Department was one of the largest municipal law enforcement agencies in the region. It currently employs 30 sworn officers, and is one of the few departments in Allegheny County with its own detective bureau and traffic division. It operates closely with the Allegheny County Police Department, which provides investigative and forensic services for serious crimes such as homicide and the Allegheny County Sheriff's Office, which provides transport and detention services. Other agencies also provide law enforcement within the city due to overlapping jurisdictions, such as the Port Authority Police Department, McKeesport Area School District, and Penn State Greater Allegheny Police & Public Safety.

== Infrastructure ==
=== Transportation ===
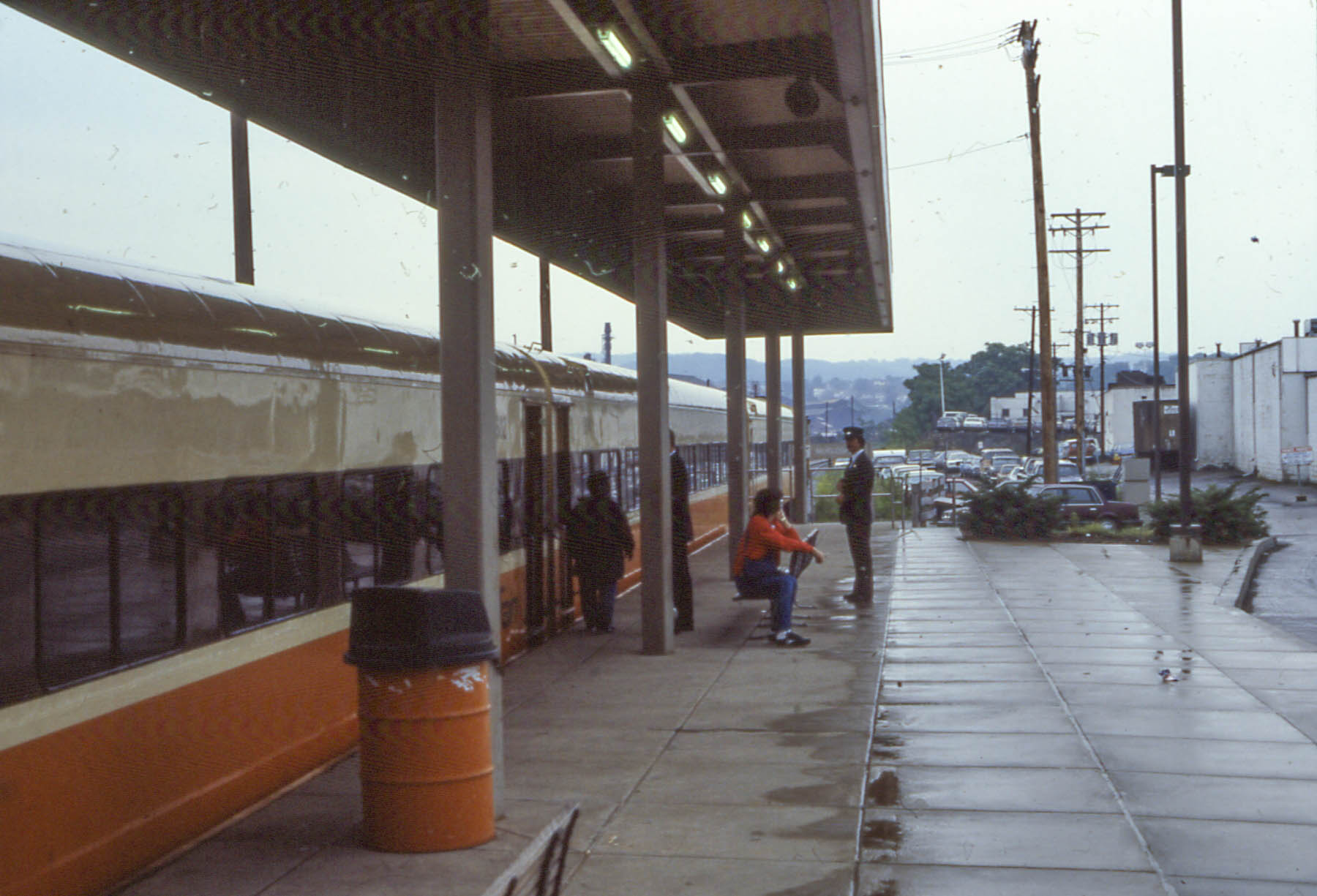
PATrain at the McKeesport Transportation Center, 1985

Pennsylvania Route 148 runs through downtown McKeesport, ending in south McKeesport at the junction of Route 48. The Yellow Belt follows Route 148 from the east, to the Jerome Street Bridge. Route 148 Truck runs exclusively within McKeesport, following Market Street three blocks to the west of the narrower mainline Route 148. McKeesport is also connected to Route 837 by the McKeesport-Duquesne Bridge, the terminus of the Green Belt, providing a direct link to Pittsburgh.

McKeesport is the beginning of the CSX Pittsburgh Subdivision, where it meets the Mon Subdivision. It is also served by the Transtar Union Railroad, which absorbed the McKeesport Connecting Railroad in 2013.

Amtrak also provided intercity rail service via the Capitol Limited between Chicago and Washington, D.C., from 1982 to 1990. The city was formerly served by the PATrain commuter service, known as the "McKeesporter", until 1989.

The city is served by the Pittsburgh Regional Transit intracity and intercity bus network, and Heritage Community Transportation. The McKeesport Transportation Center serves as the primary transit hub of the city, and underwent a $1 million redevelopment in 2017.

=== Health care ===
Founded in 1894, UPMC McKeesport offers 216 beds for acute care patients and 56 beds for patients who need skilled nursing care. Located at 1500 Fifth Ave, the hospital joined the UPMC network in April 1998. Intensive Care Unit and Cardiac Care Units recently closed, but the hospital continues to offer ongoing rehabilitation and educational programs to patients with cardiac, neurologic, and orthopaedic diagnoses. A newer, emergency room opened in December 1999.

== Notable people ==
=== Academia ===
- George Marcus, anthropologist
- Sherman Mellinkoff, second dean of the School of Medicine at the University of California, Los Angeles
- Merrill Singer, anthropologist
- Herbert Spiegel, psychiatrist, "father of hypnosis"

=== Actors and broadcasters ===
- Grover Dale, actor, dancer, choreographer, director
- Aline MacMahon, Oscar-nominated actress
- Tamara Tunie, actress, singer
- Richard Wilson, screenwriter and director

=== Business and industry ===
- Raymond J. Lane, managing partner of GreatPoint Ventures, former partner at Kleiner Perkins, former president and chief operating officer of Oracle Corporation
- Helen Richey, first woman pilot of a commercial airliner
- Robert J. Stevens, chairman, president, and chief executive officer of Lockheed Martin
- Emily E. Tassey, 19th century marine propulsion inventor with five patents

=== Military ===
- Donald M. Carpenter, aviator in the U.S. Navy
- Franklin J. Phillips, also known as Harry Fisher, United States Marine and Medal of Honor recipient

=== Musicians and artists ===
- Sheila Butler, visual artist
- Byron Janis, pianist
- Henrietta Leaver, Miss America 1935
- Duane Michals, photographer
- Sam Sneed, music producer and rapper
- Jerry Tachoir, jazz vibraphone and marimba player
- Mort Weiss, jazz clarinet player

=== Sports ===
==== Auto racing ====
- Tommy Gale, NASCAR Winston Cup driver in the 1970s and 1980s

==== Baseball ====
- Tim Conroy, former major league pitcher
- Brian Holton, former MLB relief pitcher
- Rick Krivda, MLB pitcher and 2000 Olympic gold medalist
- Tom Qualters, former MLB pitcher
- Bill Robinson, former MLB outfielder and coach
- Gary Ross, former MLB pitcher

==== Basketball ====
- Swin Cash, WNBA player, 2000 and 2012 Olympic Gold Medalist

==== Bullfighting ====
- Bette Ford, first American bullfighter to fight in the Plaza Mexico

==== Football ====
- Jim Beirne, former AFL/NFL wide receiver, Houston Oilers (1968–1973, 1976), San Diego Chargers (1974–1975)
- Ron Crosby, NFL and USFL player
- Dave Gasser, former Canadian Football League linebacker for the Edmonton Eskimos (1967–1972)
- Khaleke Hudson, NFL Linebacker, Washington Commanders (2020– )
- Branden Jackson, NFL Defensive End, Oakland Raiders (2016), Seattle Seahawks (2017– )The Raging Bull. Toms River North Mariners. 1990–1992
- Jim Kelly, former Notre Dame and NFL tight end
- Maurice Leggett, former Kansas City Chiefs cornerback
- Mike Logan, former Pittsburgh Steelers safety
- Bob Long, former NFL wide receiver, Green Bay Packers (1964–1967), Atlanta Falcons (1968), Washington Redskins (1969), Los Angeles Rams (1970)
- Bill Miller, former AFL wide receiver, Dallas Texans (1962), Buffalo Bills (1963), Oakland Raiders (1964–1968); two TD catches in Super Bowl II
- George Mrkonic, football player for the University of Kansas
- Greg Paterra, NFL player
- Brandon Short, former NFL linebacker, New York Giants (2000–2003, 2006), Carolina Panthers (2004–2005)
- Russell Stuvaints, former NFL defensive back, Pittsburgh Steelers (2003, 2004–2005, New England Patriots (2004)
- Jim Trimble, former NFL and CFL head football coach

=== Politicians and governmental leaders ===
- Queen Alliquippa, leader of the Seneca tribe of American Indians during the early part of the 18th century
- Frank Buchanan, former mayor of McKeesport and member of the United States House of Representatives, husband of Vera Buchanan
- Vera Buchanan, former member of the United States House of Representatives, wife of Frank Buchanan
- William Henry Coleman, former member of the United States House of Representatives
- Marc Gergely, Pennsylvania state representative
- John E. McLaughlin, former Deputy Director of Central Intelligence
- Emil Mrkonic, former Democratic member of the Pennsylvania House of Representatives
- Bill Shuster, member of the United States House of Representatives
- Al Benedict, Pennsylvania Auditor General from 1977 to 1985
- Austin Davis, Lieutenant Governor of Pennsylvania

=== Writers ===
- Bob Carroll, Jr., television screenwriter noted for his work on I Love Lucy
- Marc Connelly, playwright
- John Hoerr, journalist and author of And the Wolf Finally Came: The Decline of the American Steel Industry
- David Kalstone, writer and literary critic
- Robert M. McBride, writer and publisher

== In popular culture ==
McKeesport appears briefly in the Marvel comic Dark Reign: Zodiac#1.

The Netflix series Mindhunter used downtown McKeesport as 1977 Sacramento, California.

== See also ==
- List of cities in Pennsylvania
