= Mansfield Bridge =

Mansfield Bridge may refer to:

- Mansfield Covered Bridge, Parke County, Indiana, United States
- W.D. Mansfield Memorial Bridge, Allegheny County, Pennsylvania, United States
