= Alpha Jet (disambiguation) =

Alpha Jet has the following meanings:

- Dassault/Dornier Alpha Jet, an advanced trainer aircraft
- Freight trains on the Alphabet Route
- αjet, Helios Airways name after rebranding
