= Wabash Tunnel =

Tunnel in Pittsburgh, Pennsylvania, U.S.

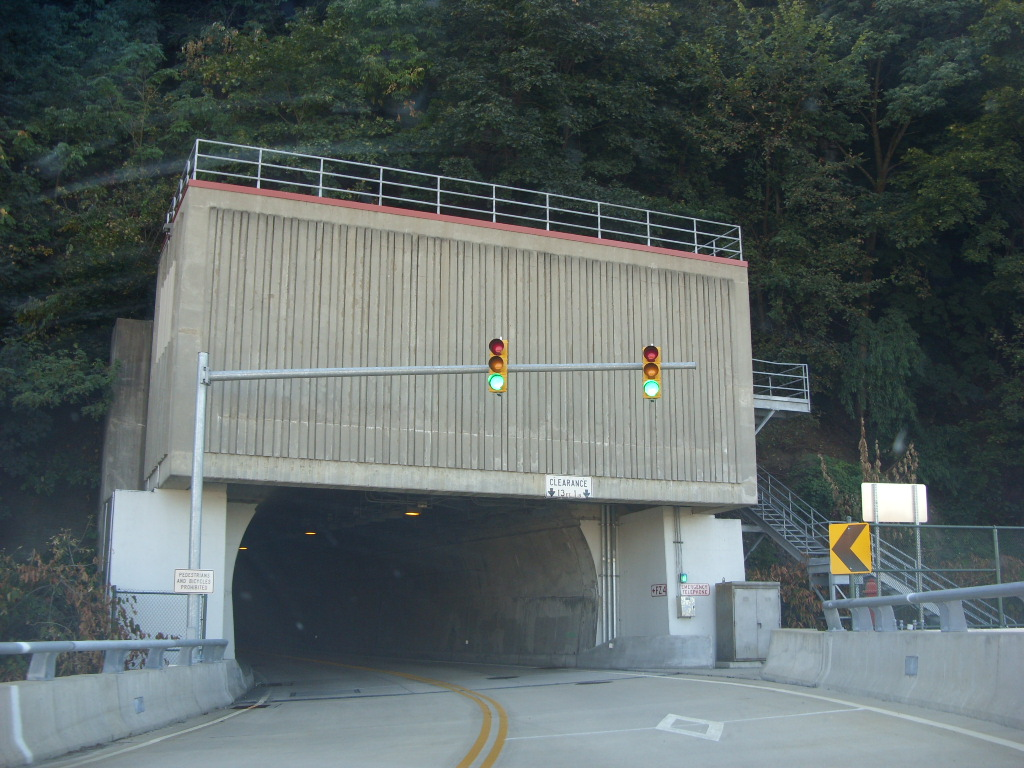
- The north end of the tunnel, which faces downtown Pittsburgh.
- Interactive map of Wabash Tunnel

Overview
- Location: Pittsburgh, Pennsylvania
- Coordinates: 40.4266°N 80.0172°W
- Status: in use
- Crosses: Mount Washington

Operation
- Work began: 1902
- Opened: 1903
- Closed: 1946
- Reopened: 2004
- Owner: Pittsburgh Regional Transit
- Traffic: railway until 1946; automobile since 2004

Technical
- Length: 3,342 feet (1,019 m)
- No. of tracks: 2 (1903–1944)
- Track gauge: 4 ft 8 1/2 in (1,435 mm) standard gauge (1903–1944)
- Operating speed: 25 mph (40 km/h)
- Tunnel clearance: 13 ft 1 in (3.99 m)

The Wabash Tunnel is a former railway tunnel and presently an automobile tunnel through Mount Washington in the city of Pittsburgh, Pennsylvania, United States. Constructed early in the 20th century by railroad magnate George J. Gould for the Wabash Railroad, it was closed to trains and cars between 1946 and 2004.

== Operation as a railroad tunnel ==
Conceived in the late 1800s, the tunnel was built in 1903 for Gould's Wabash Pittsburgh Terminal Railway venture into Pittsburgh, which failed financially in 1908. It carried passenger trains into the city until 1931, and freight trains until 1946. After the end of train service, the tunnel sat empty for many years. The tunnel was once connected to the Wabash Bridge across the Monongahela River, but the bridge was demolished in 1948 and was not replaced. Its two stone support piers remain in the river.

== Conversion to a transitway ==
In the early 1970s Pittsburgh Regional Transit (PRT), then known as the Port Authority of Allegheny County (PAT), spent US$6 million (equivalent to $47.7 million in 2025) rebuilding the tunnel for the never-to-be-operational Skybus, a proposed people mover system. The project was also to include a new bridge over the Monongahela River.

== Use as a bus garage ==
During this period, the tunnel was used to hold up to 87 of PAT's disused 1950s-era transit buses in reserve. The tunnel portals were reinforced to deter vandals, to the satisfaction of PAT's insurers. Despite this, in 1980, vandals gained access and smashed hundreds of windows and headlights on the two rows of buses parked inside.

== Conversion to a roadway ==
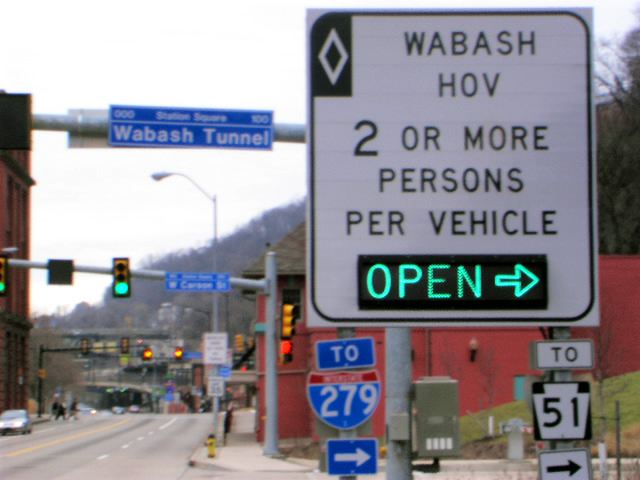
Carson Street ramp

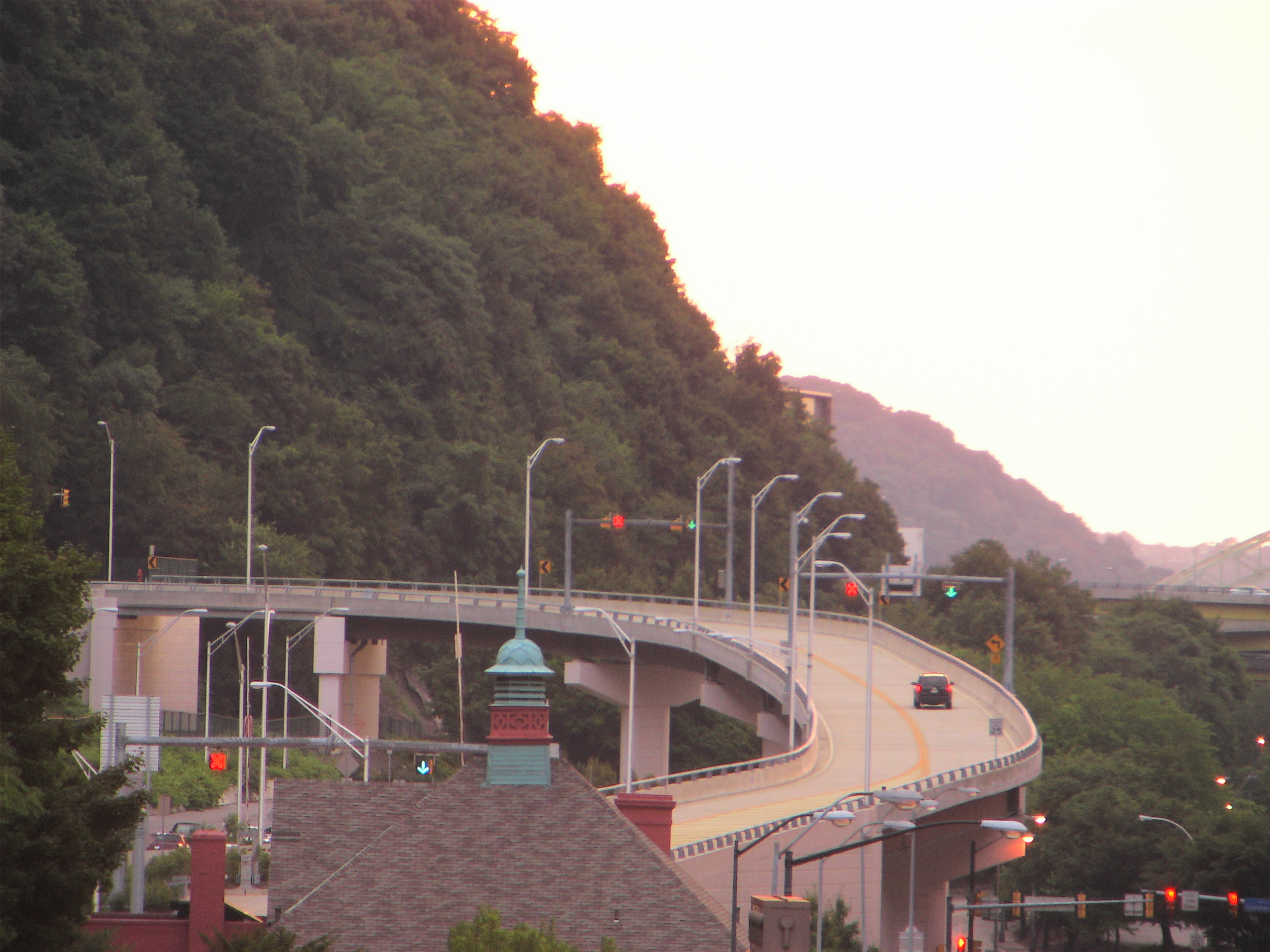
Automobile on ramp leading into tunnel

By 1992, the Pennsylvania Department of Transportation (PennDOT) was considering using the Wabash Tunnel as a roadway to compensate for an upcoming closure of the Fort Pitt Tunnel. As part of the conversion to a roadway, the guideways for the Skybus system were removed and replaced with new paving and drainage. When awarded in 1994, the contract for this work was worth $3.2 million ($7 million in 2025). However, in 1995, PAT declined to build a new road bridge (estimated at $25.8 million, or $54.5 million in 2025) to connect the tunnel with downtown Pittsburgh.

On July 23, 2003, PAT approved contracts for $10.9 million ($19.1 million in 2025) to build high-occupancy vehicle (HOV) ramps, modernize the tunnel, and provide a 172-space park-and-ride lot along Woodruff Street. The HOV lane was opened on December 27, 2004, running from West Carson Street on the South Side and through the tunnel to Woodruff Street in Mount Washington. The Fort Pitt Tunnel to the west and the Liberty Tunnels to the east carry nearly all of the vehicular traffic heading downtown.

On November 6, 2013, the Federal Transit Administration lifted the HOV requirements to provide an alternate route for drivers, due to the two-year closure of outbound West Carson Street. On February 24, 2017, PAT announced that the HOV restrictions had been waived permanently.

As of October 2025, PRT planned to close the tunnel to traffic unless it could find another agency that wanted to operate it, citing high operating expenses and low use (2,000 vehicles a day). Not finding any agencies, PRT voted on October 23, 2026, to close the tunnel on December 1 of that year.

== Operators ==
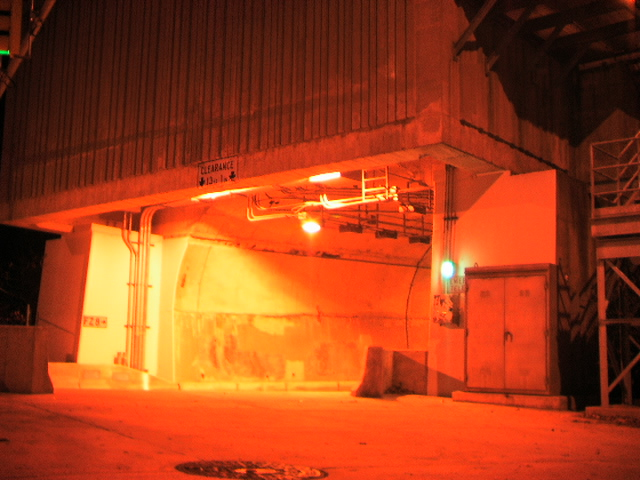
December 2006 nighttime photo of the north end of the tunnel.

Originally built for the Wabash Railroad, the Pittsburgh and West Virginia Railroad acquired it along with most of the ex-Wabash-Railroad property in 1917.

The tunnel was sold in 1931 to Allegheny County for $3 million ($63.5 million in 2025). The county intended to convert it to a road and use it to relieve the traffic congestion in the Liberty Tunnels, and in 1933 commissioned a $5000 study to investigate this concept.

As of April 2006, the tunnel was operated and maintained for PAT by Bruce & Merrilees at an annual cost of $780,000.

== Incidents ==
The tunnel's north portal was severely damaged in a 1925 landslide. The tunnel was temporarily closed due to fallen trees on July 19, 2012.

== See also ==
- Wabash Bridge
- Wabash Pittsburgh Terminal – A large railroad terminal that was located in downtown, across the river from the tunnel portal.
- West Busway – the project under which the tunnel was reopened for automobile traffic
