= McKeesport Ambulance Rescue Service =

The McKeesport Ambulance Rescue Service, formally the McKeesport Ambulance Authority, is a non-profit emergency medical services agency which provides emergency medical and patient transport services to the City of McKeesport, Pennsylvania and a number of surrounding municipalities. It was established in 1991, and is assigned station number 620 by Allegheny County Emergency Services.

== Contact Information ==
P.O. Box 580, McKeesport, PA 15134

1604 Evans Avenue, McKeesport, PA 15132 Phone: (412) 675-5076 Fax: (412) 675-5072

1204 Washington Boulevard, McKeesport, PA 15133

== Organization & Staff ==
The agency executive is William Miller, who holds the titles of Executive Director and Chief. Regular daily staffing calls for 3 Advanced Life Support Ambulances 24/7. In house billing and office duties are handled by an office manager. MARS staffing currently includes 1 Chief, 2 Lieutenants, 1 Billing Manager and approximately 13 full time and 15 part time/casual Paramedics and Emergency Medical Technicians as well as full time 2 Wheelchair Van Drivers. Each shift has a designated Crew Chief responsible for handling day-to-day operations. MARS does not currently utilize Emergency Medical Responder, Emergency Medical Technician Advanced, or Prehospital Registered Nurse certified personnel. EMS crews are scheduled 24 hour shifts.

== Services ==
McKeesport Ambulance Rescue Service provides 911 dispatched emergency medical care and non-emergency transport services as well as wheelchair van transports, under contract, to the following municipalities;

- City of McKeesport
- City of Duquesne
- Borough of Dravosburg>
- Borough of Glassport
- Borough of Port Vue

MARS also provides mutual aid to neighboring municipalities of Versailles Borough, White Oak, North Versailles, Munhall, Rankin, Clairton, Elizabeth Township, City of Pittsburgh. MARS is part of the Allegheny County Mass Casualty Response plan. MARS also provides coverage to mass-gathering events such as football standbys and International Village, as well as CPR, Stop The Bleed education and community influenza vaccinations. MARS also provides ground transport services from a landing zone in McKeesport to McKeesport Hospital and back to the landing zone to STAT MedEvac.

Rescue services are provided by the fire departments in each community.

== Facilities & apparatus ==
The agency operates a fleet of five Ford/Chevy ambulances two type 2 ambulances and three type 3 ambulances, one squad a Ford Explorer, and two Ford wheelchair vans from its headquarters facility on Evans Avenue in McKeesport, and a sub-station on Washington Avenue in Port Vue which is owned by the borough. During daylight hours one ambulance is staffed at the Glassport Fire Station on Allegheny Avenue. Past apparatus included a Jeep Cherokee, a light duty rescue which was used for rehab, MCIs, and Quick Response, and assorted Ford/Chevy type 1, 2, and 3 ambulances.

== Communications ==
McKeesport Ambulance Rescue Service is dispatched by the Allegheny County Emergency Services located in Moon Township on the East EMS frequency.MARS crews utilize Minitor 5 alerting devices at the Evans Avenue and Port Vue stations. A base radio is located at the main station on Evans. Mobile radios are in all response vehicles and all on duty crew members carry Kenwood portable radios. Crew members also utilize Active911 on their cell phones to receive calls. Some of the ambulances are equipped with Computer Aided Dispatch computers which will display information about the call. Communications for medical command are done via phone or on radio at 155.340Mhz.

== Training ==
MARS personnel requiring continuing education to maintain their certification utilize the Train PA website to complete online courses. Courses are also offered in house at local hospitals and other fire/EMS departments in the region. There is currently no in-house training offered.

== Equipment ==
Equipment utilized on each ambulance includes a Lifepack 15 monitor, Portable Suction Unit, Oxygen Bag, Medical Bag, Drug Box, Pet Oxygen Masks, Personal Flotation Devices, Body Armor, Stryker/Ferno Stretchers, Stryker/Ferno stairchairs with tracks, Region 13 MCI bag with SMART triage system, and Helmets along with other miscellaneous medical supplies and equipment meeting the PA Department of Health requirements for ALS ambulances. In 2019 MARS added a Lucas mechanical CPR device to its inventory.

== Billing ==
Billing is handled in house by the department billing manager and Ambulance Billing Solutions in McKeesport.

== Mutual aid ==
Several agencies can be dispatched to assist MARS with calls or in place of MARS in the event that all units are already on other calls. Primary mutual aid services include Southeast Regional, Baldwin, Munhall, and White Oak. The UPMC Prehospital Response Unit is automatically dispatched on all E-0 calls (Life threatening).

== See also ==
- McKeesport Fire Department
- McKeesport Police Department
