= Wabash Bridge (Pittsburgh) =

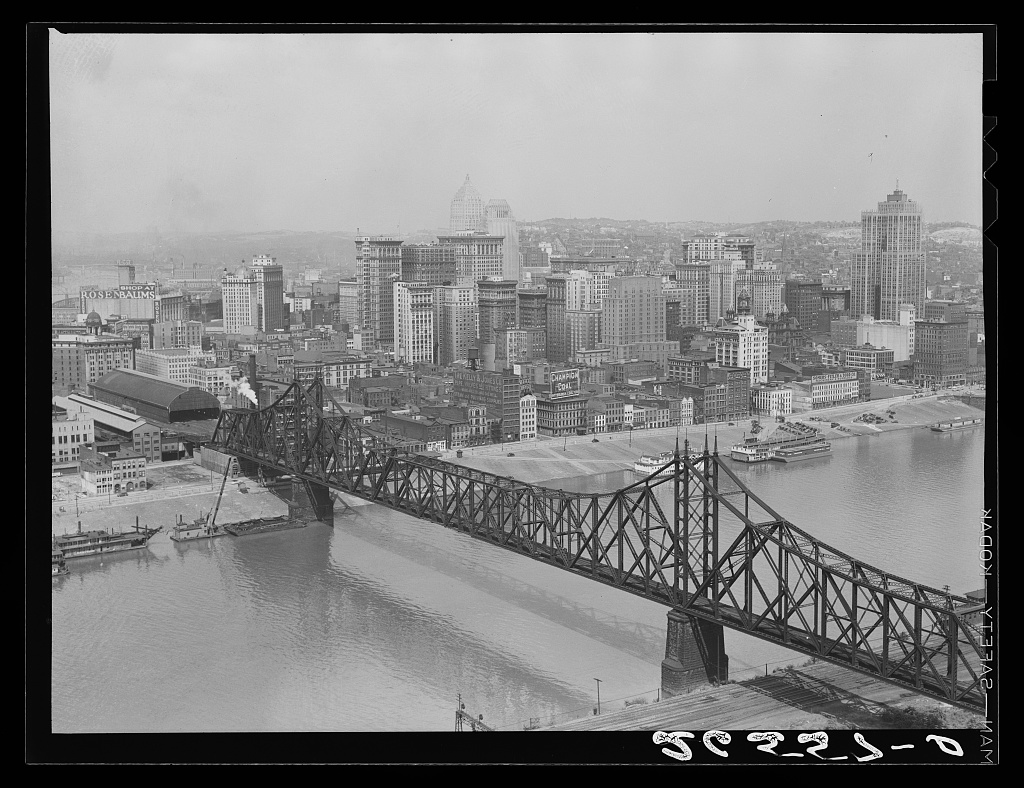
- Wabash Bridge 1938
- Coordinates: 40°26′13.51″N 80°0′26.49″W
- Crosses: Monongahela River
- Locale: Pittsburgh, Pennsylvania

Characteristics
- Design: cantilever through truss (removed) piers: rusticated stone
- Material: Steel
- Total length: 1,504 feet (458 m)
- Longest span: 812 feet (247 m)
- Piers in water: 2
- Clearance above: 46 feet (14 m)

History
- Opened: 1904
- Closed: 1946 (closed to traffic); 1948 (removed)

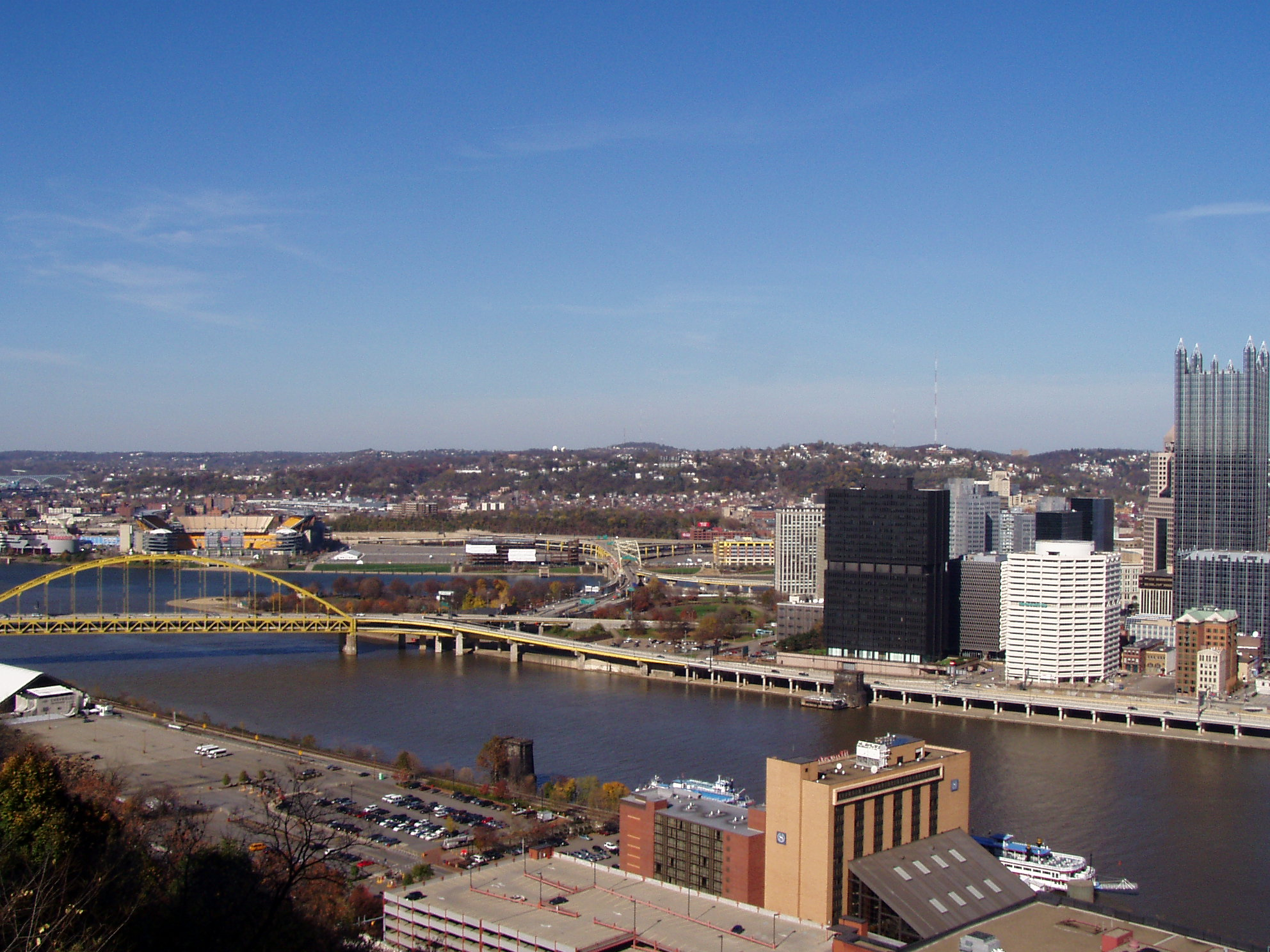
A view of the Wabash Bridge piers, 2004.

The Wabash Bridge was a railroad bridge across the Monongahela River at Pittsburgh. It was constructed between 1902 and 1904 by railroad magnate George J. Gould for his Wabash Pittsburgh Terminal Railway.

The Wabash Bridge carried rail traffic from the elaborate Wabash Terminal in downtown Pittsburgh to the Wabash Tunnel through Mt. Washington. The rail cars were from the Wabash-Pittsburg Terminal Railroad, an ill-fated venture by George Jay Gould to compete with the Pennsylvania Railroad in Pittsburgh.

After less than half a century, the Wabash was considered a “hard luck” bridge, haunted by its history, and an eyesore. In 1946, a fire destroyed the terminal. The bridge had become a useless hulk, and was dismantled two years later. Some of its steel was melted down for use in the Dravosburg Bridge, which was being built in 1948.

== History ==
Construction of the bridge began in 1902. The two ends of the bridge were begun from opposite banks before being joined in the middle. On October 19, 1903, during the efforts to merge the two ends of the bridge, the center of the bridge collapsed. The accident resulted in the deaths of 10 workers. Additional problems plagued the bridge's construction site including a smallpox epidemic, bad weather, and strikes. The bridge was completed in 1904. However, the Wabash railway line was not profitable and collapsed into receivership in 1908. In 1917, the railway was absorbed into the Pittsburgh and West Virginia Railway which continued running trains over the Wabash bridge. After 1931, the bridge was only used for freight traffic which ran through the downtown terminal. When the terminal and warehouses were destroyed by fire in 1946, the bridge became functionally obsolete. The bridge was demolished in 1948 after years of neglect. The steel from the bridge was used in the construction of the Dravosburg Bridge in 1948.

Two piers remain in place today, the only remnants of the bridge still in place at the original site.

The Wabash Tunnel, which carried the railroad through the hills south of the Monongahela River, sat abandoned for more than 50 years before reopening to one-way auto traffic in 2004.

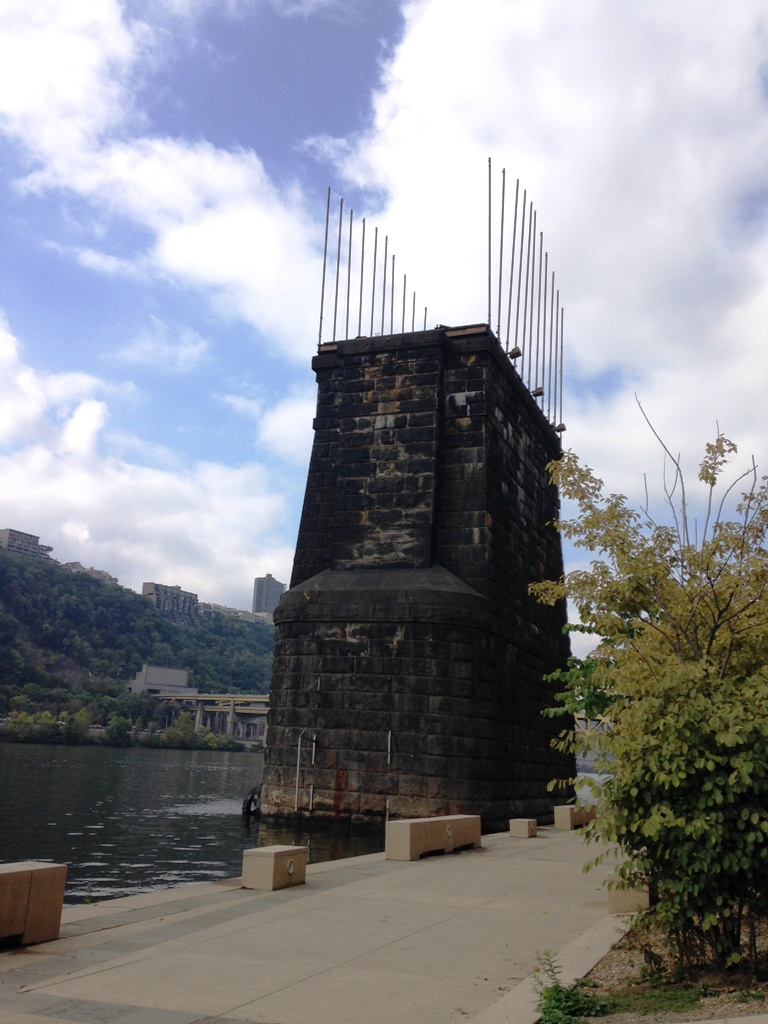
One of the two remaining piers from the Wabash Bridge that took rail traffic across the Monongahela River in Pittsburgh, from 1904 to 1946.

== Popular culture ==
In the 2008 video game Fallout 3 DLC The Pitt, the Wabash Bridge was reconstructed around the year 2077 in the style of the Tenth Street Bridge.

== See also ==
- Wabash Tunnel
- Wabash Pittsburgh Terminal
