= Pittsburgh and West Virginia Railway =

Company and former railroad in the United States

- The P&WV formed a connection between the Wheeling and Lake Erie Railway and Western Maryland Railway.

Overview
- Headquarters: Greentree, PA
- Reporting mark: PWV
- Locale: Connellsville, Pennsylvania to Pittsburgh Junction, Ohio
- Dates of operation: July 2, 1904–October 16, 1964

Technical
- Track gauge: 4 ft 8 1/2 in (1,435 mm) standard gauge

The Pittsburgh and West Virginia Railway (reporting mark PWV) was a railroad in the Pittsburgh, Pennsylvania, and Wheeling, West Virginia, areas. Originally built as the Wabash Pittsburgh Terminal Railway, a Pittsburgh extension of George J. Gould's Wabash Railroad, the venture entered receivership in 1908, and the line was cut loose. An extension completed in 1931 connected it to the Western Maryland Railway at Connellsville, Pennsylvania, forming part of the Alphabet Route, a coalition of independent lines between the Northeastern United States and the Midwest. It was leased by the Norfolk and Western Railway in 1964 in conjunction with the N&W acquiring several other sections of the former Alphabet Route but was leased to the new spinoff Wheeling and Lake Erie Railway in 1990, just months before the N&W was merged into the Norfolk Southern Railway.

The original Wabash Pittsburgh Terminal Railway built several massive engineering works, including the Wabash Terminal in downtown Pittsburgh, damaged by two fires in 1946 and demolished in 1953. The Wabash Bridge over the Monongahela River into Pittsburgh was torn down in 1948. On December 27, 2004, the Wabash Tunnel just southwest of the bridge opened as a high occupancy vehicle roadway through Mount Washington. As of May 2024 the two piers of the long-gone Wabash Bridge remain standing.

The line included a branch to West End, Pennsylvania, abandoned in 2011, and a branch to West Mifflin, Pennsylvania, known as the Mifflin Branch. It also had a small industrial branch located near Belle Vernon, Pennsylvania.

At the end of 1960, P&WV operated 223 mi (359 km) of track, on 132 mi (212 km) of road; that year it reported 439 million net ton-miles of revenue freight.

== History ==
=== Gould system: 1901 to 1908 ===
Around 1900, George J. Gould was assembling railroads to create a transcontinental system. The Western Pacific Railway, Denver and Rio Grande Railroad and Missouri Pacific Railroad formed the line from the Pacific Ocean at San Francisco to the Mississippi River at St. Louis (completed in 1909). Past St. Louis, Gould acquired the Wabash Railroad to Toledo.

On February 1, 1901, Gould, along with Joseph Ramsey, Jr., of the Wabash and others, formed the Pittsburgh-Toledo Syndicate, a syndicate intending to extend the system to Pittsburgh. The next month, the syndicate bought the Pittsburgh and Mansfield Railroad, an unbuilt line with a charter to build into downtown Pittsburgh. By May 1 the syndicate gained control of the Wheeling and Lake Erie Railroad, extending the system from Toledo southeast to Zanesville, Ohio, and Wheeling, West Virginia.

The extension to Pittsburgh was chartered in three parts—the Cross Creek Railroad April 23, 1900, in Ohio, Pittsburgh, Toledo and Western Railroad April 3, 1901, in West Virginia, and Pittsburgh, Carnegie and Western Railroad July 17, 1901, in Pennsylvania. Work on the line, branching off the P&WV's line to Wheeling at Pittsburgh Junction, Ohio, began June 14, 1901. On May 7, 1904, the three companies were consolidated into the Wabash Pittsburgh Terminal Railway, to which all the syndicate properties (including the W&LE) were transferred. The first train passed through the Wabash Tunnel. It crossed the Wabash Bridge over the Monongahela River into Pittsburgh on June 1, and passenger service into the new Wabash Terminal began July 2, with through service over the W&LE and Wabash to Toledo, Chicago, St. Louis, and Kansas City.

In addition to the Pittsburgh extension, Gould planned a line from Zanesville southeast to Belington, West Virginia, which was built by the Little Kanawha Syndicate. From Belington east to tidewater in Baltimore, the Fuller Syndicate bought the West Virginia Central and Pittsburg Railway and a controlling interest in the Western Maryland Railroad in 1902. Another part of the plan was the Philadelphia and Western Railway, a high-speed third rail electric interurban line, which would have run from Philadelphia west to the Western Maryland at York, Pennsylvania. The lines of the Fuller Syndicate were completed in Baltimore, but the Little Kanawha line was not completed, and a connection between the main system and the Fuller Syndicate was not built.

As Gould's plans affected the Pennsylvania Railroad's business, PRR took measures to fight back. This included evicting telegraph poles owned by Gould's Western Union from PRR property.

The Panic of 1907 hit Gould hard due to the high costs of building the line when all the easy routes had been taken. The Western Maryland Railroad was the first of his properties to fail, entering receivership on March 5, 1908. The Wabash Pittsburgh Terminal Railway entered receivership on May 29 of that year, ending through traffic between Pittsburgh and the W&LE and Wabash systems.

=== Independence: 1908 to 1929 ===
After years of operation by its receivers, the company was finally sold at foreclosure in August 1916 and reorganized November as the Pittsburgh and West Virginia Railway. The line was again being considered for part of a major system—the "Fifth System" to supplement the four major players, the Pennsylvania Railroad, New York Central Railroad, Baltimore and Ohio Railroad and Erie Railroad—but there was still the issue of the gap between the W&LE/P&WV and the Western Maryland, never filled by the Little Kanawha Syndicate.

The existing West Side Belt Railroad provided for the beginning of this extension, crossing the P&WV at the southwest portal of the Wabash Tunnel under Mount Washington and running southeast and east to Clairton on the Monongahela River. After an initial denial, the Interstate Commerce Commission approved the P&WV's plan to acquire the West Side Belt in December 1928.

=== Pennsylvania Railroad influence: 1929 to 1964 ===
In 1929, the Pennsylvania Railroad incorporated the Pennroad Corporation as an investment and holding company. This allowed the PRR to indirectly invest in other transportation companies without ICC regulation. Among the initial purchases, 72% of the P&WV was acquired.

On February 11, 1931, the extension to Connellsville, Pennsylvania, opened, where the Western Maryland continued east, splitting from the West Side Belt at Pierce. This formed what came to be known as the Alphabet Route, following roughly the same plan as Gould's system but using the Nickel Plate Road rather than the Wabash to reach both St. Louis and Chicago. The P&WV and Western Maryland never physically connected in Connellsville—a short section of Pittsburgh and Lake Erie Railroad trackage was used to connect the P&WV to the WM.

The Nickel Plate leased the Wheeling and Lake Erie on December 1, 1949. In March 1950, the Pennroad announced plans to lease the P&WV to the Nickel Plate. In 1962, the Norfolk & Western Railway filed to include the P&WV in the upcoming merger of the Nickel Plate. On October 16, 1964, the Norfolk and Western acquired the Nickel Plate. They leased the P&WV. On the other hand, the Western Maryland Railway eventually went to the competing Baltimore and Ohio Railroad and Chesapeake and Ohio Railway in 1967. Following the abandonment of the Western Maryland Railway mainline from Connellsville to Cumberland, Maryland, in 1975, a connection was established between the P&WV and the B&O at a location near Connellsville called Sodom, and the P&WV's connection to the P&LE and WM was abandoned at this same time. This enabled a semblance of the old Alphabet Route to continue under the Chessie System, although on B&O lines east from Connellsville instead of WM lines.

=== Norfolk and Western: 1964 to 1990 ===
The Pittsburgh and West Virginia Railroad was organized in 1967 as a real estate investment trust to own the property leased to the N&W. The railroad is now a subsidiary of Power REIT, a real estate investment trust that is publicly traded on the NYSE under the symbol "PW". The leased properties consist of a railroad line 112 miles in length, extending from Connellsville, Washington, and Allegheny counties in the Commonwealth of Pennsylvania, Brooke County in West Virginia, and Jefferson and Harrison counties in Ohio. There are also branch lines total 20 miles in length located in Washington County, Allegheny County in Pennsylvania, and Brooke County, West Virginia. The railroad was leased in 1964 to NSC, formerly Norfolk and Western Railway Company, by the company’s predecessor for 99 years with the right of unlimited renewal for an additional 99-year period under the same terms and conditions, including annual rent payments.

The lease provides that NSC, at its own expense and without deduction from the rent, will maintain, manage, and operate the leased property and make such improvements thereto as it considers desirable. Such improvements made by NSC become the property of the Pittsburgh & West Virginia Railroad, and the cost thereof constitutes a recorded indebtedness of the company to NSC.

The company’s business consists solely of owning the properties subject to the lease and collecting rent thereon. Upon termination of the lease, all properties covered by the lease would be returned to Pittsburgh & West Virginia Railroad, together with sufficient cash and other assets to permit the railroad's operation for one year.

=== Wheeling and Lake Erie: 1990 to present ===
On May 17, 1990, Norfolk Southern spun off most of the former W&LE as a new Wheeling and Lake Erie Railway. The P&WV lease was transferred to the new W&LE, which has also acquired trackage rights over CSX Transportation lines from Connellsville East to Hagerstown, Maryland.

Power REIT continues to own the P&WV, but effective 2026, investors Henry Posner III and Bradley & Daytona Railway and Land Co. LLC managed by Alexander Kachmar have initiated large stakes in Power REIT with indications of potential interest in the P&WV Railway. On May 26, 2026, Bradley & Daytona Railway and Land Co. LLC filed notice demanding Power REIT call a special meeting of the preferred stockholders to elect trustees to the Board.
