= Railroads connecting New York City and Chicago =

The Northeast and the Great Lakes states are connected by an east-west railroad corridor. The endpoints of this corridor are New York City and Chicago. Along the way, the corridor passed through cities such as Philadelphia, Baltimore, Washington, D.C., Pittsburgh, Buffalo and Cleveland. There were branches off the corridor to cities such as Cincinnati, Detroit, Indianapolis, and St. Louis. For over a century, this corridor was dominated by four major railroads, and an aggregate of other railroads that served as a fifth option.

== New York Central Railroad ==
The first New York-Chicago route was provided on January 24, 1853 with the completion of the Toledo, Norwalk and Cleveland Railroad to Grafton, Ohio on the Cleveland, Columbus and Cincinnati Railroad. The route later became part of the Lake Shore and Michigan Southern Railway, owned by the New York Central Railroad. In 1914, the New York Central and Hudson River were merged with the Lake Shore and Michigan Southern Railway to create the New York Central Railroad, which ran the New York-Chicago route as one company.

== Pennsylvania Railroad ==
In 1857, the Fort Wayne Railroad Bridge was completed across the Allegheny River in Pittsburgh, Pennsylvania, and trains began to run from Philadelphia to Chicago along the Pennsylvania Railroad and Pittsburgh, Fort Wayne and Chicago Rail Road (later part of the PRR).

The Connecting Railway in Philadelphia opened for revenue service on June 3, 1867, with direct service between Philadelphia and Jersey City, New Jersey, across the Hudson River from New York. Through freight between Jersey City and Pittsburgh began the next month, and soon some trains began running between Jersey City and Chicago.

== Erie Railroad ==
The Erie Railroad was originally made to connect New York and Lake Erie. In 1941 they expanded to Chicago by merging with Nypano Railroad.

== Baltimore and Ohio Railroad ==
From its original charter terminus of Wheeling, West Virginia, reached in 1853, the Baltimore and Ohio Railroad pushed west by construction of new rails and by leasing other pre-existing ones. The B&O had reached Newark, Ohio by 1866, Sandusky by 1869, and had built a new line west into Chicago by 1874.

== Alphabet Route ==
"Alphabet Route" referred to a series of railroads linking Chicago with Baltimore on the East Coast. From west to east, this route consisted of the Nickel Plate Road (NKP, or New York, Chicago & St. Louis Railroad) going east from Chicago, connecting with what formerly had been the Wheeling and Lake Erie Railroad (acquired by the NKP in the late 1940s) at Cleveland. The NKP/W&LE went into southeastern Ohio at the West Virginia border to meet the Pittsburgh and West Virginia Railroad (P&WV). Finally the P&WV would meet the Western Maryland Railroad (WM) outside of Pittsburgh, and traffic was carried to Baltimore and beyond.
