= Gould transcontinental system =

Failed transcontinental railroad

The Gould transcontinental system was a system of railroads assembled by George Jay Gould I and the Fuller Syndicate in the early 1900s. This was Gould's attempt to fulfill a goal of his late father, financier Jay Gould. Due to financial troubles following the Panic of 1907, the system was never completed as a fully transcontinental line.

The system competed with systems similarly amalgamated and controlled by other railroad magnates including that of E. H. Harriman (who controlled the Union Pacific, Southern Pacific and B&O lines) and James J. Hill (who controlled Great Northern). Both Harriman and Hill were involved in the Northern Securities Company antitrust litigation during this time. Gould sought to avoid similar litigation by acquiring control of railroads that could be chained together at their endpoints to make a longer system; under Gould's plan, Missouri Pacific Railroad would become a holding company owning the other lines in the system. After the 1907 financial panic, there were rumors of a merger of the Harriman and Gould systems. But as many of the eastern roads controlled by Gould entered receivership after 1907 despite receiving investment funds from John D. Rockefeller, and Gould's ouster from Missouri Pacific leadership in 1915, the complete transcontinental plan fell apart.

At its peak the system stretched from San Francisco to Pittsburgh, and comprised the following railroads:

- Western Pacific Railway
- Rio Grande Western Railway
- Denver and Rio Grande Railroad
- Missouri Pacific Railroad
- Wabash Railroad
- Wheeling and Lake Erie Railroad
- Wabash Pittsburgh Terminal Railway
- A 150-mile (240 km)gap was left to complete the transcontinental route, including the gap between Pittsburgh and Connellsville, Pennsylvania) The State Line and Southern Railroad was chartered in 1910 to bridge the gap, and later the Pittsburgh and West Virginia Railroad was also intended to bridge the gap.
- Western Maryland Railroad

== See also ==
- First transcontinental railroad
- History of rail transport in the United States
