= Dakar-Port Sudan Railway =

Proposed transcontinental railway from Senegal to Sudan

The Dakar-Port Sudan Railway is a proposed 4,000 km long transcontinental railway between Dakar, Senegal and Port Sudan, Sudan. It was proposed in 2008-2010 to pass through several countries along the way with spur lines to capital cities not on the direct route.

== Route ==
The plan was to develop a railway network that would cover the whole of Africa. By comparison, except for the extreme south and extreme north of Africa, railways are fragmentary, and hampered by differences in track gauge. It would run through Senegal, Sudan, Chad, Nigeria, Niger, Burkina Faso and Mali.

== See also ==
- AfricaRail
