= McKeesport Police Department =

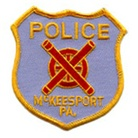
- Patch of the McKeesport Police Department
- Abbreviation: McKPD
- Motto: Ready to Protect, Proud to Serve

Agency overview
- Employees: 30
- Annual budget: US$5.1 million (2018)

Jurisdictional structure
- Operations jurisdiction: McKeesport, Pennsylvania, USA
- Legal jurisdiction: Municipal
- Governing body: McKeesport City Council

Operational structure
- Headquarters: 201 Lysle Boulevard; McKeesport, PA
- Officers: 30
- Civilians: 3
- Agency executive: Josh Alfer, Chief of Police

Facilities
- Boats: 1
- Dogs: 5

Website
- McKeesport Police Department website

The McKeesport Police Department, commonly referred to as McKeesport Police, is the primary law enforcement agency for the City of McKeesport, Pennsylvania. The department employs over 29 officers, and serves an area of 6.47mi² and population of approximately 21,000, including the borough of Dravosburg. It was the second largest municipal law enforcement agency in Allegheny County.

== Organization ==
The executive of the McKeesport Police Department is the Chief of Police, who is appointed by the mayor, and assisted by the Assistant Chief of Police. The Chief of Police is Josh Alfer, since February 2025. The department is in turn divided into two bureaus, each commanded by a Captain.

=== Patrol Bureau ===
The Patrol Bureau provides patrol and response services. The department operates a three shift structure. This consists of the 7 a.m. to 3 p.m. "daylight" shift, the 3 p.m. to 11 p.m. shift and the 11 p.m. to 7 a.m. shift. At minimum, each shift consists of a commander, a warden, and three to four motor patrol units. Additional motor patrol units and a field supervisor may be deployed. In addition, foot and bicycle patrol officers may be assigned to downtown and neighbourhood areas respectively (no longer provided). Two specialist units support patrol officers, each supervised by a lieutenant.

- Traffic Division - Responsible for providing traffic enforcement. Also attached to this division are the six Crossing Guards and Head Crossing Guard, who wears the insignia of a Sergeant.
- K9 Unit - ResponsIble for providing narcotic, firearm and explosive detection and fugitive tracking and apprehension support. The unit consists of four dogs. These officers are integrated into in general patrol assignments on a day-to-day basis.

=== Detective Bureau ===
The Detective Bureau is responsible for investigation of most serious crimes, or those beyond the time constraints or expertise of patrol officers, which occur in the city. Homicide, arson and other major crimes which require investigative or forensic support are handled cooperatively with the Allegheny County Police Department's Detective Bureau. The department intelligence officer is responsible for reviewing crime reports generated by patrol officers, determining where further investigation is appropriate and assigning detectives from one of the four investigative units. Each is supervised by a lieutenant, except for the single Computer Officer who is not a detective. This role is supervised by the lieutenant responsible for criminal investigations.

- Criminal - Responsible for the investigation of all crimes against people and property.
- Narcotics - Responsible for investigation and suppression of illegal narcotics. Detectives from this unit frequently spend time assigned to federal, state and county drug task forces.
- Juvenile - Responsible for the investigation of crimes committed by or involving juveniles, and works with other units to investigate crimes primarily within their remit.
- Computer - Responsible for the investigation of crimes committed online, including sale of illegal goods and child exploitation.

== Extended Jurisdiction ==
=== Municipal ===
The McKeesport Police Department currently provides law enforcement services to the Borough of Dravosburg, which is connected to the city via the W.D. Mansfield Memorial Bridge. The Dravosburg Police Department was abolished in 2011, and the McKeesport Police Department appointed by the borough council to provide contract police services, including investigations. In January 2014, a five-year extension was approved up to Dec. 31, 2019 at an increasing cost of between $140,000 and $150,000.

=== School District ===
The McKeesport Police Department currently provides one School Resource Officer to the McKeesport Area School District, responsible for safety and security at the McKeesport Area High School and the adjoining Founders Hall Middle School. In May 2019, the district announced it would be creating an internal school police body, and would subsequently eliminate the position of School Resource Officer. This position was eliminated in 2021.

== Ranks ==
Title	Insignia
Chief of Police	
Assistant Chief of Police	
Captain	
Lieutenant	
Sergeant	
Detective	No Insignia
Patrolman	No Insignia

The position of Deputy Chief of Police was abolished in 2011 to reduce the inflated number of command level positions.

== Uniform ==
The standard department uniform is all black, with subdued department patches on each shoulder and the officer's name embroidered over the right breast. The department badge is unique in design, and is worn in the traditional left breast position. The officer's badge number is worn on each collar of the uniform shirt. Officers no longer wear traditional service caps for general patrol duties, which have been replaced with black baseball caps featuring the department badge.

Detectives generally wear casual business attire, or the casual uniform of khaki pants and a black or dark grey polo bearing their embroidered name and rank over the right breast and embroidered badge over the left breast.

== Equipment ==
Sidearms are varied within the department, as all officers are responsible for purchasing their own firearms and less-lethal equipment. Typically, officers carry a sidearm, additional magazines, expandable baton, OC spray and handcuffs. Radios and department issued shotguns are available to officers on a shared basis. These are signed out and returned at the end of shift. Some officers have opted to purchase their own radios, shotguns, TASERs or long rifles.

== Technology ==
The department utilizes the Visual Alert records management system.

In 2020 the department began exploring the possibility of utilizing ShotSpotter gunshot detection technology to combat shots fired calls and reduce response time. This would be expected to be purchased through funding from the Community Oriented Policing Services Office.

== Vehicles ==
The department operates a varied mix of marked patrol vehicles including the Ford Police Interceptor Utility and Sedan, Chevrolet Suburban, Chevrolet Tahoe, Dodge Durango, and the discontinued Ford Crown Victoria Police Interceptor and E-350. Two Harley-Davidson Electraglide motorcycles are also used for traffic and escort details. The K9 Unit operates marked vehicles adapted for canine transport including the Dodge Charger Pursuit and the Ford Explorer and Crown Victoria in slick-top configuration. For detectives, the Ford Crown Victoria continues to serve as the primary unmarked vehicle along with the Chevrolet Tahoe and Dodge Charger.

The department operates a 24-foot Firehawk boat with firefighting capabilities. This was built by Harbor Guard Boats in 2008 through a Department of Justice grant and is operated jointly with the McKeesport Fire Department. This replaced converted pleasure craft previously used by the two departments. The department also operates a trailer-based mobile substation, primarily deployed at the annual International Village. The substation includes a public area, office space and kitchen facilities.

The standard livery of marked vehicles is white or dark blue with red lettering and a red over blue stripe along each side of the vehicle. Each vehicle also bears the shield of a deceased officer affixed as a decal to the front quarter panel. A number of standard patrol vehicles lack roof-mounted, replaced with visor lighting as a cost saving measure. A number of marked Ford Crown Victoria's also feature wrap-around push bars.

Beginning in 2000, the department has relied primarily on grants to purchase replacement police vehicles. These have, at times, replaced vehicles with approximately 200,000 miles on them. The department has recently looked to purchasing used vehicles from other departments.

== Union ==
Employees which are not exempted are represented by Teamster Union Local #205, since 2000. Prior to the Teamsters appointment as the bargaining agent, officers were represented by the Fraternal Order of Police. This change was made following successful legal action in relation to allegations of political interference in the belief in would prevent future occurrences.

== Deceased Officers ==
Since the establishment of the department, seven members have died in the line of duty.

Officer	Date of death	Details
Patrolman John E. Clifford	Wednesday, December 15, 1915	Vehicular assault
Patrolman Anthony Hlavaty	Wednesday, May 16, 1917	Motorcycle crash
Patrolman Charles Samuel Paist	Wednesday, March 15, 1922	Motorcycle crash
Patrolman Max Lefkowitz	Wednesday, May 14, 1924	Gunfire
Patrolman Charles E. Bartlett	Sunday, March 20, 1932	Heart attack
Patrolman John Henry Jones Sellman	Wednesday, March 18, 1936	Drowning
Police Officer Frank Albert Miller, Jr.	Wednesday, November 10, 1993	Gunfire
Patrolman Sean L. Sluganski	Monday, February 6, 2023	Gunfire
