= McKeesport Fire Department =

Fire department of McKeesport, Pennsylvania

Operational area
- Country: United States
- State: Pennsylvania
- City: McKeesport

Agency overview
- Annual calls: 1,496 (2025)
- Employees: 35
- Annual budget: $2.89 Million
- Staffing: Career
- Fire chief: Kevin Kovach
- IAFF: 10

Facilities and equipment
- Stations: 2
- Engines: 2
- Quints: 2
- Rescue boats: 1

Website
- Official website
- Official IAFF

The McKeesport Fire Department, officially the McKeesport Bureau of Fire, provides fire protection, all-hazards emergency response, and fire safety education to the City of McKeesport.

== Organization ==
The executive of the McKeesport Fire Department is the fire chief, who is appointed by the mayor. The current fire chief is Jeffrey Tomovcsik, appointed on July 1, 2015. Chief Tomovcsik announced his pending retirement December 2025. The department consists of four platoons, each comprising one deputy chief, one captain and two or three firefighters, as well as sixteen part-time firefighters and the city electrician. Each platoon is on duty for a 24‐hour period, followed by 72 hours off duty. This is supplemented by four part‐time personnel each shift working 8- 12- 16- or 24‐hour periods.

== Facilities ==
=== Station 1 ===
This facility is located within the McKeesport Public Safety Building on Lyle Boulevard in downtown McKeesport and serves as the administrative headquarters.

- Truck 190 - 2017 Spartan Gladiator/4-Guys/RK
- Chief 190 - 2022 Ford Explorer Chief's vehicle
- Command 190 - 2022 Ford F-250

=== Station 2 ===
This facility is located on Eden Park Boulevard in Renziehausen Park and serves as the home of the department's reserve apparatus.

- Engine 190-1 2016 - Spartan MetroStar/4-Guys Pumper
- Engine 190-2 (Reserve) - 2009 Seagrave Pumper
- Truck 190-2 (Reserve) - 2001 HME SMEAL 105' (ex-Butler Twp.) Quint
- Safety Demonstration Trailer

== River rescue ==
The department provides river rescue services in conjunction with the McKeesport Police Department, with medical support from the McKeesport Ambulance Rescue Service. The department previously contributed resources to the Allegheny County Swiftwater/Flood Response Team which ended in 2012. Under agreement with the United States Coast Guard, McKeesport River Rescue responds to incidents along the Youghiogheny River and along the Monongahela River between the Elizabeth and Braddock.

The department operates a 26-foot Firehawk boat with firefighting capabilities. This was built by Harbor Guard Boats in 2008 through a Department of Justice grant and is operated jointly with the police department. This replaced converted pleasure craft previously used by the department.

== History ==
=== 1873-1891 ===
The Eagle Volunteer Fire Company was established in the then Borough of McKeesport in 1873. On October 4, 1877, McKeesport suffered a major fire when the Enterprise Foundry and Car Shop at Fifth Avenue and Market Street caught alight. Rapid spread resulted in damage to 32 buildings. The first organized department was created by the borough in 1885 by hiring one man responsible for maintaining a hose reel and a hook and ladder. The first officially recorded fire occurred on December 9, 1887, at the City Flour Mill on Jerome Street and caused an estimated $60,000 in damage.

=== 1891-2000 ===
The department expanded greatly following McKeesport's incorporation as a city in 1891. In 1892 two fire stations were built at a combined cost of $86,000 and in 1893 the Central Fire Station was constructed on Market Street and Fourth Avenue. In 1914, the first motor vehicle was placed in service at the Central Fire Station and in 1919, three pumpers were purchased and deployed to Central Station and Stations #2 and #3, as well as a 65 ft. aerial ladder to the Central Station and a ladder truck to Station #3. The same year, the system of firefighters being on duty for twenty-four hours a day for ten days, with a single rest day, was replaced with a two platoon system where firefighters worked 7 days a week, and on Sundays worked 24 hours straight when they changed from day to night shifts. On March 10, 1938, firefighters were given a day off each week by a change in state law and 1951 the system was completely overhauled as firefighters were put on eight hour shifts.

Between 1950 and the mid-1960s the majority of the original stations were demolished as part of the city's redevelopment strategy.

On May 21, 1976, a fire developed on the roof of the Famous Department Store, believed to be caused by workers using cutting torches. The initial flames on the roof were spotted by Fire Chief David Fowler from his office in the nearby Municipal Building. Due to strong winds and holes cut in the roof which served as chimneys, the building was engulfed within four minutes and the fire subsequently spread over a two-block radius, destroying an Elks lodge, school, cinema, theater, stores and a restaurant and damaging a number of other businesses. Spot fires developed throughout the city due to flying embers. The department was unable to handle the scale of the fire and was aided by companies from the cities of Duquesne, Clairton and Pittsburgh, over 40 volunteer fire companies from surrounding communities and the Pennsylvania National Guard.

In 1981, the fire department adopted the present system of platoons and rotation, allowing a reduction in the number of firefighters. In 1991 the current Station #2 on Eden Park Boulevard was opened.

=== 2000-present ===
On the day of the September 11, 2001, attacks, two McKeesport firefighters traveled to the World Trade Center site to participate in recovery efforts for a three-day period.

In November 2005, the first part-time firefighters in the history of the department were hired and in 2007, the department participated in an external firefighter certification testing pilot program. This saw the majority of the personnel certified to Firefighter II level.

In November 2013 Fire Chief Kevin Lust was injured while assisting in extinguishing a three-alarm fire. He was temporarily replaced by Captain Jeff List during his two-month recovery. List was subsequently appointed Fire Chief in January 2015 on an interim basis, but declined permanent appointment to the position in late June when Jeffrey Tomovcsik was then appointed Chief. Tomovcsik would retire in December 2025 accepting a Deputy Chief position with the Midland Fire Department in Midland, MI. This led to the city searching externally for a chief. Flashover Fire equipment sales owner Ron Vezzani was offered and briefly accepted the role before ultimately withdrawing his interest. The role was then offered to veteran firefighter Kevin Kovach. During a severe ice storm in November 2014, two firefighters suffered minor to moderate injuries when Engine 190 (2009 Seagrave) skidded on black ice on a ramp by the McKeesport-Duquesne Bridge, left the road and rolled down an embankment. The apparatus was deemed a total loss and sold to a heavy equipment rebuilding company where it was refurbished to modern standards. The apparatus was repurchased by the department a few year later after it failed to sell in online auctions and the price was reduced.

In 2015, the department purchased two custom-built apparatus, re-adopting the historical all-red paint scheme.

In 2019, the department achieved recognition by the Pennsylvania Office of the State Fire Commissioner as a department with 100% of their personnel certified at a minimum of PA & ProBoard Firefighter 1 level. Making the department 1 of around 30 fire departments in the Commonwealth with that recognition. Additionally, all of the personnel are certified at the PA & ProBoard Firefighter 2 level with several members holding ProBoard certifications as Fire Officers, Fire Instructors, Fire Inspectors and others along with certification as Water Rescue Technicians.

== Union ==
Employees which are not exempted are represented by the International Association of Firefighters Local 10.

== Fallen firefighters ==
To date, seven members of the department have died in the line of duty.

Name	Date of death
Samuel Roseborough	October 24, 1899
John Norton	March 16, 1915
Samuel Weimer	July 20, 1936
Theodore Keenan	September 13, 1952
Gabor Horvath	October 14, 1972
Carmen Lettieri	February 8, 1985
Vincent Wassel	March 4, 2017
