= Dravosburg, Pennsylvania =

Borough in Pennsylvania, US

- Borough
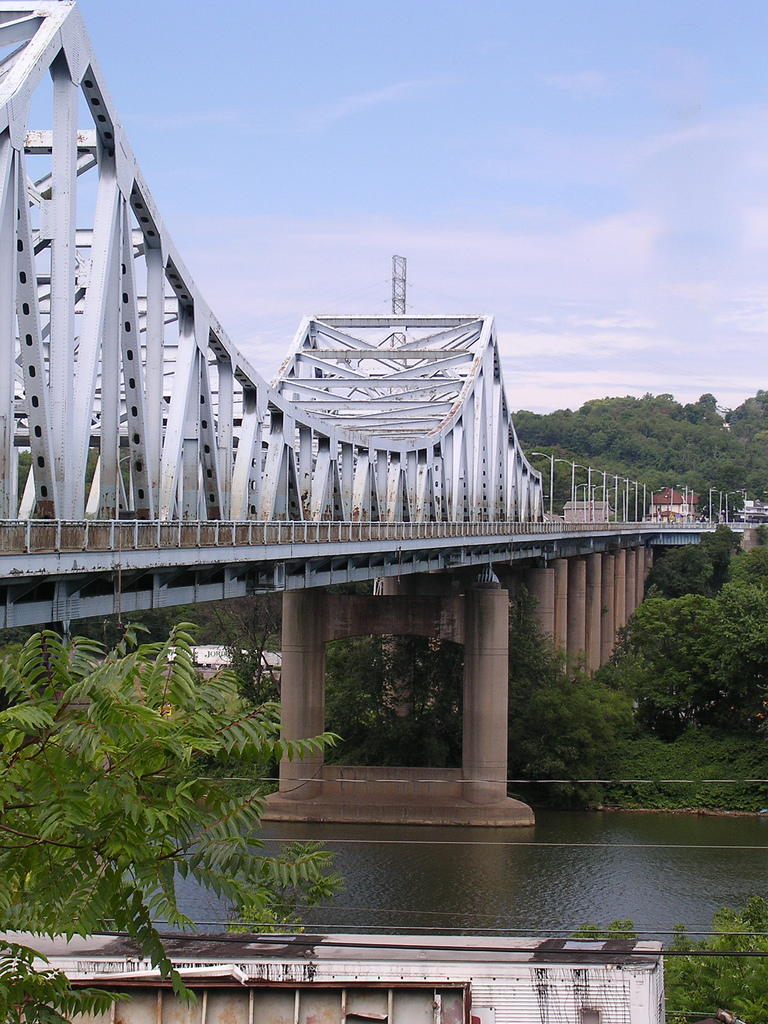
- The W.D. Mansfield Memorial Bridge

- Location in Allegheny County and the U.S. state of Pennsylvania.
- Coordinates: 40°21′1″N 79°53′22″W
- Country: United States
- State: Pennsylvania
- County: Allegheny

Area
  - Total: 1.06 sq mi (2.75 km^{2})
  - Land: 0.97 sq mi (2.50 km^{2})
  - Water: 0.097 sq mi (0.25 km^{2})

Population (2020)
  - Total: 1,612
  - Density: 1,668.1/sq mi (644.06/km^{2})
- Time zone: UTC-5 (Eastern (EST))
  - Summer (DST): UTC-4 (EDT)
- ZIP code: 15034
- Area code: 412
- FIPS code: 42-19856
- Website: www.dravosburg.org

Dravosburg (/drəˈvoʊzbɜːrɡ/ druh-VOZE-burg) is a borough in Allegheny County, Pennsylvania, United States, and is part of the Pittsburgh Metro Area. The population was 1,612 at the 2020 census. Dravosburg is located along the Monongahela River.

== History ==
A post office called Dravosburg(h) has been in operation since 1862. The borough was named for John F. Dravo, a mine owner. The town was struck by a severe tornado on June 23, 1944.

== Geography ==
Dravosburg is located at 40°21′1″N 79°53′22″W (40.350219, -79.889391).

According to the United States Census Bureau, the borough has a total area of 1.1 square miles (2.8 km^{2}), of which 1.0 square mile (2.6 km^{2}) is land and 0.1 square miles (0.26 km^{2}), or 9.73%, is water.

Dravosburg is bounded on the north, west and south by West Mifflin. To the east is the Monongahela River and the city of McKeesport. The cities of Duquesne and Clairton are also nearby.

== Surrounding and adjacent neighborhoods ==
By land, Dravosburg is entirely surrounded by West Mifflin. Across the Monongahela River to the east, Dravosburg runs adjacent with McKeesport and Glassport, both boroughs sharing a direct connector via Mansfield Bridge.

== Government and politics ==
Presidential elections results
Year	Republican	Democratic	Third parties
2020	54% 486	43% 392	1% 15
2016	56% 467	41% 342	3% 23
2012	45% 365	54% 439	1% 14

== Emergency services ==
Law enforcement and emergency medical services are contracted to the McKeesport Police Department and McKeesport Ambulance Rescue Service respectively. Dravosburg is served by its own volunteer fire department.

== Demographics ==
Historical population
Census	Pop.	Note	%±
1880	850		—
1910	1,895		—
1920	2,204		16.3%
1930	2,391		8.5%
1940	2,277		−4.8%
1950	3,786		66.3%
1960	3,458		−8.7%
1970	2,916		−15.7%
1980	2,511		−13.9%
1990	2,377		−5.3%
2000	2,015		−15.2%
2010	1,792		−11.1%
2020	1,612		−10.0%

As of the 2000 census, there were 2,015 people, 948 households, and 563 families residing in the borough. The population density was 1,981.8 inhabitants per square mile (765.2/km^{2}). There were 1,021 housing units at an average density of 1,004.2 per square mile (387.7/km^{2}). The racial makeup of the borough was 98.71% White, 0.50% African American, 0.25% Native American, 0.25% from other races, and 0.30% from two or more races. Hispanic or Latino of any race were 0.60% of the population.

There were 948 households, out of which 22.6% had children under the age of 18 living with them, 47.0% were married couples living together, 9.6% had a female householder with no husband present, and 40.6% were non-families. 36.8% of all households were made up of individuals, and 18.6% had someone living alone who was 65 years of age or older. The average household size was 2.13 and the average family size was 2.77.

In the borough the population was spread out, with 18.5% under the age of 18, 7.2% from 18 to 24, 28.0% from 25 to 44, 26.6% from 45 to 64, and 19.7% who were 65 years of age or older. The median age was 42 years. For every 100 females, there were 84.0 males. For every 100 females age 18 and over, there were 83.3 males.

The median income for a household in the borough was $30,461, and the median income for a family was $39,663. Males had a median income of $30,435 versus $22,232 for females. The per capita income for the borough was $17,264. About 7.5% of families and 12.6% of the population were below the poverty line, including 17.7% of those under age 18 and 8.4% of those age 65 or over.
