= Project Iron Boomerang =

Proposed railway line in Australia

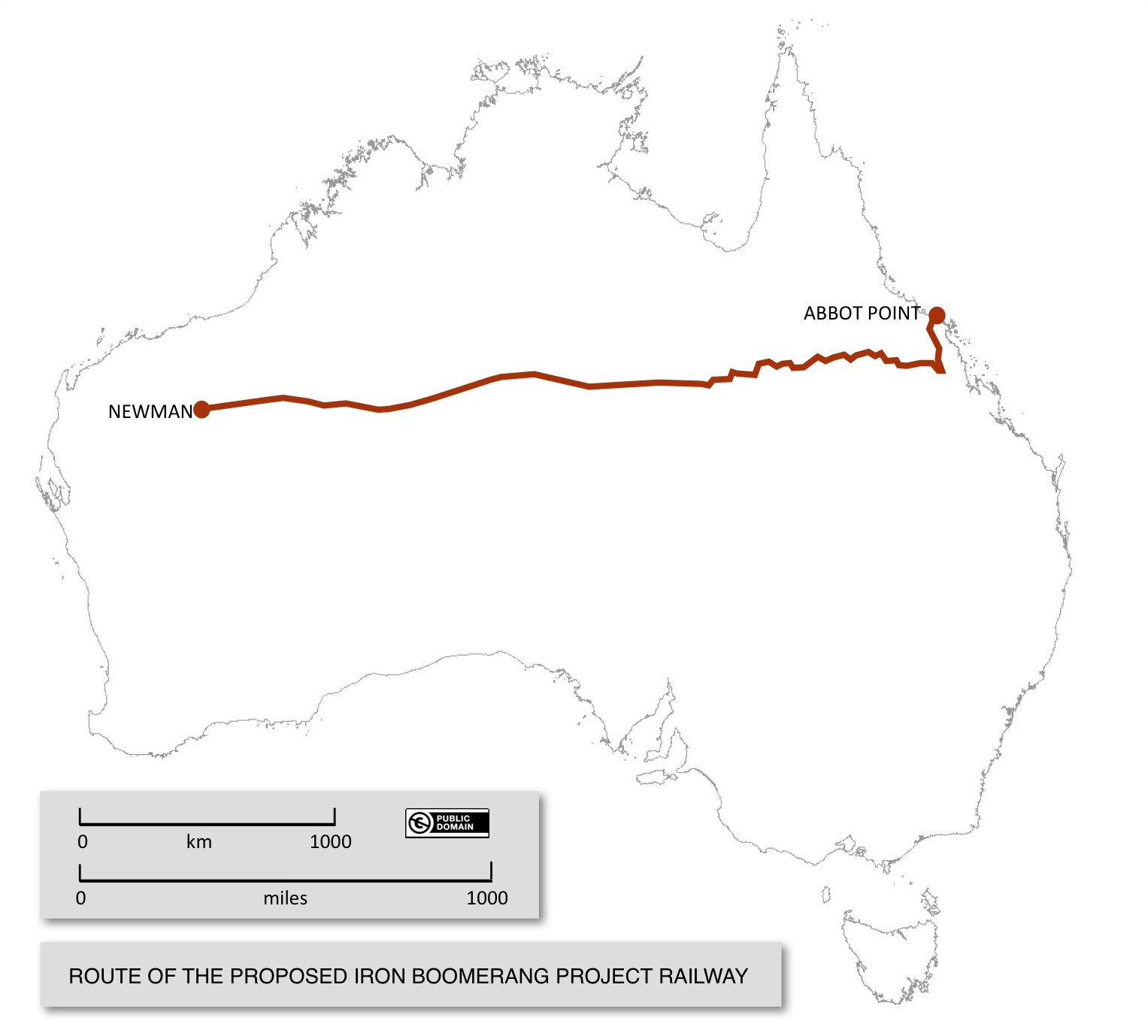
Proposed route of the railway at the heart of Project Iron Boomerang

Project Iron Boomerang is a proposal, originated in 2006, to build a multi-user rail corridor spanning northern Australia and to facilitate placement of five steel-making plants at each end, owned and operated by steel mill companies. A key element of its projected feasibility was the elimination of inefficient, unproductive and environmentally damaging empty return train-loads. The termini of the railway line were projected to be Newman, Western Australia and Abbot Point, Queensland, about 3000 km (1860 mi) apart.

The proponent is a private company, East West Line Parks Pty Ltd. As of 2015, Shane Condon was stated as being the founder and managing director.

An Australian Broadcastion Corporation report in 2011 stated that acquisition of land had begun. It also reported a Western Australian resources expert as saying the plan was extremely unlikely to succeed because Australia's "high wage, high dollar environment" made the cost of producing steel too high to develop a new project, and in the environment at that time it was hard to find a business case.

In 2019, the company reported to a mining and metallurgy conference that pre-feasibility and project design phases had been completed; the initial aim of the next stage was to obtain commitment of engagement from at least three global steel companies before completing an environmental impact statement and obtaining government approvals. The company's schedule anticipated that design and construction of the railway would be completed, and steel production would commence, in 2025.

In 2020, a news article outlined the project's potential economic feasibility and national benefits.

In February 2022, a plan for an optical fibre cable system along the route of the railway, to be laid when the project started, was reported. At the same time, the company's website stated that the three-year bankable approval stage would be reached by 2018 and the 3 1/2-year commissioning and construction stage would be complete by 2022. As of June 2022, however, no announcement had been made by the company to indicate that either event has occurred.

== Parliament inquiry ==
On 5 September 2022, the Australian Senate passed a motion to establish an inquiry into the project. The motion was sponsored by One Nation Senator Malcolm Roberts. The project was referred to the Senate Standing Committees on Rural and Regional Affairs and Transport. A report was due on 11 May 2023, but the deadline was extended, and the report was tabled on 10 August 2023.
