= Fuller Syndicate =

The Fuller Syndicate was a group of American financiers that invested in railroads in the late 19th and early 20th centuries.

The group was organized by investor Edward Laton Fuller, President of the International Salt Company, and led by George Jay Gould I. Gould, the President of the Denver and Rio Grande Western Railroad and the Missouri Pacific Railroad, had acquired control of several railroad companies in an attempt to build a transcontinental rail network c. 1900. (See Gould transcontinental system.) Other members of the syndicate included Myron T. Herrick, former Governor of Ohio and U.S. Ambassador to France; Winslow S. Pierce, General Counsel of the Gould organization; Joseph Ramsey, Jr., president of the Wabash Railroad; and Alvin W. Krech, vice president of the Wheeling and Lake Erie Railroad.

The syndicate acquired control of the Western Maryland Railway and the West Virginia Central and Pittsburg Railway in 1902, and Ramsey became president of these companies in 1903. They acquired the George's Creek and Cumberland Railroad in 1907. Following the Panic of 1907, Gould and the syndicate became financially overextended in 1908 and the railroads entered receivership.
