= Alphabet Route =

Map

The Alphabet Route was a coalition of railroads connecting the Midwest United States with the Northeast, as a freight alternate to the four major systems: the Pennsylvania Railroad, New York Central Railroad, Erie Railroad and Baltimore and Ohio Railroad.

The route was formed on February 11, 1931, with the completion of the Pittsburgh and West Virginia Railway to Connellsville, Pennsylvania, on the Western Maryland Railway. It was an outgrowth of George J. Gould's attempts to create a transcontinental railroad and later proposals made to the Interstate Commerce Commission for a "Fifth System" to supplement the four major systems; the consolidations planned to form those systems were stopped by the Great Depression.

Named for the many-lettered initials of the participating railroads, it used the following systems from west to east:

- New York, Chicago and St. Louis Railroad (NYC&StL/NKP) from Chicago, Illinois, and East St. Louis, Illinois, to Bellevue, Ohio
- Wheeling and Lake Erie Railway (W&LE) from Toledo, Ohio, via Bellevue to Pittsburgh Junction, Ohio
- Pittsburgh and West Virginia Railway (P&WV) from Pittsburgh Junction to Connellsville, Pennsylvania
- Western Maryland Railway (WM) from Connellsville via Hagerstown, Maryland, to Baltimore, Maryland, and Shippensburg, Pennsylvania
- Reading Company (RDG) from Shippensburg via Reading, Pennsylvania, to Philadelphia, Pennsylvania, and Allentown, Pennsylvania
- Central Railroad of New Jersey (CNJ) from Allentown via Easton, Pennsylvania, to Jersey City, New Jersey
- Lehigh and Hudson River Railway (L&HR) from Allentown via Easton (trackage rights on the CNJ) to Maybrook, New York
- New York, New Haven and Hartford Railroad (NYNH&H) from Maybrook via New Haven, Connecticut, and Providence, Rhode Island, to Boston, Massachusetts

Major yards on the line included:

- The NYC&StL's Bellevue Yard was just east of the junction with the W&LE at Bellevue, Ohio. Freight cars were transferred here between the two lines, leaving the same way they came; a direct connection avoiding the yard was impossible due to the lack of a suitable connecting track.
- The CNJ's Allentown Yard was just east of Allentown, Pennsylvania; the RDG and L&HR had trackage rights along the CNJ to the yard.
- The RDG's Rutherford Yard just east of Harrisburg, Pennsylvania; the RDG here combined traffic from Allentown (including L&HR traffic from New England via the NYNH&H through Maybrook), Jersey City and the New York / New Jersey metro area (via the CNJ to Allentown), and Philadelphia.
- The WM's Jamison Yard in Hagerstown, MD, where traffic from the RDG via Rutherford Yard was combined with traffic from Baltimore on the WM.
- The NYNH&H's Maybrook Yard was just east of the junction with the L&HR. Cars were transferred between the two lines.
- The NYNH&H's Cedar Hill Yard was in New Haven, Connecticut. Through trains continued on to Providence and Boston, while some freight was transferred to other NYNH&H lines at Cedar Hill.

The freight trains along the middle section of the route were known as Alpha Jets. The WM, P&WV and NKP (and later WM and Norfolk & Western, after merger of latter two lines into N&W in 1964) generally operated two daily "run-through" freight trains each way via their connection in Connellsville, Pennsylvania. The westbound trains were variously symbolled AJ-1 (Alpha Jet 1) and Advance AJ-1, 1st AJ-1 and 2nd AJ-1, then later PAJ-1 and WAJ-1. The eastbound runs were usually called AJ-2 and AJ-12, with an Advanced AJ-12 sometimes also running. These runs originated or terminated in either the RDG's Rutherford Yard near Harrisburg, PA or in the WM yard at Hagerstown, MD, and ran to or from Toledo, OH and Detroit, MI. The Advanced sections usually originated or terminated in Bellevue, OH. For a time during the 1970s, the RDG also symbolled its high-priority connection run from Philadelphia to Rutherford, PA as an Alpha Jet.

Three major sources of traffic for these trains were:

1. automobile manufacturing parts and supplies going from eastern factories to the Detroit and Toledo automotive manufacturing regions, and autos and manufactured items moving from these cities to the north eastern region;
2. high-priority boxcar loads (often from freight consolidation and forwarding companies such as Acme Fast Freight) moving to and from New England, the New York City area, Philadelphia and Baltimore to Detroit, Cleveland, Chicago and St. Louis via other trains connecting with the Alpha Jet schedules; and
3. trailer-on-flatcar (TOFC) service, especially to and from Philadelphia but also from the New York area via the CNJ, going to or from one of the above mid-western cities.

In the 1960s and early 1970s, the Alphabet Route partners promoted Alpha Jet service as an alternative to the TOFC service offered by the Pennsylvania Railroad (and then the Penn Central, after the Pennsylvania-New York Central merger in 1968) between Philadelphia and Chicago. The Pennsylvania offered 23-hour service between these points with its Truc Train runs, while the Alphabet Route partners offered 34-hour service (depending upon a prompt connection at Bellevue to the BC-1 priority freight to Chicago). Although this did not seem competitive, much of the 11-hour difference was due to departures and arrivals around midnight for the Pennsylvania service, whereas many shippers did not send and receive shipments during the night and thus could accept a mid-evening departure and a mid-morning arrival, as the Alpha Jet service could provide. Alpha Jet service was de-emphasized in the late 1970s and eventually ended by the early 1980s as the WM was fully integrated into the Chessie System (B&O and C&O), later to become CSX, which was and remains a major competitor of the N&W, later Norfolk Southern.

== See also ==
- Railroads connecting New York City and Chicago
