= W.D. Mansfield Memorial Bridge =

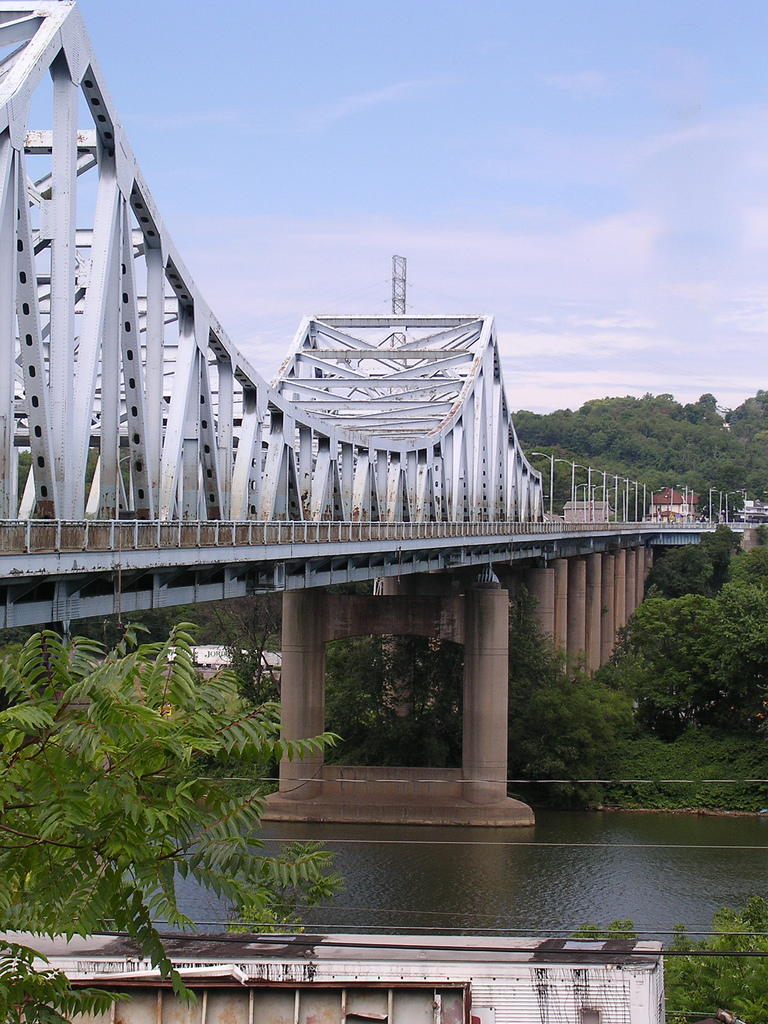
- The William D. Mansfield Memorial Bridge spans the Monongahela River between McKeesport and Dravosburg; view from the river's McKeesport bank
- Coordinates: 40.3452°N 79.8856°W
- Carries: 4 divided lanes of traffic
- Crosses: Monongahela River
- Locale: McKeesport, Pennsylvania and Dravosburg, Pennsylvania
- Other name: Dravosburg Bridge

Characteristics
- Design: Cantilever bridge
- Longest span: 480.0 feet (146 m)
- Clearance below: 65.3 feet (19.9 m)

History
- Opened: April 24, 1951

Location
- Interactive map of W.D. Mansfield Memorial Bridge

The W.D. Mansfield Memorial Bridge, commonly known as the Dravosburg Bridge, is a cantilever bridge that carries vehicular traffic across the Monongahela River between McKeesport, Pennsylvania and Dravosburg, Pennsylvania in the United States.

It is a high-level bridge that passes over railyard, industrial sites, and Route 837, to connect Fifth Avenue in McKeesport and Richland Avenue in Dravosburg.

== History ==
This structure replaced the low-level 1889 Dravosburg–Reynoldton Bridge. The steel from the Wabash Bridge, demolished in 1948, was used in the construction of this bridge.

On September 18, 1951, Buncher Co. of Pittsburgh won the demolition contract via open bidding, with a total of $23,971. The losing bids on the project stretched from $37,000–$93,200. In order to not interfere with boating traffic, the old span's pilings would be required to be removed to a point 19 feet (5.8 m) below the surface of the Monongahela River. Demolition of the 1889 bridge began after the formal opening of the replacement bridge. On December 28, 1951, the final span of the steel structure came down after torches melted the Dravosburg side's girders. A tugboat attached to a barge pulled the structure down into the river on the second attempt.

As built, the Mansfield Bridge carried trolley tracks of Pittsburgh Railways route 56 McKeesport via 2nd Avenue. The trolley line was replaced by a bus on September 5, 1963.

The bridge is named for McKeesport politician William D. Mansfield, who served as an Allegheny County Commissioner and later as a State Senator.

== See also ==
- List of crossings of the Monongahela River
