= Wabash Pittsburgh Terminal =

Railroad station

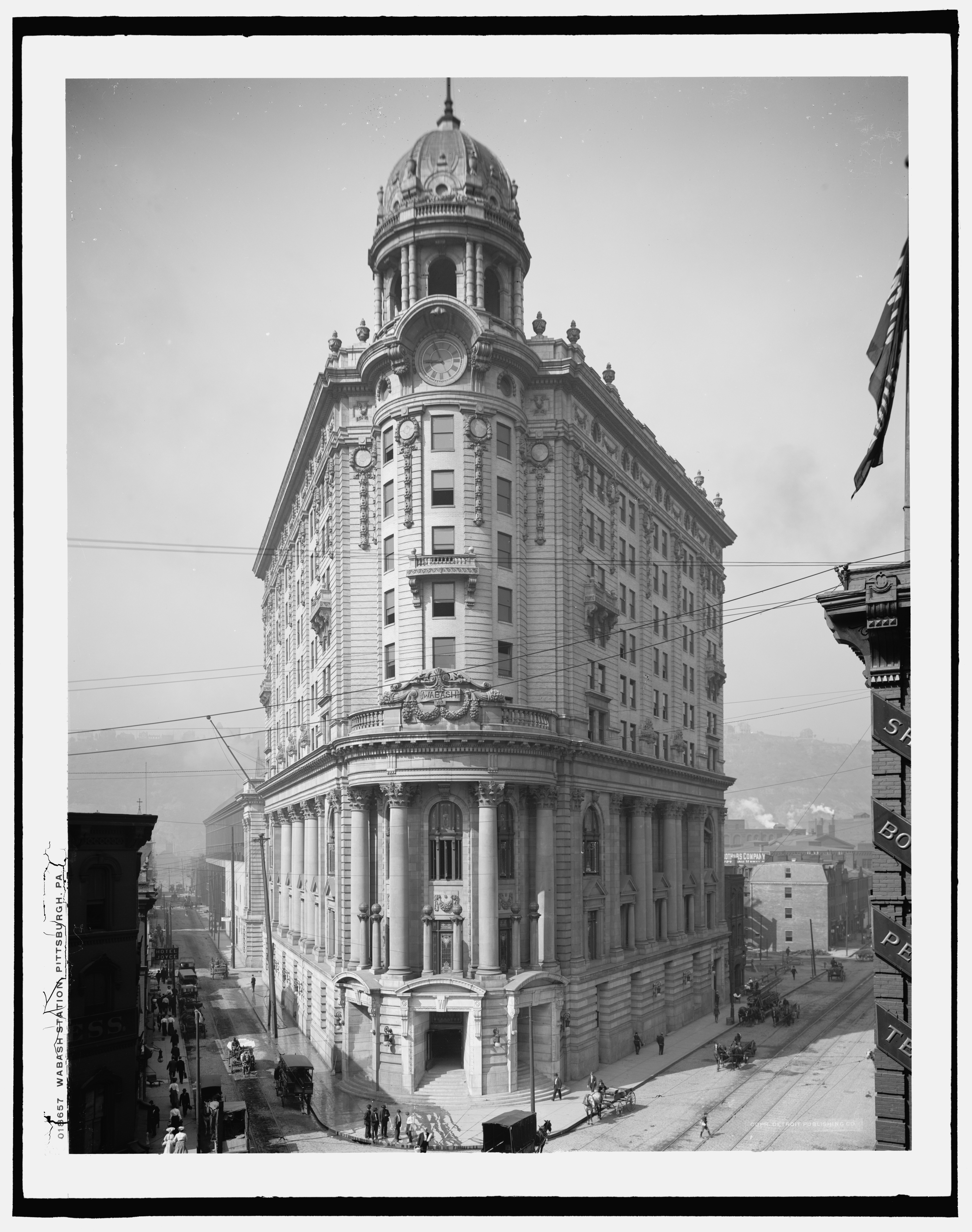
- The Wabash Pittsburgh Terminal building.

General information
- Coordinates: 40.4410°N 80.0045°W
- Platforms: 3
- Tracks: 6

History
- Opened: April 13, 1904
- Closed: October 31, 1931

Former services
Preceding station	Pittsburgh and West Virginia Railway	Following station
West Belt Junction toward Pittsburgh Junction	Main Line	Terminus
Location

The Wabash Pittsburgh Terminal was a railroad station located in Pittsburgh, Pennsylvania, United States. Constructed in 1903 and opened on April 13, 1904, the 11 floor Beaux-Arts domed 197 foot tall terminal was designed by Theodore Carl Link and cost George Jay Gould $800,000 ($28.7 million in 2025 dollars). Floors 1 through 3 contained ticketing, passenger waiting areas and some retail with floors 4 and above serving hundreds of offices of Gould's Wabash Railway Corporation. The terminal lasted only four years as a Wabash Railroad terminal when the Wabash Pittsburgh Terminal Railway entered receivership on May 29, 1908. The Wabash would go on to lose both this railway and end affiliation with the Wheeling and Lake Erie Railway. The terminal continued to service passenger traffic until October 31, 1931, but survived beyond that as an office building and freight-only facility. Upon its repurposing, the building also lost its 11th-floor cupola. The adjacent freight warehouse was closed after two successive fires on March 6, and March 22, 1946 destroyed most of the infrastructure. The station was announced for demolition on July 5, 1953 to make way for the Gateway Center complex. Demolition started on October 5, 1953 and was completed in early 1954.

== See also ==
- Pittsburgh & Lake Erie Railroad Station
- Grant Street Station
- Union Station (Pittsburgh)
- Baltimore and Ohio Station (Pittsburgh)
