= List of dams and reservoirs in Pennsylvania =

Following is a list of dams and reservoirs in Pennsylvania.

All major dams are linked below. The National Inventory of Dams defines any "major dam" as being 50 feet (15 m) tall with a storage capacity of at least 5,000 acre-feet (6,200,000 m^{3}), or of any height with a storage capacity of 25,000 acre-feet (31,000,000 m^{3}).

== Dams and reservoirs in Pennsylvania ==
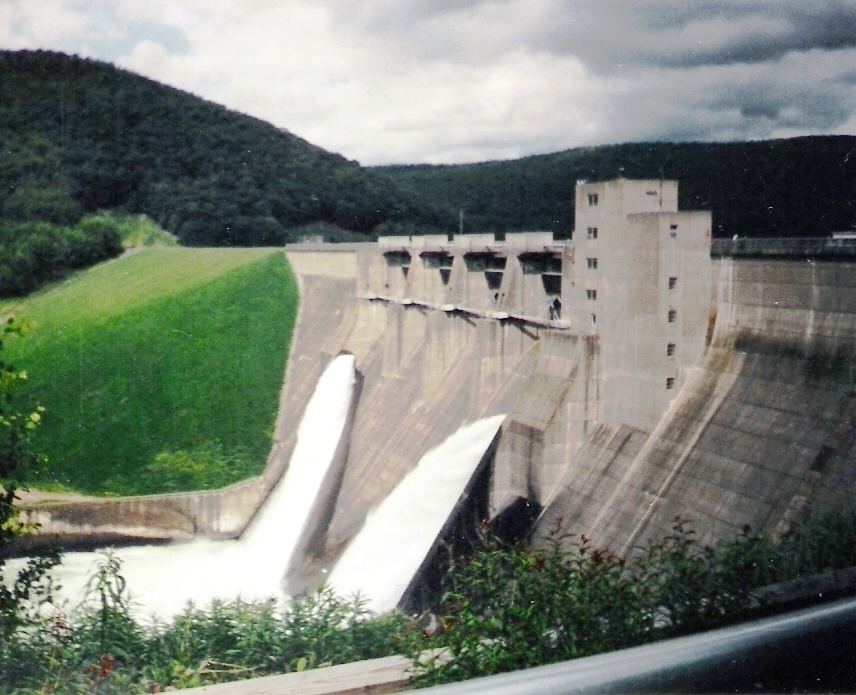
Kinzua Dam

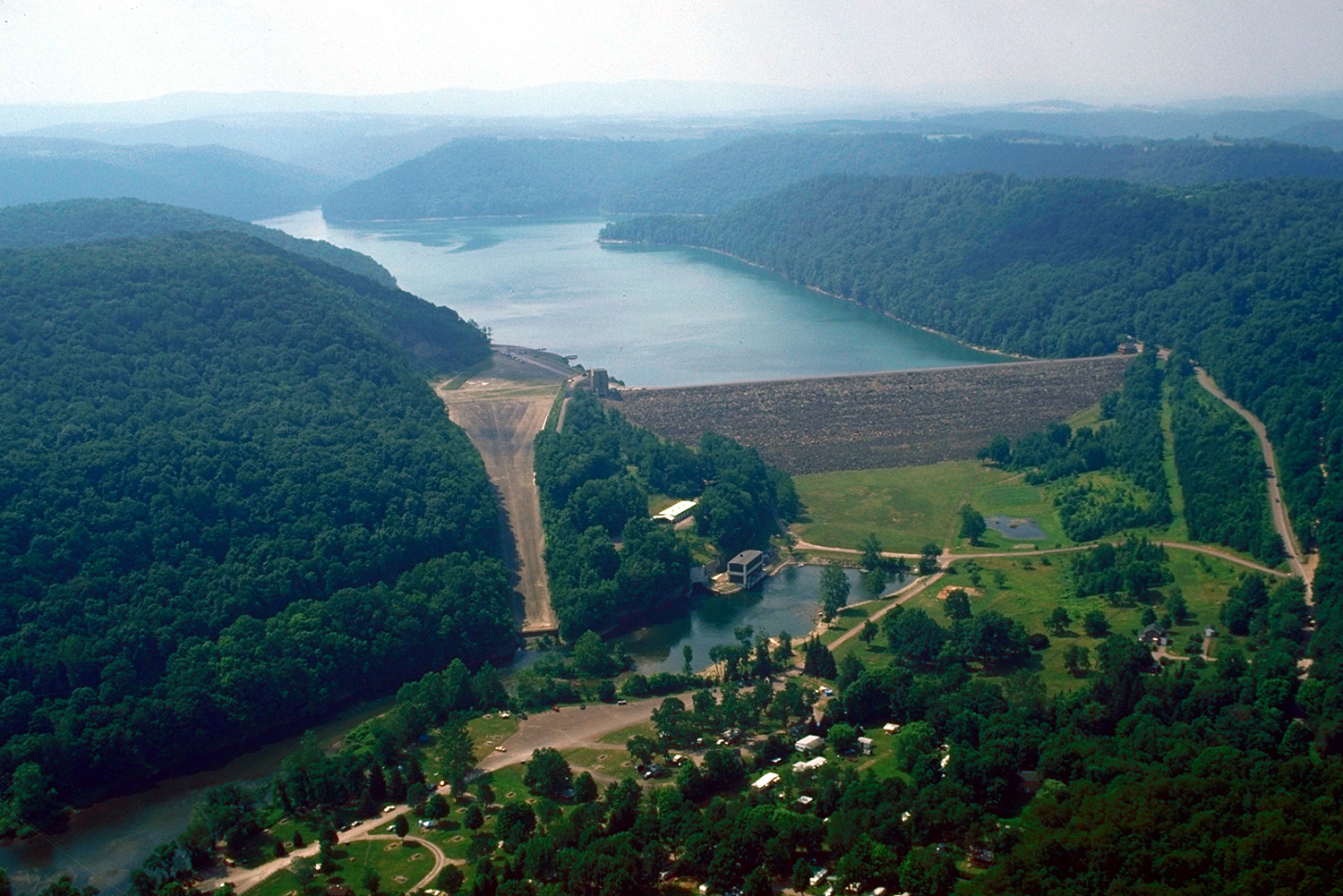
Youghiogheny River Lake

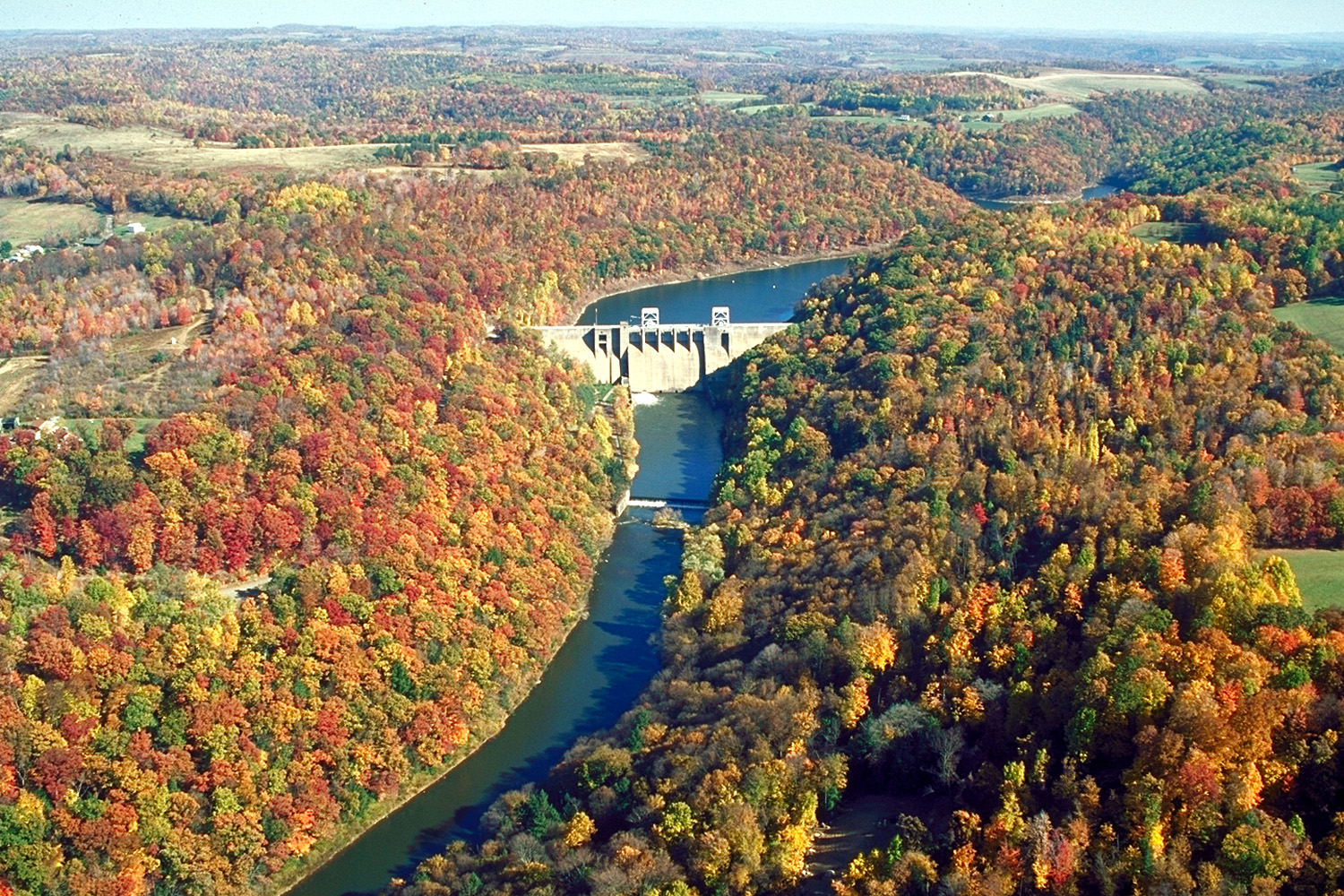
Mahoning Creek Dam and Lake

This list is incomplete. You can help Wikipedia by expanding it.

- Adam T. Bower Memorial Dam, Lake Augusta, Commonwealth of Pennsylvania
- Allegheny River Lock and Dam No. 2, USACE
- Allegheny River Lock and Dam No. 3, USACE
- Allegheny River Lock and Dam No. 4, USACE
- Allegheny River Lock and Dam No. 5, USACE
- Allegheny River Lock and Dam No. 6, USACE
- Allegheny River Lock and Dam No. 7, USACE
- Allegheny River Lock and Dam No. 8, USACE
- Allegheny River Lock and Dam No. 9, USACE
- Alvin R. Bush Dam, USACE
- Austin Dam (Bayliss Dam), unnamed reservoir, privately owned (failed 1911)
- Beaver Run Dam, Beaver Run Reservoir, Municipal Authority Of Westmoreland County
- Beltzville Dam, Beltzville Lake, USACE
- Braddock Locks & Dam, Monongahela River, USACE
- Brandonville Pumping Station Dam, NDS ID Number PA-661 Susquehanna River Basin, Davis Run, Schuylkill County
- Charleroi Locks & Dam, Monongahela River, USACE
- Conemaugh Dam, Conemaugh River Lake, USACE
- Crooked Creek Dam, Crooked Creek Lake, United States Army Corps of Engineers
- Curwensville Dam, Curwensville Lake, USACE
- Dashields Locks and Dam, Ohio River, USACE
- Davis Island Lock and Dam Site, Ohio River, USACE (abandoned)
- DeHart Dam, Dehart Reservoir, City of Harrisburg
- Dock Street Dam, on the Susquehanna River, City of Harrisburg
- East Branch Clarion River Lake, USACE
- Elizabeth Locks & Dam, Monongahela River, USACE
- Emsworth Locks and Dams, Ohio River, USACE
- Francis E. Walter Dam, Francis E. Walter Reservoir, USACE
- George B. Stevenson Dam, USACE
- Grays Landing Lock & Dam, Monongahela River, USACE
- H. A. Stewart Dam, Latrobe Reservoir, City of Latrobe
- Holtwood Dam, Lake Aldred, Pennsylvania Power and Light
- Kinzua Dam, Allegheny Reservoir, USACE
- Lake Arthur Dam, Lake Arthur, Commonwealth of Pennsylvania
- Laurel Creek Dam, Municipal Authority of the Borough of Lewistown
- Laurel Run Dam, Laurel Run Reservoir, Johnstown Water Authority (failed)
- Letterkenny Dam, Letterkenny Reservoir on the Conodoguinet Creek, Letterkenny Industrial Development Authority and Franklin County General Authority
- Mahoning Creek Dam, Mahoning Creek Lake, USACE
- Maxwell Lock & Dam, Monongahela River, USACE
- Meadow Run Dam in Bear Creek, privately owned
- Meadow Grounds Dam, Meadow Grounds Lake, Pennsylvania Game Commission
- Montgomery Island Locks and Dam, Ohio River, USACE
- Mountain Lake Dam in Bear Creek, privately owned
- Nockamixon Dam, Lake Nockamixon, Commonwealth of Pennsylvania
- Point Marion Lock and Dam, unnamed reservoir on the Monongahela River, USACE
- Quemahoning Dam, Quemahoning Reservoir, Cambria Somerset Authority
- Raystown Dam, Raystown Lake, USACE
- Rocky Glen Dam in Moosic, former amusement park now privately owned (Dam lowered by request of DEP-Division of Dam Services)
- Safe Harbor Dam, Lake Clarke, Safe Harbor Water Power Corporation
- Segriest Dam, Lebanon Reservoir, City of Lebanon
- Shenango Dam, Shenango River Lake, USACE
- South Fork Dam, failed in 1889 causing the Johnstown Flood, privately owned
- Tionesta Dam, Tionesta Lake, USACE
- Wallenpaupack Dam, Lake Wallenpaupack, Talen Energy
- Warrior Ridge Dam and Hydroelectric Plant, unnamed reservoir, privately owned
- Wrightsville Dam, unnamed reservoir (demolished)
- Yellow Creek Dam, Yellow Creek Lake
- York Haven Dam, Lake Fredrick reservoir on the Susquehanna River, Cube Hydro Partners
- Youghiogheny Dam, Youghiogheny River Lake, USACE

== See also ==
- List of dam removals in Pennsylvania
- List of dams and reservoirs of the Susquehanna River
