= West Brownsville Junction Bridge =

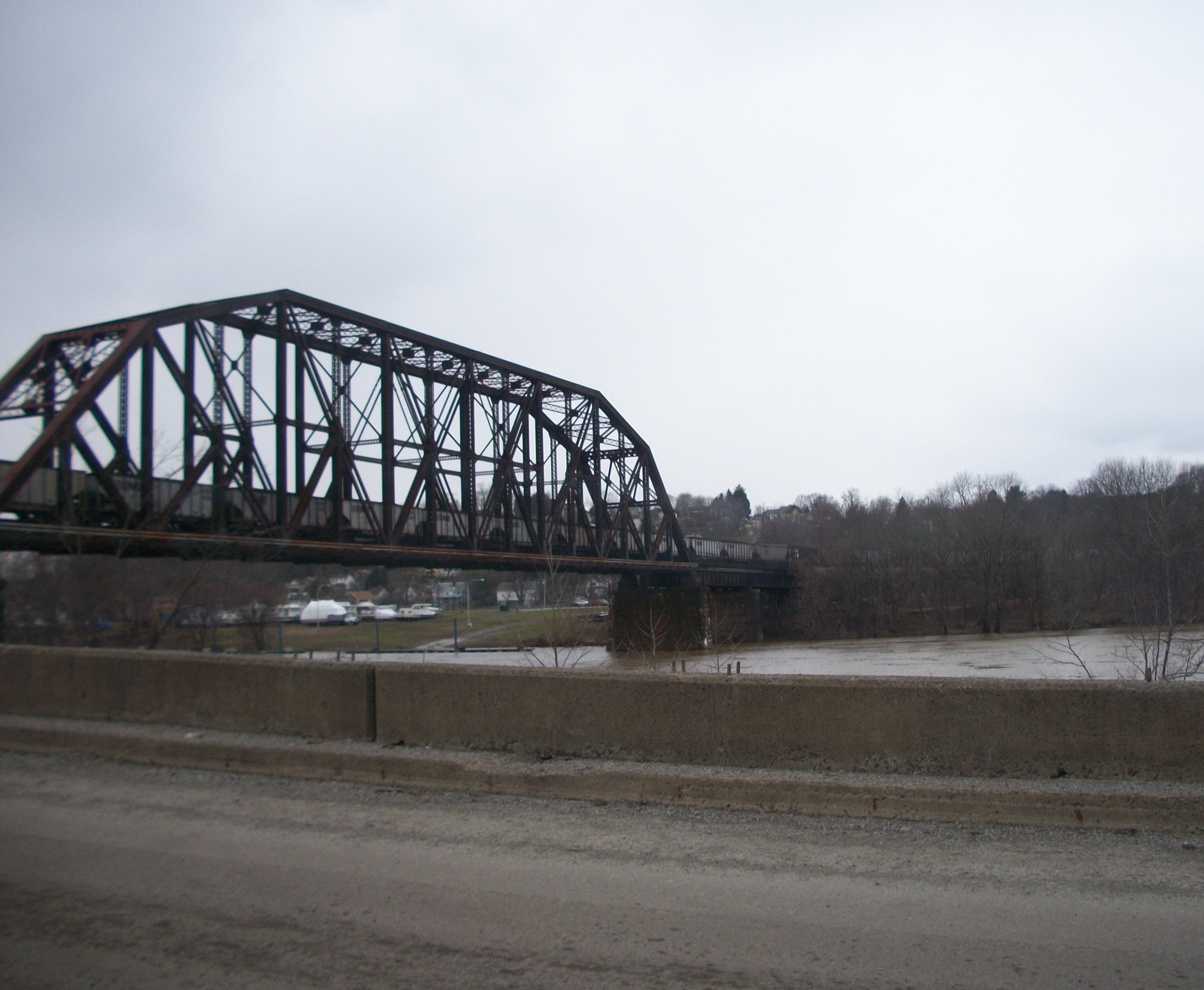
- Coordinates: 40°02′02″N 79°52′35″W
- Carries: Norfolk Southern Railway
- Crosses: Monongahela River
- Locale: Brownsville Township, Pennsylvania and West Brownsville, Pennsylvania

Characteristics
- Design: Truss bridge
- Longest span: 401 feet (122 m)

History
- Opened: 1882

The West Brownsville Junction Bridge carries the Norfolk Southern Railway across the Monongahela River from Brownsville Township to West Brownsville in the state of Pennsylvania. The main span is a 401-foot (122 m) Pennsylvania (Petit) truss. The structure was originally designed by the Pennsylvania Railroad as a low-level connector between its mainline and Waynesburg Branch. Today, the bridge continues to serve the same purpose that it has since its inception, carrying coal trains between mines and power plants or other industrial sites.

== See also ==
- List of bridges documented by the Historic American Engineering Record in Pennsylvania
- List of crossings of the Monongahela River
