= List of crossings of the Monongahela River =

This is a complete list of current bridges and other crossings of the Monongahela River starting from Pittsburgh, Pennsylvania, where the river helps to form the headwaters of the Ohio River, and ending in Fairmont, West Virginia, where the West Fork River and Tygart Valley River combine to form the Monongahela.

== Pennsylvania ==
Image	Crossing	Carries	Location	Coordinates
Allegheny County
	Fort Pitt Bridge	I-376 / US 19 Truck / US 22 / US 30	Pittsburgh	40°26′20″N 80°00′40″W
	Smithfield Street Bridge	Smithfield Street	Pittsburgh	40°26′06″N 80°00′07″W
	Panhandle Bridge	Port Authority T Light Rail Line	Pittsburgh	40°25′59″N 79°59′53″W
	Liberty Bridge		Pittsburgh	40°25′58″N 79°59′48″W
	Philip Murray Bridge (South Tenth Street Bridge)	South Tenth Street	Pittsburgh	40°25′57″N 79°59′21″W
	Birmingham Bridge		Pittsburgh	40°26′00″N 79°58′25″W
	Hot Metal Bridge	Hot Metal Street	Pittsburgh	Part of the Great Allegheny Passage rail/bike trail.
	Glenwood Bridge	PA 885	Pittsburgh	
	Glenwood B&O Railroad Bridge	Allegheny Valley Railroad	Pittsburgh	
	Homestead Grays Bridge (Homestead High Level Bridge)	Blue Belt	Pittsburgh and Homestead	
	Munhall P&LE Railroad Bridge (Pinkerton's Landing Bridge)	CSX Pittsburgh Subdivision	Rankin and Munhall	
	Carrie Furnace Hot Metal Bridge (abandoned)	former Pennsylvania Union Railroad line	Rankin and Whitaker	
	George Rankin, Jr. Memorial Bridge (Rankin Bridge)	Green Belt	Rankin and Whitaker	
	Braddock Locks & Dam		Braddock and West Mifflin	
	Union Railroad Port Perry Bridge	Pennsylvania Union Railroad	North Braddock and Duquesne	40°23′17″N 79°51′08″W
	PRR Port Perry Bridge	Norfolk Southern Railway Port Perry Branch	North Versailles Twp and Duquesne	40°23′14″N 79°51′05″W
	McKeesport-Duquesne Bridge	Green Belt	McKeesport and Duquesne	40°21′28″N 79°50′38″W
	McKeesport Connecting Railroad Bridge (rails removed)	Great Allegheny Passage bike trail	McKeesport and West Mifflin	40°21′25″N 79°50′51″W
	W.D. Mansfield Memorial Bridge (Dravosburg Bridge)	Yellow Belt	McKeesport and Dravosburg	40°20′43″N 79°53′08″W
	Senator Edward P. Zemprelli Bridge (Clairton-Glassport Bridge)		Glassport and Clairton	40°18′47″N 79°53′13″W
	Union Railroad Clairton Bridge (Clairton Coke Works Bridge) (abandoned)	former Pennsylvania Union Railroad line	Lincoln and Clairton	40°17′40.1″N 79°52′01.3″W
	Regis R. Malady Bridge (Elizabeth Bridge)	PA 51	Elizabeth and West Elizabeth	
	Elizabeth Locks & Dam		Elizabeth and West Elizabeth	
Washington County–Allegheny County
	General Carl E. Vuono Bridge (Monongahela City Bridge)	PA 136	Forward Twp and Monongahela	
Washington County–Westmoreland County
	Stan Musial Bridge (Donora-Monessen Bridge)	C. Vance DieCas Highway	Monessen and Donora	
	John K. Tener Memorial Bridge (Charleroi-Monessen Bridge)	Lock Street	Monessen and North Charleroi	
	Charleroi Locks & Dam		Monessen and Charleroi	
	Speers Railroad Bridge	Wheeling and Lake Erie Railway	North Belle Vernon and Speers	
	Belle Vernon Bridge	I-70	North Belle Vernon and Speers	
Washington County–Fayette County
	West Brownsville Junction Bridge	Norfolk Southern Railway Monongahela Subdivision	Brownsville Twp and West Brownsville	
	Lane Bane Bridge	US 40	Brownsville and West Brownsville	
	Inter-County Bridge, Brownsville Bridge	Bridge Boulevard	Brownsville and West Brownsville	
	Maxwell Lock & Dam		Luzerne Twp and Centerville	
	Ronald C. "Smokey" Bakewell Memorial Bridge (Mon-Fayette Expressway Bridge)	PA Turnpike 43	Luzerne Twp and Centerville	
Greene County–Fayette County
	Masontown Bridge	PA 21	Masontown and Monongahela Twp	
	Grays Landing Lock & Dam		Nicholson Twp and Monongahela Twp	
	New Geneva Bridge	Norfolk Southern Railway Monongahela Subdivision	Nicholson Twp and Monongahela Twp	
	Albert Gallatin Memorial Bridge (Point Marion Bridge)	PA 88	Point Marion and Dunkard Twp	
	Point Marion Lock & Dam		Springhill Twp and Dunkard Twp	

== West Virginia ==
Image	Crossing	Carries	Location	Coordinates
Monongalia County
	Edith Barill Bridge (Star City Bridge)	US 19 / WV 7	Star City and Granville	39°39′28″N 79°59′32″W
	Westover Bridge	US 19 (Pleasant Street)	Morgantown and Westover	39°37′51″N 79°57′36″W
	Morgantown Lock and Dam		Morgantown and Westover	39°37′10″N 79°58′03″W
	Uffington Bridge	I-79	Uffington	39°35′17″N 79°58′45″W
	Hildebrand Lock and Dam		Hilderbrand	39°34′58″N 80°00′40″W
	Opekiska Lock and Dam		Lowsville	39°33′45″N 80°03′05″W
Marion County
	Prickett's Fort Bridge (abandoned)	former B&O Railroad line	Everettville	
	Fairmont Railroad Bridge	CSX Fairmont Subdivision	Fairmont	39°30′24″N 80°07′48″W
	Robert H. Mollohan-Jefferson St. Bridge (High Level Bridge)	CR 1973 (Jefferson Street)	Fairmont	39°28′57″N 80°08′26″W
	David Morgan Bridge (Third Street Bridge)	WV 310 (Merchant Street)	Fairmont	39°28′45″N 80°08′39″W
	Grafton Truss Bridge	CSX Fairmont Subdivision	Fairmont	
Monongahela River splits into West Fork River and Tygart Valley River

== See also ==
- List of crossings of the Ohio River
