= Opekiska Lock and Dam =

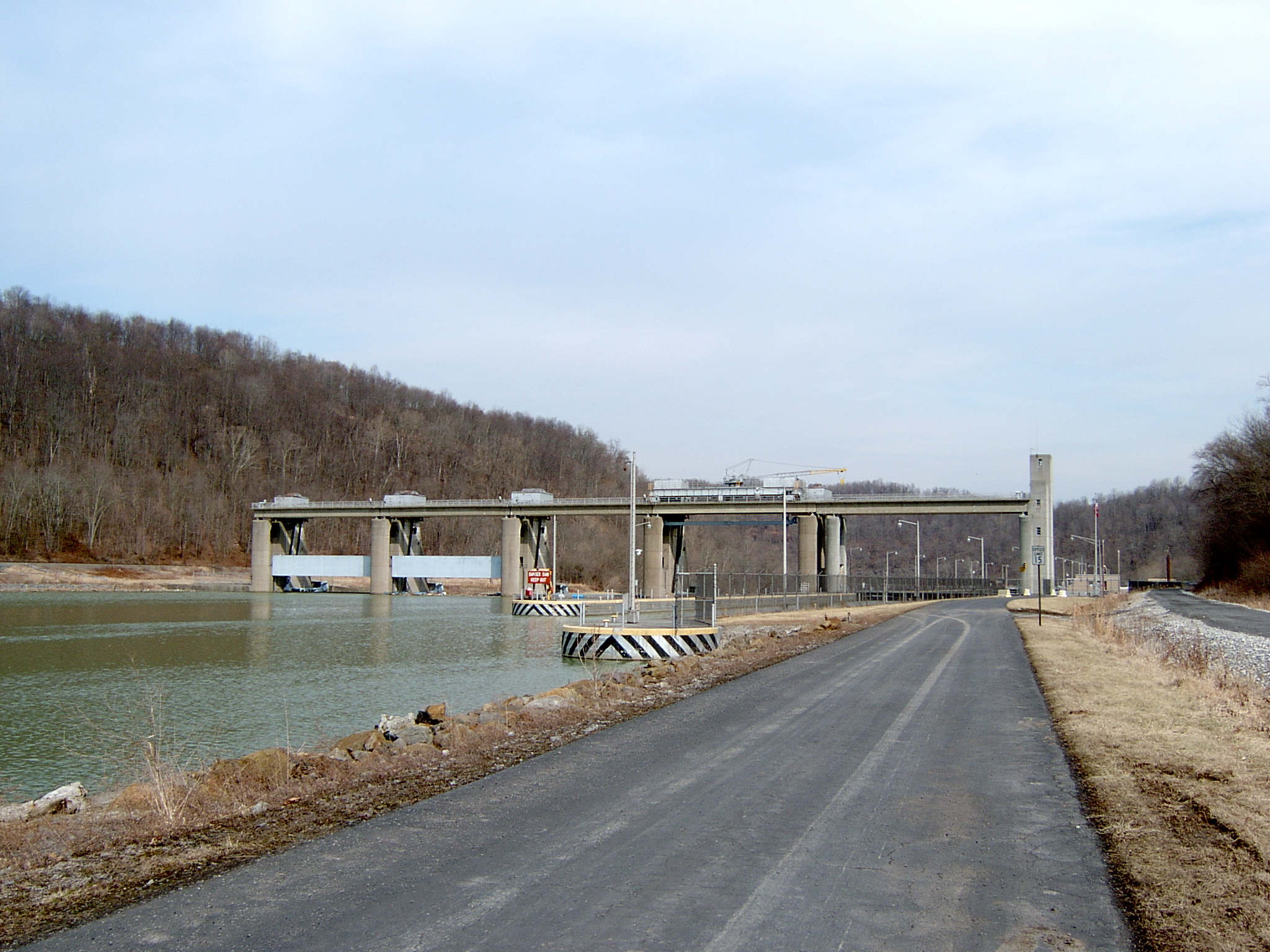
- Location: Monongalia County, West Virginia, USA
- Coordinates: 39°33′48″N 80°02′59″W
- Construction began: 1961
- Opening date: 1964
- Operator: U.S. Army Corps of Engineers, Pittsburgh District

Dam and spillways
- Impounds: Monongahela River

Opekiska Lock and Dam is a navigational lock and gated dam on the Monongahela River at Lowsville, West Virginia. It is part of a series of dams that canalizes the Monongahela to a depth of at least 9 feet (2.7 m) for its entire length from Fairmont, West Virginia to Pittsburgh, Pennsylvania. It is maintained by the U.S. Army Corps of Engineers' Pittsburgh District.

Opekiska has a single lock chamber located on the right-descending river bank. The dam's upper pool extends about 13 miles (21 km) upstream to the Monongahela's source at Fairmont, West Virginia. The pool also extends up the Monongahela's two primary tributaries, the Tygart Valley River and the West Fork River. Opekiska's 7.4-mile (11.9 km) downstream pool is formed by Hildebrand Lock and Dam.

== History ==
Construction on Opekiska Lock and Dam began in 1961 and was completed in 1964. It replaced old Locks 14 and 15, timber crib structures completed about 1903. Due to cost issues, it was closed to weekend traffic in October 2012. However, funding from the Upper Monongahela River Association began in 2015 to cover the costs of opening the locks during the summer months on weekends.

== See also ==
- List of crossings of the Monongahela River
