= New Geneva Bridge =

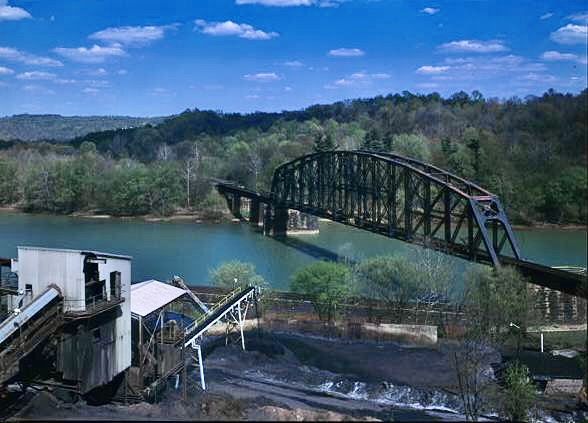
- Coordinates: 39°46′52″N 79°56′05″W
- Carries: Norfolk Southern Monongahela Subdivision
- Crosses: Monongahela River
- Locale: Nicholson Township and Monongahela Township, Pennsylvania

Characteristics
- Design: Truss bridge
- Total length: 950 feet (290 m)
- Longest span: 475 feet (145 m)

History
- Opened: 1912

The New Geneva Bridge is a truss bridge that carries the Norfolk Southern Railway across the Monongahela River between Nicholson Township and Monongahela Township, Pennsylvania. The bridge was originally built to serve the Monongahela Railroad; it has long been part of a heavily traveled coal route. At the time of construction, it was the largest bridge ever constructed using end launching. The structure is just upriver from Friendship Hill National Historic Site.

== See also ==
- List of bridges documented by the Historic American Engineering Record in Pennsylvania
- List of crossings of the Monongahela River
