= List of dam removals in Pennsylvania =

This is a list of dams in Pennsylvania that have been removed as physical impediments to free-flowing rivers or streams. According to data from American Rivers, Pennsylvania has seen the most dam removals of any state.

== Removals by watershed ==
=== Susquehanna River ===
The Susquehanna River is the primary watercourse in Central Pennsylvania. Over 130 dams have been removed from its watershed in the state.

The 16 ft (4.9 m) tall, 755 ft (230 m) long Oakland Dam is the only dam to have been removed from the Susquehanna River's main stem in the modern era. Completed in 2023, the $450,000 Oakland Dam removal is considered the largest dam removal project in Pennsylvania. The dam had not provided hydropower since the 1990s and was a safety hazard.

The Adam T. Bower Memorial Dam on the main stem Susquehanna is an inflatable dam that is present in the summer and "removed" during the off-season. Since the removals are not permanent, this dam remains a barrier and is not included in the below list.

==== Conodoguinet Creek ====
The 2018–2019 removal of the 83 ft (25 m) tall, 550 ft (170 m) long Gunter Valley Dam on Trout Run, a tributary of Conodoguinet Creek, was the tallest dam removal in Pennsylvania. The concrete and earthen dam had been built as part of the water supply system for Shippensburg, but suffered from seepage and was no longer needed. Its demolition served as a case study for dam safety engineers to learn about the effectiveness of the design and construction of this type of dam.

== Completed removals ==
Dam	Height	Year removed	Location	Watercourse	Watershed
Furnace Run Dam	19 ft (5.8 m)	2022	Ligonier; 40.2094°N 79.18°W	Furnace Run	Allegheny River
Kohut Pond Dam	12 ft (3.7 m)	2005	Ligonier; 40.2671°N 79.1289°W	Hess Run	Allegheny River
Rolling Rock Dams	3 ft (0.91 m)	2008	Ligonier; 40.1714°N 79.1926°W	Rolling Rock Creek	Allegheny River
Unnamed dam		2000	Ridgway; 41.4331°N 78.7363°W	Clarion River	Allegheny River
Bendigo State Park Dam	5 ft (1.5 m)	2010	Wilcox; 41.5278°N 78.6299°W	East Branch Clarion River	Allegheny River
Laurel Run Reservoir Dam	37 ft (11 m)	2001	St. Marys; 41.3827°N 78.552°W	Laurel Run	Allegheny River
West Leechburg Dam	45 ft (14 m)	2010	West Leechburg; 40.6407°N 79.6178°W	West Branch Penn Run	Allegheny River
Bear Rock Run Dam 1	30 ft (9.1 m)	2007	Johnstown; 40.4102°N 78.5836°W	Bear Rock Run	Allegheny River
Bear Rock Run Dam 2	30 ft (9.1 m)	2007	Johnstown; 40.4124°N 78.5846°W	Bear Rock Run	Allegheny River
Ben's Creek Intake Dam	6 ft (1.8 m)	2005	Lilly; 40.3955°N 78.614°W	Ben's Creek	Allegheny River
Clear Shade Creek Reservoir Dam	14 ft (4.3 m)	1998	Shade Township; 40.1497°N 78.7824°W	Clear Shade Creek	Allegheny River
Barr Slope Reservoir Dam	27 ft (8.2 m)	2009	Clymer; 40.7128°N 79.0073°W	Tributary to Dixon Run	Allegheny River
Findley Run Dam		2000	East Wheatfield Township; 40.4211°N 78.9723°W	Findley Run	Allegheny River
Altimus Dam		2008	Bolivar; 40.3617°N 79.137°W	Hendricks Creek	Allegheny River
Commodore Dam	16 ft (4.9 m)	2014	Commodore; 40.7131°N 78.9392°W	Hinty Run	Allegheny River
Manners Run Dam		2008	Johnstown; 40.2967°N 78.8933°W	Manners Run	Allegheny River
Lloydell Reservoir Dam	5 ft (1.5 m)	2005	Sidman; 40.3085°N 78.6852°W	South Fork Little Conemaugh River	Allegheny River
Boswell Dam	14 ft (4.3 m)	2012	Boswell; 40.1567°N 79.0264°W	Tributary to Quemahoning Creek	Allegheny River
SunRay Dam (Hospital Dam) and unnamed remnant	10 ft (3.0 m)	2014	North Warren; 41.8803°N 79.1402°W	Conewango Creek	Allegheny River
Carters Dam	6 ft (1.8 m)	2009	Warren; 41.8448°N 79.1396°W	Conewango Creek	Allegheny River
Conewango Dam		2009	Warren; 41.8445°N 79.1398°W	Conewango Creek	Allegheny River
Brown's Pond Dam		2024	Warren; 41.9549°N 79.2594°W	Mud Run	Allegheny River
Cross Dam	20 ft (6.1 m)	2013	Hayfield Township; 41.7392°N 80.1847°W	Brookhouser Creek	Allegheny River
Cussewago Dam	8 ft (2.4 m)	2023	Meadville; 41.6468°N 80.1682°W	Cussewago Creek	Allegheny River
SGL#69 Dam 13		2015	Guys Mills; 41.6354°N 79.8967°W	West Branch Sugar Creek	Allegheny River
Pittsburgh Cut Flower Lower Dam	17 ft (5.2 m)	2020	Allegheny; 40.6554°N 79.9833°W	Montour Run	Allegheny River
Pittsburgh Cut Flower Upper Dam	18 ft (5.5 m)	2020	Allegheny; 40.6574°N 79.9815°W	Montour Run	Allegheny River
Smethport Reservoir Dam	21 ft (6.4 m)	2009	Smethport; 41.8098°N 78.494°W	Blacksmith Run	Allegheny River
Firepond Dam	5 ft (1.5 m)	2016	Mead Township; 41.7983°N 79.1008°W	Dutchman Run	Allegheny River
War Dam	10 ft (3.0 m)	2011	Clarendon; 41.8179°N 79.1111°W	Morrison Run	Allegheny River
Old Skinner Dam	4 ft (1.2 m)	2013	Liberty Township; 41.7881°N 78.3183°W	Skinner Creek	Allegheny River
Sherwood Hollow Dam	10 ft (3.0 m)	2013	Liberty Township; 41.7931°N 78.3238°W	Skinner Creek	Allegheny River
Savan Dam		2010	Rochester Mills; 40.8205°N 78.9938°W	Little Mahoning Creek	Allegheny River
Johns Run Dam	4 ft (1.2 m)	2018	Heath Township; 41.344°N 79.0127°W	Johns Run	Allegheny River
Piffer Dam		2007	Franklin; 41.3754°N 79.929°W	Tributary to Little Sandy Creek	Allegheny River
Two Mile Run Dam	3 ft (0.91 m)	2014	Ludlow; 41.7201°N 78.9246°W	Two Mile Run	Allegheny River
Pulaski Mills Dam	8 ft (2.4 m)	2015	Pulaski Township; 41.1112°N 80.4369°W	Shenango River	Beaver River
Castleview Lower Dam	5 ft (1.5 m)	2013	Wampum; 41.0429°N 80.3563°W	Shenango River	Beaver River
Boydstown Dam	28 ft (8.5 m)	2009	Butler; 40.939°N 79.8428°W	Connoquenessing Creek	Beaver River
Collapsible Butler Dam		2009	Butler; 40.8548°N 79.8949°W	Connoquenessing Creek	Beaver River
Harmony Junction Dam	8.5 ft (2.6 m)	2009	Butler; 40.7971°N 80.1044°W	Connoquenessing Creek	Beaver River
Renfrew Dam (Glass Factory Dam)	10 ft (3.0 m)	2022	Renfrew; 40.807°N 79.9552°W	Connoquenessing Creek	Beaver River
Duck Pond Dam	6 ft (1.8 m)	2014	Portersville; 40.9693°N 80.0202°W	Muddy Run	Beaver River
Scholars Run Diversion Dam	5 ft (1.5 m)	2015	Zelienople; 40.8061°N 80.1333°W	Scholars Run	Beaver River
Fairless Murray Dam		2010	Ellwood City; 40.885°N 80.2307°W	Slippery Rock Creek	Beaver River
Slippery Rock-Wortemburg Pump Dam		2021	West Liberty; 40.858°N 80.2555°W	Slippery Rock Creek	Beaver River
Founders Hall Bridge Dam	4 ft (1.2 m)	2024	Butler; 41.0633°N 80.0416°W	Tributary to Slippery Rock Creek	Beaver River
Founders Hall Dam	4 ft (1.2 m)	2024	Butler; 41.064°N 80.0412°W	Tributary to Slippery Rock Creek	Beaver River
Gabion Dam	4 ft (1.2 m)	2024	Butler; 41.0651°N 80.0402°W	Tributary to Slippery Rock Creek	Beaver River
Rock Apartments Dam	4 ft (1.2 m)	2024	Butler; 41.0647°N 80.0404°W	Tributary to Slippery Rock Creek	Beaver River
Slippery Rock Dam	4 ft (1.2 m)	2024	Butler; 41.0616°N 80.0417°W	Tributary to Slippery Rock Creek	Beaver River
Stadium Drive Dam	4 ft (1.2 m)	2024	Butler; 41.0599°N 80.0419°W	Tributary to Slippery Rock Creek	Beaver River
Upper Grove City Dam	5.5 ft (1.7 m)	2004	Grove City; 41.1671°N 80.08°W	Wolf Creek	Beaver River
Main Street Dam	12 ft (3.7 m)	2005	Grove City; 41.1551°N 80.0852°W	Wolf Creek	Beaver River
Crystal Springs Dam			Parkesburg; 39.9318°N 75.9145°W	Birch Run	Christina River
Lenape Cabin Club Dam	3 ft (0.91 m)	2021	Pocopson Township; 39.9168°N 75.6371°W	Brandywine Creek	Christina River
Stroud Preserve Dam		2010	West Chester; 39.9485°N 75.6547°W	Tributary to East Branch Brandywine Creek	Christina River
Downing Ridge Dam	5.25 ft (1.60 m)	2018	Downingtown; 40.021°N 75.7063°W	East Branch Brandywine Creek	Christina River
Cupola Dam	8.5 ft (2.6 m)	2012	Honey Brook; 40.0983°N 75.8457°W	East Branch Brandywine Creek	Christina River
Lewis Mill Dam	8.5 ft (2.6 m)	2012	Honey Brook; 40.1008°N 75.8418°W	East Branch Brandywine Creek	Christina River
Nixon Park Dam	2 ft (0.61 m)	2021	Kennett Township; 39.852°N 75.7103°W	East Branch Red Clay Creek	Christina River
White Clay Creek #1		1938	London Grove; 39.8549°N 75.7844°W	East Branch White Clay Creek	Christina River
Unnamed dam	2.5 ft (0.76 m)	2008	Doylestown; 40.2657°N 75.1262°W	Tributary to Neshaminy Creek	Delaware River
Han Maum Dam		2014	Canadensis; 41.202°N 75.2562°W	Tributary to Leavitt Branch Broadhead Creek	Delaware River
Unnamed dam	6 ft (1.8 m)	1998		Tributary to Tinicum Creek	Delaware River
Ridge Dam		2022	Wayne; 41.5326°N 75.3362°W	Pond Brook	Delaware River
Red Shale Dam		2003	Hawley; 41.4814°N 75.2327°W	Red Shale Brook	Delaware River
Darby Borough Dam	6 ft (1.8 m)	2012	Darby; 39.9212°N 75.2671°W	Darby Creek	Delaware River
Kent Park Dam	10 ft (3.0 m)	2012	Drexel Hill; 39.9347°N 75.2883°W	Darby Creek	Delaware River
Hoffman Park Dam	4 ft (1.2 m)	2012	Lansdowne; 39.9319°N 75.2836°W	Darby Creek	Delaware River
Spring Dam		2005	Huntingdon Valley; 40.1221°N 75.0719°W	Pennypack Creek	Delaware River
Frankford Dam	10–15 ft (3.0–4.6 m)	2006	Philadelphia; 40.0448°N 75.0204°W	Pennypack Creek	Delaware River
Rhawn Street Dam		2006	Philadelphia; 40.0476°N 75.0331°W	Pennypack Creek	Delaware River
Lorimer Park Dam	5 ft (1.5 m)	2007	Philadelphia; 40.1129°N 75.0736°W	Pennypack Creek	Delaware River
Irving Mill Dam	12 ft (3.7 m)	2004	Chester; 39.8733°N 75.3584°W	Ridley Creek	Delaware River
Hershey's Mill Dam #2	6.8 ft (2.1 m)	2016	East Goshen Township; 40.0049°N 75.5695°W	Ridley Creek	Delaware River
Sharpless Dam	12 ft (3.7 m)	2005	Wallingford; 39.8721°N 75.3723°W	Ridley Creek	Delaware River
Okehocking Preserve Dam	5 ft (1.5 m)	2008	Willistown; 39.9682°N 75.484°W	Ridley Creek	Delaware River
Trexler Dam	15 ft (4.6 m)	2018	Lowhill Township; 40.6403°N 75.6258°W	Thicket Run	Delaware River
Summit Hill Dam	9 ft (2.7 m)	2015	Newtown Square; 40.0108°N 75.3885°W	Tributary to Darby Creek	Delaware River
Unnamed dam	10 ft (3.0 m)	2009	Aston; 39.8875°N 75.4439°W	West Branch Chester Creek	Delaware River
Unnamed Upper Dam	12 ft (3.7 m)	2010	Aston; 39.8845°N 75.4461°W	West Branch Chester Creek	Delaware River
Lakewood Retreat Dam		2007	East Stroudsburg; 41.0555°N 75.2239°W	Tributary to Brodhead Creek	Delaware River
Rakes Pond Dam	10 ft (3.0 m)	2012	Monroe County; 41.0564°N 75.1026°W	Pond Creek	Delaware River
Gorson Dam	11 ft (3.4 m)	2017	Dingmans Ferry; 41.1808°N 74.9346°W	Tributary to Delaware River	Delaware River
Ingham Creek Dam	24 ft (7.3 m)	2015	Solebury Township; 40.3541°N 74.989°W	Aquetong Creek	Delaware River
City of Easton Lower Dam (Recycling Center Dam)	10 ft (3.0 m)	2024	Easton; 40.6932°N 75.2165°W	Bushkill Creek	Delaware River
Lafayette College Dam	10 ft (3.0 m)	2023	Northampton County; 40.6971°N 75.2264°W	Bushkill Creek	Delaware River
Aluta Mill Road Dam	4 ft (1.2 m)	2021	Northampton County; 40.771°N 75.3138°W	Bushkill Creek	Delaware River
Crayola Dam (Water Power Dam)	10 ft (3.0 m)	2021	Palmer Township; 40.702°N 75.2425°W	Bushkill Creek	Delaware River
Bushkill Dam No. 3 (Silk Masters Dam)	4 ft (1.2 m)	2023	Easton; 40.6989°N 75.224°W	Bushkill Creek	Delaware River
Durham Dam	10 ft (3.0 m)	2004	Riegelsville; 40.5804°N 75.2°W	Cooks Creek	Delaware River
Stutz Dam	8 ft (2.4 m)	2023	Bucks County; 40.5591°N 75.1997°W	Tributary to Delaware River	Delaware River
Lake Poco Dam	13 ft (4.0 m)	2009	Mt. Bethel; 40.9095°N 75.1342°W	Tributary to Jacoby Creek	Delaware River
Lochner Dam	7 ft (2.1 m)	2006	Pipersville; 40.4579°N 75.083°W	Smithtown Creek	Delaware River
Ward Dam	8 ft (2.4 m)	2006	Pipersville; 40.4596°N 75.0796°W	Smithtown Creek	Delaware River
Ralph Stover Dam	5 ft (1.5 m)	2008	Pipersville; 40.4366°N 75.1003°W	Tohickon Creek	Delaware River
Haskins Dam	5 ft (1.5 m)	2019	Quakertown; 40.4417°N 75.27°W	Tohickon Creek	Delaware River
Wagners Dam		2018	Monroe County; 40.939°N 75.3929°W	McMichael Creek	Delaware River
Beaver Pond Dam	26 ft (7.9 m)	2016	Buckingham Township; 41.896°N 75.2961°W	Stockport Creek	Delaware River
Tyler Hill Dam	13 ft (4.0 m)	2017	Damascus Township; 41.6907°N 75.1134°W	Sunny Brook	Delaware River
Old Furnace Dam	8 ft (2.4 m)	2006	Orbisonia; 40.2371°N 77.8913°W	Black Log Creek	Juniata River
Unnamed dam	9 ft (2.7 m)	1998	Mifflin County; 40.6434°N 77.5787°W	Kishacoquillas Creek	Juniata River
Hackenberg Dam	4 ft (1.2 m)	2006	Lewistown; 40.557°N 77.6839°W	Strodes Run	Juniata River
Reedsville Milling Company Dam	14 ft (4.3 m)	2004	Burnham; 40.6671°N 77.5991°W	Tea Creek	Juniata River
Brush Mountain Dam	8 ft (2.4 m)	2024	Hollidaysburg; 40.4654°N 78.3638°W	Brush Creek	Juniata River
Kladder Dam	10 ft (3.0 m)	2014	Hollidaysburg; 40.39°N 78.3885°W	Frankstown Branch Juniata River	Juniata River
Williamsburg Station Dam	13 ft (4.0 m)	1996	Williamsburg; 40.4716°N 78.2082°W	Frankstown Branch Juniata River	Juniata River
Maple Hollow Reservoir Dam (Ducansville Reservoir)	22 ft (6.7 m)	1995	Duncansville; 40.4399°N 78.4868°W	Gillians Run	Juniata River
Rose Hill Intake Dam	12 ft (3.7 m)	1998	Altoona; 40.5159°N 78.3606°W	Kettle Creek	Juniata River
Wolf Mill Dam	5 ft (1.5 m)	2011	Tyrone; 40.6768°N 78.2013°W	Tributary to Logan Spring Run	Juniata River
Snare Run Reservoir Dam	22 ft (6.7 m)	2009	Williamsburg; 40.4727°N 78.1626°W	Snare Run	Juniata River
Unnamed dam	12 ft (3.7 m)	2015	Taylor Township; 40.3906°N 78.3865°W	Tributary to Frankstown Branch Juniata River	Juniata River
Trough Creek Dam	8 ft (2.4 m)	2013	Todd Township; 40.3322°N 78.1248°W	Great Trough Creek	Juniata River
Behrend Capped Waterfall Dam	2.5 ft (0.76 m)	2007	Erie; 42.1235°N 79.9969°W	Fourmile Creek	Lake Erie
Spring Creek Inc. Dam	2 ft (0.61 m)	2007	Erie; 42.1339°N 80.005°W	Fourmile Creek	Lake Erie
Glenwood Dam	3 ft (0.91 m)	2010	Erie; 42.0967°N 80.0753°W	Mill Creek	Lake Erie
Packerton Dam		2004	Lehighton; 40.845°N 75.7284°W	Beaver Run	Lehigh River
Cedar Creek Dam #1		2001	Allentown; 40.5773°N 75.5391°W	Cedar Creek	Lehigh River
Dorney Park Dam		2001	Allentown; 40.5791°N 75.5355°W	Cedar Creek	Lehigh River
Egypt Plant Dam		2015	Coplay; 40.673°N 75.5364°W	Coplay Creek	Lehigh River
Egypt Quarry Dam	4 ft (1.2 m)	2015	Coplay; 40.6775°N 75.5253°W	Coplay Creek	Lehigh River
Dilldown Creek Dam	6 ft (1.8 m)	2024	Tunkhannock Township; 41.0354°N 75.5435°W	Dilldown Creek	Lehigh River
Lower Saucon Sportsmens Association Dam	2 ft (0.61 m)	2010	Lower Saucon Township; 40.6013°N 75.3464°W	East Branch Saucon Creek	Lehigh River
Atlas Dam	12 ft (3.7 m)	2014	Northampton; 40.6882°N 75.4833°W	Hokendauqua Creek	Lehigh River
Unnamed dam	3 ft (0.91 m)	2009	Allentown; 40.6345°N 75.5323°W	Jordan Creek	Lehigh River
Jordan Park Dam	3.5 ft (1.1 m)	2013	Allentown; 40.6196°N 75.4765°W	Jordan Creek	Lehigh River
McArthur Road Dam	3 ft (0.91 m)	2013	Whitehall Township; 40.6234°N 75.4821°W	Jordan Creek	Lehigh River
Route 22 Dam	3 ft (0.91 m)	2013	Whitehall Township; 40.6246°N 75.4882°W	Jordan Creek	Lehigh River
Trexler Nature Preserve Dam		2015	Schnecksville; 40.6621°N 75.6262°W	Jordan Creek	Lehigh River
Helfrich Springs Dam	3 ft (0.91 m)	2013	Whitehall Township; 40.6276°N 75.489°W	Jordan Creek	Lehigh River
PGC Dam 1	6 ft (1.8 m)	2017	Lowhill Township; 40.6664°N 75.6677°W	Lehigh River	Lehigh River
PGC Dam 2	10 ft (3.0 m)	2017	Lowhill Township; 40.6591°N 75.6659°W	Lehigh River	Lehigh River
PGC Dam 3	5 ft (1.5 m)	2017	Lowhill Township; 40.6583°N 75.6656°W	Lehigh River	Lehigh River
Lower Klondike Dam	15 ft (4.6 m)	2019	Clifton Township / Lehigh Township; 41.2533°N 75.4505°W	Lehigh River	Lehigh River
Palmerton Dam	2.5 ft (0.76 m)	2006	Slatington; 40.7919°N 75.6356°W	Lehigh River	Lehigh River
Wild Lands Conservancy Dam	5 ft (1.5 m)	2000	Emmaus; 40.5416°N 75.5113°W	Little Lehigh Creek	Lehigh River
Robin Hood Bridge Dam	2.5 ft (0.76 m)	2013	Allentown; 40.5824°N 75.4833°W	Little Lehigh Creek	Lehigh River
Trout Hatchery Dam	3 ft (0.91 m)	2013	Allentown; 40.5625°N 75.5119°W	Little Lehigh Creek	Lehigh River
Heilman Dam	15 ft (4.6 m)	2007	Lehighton; 40.8245°N 75.7047°W	Mahoning Creek	Lehigh River
Bridle Path Dam	4 ft (1.2 m)	2016	Bethlehem; 40.6488°N 75.3798°W	Monocacy Creek	Lehigh River
Colonial Industrial Quarter Dam	6 ft (1.8 m)	2013	Bethlehem; 40.6217°N 75.3837°W	Monocacy Creek	Lehigh River
Archibald Johnston Conservation Area Dam 1	7 ft (2.1 m)	2024	Bethlehem; 40.6739°N 75.3542°W	Monocacy Creek	Lehigh River
Archibald Johnston Conservation Area Dam 2	4 ft (1.2 m)	2024	Bethlehem; 40.6731°N 75.3554°W	Monocacy Creek	Lehigh River
Archibald Johnston Conservation Area Dam 3	3 ft (0.91 m)	2024	Bethlehem; 40.6707°N 75.3586°W	Monocacy Creek	Lehigh River
Archibald Johnston Conservation Area Dam 4	5 ft (1.5 m)	2024	Bethlehem; 40.6706°N 75.3582°W	Monocacy Creek	Lehigh River
Archibald Johnston Conservation Area Dam 5	8 ft (2.4 m)	2024	Bethlehem; 40.6704°N 75.3582°W	Monocacy Creek	Lehigh River
Archibald Johnston Conservation Area Dam 6	4 ft (1.2 m)	2024	Bethlehem; 40.6707°N 75.3586°W	Monocacy Creek	Lehigh River
Thornhurst Country Club Dam	10 ft (3.0 m)	2011	Moscow; 41.2132°N 75.6136°W	Pond Creek	Lehigh River
Saucon Park Dam	4.5 ft (1.4 m)	2009	Bethlehem; 40.6012°N 75.3455°W	Saucon Creek	Lehigh River
Kulp Dam	3 ft (0.91 m)	2019	Northampton County; 40.5788°N 75.3453°W	Saucon Creek	Lehigh River
Maple Dam	3 ft (0.91 m)	2017	Long Pond; 41.0656°N 75.5214°W	Tunkhannock Creek	Lehigh River
Geigers Bridge Dam	4 ft (1.2 m)	2021	Lehigh County; 40.6451°N 75.6258°W	Tributary to Jordan Creek	Lehigh River
East Branch Saucon Dam	4 ft (1.2 m)	2017	Bethlehem; 40.6166°N 75.3321°W	East Branch Saucon Creek	Lehigh River
Millbrook Farms Dam	4.5 ft (1.4 m)	2017	Emmaus; 40.539°N 75.5322°W	Little Lehigh Creek	Lehigh River
Ellsworth No. 2 Dam	26 ft (7.9 m)	2011	Ellsworth; 40.1071°N 80.0247°W	Center Branch Pigeon Creek	Monongahela River
Crabapple Dam	30 ft (9.1 m)	2007	Star Junction; 40.0281°N 79.7705°W	Crabapple Run	Monongahela River
Pumping Station Dam	16 ft (4.9 m)	2010	Wayne; 39.728°N 80.2526°W	Dunkard Creek	Monongahela River
Monongahela Lock and Dam 3	16 ft (4.9 m)	2024	Elizabeth; 40.2651°N 79.9001°W	Monongahela River	Monongahela River
Graceland Dam	17 ft (5.2 m)	2006	Prosperity; 40.0221°N 80.326°W	Tributary to Neshannock River	Monongahela River
Gibson Pumping Station Dam		2015	Charleroi; 40.1447°N 79.9627°W	Tributary to Pigeon Creek	Monongahela River
Woodland Dam	3 ft (0.91 m)	2015	Sewickley; 40.559°N 80.1907°W	Little Sewickley Creek	Ohio River
Bald Knob Dam	65 ft (20 m)	2016	Findlay Township; 40.4544°N 80.3155°W	Potato Garden Run	Ohio River
Group Camp Dam	20 ft (6.1 m)	2024	Frankfort Springs; 40.5107°N 80.4405°W	Traverse Creek	Ohio River
Claysville School Street No. 1 Dam		2008	Washington; 40.1191°N 80.4163°W	Tributary to Dutch Fork	Ohio River
Birch Run Dam	60 ft (18 m)	2005	Fayetteville; 39.9183°N 77.455°W	Potomac River	Conococheague Creek
Scotland Pond Dams	4.5 ft (1.4 m)	2019	Greene Township; 39.9717°N 77.5875°W	Potomac River	Conococheague Creek
Siloam Dam		2005	Chambersburg; 39.9613°N 77.648°W	Potomac River	Conococheague Creek
Wolf Lake Dam		2006	Chambersburg; 39.9464°N 77.6604°W	Potomac River	Conococheague Creek
Nicodemus Dam		2010	Quincy Township; 39.7879°N 77.604°W	Potomac River	Tributary to West Branch Antietam Creek
Cove Valley Christian Camp Dam	5 ft (1.5 m)	2014	Mercersburg; 39.8405°N 77.9695°W	Potomac River	Little Cove Creek
Hinnershitz Settling Basin Dam	9 ft (2.7 m)	2016	Alsace Township; 40.368°N 75.8646°W	Antietam Creek	Schuylkill River
Mt. Penn #3 Dam		2004	Reading; 40.3435°N 75.8868°W	Tributary to Antietam Creek	Schuylkill River
Van Reed Paper Mill Dam	8 ft (2.4 m)	2022	Reading; 40.3652°N 75.9938°W	Cacoosing Creek	Schuylkill River
Croton Lake	15 ft (4.6 m)	2015	King of Prussia; 40.0672°N 75.3961°W	Crow Creek	Schuylkill River
Unnamed dam		2003	Collegeville; 40.1576°N 75.4641°W	Doe Run	Schuylkill River
Unnamed dam		2003	New Holland; 40.0002°N 76.11°W	Eshleman Run	Schuylkill River
Furnace Creek Dam	63 ft (19 m)	2014	Robesonia; 40.3304°N 76.1472°W	Furnace Creek (Spring Creek tributary)	Schuylkill River
Witman Dam		2010	Fleetwood; 40.4069°N 75.7892°W	Furnace Creek (Little Manatawny Creek tributary)	Schuylkill River
Unnamed Witman Dam	8.5 ft (2.6 m)	2010	Oley Township; 40.4062°N 75.7884°W	Furnace Creek (Little Manatawny Creek tributary)	Schuylkill River
Sumner Dam	16 ft (4.9 m)	2011	Conshohocken; 40.0693°N 75.3355°W	Gulph Creek	Schuylkill River
Mill Dam (Wernersville State Hospital Dam)	25 ft (7.6 m)	2019	Wernersville; 40.3286°N 76.1114°W	Hospital Creek	Schuylkill River
Delp Dam (Swartley Mill Dam; Keller Creamery Dam)		2018	Telford; 40.307°N 75.3771°W	Indian Creek	Schuylkill River
Dauberville Lake Dam		2007	Centre County; 40.4591°N 75.982°W	Irish Creek	Schuylkill River
Unnamed Girl Scout Dam	6 ft (1.8 m)	2007	Summerhill; 40.3854°N 75.5851°W	Laurel Run	Schuylkill River
Unnamed dam		2000	Pottstown; 40.2463°N 75.6565°W	Manatawny Creek	Schuylkill River
Rounick Pond Dam	6 ft (1.8 m)	2014	Bryn Mawr; 40.0398°N 75.3012°W	Tributary to Mill Creek	Schuylkill River
Gensamer Dam	4 ft (1.2 m)	2020	Bucks County; 40.2715°N 75.1878°W	Tributary to Neshaminy Creek	Schuylkill River
Collegeville Dam	6 ft (1.8 m)	2003	Collegeville; 40.1911°N 75.4493°W	Perkiomen Creek	Schuylkill River
East Greenville Dam (Perkiomen Creek Gage Dam)		2022	Montgomery; 40.3939°N 75.5158°W	Perkiomen Creek	Schuylkill River
Goodrich Dam	12 ft (3.7 m)	2005	Phoenixville; 40.1192°N 75.4581°W	Perkiomen Creek	Schuylkill River
Unnamed Nestle Dam	3 ft (0.91 m)	2007	Pottstown; 40.1981°N 75.6833°W	Tributary to Pigeon Creek	Schuylkill River
Twining Valley Golf Course Dam	15 ft (4.6 m)	2004	Dresher; 40.1393°N 75.1596°W	Tributary to Sandy Run	Schuylkill River
Ontelaunee Orchards Dam		2008	Leesport; 40.4577°N 75.9653°W	Tributary to Schuylkill River	Schuylkill River
Felix Dam		2007	Muhlenberg Township; 40.3913°N 75.9696°W	Schuylkill River	Schuylkill River
Plymouth Dam	8 ft (2.4 m)	2009	Norristown; 40.075°N 75.3157°W	Schuylkill River	Schuylkill River
Vincent Dam	7 ft (2.1 m)	2009	Royersford; 40.2056°N 75.5649°W	Schuylkill River	Schuylkill River
Norristown Farm Park Dam	8 ft (2.4 m)	2011	Norristown; 40.1386°N 75.3465°W	Stony Creek	Schuylkill River
Calvert Hurdle Park Dam		2004	Lansdale; 40.1562°N 75.3259°W	Tributary to Stony Creek	Schuylkill River
Charming Forge Dam	7 ft (2.1 m)	2004	Robesonia; 40.3874°N 76.1713°W	Tulpehocken Creek	Schuylkill River
Dunn Dam		2015	Fort Washington	Tributary to Sandy Run	Schuylkill River
Acheys Mill Dam		2011	Reading; 40.4377°N 75.9589°W	Unami Creek	Schuylkill River
Fairway #7 Pond	2 ft (0.61 m)	2015	Malvern; 40.0396°N 75.5649°W	Tributary to Valley Creek	Schuylkill River
Lorimer Reserve Upper Pond Dam	10 ft (3.0 m)	2024	Chester; 40.0707°N 75.4898°W	Tributary to Valley Creek	Schuylkill River
Valley Creek #1		1920	Valley Forge; 40.1009°N 75.4616°W	Valley Creek	Schuylkill River
Hillegas Dam		2022	Montgomery; 40.3737°N 75.523°W	West Branch Perkiomen Creek	Schuylkill River
Willow Creek Dam	10 ft (3.0 m)	2023	Berks County; 40.4271°N 75.9393°W	Willow Creek	Schuylkill River
Plymouth Crossing Dam	5 ft (1.5 m)	2011	Lower Gwynedd Township; 40.1871°N 75.2558°W	Wissahickon Creek	Schuylkill River
Mohnton Water Supply Dam		2006	Mohnton; 40.2822°N 75.9921°W	Wyomissing Creek	Schuylkill River
Mirror Lake Dam		2004	West Reading; 40.3277°N 75.9499°W	Wyomissing Creek	Schuylkill River
Reading Museum Dam #1	3 ft (0.91 m)	2004	West Reading; 40.3283°N 75.9521°W	Wyomissing Creek	Schuylkill River
Reading Museum Dam #2	8 ft (2.4 m)	2004	Wyomissing; 40.3282°N 75.9536°W	Wyomissing Creek	Schuylkill River
Binky Lee Preserve Dam	8 ft (2.4 m)	2005	Malvern; 40.0971°N 75.6043°W	Tributary to Pickering Creek	Schuylkill River
Shissler Dam		2006	York Haven; 40.122°N 76.8167°W	Tributary to Bennett Run	Susquehanna River
Big Spring Run Dam #1		1916	Willow Street; 39.9986°N 76.265°W	Big Spring Run	Susquehanna River
Krady Mill Dam	5 ft (1.5 m)	2018	Columbia; 40.0683°N 76.4987°W	Chiques Creek	Susquehanna River
Snavely's Mill Dam	3 ft (0.91 m)	1997	Manheim; 40.132°N 76.4054°W	Chiques Creek	Susquehanna River
Heistand Sawmill Dam	15 ft (4.6 m)	2015	Marietta; 40.0552°N 76.5269°W	Chiques Creek	Susquehanna River
Martins Dam		2000	Ephrata; 40.1941°N 76.1642°W	Cocalico Creek	Susquehanna River
Bascule Gate Dam	6 ft (1.8 m)	2024	York; 39.9629°N 76.7332°W	Codorus Creek	Susquehanna River
Yorkane Dam		1997		Tributary to Codorus Creek	Susquehanna River
Henry Eby Dam		2000	Ephrata; 40.1533°N 76.1275°W	Conestoga River	Susquehanna River
Hinkletown Mill Dam		2000	Ephrata; 40.1531°N 76.1282°W	Conestoga River	Susquehanna River
Zimmerman Dam	4 ft (1.2 m)	2010	Ephrata; 40.1533°N 76.1275°W	Conestoga River	Susquehanna River
American Paper Products Dam	4 ft (1.2 m)	1998	Lancaster County; 40.0791°N 76.2596°W	Conestoga River	Susquehanna River
Rock Hill Dam	13 ft (4.0 m)	1999	Millersville; 39.9629°N 76.3653°W	Conestoga River	Susquehanna River
Hellberg's Dam		1999	West Earl Township; 40.1296°N 76.197°W	Conestoga River	Susquehanna River
Detter's Mill Dam	7 ft (2.1 m)	2004	Dover; 40.0141°N 76.9263°W	Conewago Creek	Susquehanna River
Sharrer's Mill Dam	6.5 ft (2.0 m)	2005	New Oxford; 39.9064°N 77.1008°W	Conewago Creek	Susquehanna River
Masonic Home Dam		2008	Elizabethtown; 40.1326°N 76.6214°W	Conoy Creek	Susquehanna River
Dugan Run Dam	8 ft (2.4 m)	2017	Wrightsville; 40.0439°N 76.5913°W	Dugan Run	Susquehanna River
Smucker Dam	3.5 ft (1.1 m)	2010	Earl Township; 40.0716°N 76.0864°W	Groff Run	Susquehanna River
Vance Dam	7 ft (2.1 m)	2023	Lancaster; 40.1699°N 76.1738°W	Gross Run	Susquehanna River
Rexmont Dam #1		2001	Lebanon; 40.2793°N 76.3578°W	Hammer Creek	Susquehanna River
Hammer Creek Dam	8 ft (2.4 m)	2001	Lititz; 40.2422°N 76.3361°W	Hammer Creek	Susquehanna River
Rexmont Dam #2		2002	South Lebanon Township; 40.2772°N 76.3584°W	Tributary to Hammer Creek	Susquehanna River
Unnamed Dam #1		2001	Kinzers; 40.0114°N 76.0624°W	Houston Run	Susquehanna River
Kehm Run Dam	27 ft (8.2 m)	2021	York; 39.9233°N 76.6677°W	Kehm Run	Susquehanna River
Mill Port Conservancy Dam	10 ft (3.0 m)	1998	Leola; 40.1376°N 76.2583°W	Lititz Run	Susquehanna River
Old Withers Dam		2008	Leola; 40.1139°N 76.2482°W	Lititz Run	Susquehanna River
Young's Dam	3 ft (0.91 m)	2002	Lititz; 40.1466°N 76.278°W	Lititz Run	Susquehanna River
Unnamed dam	4 ft (1.2 m)	1998		Lititz Run	Susquehanna River
Mount Joy Waterworks Dam	4 ft (1.2 m)	2019	Mount Joy; 40.1202°N 76.5003°W	Little Chiques Creek	Susquehanna River
Mount Joy Dam (SICO Dam)	4 ft (1.2 m)	2014	Mount Joy; 40.1103°N 76.4915°W	Little Chiques Creek	Susquehanna River
Denlinger's Mill Dam	6 ft (1.8 m)	1930	Millersville; 39.974°N 76.3757°W	Little Conestoga Creek	Susquehanna River
Maple Grove Dam	6 ft (1.8 m)	1997		Little Conestoga Creek	Susquehanna River
East Petersburg Authority Dam	4 ft (1.2 m)	1998		Little Conestoga Creek	Susquehanna River
Derry Run Basin C Dam	8 ft (2.4 m)	2014	West Manchester Township; 39.967°N 76.8061°W	Tributary to Little Conewago Creek	Susquehanna River
Daniel Esh Dam	2 ft (0.61 m)	2003	Lancaster; 40.0099°N 76.2772°W	Mill Creek (Conestoga River tributary)	Susquehanna River
Yorktowne Paper Dam	5 ft (1.5 m)	1997	York; 39.9826°N 76.7222°W	Mill Creek (Codorus Creek tributary)	Susquehanna River
Eaton-Dikeman Dam		1985	Mount Holly Springs; 40.1015°N 77.1835°W	Mountain Creek	Susquehanna River
Castle Fin Dam	5 ft (1.5 m)	1997	York County; 39.7667°N 76.3266°W	Muddy Creek	Susquehanna River
Garthridge Dam		1933	Peach Bottom Township; 39.7554°N 76.3415°W	Muddy Creek	Susquehanna River
Highrock Dam		1972	Peach Bottom Township; 39.761°N 76.3328°W	Muddy Creek	Susquehanna River
Amish Dam #1		2000	Ephrata; 40.1613°N 76.1083°W	Muddy Creek	Susquehanna River
Amish Dam #2		2000	Ephrata; 40.1648°N 76.11°W	Muddy Creek	Susquehanna River
Amish Dam #3		2000	Ephrata; 40.1724°N 76.1047°W	Muddy Creek	Susquehanna River
Amish Dam #4		2000	New Holland; 40.1745°N 76.0794°W	Muddy Creek	Susquehanna River
Amish Dam #5		2001	New Holland; 40.1752°N 76.0767°W	Muddy Creek	Susquehanna River
Amish Dam #6		2001	New Holland; 40.1786°N 76.0702°W	Muddy Creek	Susquehanna River
Amish Dam #7		2001	Denver; 40.1794°N 76.0688°W	Muddy Creek	Susquehanna River
Amish Dam #8		2001	Denver; 40.1781°N 76.0503°W	Muddy Creek	Susquehanna River
Beiler Dam	2.5 ft (0.76 m)	2007	Leacock Township; 40.0573°N 76.0908°W	Tributary to Muddy Run	Susquehanna River
Beiler Farm Dam	3 ft (0.91 m)	2024	Leacock Township; 40.0547°N 76.1012°W	Tributary to Muddy Run	Susquehanna River
James Ford's Dam	5 ft (1.5 m)	2006	Gordonville; 40.0127°N 76.1289°W	Pequea Creek	Susquehanna River
Unnamed Dam #2		2001	Paradise; 40.0109°N 76.0964°W	Pequea Creek	Susquehanna River
Fisher Dam	2 ft (0.61 m)	2010	Salisbury Township; 40.0201°N 75.9843°W	Pequea Creek	Susquehanna River
Muren's Dam (Seitzville Mill Dam)	12 ft (3.7 m)	2000	Seven Valleys; 39.8293°N 76.7619°W	South Branch Codorus Creek	Susquehanna River
Lower Crest Dam	2 ft (0.61 m)	2023	Dauphin	Spring Creek	Susquehanna River
Lake Lehman Dam	52 ft (16 m)	2015	Spring Grove; 39.8627°N 76.8612°W	Tributary to Codorus Creek	Susquehanna River
Wildcat Run Dam	14 ft (4.3 m)	2017	Wrightsville; 40.0479°N 76.6022°W	Wildcat Run	Susquehanna River
Unnamed dam		2003	Beaver Springs; 40.751°N 77.2123°W	Beaver Creek	Susquehanna River
Kehly Run Dam No. 2	16 ft (4.9 m)	2007	Shenandoah; 40.8307°N 76.1947°W	Kehly Run	Susquehanna River
Kehly Run Dam No. 3	33 ft (10 m)	2007	Shenandoah; 40.8313°N 76.1946°W	Kehly Run	Susquehanna River
Kehly Run Dam No. 4	20 ft (6.1 m)	2007	Shenandoah; 40.837°N 76.1985°W	Kehly Run	Susquehanna River
Kehly Run Dam No. 5	25 ft (7.6 m)	2007	Shenandoah; 40.8378°N 76.1992°W	Kehly Run	Susquehanna River
Kehly Run Dam No. 6	20 ft (6.1 m)	2007	Shenandoah; 40.8395°N 76.2009°W	Kehly Run	Susquehanna River
Mussers Dam	31 ft (9.4 m)	1992	Snyder County; 40.7672°N 76.8726°W	Middle Creek	Susquehanna River
Franklin Mill Dam		2000	Middleburg; 40.7843°N 77.046°W	Middle Creek	Susquehanna River
Millmont Dam		2006	Millmont; 40.8795°N 77.1342°W	Penns Creek	Susquehanna River
Penns Creek Dam #1		1968	Spring Mills; 40.8476°N 77.5597°W	Penns Creek	Susquehanna River
Shiffer's Mill Dam		2004	Elizabethville; 40.5445°N 76.8649°W	Wiconisco Creek	Susquehanna River
Adams Run Dam	9 ft (2.7 m)	2015	Dauphin County; 40.5864°N 76.4024°W	Adams Run	Susquehanna River
Black Creek Intake Dam	20 ft (6.1 m)	2011	Dauphin County; 40.6056°N 76.3756°W	Black Creek	Susquehanna River
Black Creek Middle Dam	10 ft (3.0 m)	2011	Dauphin County; 40.6223°N 76.3247°W	Black Creek	Susquehanna River
Cleversburg Water Supply Dam	4 ft (1.2 m)	2004	Shippensburg; 40.0101°N 77.462°W	Burd Run	Susquehanna River
Unnamed dam	3 ft (0.91 m)	2007	Camp Hill; 40.2283°N 76.9201°W	Tributary to Cedar Run	Susquehanna River
Smith Dam	3 ft (0.91 m)	2007	Camp Hill; 40.2258°N 76.9298°W	Tributary to Cedar Run	Susquehanna River
Detweiler Park Dam	8 ft (2.4 m)	2024	Dauphin; 40.3914°N 76.9377°W	Tributary to Clark Creek	Susquehanna River
Laurel Park Dam	16 ft (4.9 m)	2015	Mount Gretna; 40.2564°N 76.465°W	Conewago Creek	Susquehanna River
Good Hope Mill Dam	8 ft (2.4 m)	2001	Hampden Township; 40.2625°N 76.9788°W	Conodoguinet Creek	Susquehanna River
Orr's Bridge Dam		2019	Hampden Township; 40.2399°N 76.9519°W	Conodoguinet Creek	Susquehanna River
Black Dam	10 ft (3.0 m)	2003	Newville; 40.1941°N 77.3719°W	Conodoguinet Creek	Susquehanna River
Mixel Dam	7 ft (2.1 m)	2008	Newville; 40.1999°N 77.4179°W	Doubling Gap Creek	Susquehanna River
Goldsboro Dam	4 ft (1.2 m)	2005	Etters; 40.1527°N 76.7548°W	Fishing Creek (York County)	Susquehanna River
Stony Point Dam		2003	Franklin County; 39.9879°N 77.5007°W	Furnace Run	Susquehanna River
Shoops Dam		2010	Shippensburg; 40.0811°N 77.5421°W	Middle Spring Creek	Susquehanna River
Lower Poplar Run Reservoir Dam	10–12 ft (3.0–3.7 m)	2004	Dauphin County; 40.6242°N 76.4°W	Poplar Run	Susquehanna River
Upper Poplar Run Reservoir Dam	10–12 ft (3.0–3.7 m)	2004	Dauphin County; 40.6228°N 76.4028°W	Poplar Run	Susquehanna River
Crest Dam	4 ft (1.2 m)	2023	Dauphin; 40.2864°N 76.6345°W	Spring Creek	Susquehanna River
Homestead Dam	3 ft (0.91 m)	2023	Dauphin County; 40.271°N 76.6182°W	Spring Creek	Susquehanna River
Red Oak Dam	2 ft (0.61 m)	2023	Dauphin County; 40.2849°N 76.6321°W	Spring Creek	Susquehanna River
Hershey School Intake Dam	5.5 ft (1.7 m)	2014	Hershey; 40.2748°N 76.6217°W	Spring Creek	Susquehanna River
Upper Brooke Drive Dam	4 ft (1.2 m)	2023	Dauphin County; 40.2801°N 76.635°W	Tributary to Spring Creek	Susquehanna River
Iron Stone Mine Dam	4 ft (1.2 m)	2006	Middletown; 40.2061°N 76.7145°W	Swatara Creek	Susquehanna River
Bullfrog Valley Sediment Pond #1 Dam		2011	Derry Township; 40.2574°N 76.6848°W	Tributary to Swatara Creek	Susquehanna River
Bullfrog Valley Sediment Pond #2 Dam		2011	Derry Township; 40.2572°N 76.6846°W	Tributary to Swatara Creek	Susquehanna River
Camp Michaux Lower Dam	4.5 ft (1.4 m)	2017	Cumberland County; 40.0366°N 77.3416°W	Toms Run	Susquehanna River
Silver Spring Dam	9 ft (2.7 m)	2006	Mechanicsburg; 40.252°N 77.0073°W	Trindle Spring Run	Susquehanna River
Gunter Valley Dam	83 ft (25 m)	2019	Shippensburg; 40.1376°N 77.6722°W	Trout Run	Susquehanna River
Westinghouse Dam, Trafford Dam	6 ft (1.8 m)	2012	Trafford; 40.37°N 76.6142°W	Turtle Creek	Susquehanna River
Lemoyne Borough Dam	4 ft (1.2 m)	2019	Lemoyne; 40.2507°N 76.9096°W	Tributary to Susquehanna River	Susquehanna River
Meisers Mill Dam	5 ft (1.5 m)	2001	Mount Pleasant Mills; 40.6482°N 76.359°W	West Branch Mahantango Creek	Susquehanna River
Unnamed Left Mill Race Dam	4 ft (1.2 m)	2011	Mechanicsburg; 40.1491°N 77.0121°W	Tributary to Yellow Breeches Creek	Susquehanna River
Unnamed Right Mill Race Dam	4 ft (1.2 m)	2011	Mechanicsburg; 40.1491°N 77.0121°W	Tributary to Yellow Breeches Creek	Susquehanna River
Rosegarden Dam	4 ft (1.2 m)	2011	Dillsburg; 40.1484°N 77.0126°W	Yellow Breeches Creek	Susquehanna River
Spanglers Mill Dam	8 ft (2.4 m)	2008	Camp Hill; 40.2121°N 76.9069°W	Yellow Breeches Creek	Susquehanna River
Barnitz Mill Dam		2000	Carlisle; 40.1234°N 77.2213°W	Yellow Breeches Creek	Susquehanna River
Hoffman Dam	8 ft (2.4 m)	2005	Mechanicsburg; 40.1659°N 76.9085°W	Yellow Breeches Creek	Susquehanna River
Green Lane Dam	9 ft (2.7 m)	2009	New Cumberland; 40.2241°N 76.8987°W	Yellow Breeches Creek	Susquehanna River
Wittlinger Dam	8 ft (2.4 m)	2007	South Middleton Township; 40.1406°N 77.1273°W	Yellow Breeches Creek	Susquehanna River
Taylor Run Dam	6 ft (1.8 m)	2015	Blossburg; 41.6453°N 77.045°W	Taylor Run	Susquehanna River
Oakland Dam	16 ft (4.9 m)	2023	Susquehanna; 41.9436°N 75.6171°W	Susquehanna River	Susquehanna River
Solomons Creek Dam	6 ft (1.8 m)	2017	Ashley; 41.2082°N 75.9002°W	Solomons Creek	Susquehanna River
Diverting Dam	8 ft (2.4 m)		Plymouth; 41.2421°N 75.9714°W	Coal Creek	Susquehanna River
Coal Creek Dam #2	23 ft (7.0 m)	1995	Plymouth; 41.2421°N 75.9713°W	Coal Creek	Susquehanna River
Coal Creek Dam #3	24 ft (7.3 m)	1995	Plymouth; 41.2442°N 75.9737°W	Coal Creek	Susquehanna River
Coal Creek Dam #4	14 ft (4.3 m)	1995	Plymouth; 41.2511°N 75.9745°W	Coal Creek	Susquehanna River
Deep Hollow Creek Dam		2002	Pittston; 41.2582°N 75.7923°W	Deep Hollow Creek	Susquehanna River
Hanover Dam	12 ft (3.7 m)	2023	Luzerne; 41.1775°N 75.9885°W	Tributary to Espy Run	Susquehanna River
Unnamed PennDOT Dam	5 ft (1.5 m)	2007	Columbia County; 41.0306°N 76.4452°W	Fishing Creek (North Branch Susquehanna River tributary)	Susquehanna River
Olyphant #1 Dam	20 ft (6.1 m)	2016	Blakely; 41.4639°N 75.5382°W	Grassy Island Creek	Susquehanna River
Hillside Farms Dam		2024	Shavertown; 41.2978°N 75.9344°W	Huntsville Creek	Susquehanna River
Laurel Run Dam No. 2	37 ft (11 m)	2023	Plains Township; 41.2481°N 75.8175°W	Laurel Run	Susquehanna River
Geises Dam	5 ft (1.5 m)	2009	Northumberland; 40.9298°N 76.7646°W	Lithia Springs Creek	Susquehanna River
Valley View Dam	20 ft (6.1 m)	2012	Greenwood Township; 41.1178°N 76.5171°W	Little Fishing Creek	Susquehanna River
Intake Dam	8 ft (2.4 m)	2009	Shickshinny; 41.15°N 76.1692°W	Little Shickshinny Creek	Susquehanna River
Service Water Dam	10 ft (3.0 m)	2009	Danville; 40.9689°N 76.6172°W	Mahoning Creek	Susquehanna River
Waymart No. 7 Dam	13 ft (4.0 m)	2024	Wayne; 41.5823°N 75.4548°W	Tributary to Racket Brook	Susquehanna River
Intake Dam	8 ft (2.4 m)	2001	Manheim; 40.1668°N 76.4065°W	Rife Run	Susquehanna River
Hollister Dam (Dry Dam)		2022	Covington Township; 41.313°N 75.4953°W	Roaring Brook	Susquehanna River
Rush Brook Dam	19 ft (5.8 m)	2010	Carbondale; 41.5493°N 75.5652°W	Rush Brook	Susquehanna River
O'Conner Reservoir Dam	30 ft (9.1 m)	2021	Jessup; 41.453°N 75.5457°W	Sterry Creek	Susquehanna River
Wanamie Dam	26 ft (7.9 m)	2007	Newport; 41.1666°N 76.0243°W	Wanamie Run	Susquehanna River
Glenburn Pond Dam	16 ft (4.9 m)	2024	Glenburn Township; 41.5177°N 75.7267°W	Ackerly Creek	Susquehanna River
Mountain Springs Dam 2	18 ft (5.5 m)	2017	Sweet Valley; 41.3393°N 76.2263°W	South Branch Bowman Creek	Susquehanna River
Dundaff Dam	7 ft (2.1 m)	2010	Clifford Township; 41.635°N 75.5733°W	Dundaff Creek	Susquehanna River
Water Supply Dam	9 ft (2.7 m)	2015	Meshoppen; 41.6335°N 76.0535°W	Little Meshoppen Creek	Susquehanna River
Pomeroy Memorial Dam	24 ft (7.3 m)	1996	Troy; 41.7867°N 76.8214°W	West Branch Sugar Creek	Susquehanna River
Galeton Dam #2		2013	Galeton; 41.7487°N 77.7377°W	Right Branch Wetmore Run	West Branch Susquehanna River
Right Branch Dam	4.5 ft (1.4 m)	2013	Galeton; 41.7198°N 77.7078°W	Right Branch Wetmore Run	West Branch Susquehanna River
Galeton Dam #1		2013	Galeton; 41.7428°N 77.7439°W	Wetmore Run	West Branch Susquehanna River
Wetmore Run Dam	7 ft (2.1 m)	2013	Galeton; 41.7161°N 77.7144°W	Wetmore Run	West Branch Susquehanna River
Picric Dam	4 ft (1.2 m)	2014	Emporium; 41.5187°N 78.2563°W	Driftwood Branch Sinnemahoning Creek	West Branch Susquehanna River
Cherry Run Dam		2015	Weedville; 41.2631°N 78.5203°W	Tributary to Cherry Run	West Branch Susquehanna River
Axe Factory Dam		2009	Mill Hall; 41.0942°N 77.479°W	Fishing Creek (Bald Eagle Creek tributary)	West Branch Susquehanna River
Long Run Dam	7.5 ft (2.3 m)	2016	Greene Township; 41.0642°N 77.3553°W	Long Run	West Branch Susquehanna River
Mussers Garp Dam	6 ft (1.8 m)	2010	Centre County; 40.7429°N 77.8444°W	Tributary to Slab Cabin Run	West Branch Susquehanna River
Benner Springs Dam	2 ft (0.61 m)	2024	Bellefonte; 40.8512°N 77.8218°W	Spring Creek	West Branch Susquehanna River
Upper Spring Creek Dam (Rock Dam)	3 ft (0.91 m)	2024	Bellefonte; 40.8689°N 77.7953°W	Spring Creek	West Branch Susquehanna River
Cabin Hill Dam		1998	Milesburg; 40.9397°N 77.7883°W	Spring Creek	West Branch Susquehanna River
McCoy-Linn Dam	25 ft (7.6 m)	2007	Milesburg; 40.931°N 77.7853°W	Spring Creek	West Branch Susquehanna River
Unnamed dam	4.5 ft (1.4 m)	2005	Howard; 40.9795°N 77.7581°W	Wallace Run	West Branch Susquehanna River
Washburn Run Dam	5 ft (1.5 m)	2014	Loganton; 41.0572°N 77.3499°W	Washburn Run	West Branch Susquehanna River
Welfare Dam		2000	Renovo; 41.3353°N 77.7289°W	Paddy Run	West Branch Susquehanna River
Unnamed Glade Run Dam	3 ft (0.91 m)	2007	Muncy; 41.1708°N 76.7718°W	Tributary to Glade Run	West Branch Susquehanna River
Bailey Dam		2007	New Berlin; 40.9112°N 76.9627°W	Tributary to Turtle Creek	West Branch Susquehanna River
Big Run Park Dam	2 ft (0.61 m)	2013	Graham Township; 41.0445°N 78.2195°W	Big Run	West Branch Susquehanna River
Big Brown Dam	37 ft (11 m)	2010	Barr Township; 40.6173°N 78.7811°W	Browns Run	West Branch Susquehanna River
Eckenrode Mills Dam	5 ft (1.5 m)	2017	East Carroll Township; 40.599°N 78.6521°W	Chest Creek	West Branch Susquehanna River
Unnamed dam	2 ft (0.61 m)	2023	Patton; 40.6292°N 78.6478°W	Chest Creek	West Branch Susquehanna River
Patton Dam	12 ft (3.7 m)	2019	Patton; 40.6295°N 78.6478°W	Chest Creek	West Branch Susquehanna River
Cold Stream Dam	6 ft (1.8 m)	2019	Centre County; 40.8517°N 78.2068°W	Cold Stream	West Branch Susquehanna River
Duck Marsh Pond 26	8 ft (2.4 m)	2015	Girard Township; 41.2346°N 78.3261°W	Tributary to Mosquito Creek	West Branch Susquehanna River
Duck Marsh Pond No. 26 Dam	10 ft (3.0 m)	2014	Girard Township; 41.2348°N 78.3266°W	Tributary to Mosquito Creek	West Branch Susquehanna River
Duck Marsh Pond No. 27 Dam	8 ft (2.4 m)	2014	Girard Township; 41.2333°N 78.3325°W	Tributary to Mosquito Creek	West Branch Susquehanna River
Berwinsdale Dam	7 ft (2.1 m)	2007	Irvona; 40.8176°N 78.5998°W	North Witmer Run	West Branch Susquehanna River
Dayton Dam	6 ft (1.8 m)	2010	Centre County; 40.8617°N 78.1161°W	Sixmile Run	West Branch Susquehanna River
Lower Trout Run Dam (Montola Dam)	8.5 ft (2.6 m)	2019	Centre County; 40.8084°N 78.2613°W	Trout Run	West Branch Susquehanna River
Middle Trout Run Dam	2.5 ft (0.76 m)	2019	Centre County; 40.8047°N 78.2669°W	Trout Run	West Branch Susquehanna River
Upper Trout Run Dam	4 ft (1.2 m)	2019	Centre County; 40.8041°N 78.2677°W	Trout Run	West Branch Susquehanna River
Garmantown Dam	3 ft (0.91 m)	2019	Cambria County; 40.6809°N 78.8075°W	West Branch Susquehanna River	West Branch Susquehanna River
Bear Run Lower Dam	9 ft (2.7 m)	2008	Stewart Township; 39.8992°N 79.4582°W	Bear Run	Youghiogheny River
Bear Run Upper Dam	5 ft (1.5 m)	2008	Stewart Township; 39.8991°N 79.4587°W	Bear Run	Youghiogheny River
Bigby Dam	25 ft (7.6 m)	2011	Garrett; 39.8593°N 79.0747°W	Bigby Run	Youghiogheny River
Dunbar #1	16 ft (4.9 m)	2018	Dunbar Township; 39.9534°N 79.5787°W	Dunbar Creek	Youghiogheny River
Dunbar #4 Dam	14 ft (4.3 m)	2016	Dunbar Township; 39.9534°N 79.5787°W	Dunbar Creek	Youghiogheny River
Dunbar 2 Dam	12 ft (3.7 m)	2017	Dunbar; 39.949°N 79.5786°W	Dunbar Creek	Youghiogheny River
Dunbar 3 Dam	12 ft (3.7 m)	2017	Dunbar; 39.9472°N 79.5791°W	Dunbar Creek	Youghiogheny River
Dunbar Creek Lower Jack Dam	4 ft (1.2 m)	2022	Dunbar; 39.936°N 79.5865°W	Dunbar Creek	Youghiogheny River
Dunbar Creek Upper Jack Dam	2 ft (0.61 m)	2022	Dunbar; 39.9352°N 79.5871°W	Dunbar Creek	Youghiogheny River
Greenlick Run Lower Dam	8 ft (2.4 m)	2022	Mt. Pleasant; 40.1063°N 79.5061°W	Greenlick Run	Youghiogheny River
Greenlick Run Upper Dam	6 ft (1.8 m)	2022	Mt. Pleasant; 40.105°N 79.501°W	Greenlick Run	Youghiogheny River
Howell Dam	23 ft (7.0 m)	2009	Irwin; 40.2858°N 79.7087°W	Tributary to Little Sewickley Creek	Youghiogheny River
Log Dam (Rock Dam)	3 ft (0.91 m)	2020	Fayette County; 39.8086°N 79.4828°W	Long Run	Youghiogheny River
Meadow Run Dam	4 ft (1.2 m)	2010	Stewart Township; 39.8504°N 79.5042°W	Meadow Run	Youghiogheny River
Siebert Dam		2012	Somerset County; 39.7816°N 78.9835°W	Miller Run	Youghiogheny River
Lower Friendship Dam	30 ft (9.1 m)	1982			
Upper Friendship Dam	12 ft (3.7 m)	1982			
Lemon House Pond Dam	15 ft (4.6 m)	1984			
No Name Dam at Peace Light Inn	7 ft (2.1 m)	1991			
Butterfield Pond Dam	13 ft (4.0 m)	1992			
Van Horn Dam #1	8 ft (2.4 m)	1991	Upper Makefield Township		
Van Horn Dam #5	12 ft (3.7 m)	1991	Upper Makefield Township		
Unnamed dam	5 ft (1.5 m)	2009	Northumberland	Johnson Run	
Unnamed dam	5 ft (1.5 m)	1998		Laural Run	
Niederriter Farm Pond Dam	21 ft (6.4 m)	1995		Mill Creek	
Red Run Dam	7 ft (2.1 m)	1996		Red Run	
