= Cobun Creek =

Stream in West Virginia, U.S.

Coordinates: 39°36′41″N 79°58′15″W

Cobun Creek is a tributary of the Monongahela River in the U.S. state of West Virginia. It flows through the city of Morgantown.

Cobun Creek derives its name from Jonathan Coburn, an 18th-century pioneer.
