= Charleroi Locks & Dam =

Charleroi Lock and Dam
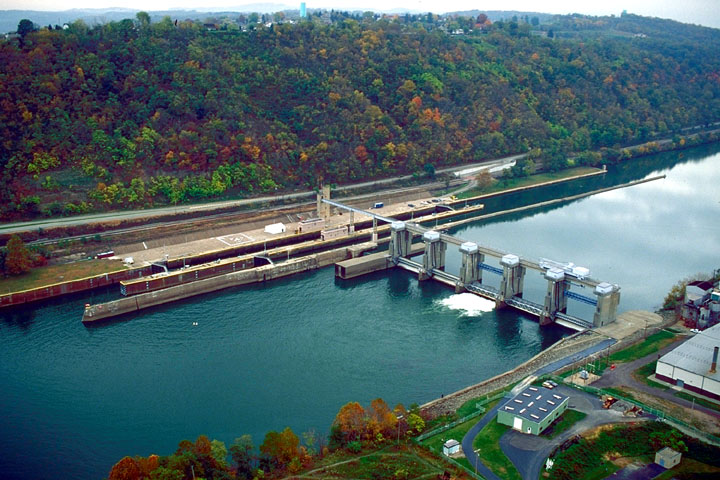
- Interactive map of Charleroi Lock and Dam
- Location: Charleroi, Pennsylvania and Monessen, Pennsylvania
- Coordinates: 40.1462°N 79.9000°W
- Construction began: 1931
- Opening date: 1932
- Operator: U.S. Army Corps of Engineers, Pittsburgh District

Dam and spillways
- Impounds: Monongahela River

Charleroi Locks & Dam, officially known as Locks & Dam 4 by the U.S. Army Corps of Engineers, is one of nine navigational structures on the Monongahela River between Pittsburgh, Pennsylvania and Fairmont, West Virginia. Maintained and built by the U.S. Army Corps of Engineers, the gated dam forms an upstream pool that is for 19.7 miles (31.7 km) to the Maxwell Lock & Dam.

The dam is located at mile 41.5 on the river. Unlike many of the river's single lock structure, the Charleroi facility features two working locks; this addition took place during a 1967 rehabilitation project.

== See also ==
- List of crossings of the Monongahela River
