= Grays Landing Lock & Dam =

Grays Landing Lock and Dam
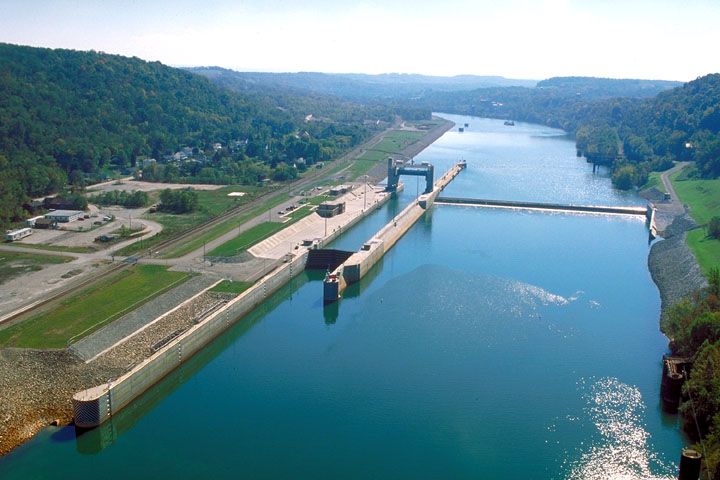
- Interactive map of Grays Landing Lock and Dam
- Location: Nicholson Township, Fayette County, Pennsylvania and Monongahela Township, Pennsylvania
- Coordinates: 39.8236°N 79.9219°W
- Construction began: 1988
- Opening date: 1995
- Operator: U.S. Army Corps of Engineers, Pittsburgh District

Dam and spillways
- Impounds: Monongahela River

Grays Landing Lock and Dam, previously known as Lock and Dam Number 7, is one of nine navigational structures on the Monongahela River between Pittsburgh, Pennsylvania and Fairmont, West Virginia. Maintained and built by the U.S. Army Corps of Engineers, the gated dam forms an upstream pool that is 11.2 miles (18 km) long, stretching to the base of the Point Marion Lock and Dam. It is located at river mile 82.

There is one lock chamber on the right descending bank of the river at the dam. The reservoir formed by the dam is also a municipal and industrial water supply. The structure is the third on the site. Originally, an 1880s stone masonry structure sat in this location; it was replaced in 1923 by a modern dam.

== See also ==
- List of crossings of the Monongahela River
