= Whiteday Creek =

Stream in West Virginia, U.S.

Coordinates: 39°33′36″N 80°03′10″W

Whiteday Creek is a stream in the U.S. state of West Virginia.

The name derives from an Indian tribal leader, Opekiska, whose name translated to English as "White Day".

== See also ==
- List of rivers of West Virginia
