= Brownsville Township, Pennsylvania =

Township in Pennsylvania, US

Coordinates: 40°01′00″N 79°52′16″W

Brownsville Township
- Township
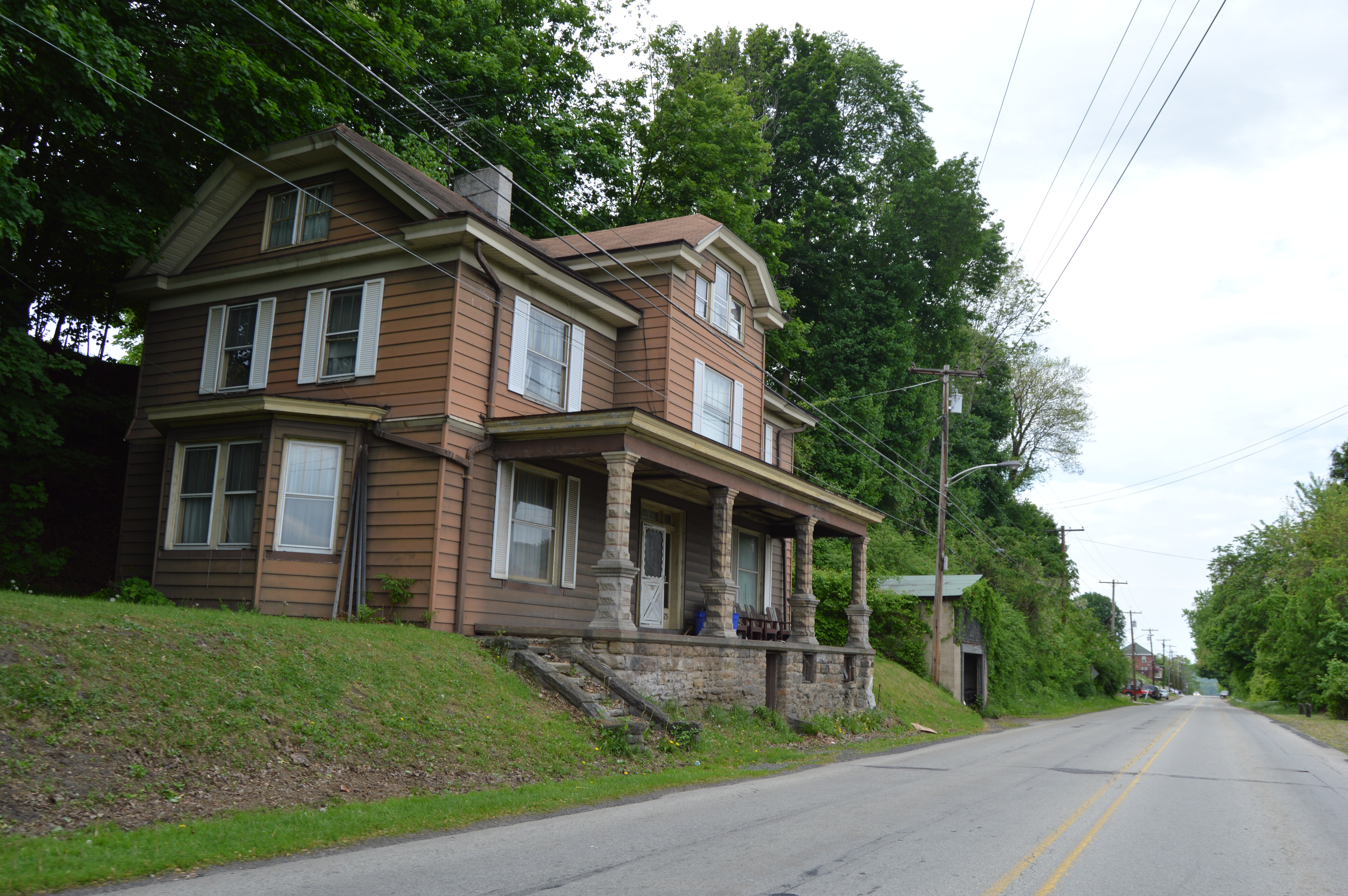
- Scene along the National Road

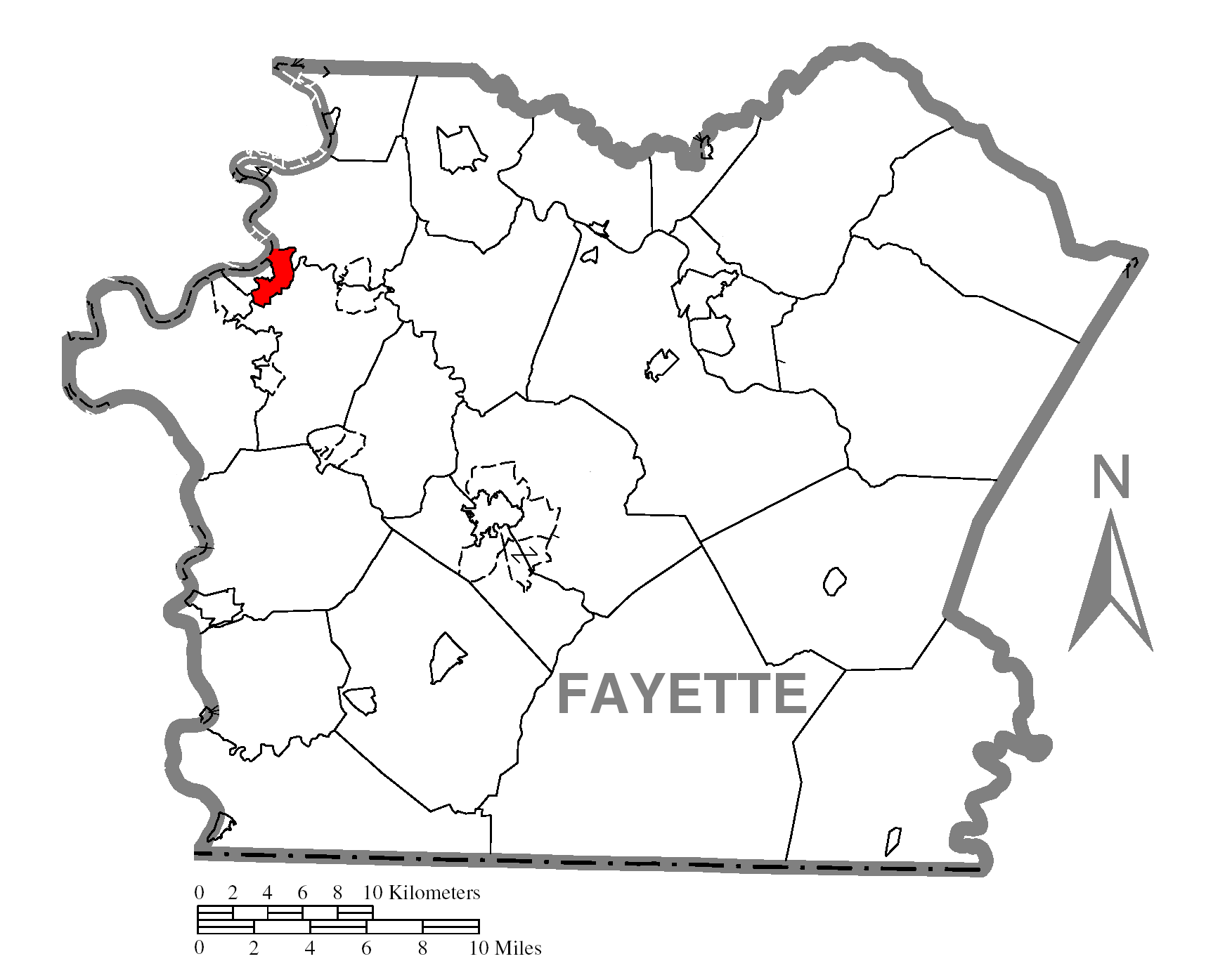
- Location of Brownsville Township in Fayette County

- Location of Fayette County in Pennsylvania
- Country: United States
- State: Pennsylvania
- County: Fayette

Area
  - Total: 1.55 sq mi (4.01 km^{2})
  - Land: 1.50 sq mi (3.89 km^{2})
  - Water: 0.046 sq mi (0.12 km^{2})

Population (2020)
  - Total: 536 ▼
  - Estimate (2022): 524
  - Density: 441.4/sq mi (170.42/km^{2})
- Time zone: UTC-4 (EST)
  - Summer (DST): UTC-5 (EDT)
- Area code: 724
- FIPS code: 42-051-09434
- Website: www.brownsvilletownship.org

Brownsville Township is a township in Fayette County, Pennsylvania, United States. The population was 536 at the 2020 census, a decline from the figure of 683 tabulated in 2010. It is served by the Brownsville School District.

The township contains the populated places of Knoxville and Century.

== Geography ==
Brownsville Township is in northwestern Fayette County; it is bordered to the west by the borough of Brownsville, to the southwest by Luzerne Township, to the southeast by Redstone Township, and to the northeast by Jefferson Township. On the northwest, across the Monongahela River, is the borough of West Brownsville in Washington County. Dunlap Creek forms the boundary with Luzerne Township and part of the boundary with Brownsville borough, while Redstone Creek forms the boundary with Jefferson Township; both creeks are tributaries of the Monongahela.

U.S. Route 40 crosses the township, leading northwest into Brownsville borough and southeast to Uniontown, the Fayette County seat. Downtown Pittsburgh is 40 miles (64 km) to the north.

According to the United States Census Bureau, the township has a total area of 1.55 square miles (4.01 km^{2}), of which 1.50 square miles (3.89 km^{2}) is land and 0.05 square miles (0.12 km^{2}), or 2.91%, is water.

== Demographics ==
Historical population
| Census | Pop. | Note | %± |
|---|---|---|---|
| 2010 | 683 | | — |
| 2020 | 536 | | −21.5% |
| 2022 (est.) | 524 | | −2.2% |
U.S. Decennial Census

As of the 2000 census, there were 769 people, 325 households, and 216 families residing in the township. The population density was 470.7 inhabitants per square mile (181.7/km^{2}). There were 362 housing units at an average density of 221.6 per square mile (85.6/km^{2}). The racial makeup of the township was 94.80% White, 3.90% African American, 0.13% Asian, 0.52% from other races, and 0.65% from two or more races. Hispanic or Latino of any race were 0.65% of the population.

There were 325 households, out of which 24.0% had children under the age of 18 living with them, 48.3% were married couples living together, 15.1% had a female householder with no husband present, and 33.5% were non-families. 29.2% of all households were made up of individuals, and 15.7% had someone living alone who was 65 years of age or older. The average household size was 2.34 and the average family size was 2.88.

In the township the population was spread out, with 20.2% under the age of 18, 6.9% from 18 to 24, 25.6% from 25 to 44, 25.2% from 45 to 64, and 22.1% who were 65 years of age or older. The median age was 43 years. For every 100 females there were 82.7 males. For every 100 females age 18 and over, there were 84.4 males.

The median income for a household in the township was $31,917, and the median income for a family was $37,500. Males had a median income of $29,000 versus $20,250 for females. The per capita income for the township was $16,777. About 9.7% of families and 14.8% of the population were below the poverty line, including 25.3% of those under age 18 and 12.0% of those age 65 or over.
