= Elizabeth Locks & Dam =

Elizabeth Lock and Dam
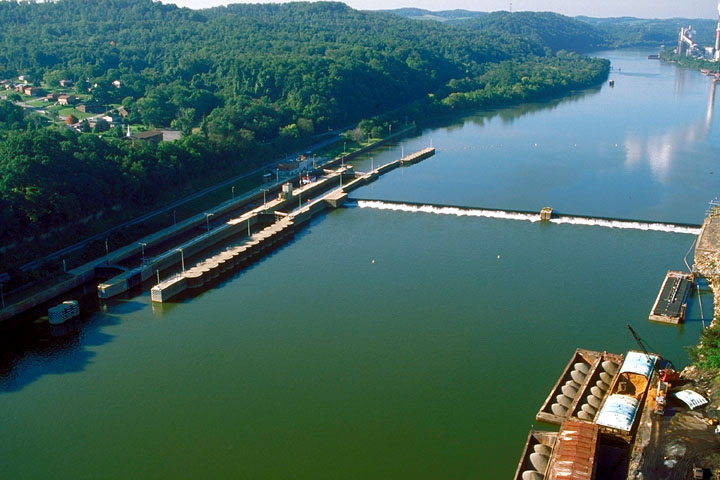
- Interactive map of Elizabeth Lock and Dam
- Location: Elizabeth, Pennsylvania and West Elizabeth, Pennsylvania
- Coordinates: 40.265°N 79.900°W
- Construction began: 1905
- Opening date: 1907 Samuel H. Sharpnack first lockmaster
- Operator: U.S. Army Corps of Engineers, Pittsburgh District

Dam and spillways
- Impounds: Monongahela River

Elizabeth Locks & Dam is one of nine navigational structures on the Monongahela River between Pittsburgh, Pennsylvania and Fairmont, West Virginia. Maintained and built by the U.S. Army Corps of Engineers, the gated dam forms an upstream pool that extends for 23.8 miles (38.3 km), stretching to Charleroi, Pennsylvania.

The dam is located at mile 23.8 of the Monongahela River; it was modernized during a major reconstruction project in 1979–80. The dam is scheduled for removal in July 2024.

== See also ==
List of crossings of the Monongahela River
