= Lowsville, West Virginia =

Lowsville
- Unincorporated community
- Location within the state of West Virginia Lowsville (the United States)
- Coordinates: 39°33′46″N 80°3′11″W
- Country: United States
- State: West Virginia
- County: Monongalia
- Elevation: 856 ft (261 m)
- Time zone: UTC-5 (Eastern (EST))
  - Summer (DST): UTC-4 (EDT)
- GNIS ID: 1555007

Lowsville is an unincorporated community in Monongalia County, West Virginia, United States.
