= Point Marion Lock and Dam =

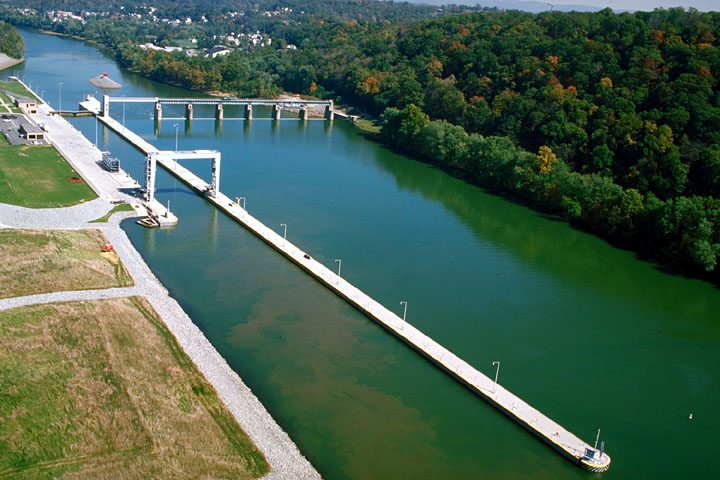
- Looking downstream at Point Marion Lock and Dam.
- Location: Dunkard / Springhill townships, Greene County, near Point Marion, Pennsylvania
- Coordinates: 39°43′38″N 79°54′39″W
- Construction began: 1923
- Opening date: 1926
- Operator(s): U.S. Army Corps of Engineers, Pittsburgh District

Dam and spillways
- Impounds: Monongahela River
- Height: 15 ft (4.6 m)
- Length: 638 ft (194 m)

Reservoir
- Total capacity: 11,500 acre⋅ft (14,200,000 m^{3})
- Catchment area: 2,751 sq mi (7,130 km^{2})
- Surface area: 704 acres (285 ha)

Point Marion Lock and Dam, previously known as Lock and Dam Number 8, is one of nine navigational structures on the Monongahela River between Pittsburgh, Pennsylvania and Fairmont, West Virginia. Maintained and built by the U.S. Army Corps of Engineers, the gated dam forms an upstream pool that is 11.2 miles (18.0 km) long, stretching to the base of the Morgantown Lock and Dam. It is located at river mile 90.5 (river kilometer 145.6).

There is one lock chamber on the left descending bank of the river at the dam, 84 feet (26 m) wide and 720 feet (220 m) long. The reservoir formed by the dam is also a municipal and industrial water supply.

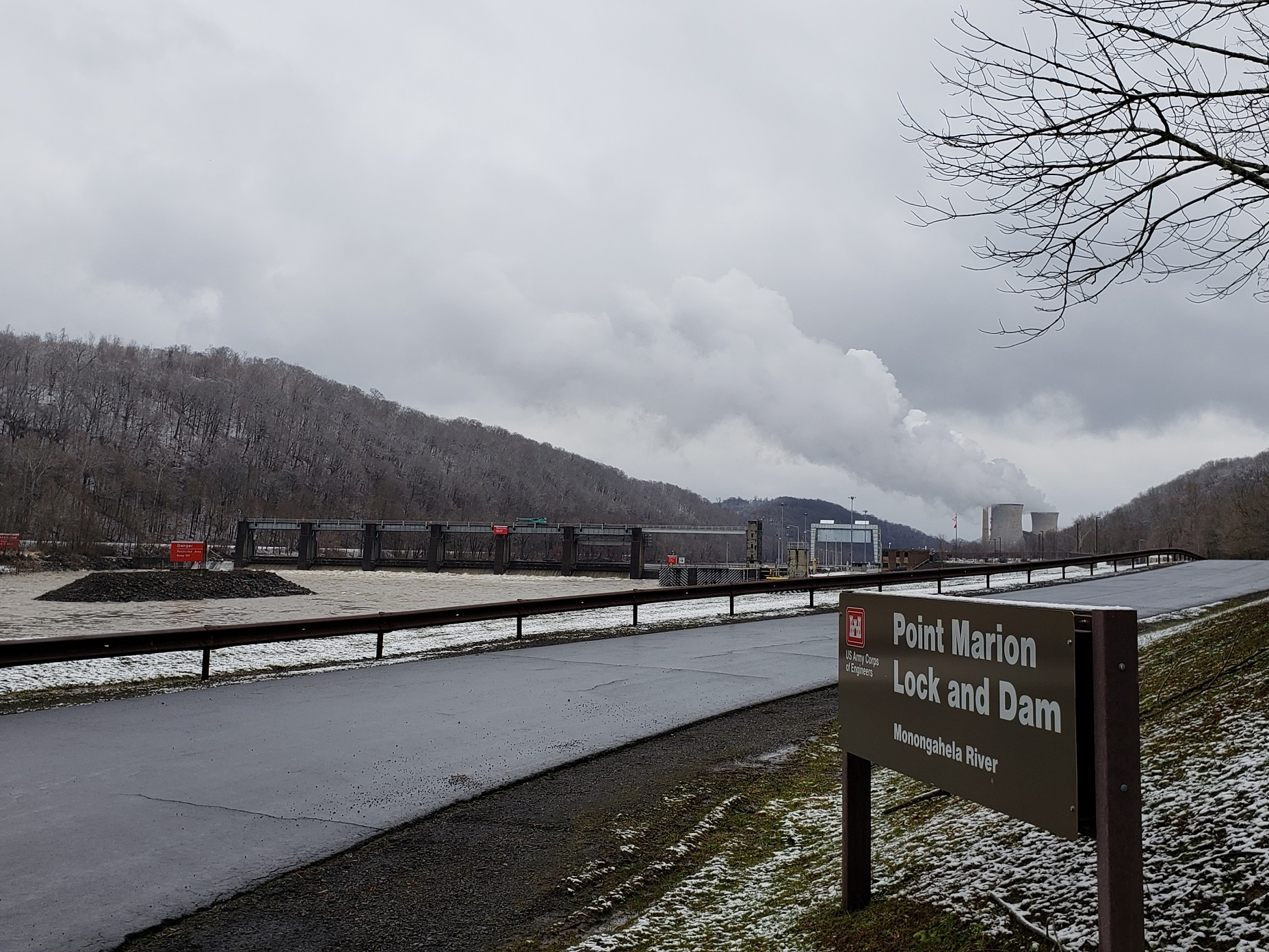
Point Marion Lock and Dam Entrance, with the Fort Martin Power Station in the distance.

== See also ==
List of crossings of the Monongahela River
