= Maxwell Lock & Dam =

Navigational lock and gated dam in Pennsylvania

Maxwell Lock and Dam
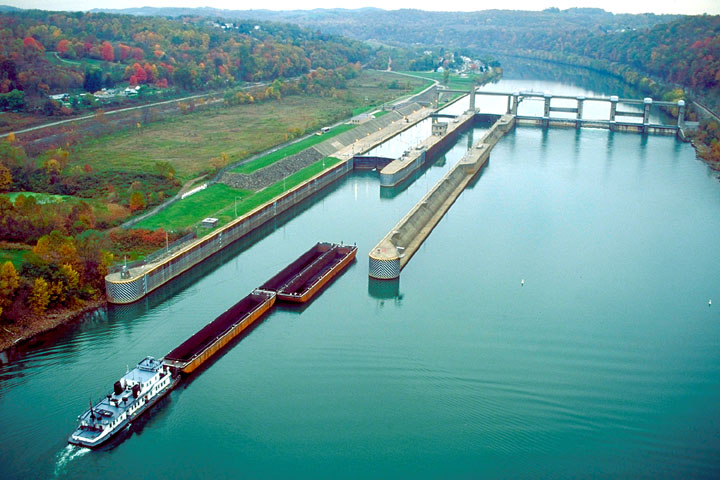
- Location: Fayette / Washington counties, near Centerville, Pennsylvania
- Coordinates: 40.002°N 79.960°W
- Construction began: 1960
- Opening date: 1965
- Operator(s): U.S. Army Corps of Engineers, Pittsburgh District

Dam and spillways
- Impounds: Monongahela River

Maxwell Lock and Dam is a navigational lock and gated dam on the Monongahela River between Centerville in Washington County, and Luzerne Township in Fayette County in Pennsylvania. It is part of a series of dams that canalizes the Monongahela to a depth of at least 9 feet (2.7 m) for its entire length from Fairmont, West Virginia to Pittsburgh, Pennsylvania. It is maintained by the U.S. Army Corps of Engineers, Pittsburgh District.

Maxwell has two lock chambers located on the right-descending river bank. The dam's upper pool extends about 20.8 miles (33.5 km) upstream to Grays Landing Lock and Dam at Grays Landing, Pennsylvania.

== History ==
Construction on Maxwell Lock and Dam began in 1960 and was completed in 1965. It replaced old Lock and Dam 6 at Rices Landing, Pennsylvania.

== See also ==
- List of crossings of the Monongahela River
