= Monongahela River =

River in Eastern United States

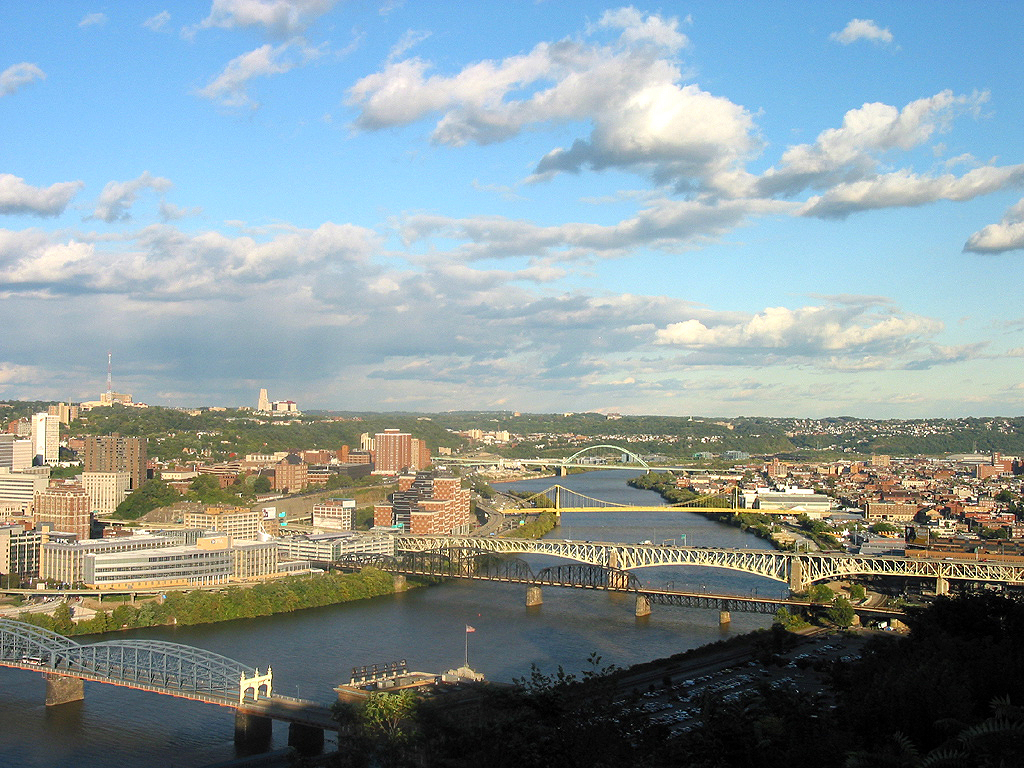
- The Monongahela River in Pittsburgh with South Side Pittsburgh on the right and Uptown Pittsburgh on the left

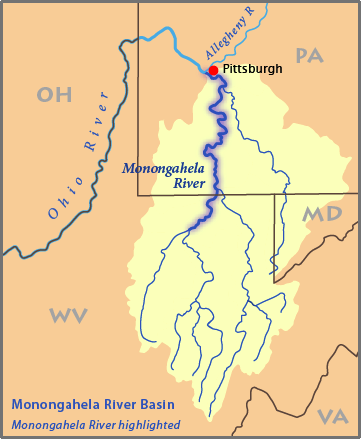
- Map of the Monongahela River basin with the Monongahela River highlighted

Location
- Country: United States
- State: Pennsylvania and West Virginia
- Counties: Marion WV, Monongalia WV, Greene PA, Fayette PA, Washington PA, Westmoreland PA, Allegheny PA

Physical characteristics
- Source: Tygart Valley River
  - location: Pocahontas County, West Virginia
  - coordinates: 38°28′06″N 79°58′51″W
  - elevation: 4,540 ft (1,380 m)
- 2nd source: West Fork River
  - location: Upshur County, West Virginia
  - coordinates: 38°51′08″N 80°21′32″W
  - elevation: 1,309 ft (399 m)
- Source confluence
  - location: Fairmont, West Virginia
  - coordinates: 39°27′53″N 80°09′10″W
  - elevation: 863 ft (263 m)
- Mouth: Ohio River
  - location: Pittsburgh, Pennsylvania
  - coordinates: 40°26′30″N 80°00′58″W
  - elevation: 709 ft (216 m)
- Length: 130 mi (210 km)
- Basin size: 7,340 mi^{2} (19,000 km^{2})
- Discharge
  - location: Braddock, PA
  - average: 12,650 cu ft/s (358 m^{3}/s)
  - minimum: 2,900 cu ft/s (82 m^{3}/s)
  - maximum: 81,100 cu ft/s (2,300 m^{3}/s)
- Discharge
  - location: Masontown, PA
  - average: 8,433 cu ft/s (238.8 m^{3}/s)

Basin features
- Tributaries
  - left: West Fork, Coal Run, Buffalo Creek, Hawkinberry Run, Paw Paw Creek, Pharoah Run, Parker Run, Indian Creek, Birchfield Run, Meadow Run, Broad Run, Dents Run, Scotts Run, Courtney Run, Robinson Run, Crooked Run, Dunkard Creek, Whiteley Creek, Little Whiteley Creek, Pegs Run, Muddy Creek, Noel Run, Pumpkin Run, Rush Run, Tenmile Creek, Fishpot Run, Barneys Run, Twomile Run, Lilly Run, Pike Run, Wood Run, Hooders Run, Maple Creek, Pigeon Creek, Dry Run, Mingo Creek, Huston Run, Lobbs Run, Peters Creek, Thompson Run, Homestead Run, West Run, Streets Run, Becks Run
  - right: Tygart River, Prickett Creek, Little Creek, Whiteday Creek, Joes Run, Toms Run, Booths Run, Cobun Creek, Deckers Creek, West Run, Laurel Run, Camp Run, Cheat River, Georges Creek, Jacobs Creek, Cats Run, Browns Run, Middle Run, Antram Run, Wallace Run, Hereford Hollow, Bates Run, Meadow Run, Kelley Run, Rush Run, Dunlap Creek, Redstone Creek, Lamb Lick Run, Downers Run, Speers Run, Turkey Hollow, Beckers Run, Sunfish Run, Bunola Run, Kelly Run, Mill Run, Smiths Run, Fallen Timber Run, Wylie Run, Youghiogheny River, Crooked Run, Turtle Creek, Ninemile Run

The Monongahela River (/məˌnɒŋɡəˈhiːlə/ mə-NONG-gə-HEE-lə, /-ˈheɪ-/ -HAY-), sometimes referred to locally as the Mon (/mɒn/), is a 130-mile-long (210 km) river on the Allegheny Plateau in north-central West Virginia and Southwestern Pennsylvania. The river flows from the confluence of its west and east forks in north-central West Virginia northeasterly into southwestern Pennsylvania, then northerly to Pittsburgh and its confluence with the Allegheny River to form the Ohio River. The river includes a series of locks and dams that makes it navigable.

== Etymology ==
The Unami word Monongahela means "falling banks", in reference to the geological instability of the river's banks. Moravian missionary David Zeisberger (1721–1808) gave this account of the naming: "In the Indian tongue the name of this river was Mechmenawungihilla (alternatively spelled Menawngihella), which signifies a high bank, which is ever washed out and therefore collapses."

The Lenape Language Project renders the word as Mënaonkihëla (pronounced [mənaoŋɡihəla]), translated "where banks cave in or erode", from the verbs mënaonkihële "the dirt caves off" (such as the bank of a river or creek, or in a landslide) and mënaonke (pronounced [mənaoŋɡe]), "it has a loose bank" (where one might fall in).

Monongalia County and the town of Monongah, both in West Virginia, are named for the river, as is the city of Monongahela in Pennsylvania. (The name "Monongalia" may be a misspelling that resulted from Monongahela being spelled incorrectly when the county was originally founded.)

=== Variant names ===
The USGS name for the river is the Monongahela River; there have been numerous alternative names, alternative spellings and misspellings in historical texts. (Note: including Malangueulé, Me-nan-gi-hil-li, Meh-non-au-au-ge-hel-al, Mehmannaunringgehlau, Mehmannauwinggehla, Mo-hon-ga-ly, Mo-hon-galy, Mo-hon-gey-e-la, Mo-hong-gey-e-la, Mohungahala, Mohunghala, Monaung, Monaungahela, Monna, Monnyahela, Monona, Mononga, Monongahalia, Monongahaly, Monongaheley, Monongahelia, Monongalia, Monongalo, Mononguhela, Mononyahela, Muddy River)

== Geography ==
The Monongahela is formed by the confluence of the West Fork River and its "east fork"—the Tygart Valley River—at Fairmont in north central West Virginia. From there it flows northeasterly to cross the Pennsylvania border just west of north Cheat Lake on its Cheat River tributary. Then it flows northerly across southwestern Pennsylvania, taking a bit of a detour northeast 10 miles south of Pittsburgh to approach Pittsburgh from the southeast and its confluence with the Allegheny River to form the Forks of the Ohio at "The Point" of Point State Park in Downtown Pittsburgh.

== Geology ==
Prior to early Pleistocene regional glaciation, more than 780,000 years ago, the ancestral Monongahela River (a.k.a. the Pittsburgh River) flowed northward from present-day north-central West Virginia, across western Pennsylvania and northwestern Ohio, and into the Saint Lawrence River watershed. One (or more) extensive ice sheet advance dammed the old north-flowing drainage and created a vast lake—known as Lake Monongahela—stretching from an unknown point north of present-day Beaver, Pennsylvania for ~200 miles (320 km) south to Weston, West Virginia. A river-lake with many narrow bays, its maximum water surface rose to 1,100 feet (340 m) above sea level. Over 200 feet (61 m) deep in places, its southwestward overflow gradually incised old drainage divides and contributed to the geological development of the present-day upper Ohio River Valley.

== Hydrography ==
Via the Ohio River, the river is part of the Mississippi watershed which drains to the Gulf of Mexico on the Atlantic Ocean.

The river's length is 130 miles, its drainage basin is 7,340 sq.mi. and the average 30-year discharge at Elizabeth, Pennsylvania, is 9,109 cfs. It falls 3,831 ft. in elevation from its highest source to its mouth on the Ohio River. It falls 280 feet from its forks to its mouth, a stretch made navigable by locks. The mean depth is about 20 ft.

In southwestern Pennsylvania, the Monongahela is met by two major tributaries: the Cheat River, which joins at Point Marion, and the Youghiogheny River, which joins at McKeesport.

Major tributaries include: Becks Run, Big Sandy Creek, Buffalo Creek, Cheat River, Crooked Run, Deckers Creek, Dunkard Creek, Lick Run, Middle Fork River, Paw Paw Creek, Peters Creek, Streets Run, Turtle Creek, Tygart Valley River, West Fork River, Youghiogheny River.

=== Locks and dams ===
The river is navigable its entire length with a series of locks and dams that maintain a minimum depth of 9 feet (2.7 m) to accommodate coal-laden barges. All dams are operated by the Pittsburgh District Army Corps of Engineers. In 2006, the navigation system, operated by the U.S. Army Corps of Engineers, had nine dam-locks along 128.7 miles (207.1 km) of waterway. The locks overcame a change in elevation of about 147 feet (44.8 m).

- Braddock Locks & Dam
- Locks & Dam 3
- Locks & Dam 4
- Maxwell Lock & Dam
- Grays Landing Lock & Dam
- Point Marion Lock and Dam
- Morgantown Lock and Dam
- Hildebrand Lock and Dam
- Opekiska Lock and Dam

=== Dam removal ===
The locks and dam at Elizabeth will be removed by the U.S. Army Corps of Engineers. Work will commence in 2024. Afterwards 30 miles of the river between Charleroi and Braddock will be free flowing.

== Ecology ==
According to the EPA's Toxics Release Inventory for 2010, the Monongahela ranked as the 17th most polluted river in the nation. The primary polluters were Pennsylvania iron and steel mills.

== Recreation ==
The upper drainage area of the river basin is renowned for its water sports/hobbies of whitewater kayaking (and in some cases whitewater rafting) opportunities. The land here is of a very rugged plateau type which allows streams to gather sufficient water volume before they fall off the plateau and create challenging rapids. Some of the best known specific stream locations for this include:

- Youghiogheny River at Ohiopyle, Pennsylvania
- Youghiogheny River at Friendsville, Maryland
- Cheat River at Albright, West Virginia
- Tygart River at Belington, West Virginia

== History ==
=== 18th and 19th centuries ===
The Monongahela River valley was the site of a famous battle that was one of the first in the French and Indian War—the Braddock Expedition (May–July 1755). It resulted in a sharp defeat for two thousand British and Colonial forces against those of the French and their Native American allies.

In 1817, the Pennsylvania legislature authorized the Monongahela Navigation Company to build 16 dams with bypass locks to create a river transportation system between Pittsburgh and the area that would later become West Virginia. Originally planned to run as far south as the Cheat River, the system was extended to Fairmont, and bituminous coal from West Virginia was the chief product transported downstream. After a canal tunnel through Grant's Hill in Pittsburgh was completed in 1832, boats could travel between the Monongahela River and the Western Division Canal of Pennsylvania's principal east–west canal and railroad system, the Main Line of Public Works. In 1897, the federal government took possession of the Monongahela Navigation through condemnation proceedings. Later, the dam-lock combinations were increased in size and reduced in number.

Briefly linked to the Monongahela Navigation was the Youghiogheny Navigation, a slack water system of 18.5 miles (29.8 km) between McKeesport and West Newton. It had two dam-locks overcoming a change in elevation of about 27 feet (8.2 m). Opening in 1850, it was destroyed by a flood in 1865.

During the 19th century and well into the twentieth, the Monongahela was heavily used by industry, and several U.S. Steel plants, including the Homestead Works, site of the Homestead Strike of 1892, were built along its banks. Following the killing of several workers in the course of the strike, anarchist Emma Goldman wrote: "Words had lost their meaning in the face of the innocent blood spilled on the banks of the Monongahela." Other mills included the Edgar Thomson Works in Braddock, the first steel works in the area, the Duquesne Works and the Jones and Laughlin steel works on the South Side of Pittsburgh. Only the Edgar Thomson works remain producing steel along the river.

Despite the closure of many of the mills in the 1980s and 90s, the Monongahela is still an important waterway for industry. The Mon Valley Works of U.S. Steel operates three plants, including the Edgar Thomson plant for basic steel marking, the Irvin plant for steel finishing, and the Clairton plant for coke production. Coal barges are a common sight on the river, and the railways which line either side are heavily used by freight. Other industries include power generation, chemicals, and recycling.

=== 20th century ===
Three ships in the United States Navy have been named Monongahela after the river. In October 1930, severe drought caused the river flow to drop below 10 cu ft/s (280 L/s), and in some places, it was possible to walk across the river bottom.

The river was the site of a famous airplane crash that has become the subject of urban legends and conspiracy theories. Early on the morning of January 31, 1956, a B-25 bomber en route from Nellis Air Force Base in Nevada to Olmsted Air Force Base in Pennsylvania crashed into the river near the Glenwood Bridge in Homestead, Pennsylvania. The six crewmen survived the initial crash, but two of them succumbed in the cold water and drowned. Despite the relatively shallow water, the aircraft was never recovered and became known as the "ghost bomber". The Pittsburgh Post-Gazette published a graphical representation of the flight path and flight details in 1999. As of 2018, the bomber has not been found.

== In popular culture ==
The Pittsburgh folk song, "Where the Old Allegheny and Monongahela Flow," references the Monongahela River.

Bruce Springsteen's song "Youngstown," from his 1995 album The Ghost of Tom Joad, references the Monongahela Valley as one of the regions devastated by the declining iron and steel industries in the mid to late 20th century.

Monongahela rye is an historic style of rye whiskey that developed in the Monongahela Valley of Pennsylvania and was especially popular in the United States before Prohibition.

== Gallery ==
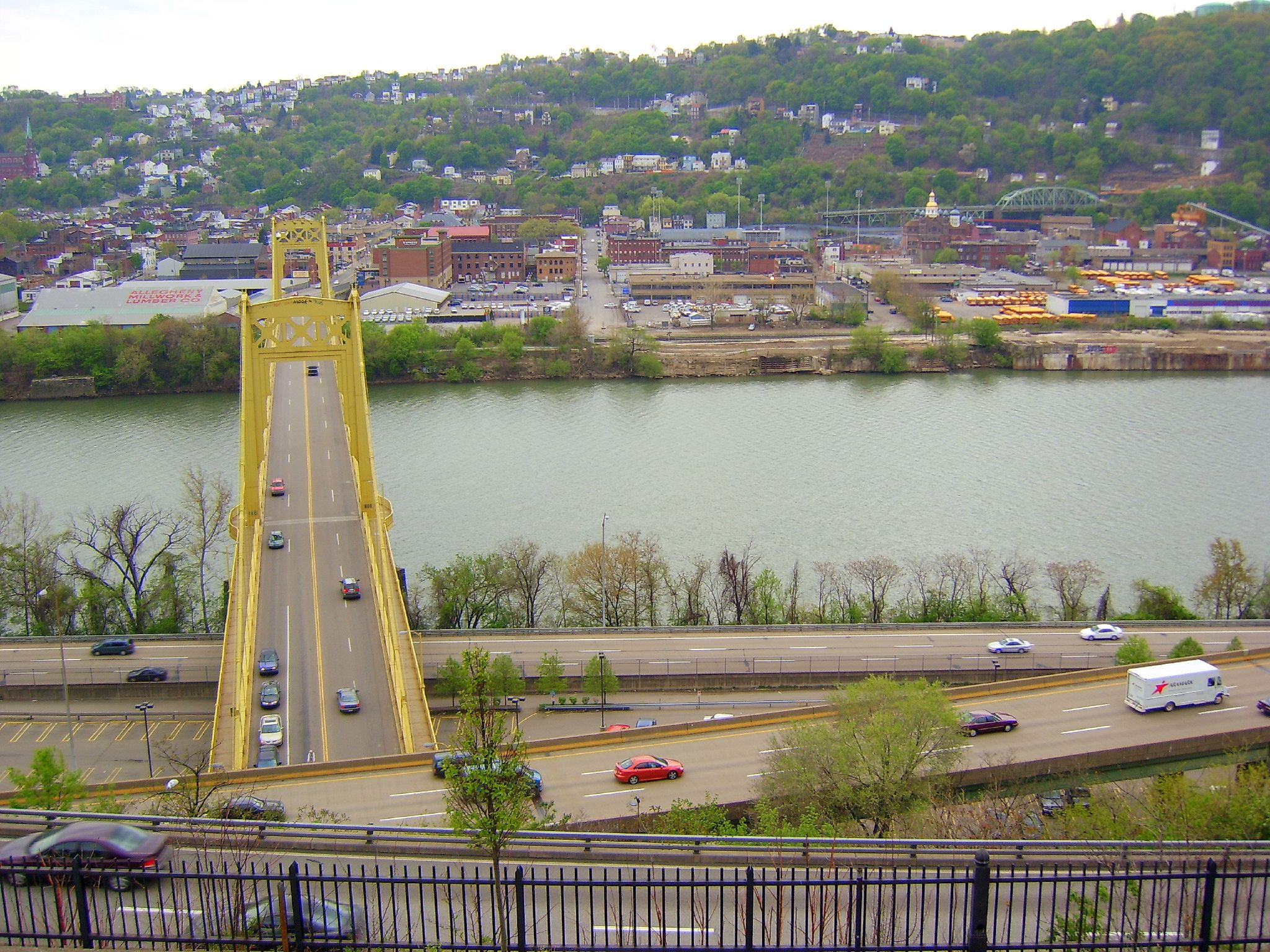
The South Tenth Street Bridge over the Monongahela River in Pittsburgh in 2005

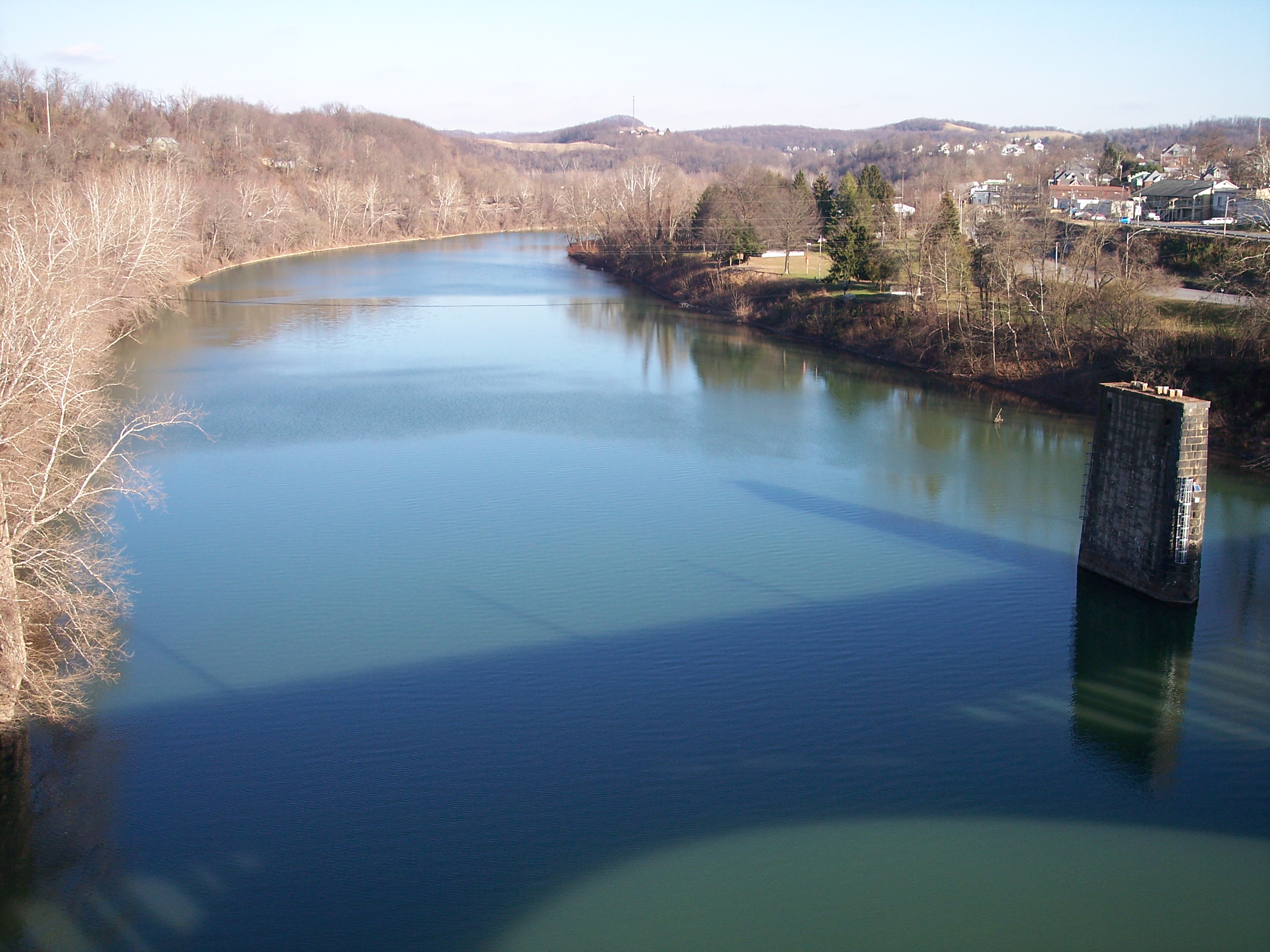
The Monongahela River in Fairmont, West Virginia, in 2006

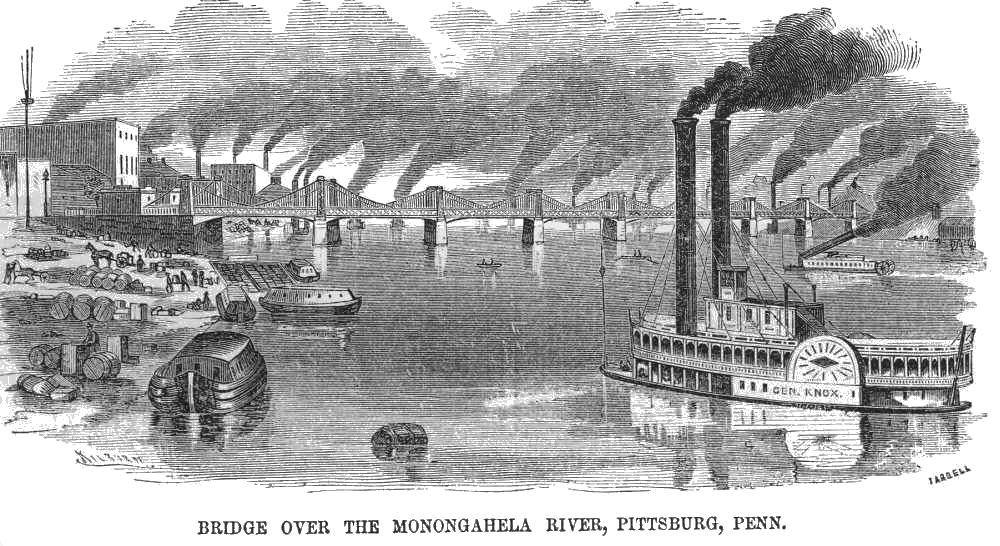
Monongahela River Scene, 1857

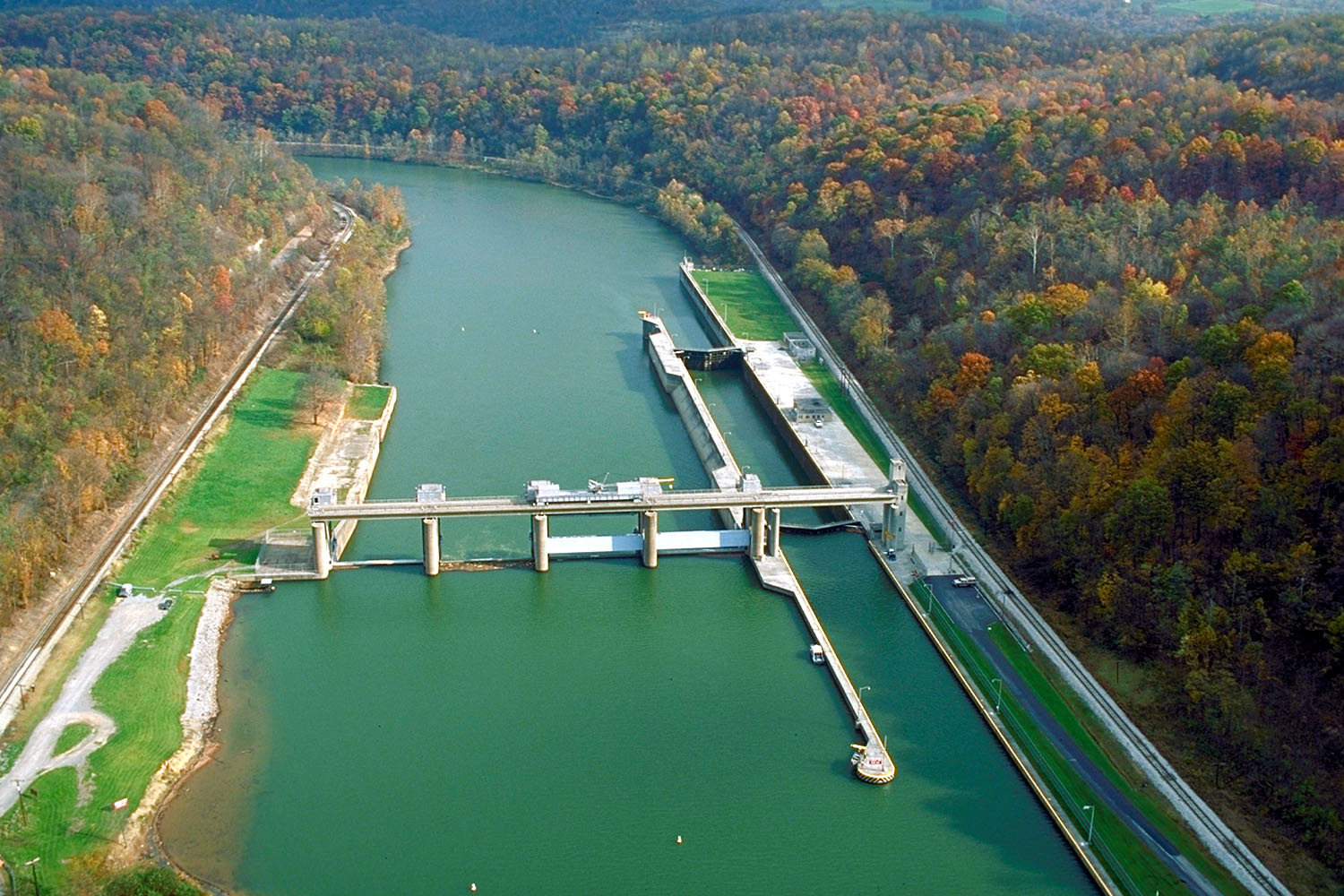
Opekiska Lock and Dam on the Monongahela River near Fairmont, West Virginia, at river mile 115 (185 km)

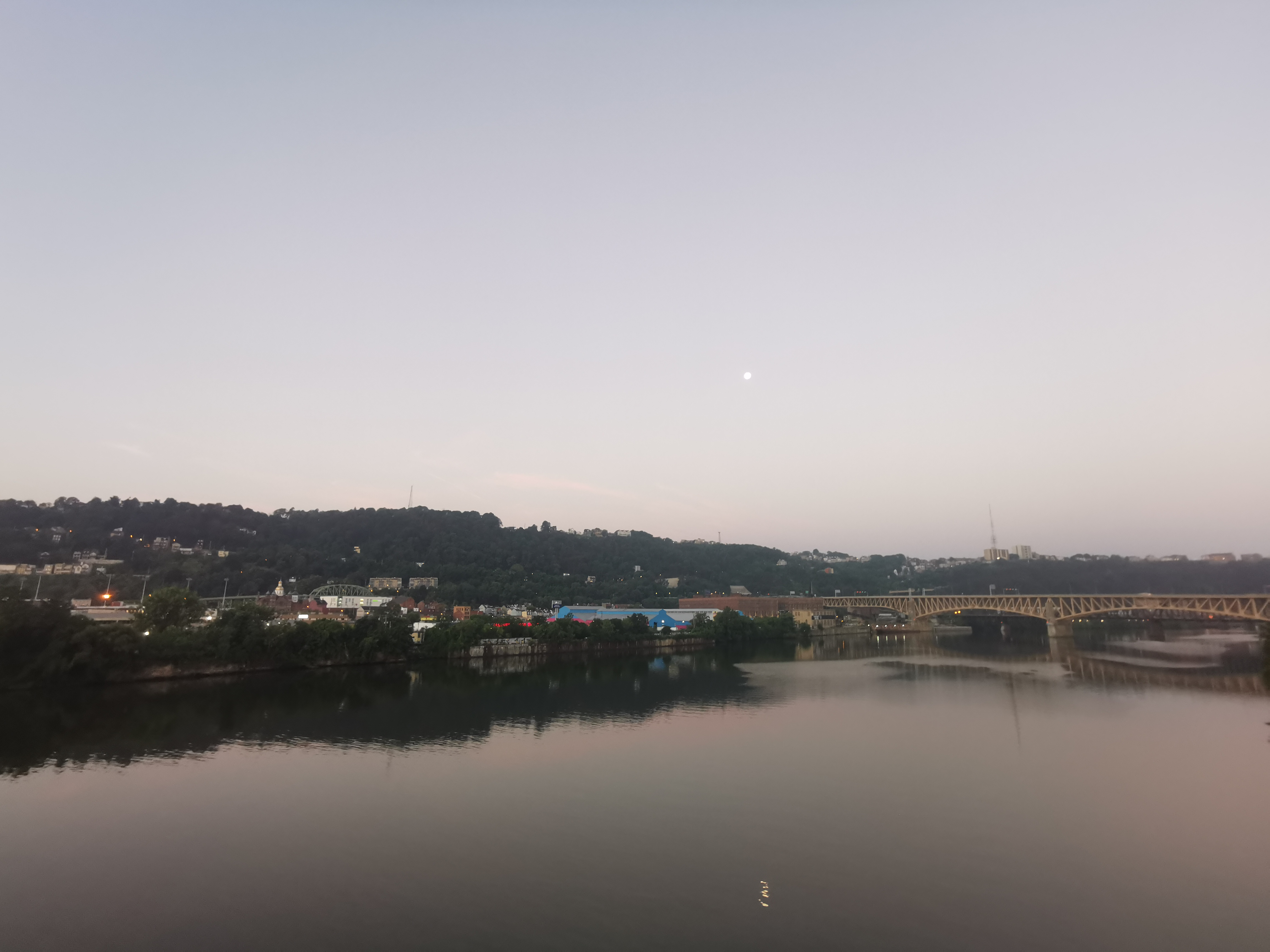
Monongahela River in Pittsburgh in 2021

== See also ==
- List of crossings of the Monongahela River
- List of rivers of Pennsylvania
- List of rivers of West Virginia
- Geography of Pennsylvania

== Bibliography ==
- Bissell, Richard (1952), The Monongahela, Rinehart & Co.
- Callahan, James Morton and Bernard Lee Butcher (1912), Genealogical and Personal History of the Upper Monongahela Valley, West Virginia, New York: Lewis Historical Publishing Company.
- Core, Earl L. (1984), "The Monongalia River," in: Bartlett, Richard A. (ed), Rolling Rivers: An Encyclopedia of America's Rivers. New York: McGraw-Hill. ISBN 0-07-003910-0. pp 149–52.
- Core, Earl L. (1974–84), The Monongalia Story: A Bicentennial History, Parsons, W.Va.: McClain Printing Co., 5 volumes; an extensive, well-documented natural & human history of the Monongahela River basin.
  - Volume I: Prelude (1974)
  - Volume II: The Pioneers (1976)
  - Volume III: Discord (1979)
  - Volume IV: Industrialization (1984)
  - Volume V: Sophistication (1984)
