= Pennsylvania's 45th Senate district =

American legislative district

Pennsylvania's 45th State Senate district
Senator
Nick Pisciottano; D–West Mifflin
- Population (2021): 249,661

Pennsylvania State Senate District 45 includes part of Allegheny County. It is currently represented by Democrat Nick Pisciottano.

== District profile ==
The district includes the following areas:

Allegheny County:

- Baldwin
- Baldwin Township
- Braddock
- Brentwood
- Castle Shannon
- Clairton
- Dravosburg
- Duquesne
- East McKeesport
- East Pittsburgh
- Elizabeth
- Elizabeth Township
- Forward Township
- Glassport
- Homestead
- Liberty
- Lincoln
- McKeesport
- Monroeville
- Munhall
- North Braddock
- North Versailles Township
- Pitcairn
- Plum
- Port Vue
- South Versailles Township
- Trafford (Allegheny County portion)
- Turtle Creek
- Versailles
- Wall
- West Elizabeth
- West Homestead
- West Mifflin
- Whitaker
- White Oak
- Whitehall
- Wilmerding

== Senators ==
Representative	Party	Years	District home	Note	Counties
Leonard Staisey	Democratic	1961–1966			Allegheny (part)
Joseph M. Gaydos	Democratic	1967–1968		Resigned November 5, 1968, upon election to U.S. Congress.	Allegheny (part)
Edward P. Zemprelli	Democratic	1969–1972			Allegheny (part)
Edward P. Zemprelli	Democratic	1973–1982			Allegheny (part), Westmoreland (part)
Edward P. Zemprelli	Democratic	1983–1988			Allegheny (part), Washington (part), Westmoreland (part)
Albert V. Belan	Democratic	1989–1992			Allegheny (part), Washington (part), Westmoreland (part)
Albert V. Belan	Democratic	1993–2000			Allegheny (part), Westmoreland (part)
Sean Logan	Democratic	2001–2010		Resigned August 24, 2010.	Allegheny (part), Westmoreland (part)
Jim Brewster	Democratic	2010–2024		Not seated at start of 2021 session Eventually seated on January 13.	Allegheny (part), Westmoreland (part)
Nick Pisciottano	Democratic	2024 – Present	West Mifflin		

== Recent election results ==
PA Senate election, 2024: Pennsylvania Senate, District 45
Party	Candidate	Votes	%
Democratic	Nick Pisciottano	69,105	52.98
Republican	Jen Dintini	61,117	46.85
Total votes		130,222	100.0
Democratic hold			

PA Senate election, 2020
Party	Candidate	Votes	%
Democratic	Jim Brewster (incumbent)	66,261	50.03
Republican	Nicole Ziccarelli	66,192	49.97
Total votes		132,453	100.0
Democratic hold			

PA Senate election, 2016
Party	Candidate	Votes	%
Democratic	Jim Brewster (incumbent)	89,016	100
Total votes		89,016	100.0
Democratic hold			

PA Senate election, 2012
Party	Candidate	Votes	%
Democratic	Jim Brewster (incumbent)	72,189	100
Total votes		72,189	100.0
Democratic hold			

45th Senatorial District special election, 2010
Party	Candidate	Votes	%
Democratic	Jim Brewster	35,943	54.8
Republican	Paul Olijar	26,569	40.5
Libertarian	Leonard Young	3,104	4.7
Total votes		65,616	100.0
Democratic hold			

PA Senate election, 2008
Party	Candidate	Votes	%
Democratic	Sean Logan (incumbent)	84,210	100
Total votes		84,210	100.0
Democratic hold			
