= South Allegheny Middle/Senior High School =

Location
- 2743 Washington Blvd. Liberty, Allegheny County, Pennsylvania 15133; United States; 40.324135°N 79.867272°W

Information
- School type: Public
- Established: 1966
- Status: Open
- School district: South Allegheny School District
- NCES District ID: 4221910
- Superintendent: Mr. David McDonald
- CEEB code: 392267
- NCES School ID: 422191000440
- Principal: Stephen Sikon (High School)
- Principal: Marisa Bragg (Middle School)
- Grades: 6 through 12
- Enrollment: 717 (2017-18)
- Student to teacher ratio: 13.80
- Campus type: Suburban
- Colors: Blue and gold
- Song: South Allegheny Alma Mater
- Mascot: Gladiator
- Yearbook: De Nobis
- Information: 412-675-3070
- Website: southallegheny.org

South Allegheny Middle/High School is part of the South Allegheny School District located in Allegheny County, Pennsylvania. The building houses both middle school students (grades 6 through 8) and high school students (grades 9 through 12). The school serves students from Glassport, Port Vue, Liberty, Lincoln, and parts of Elizabeth.

The school provides all of its students with curriculum aligned to Pennsylvania standards, as well as the opportunity to attend Steel Center Vocational Technical School.

== History ==
=== District ===
South Allegheny school district was formed in 1966 with the merger of Port Vue-Liberty School District, Lincoln Boro School District and Glassport School District.

=== Mascot and school colors ===
With the announcement of the planned Port-Vue Liberty and Glassport merger; there was speculation as to which school's mascot and colors would be used for the new South Allegheny School District. Port Vue-Liberty had their royal blue and gold Bulldogs. Glassport had their red and black Gladiators. It is thought that the mascot was determined by the outcome of a football game between Port-Vue Liberty and Glassport in which the Glassport Gladiators won. The colors are thought to be determined in a similar way with the losing team's colors being chosen as South Allegheny's school colors.

=== Glassport Memorial Stadium ===
Glassport Memorial Stadium was officially opened to the public on October 16, 1950. On the night of the $225,000 stadium's opening, 4243 tickets were sold—though the stadium only seats 4167—for the field's maiden football match between Glassport High School and Elizabeth High School. The Glassport Gladiators won the game, 26-6. The stadium hosted its final WPIAL football game on October 29, 2021. The venue went out on a high note with the Gladiators beating the Mount Pleasant Area Vikings 21-7, enough to clinch a spot in the playoffs for the first time since 2012. The South Allegheny football team moved to the new on-campus "Gladiator Stadium" ahead of the 2022 season. Glassport Memorial Stadium was demolished in November 2024.

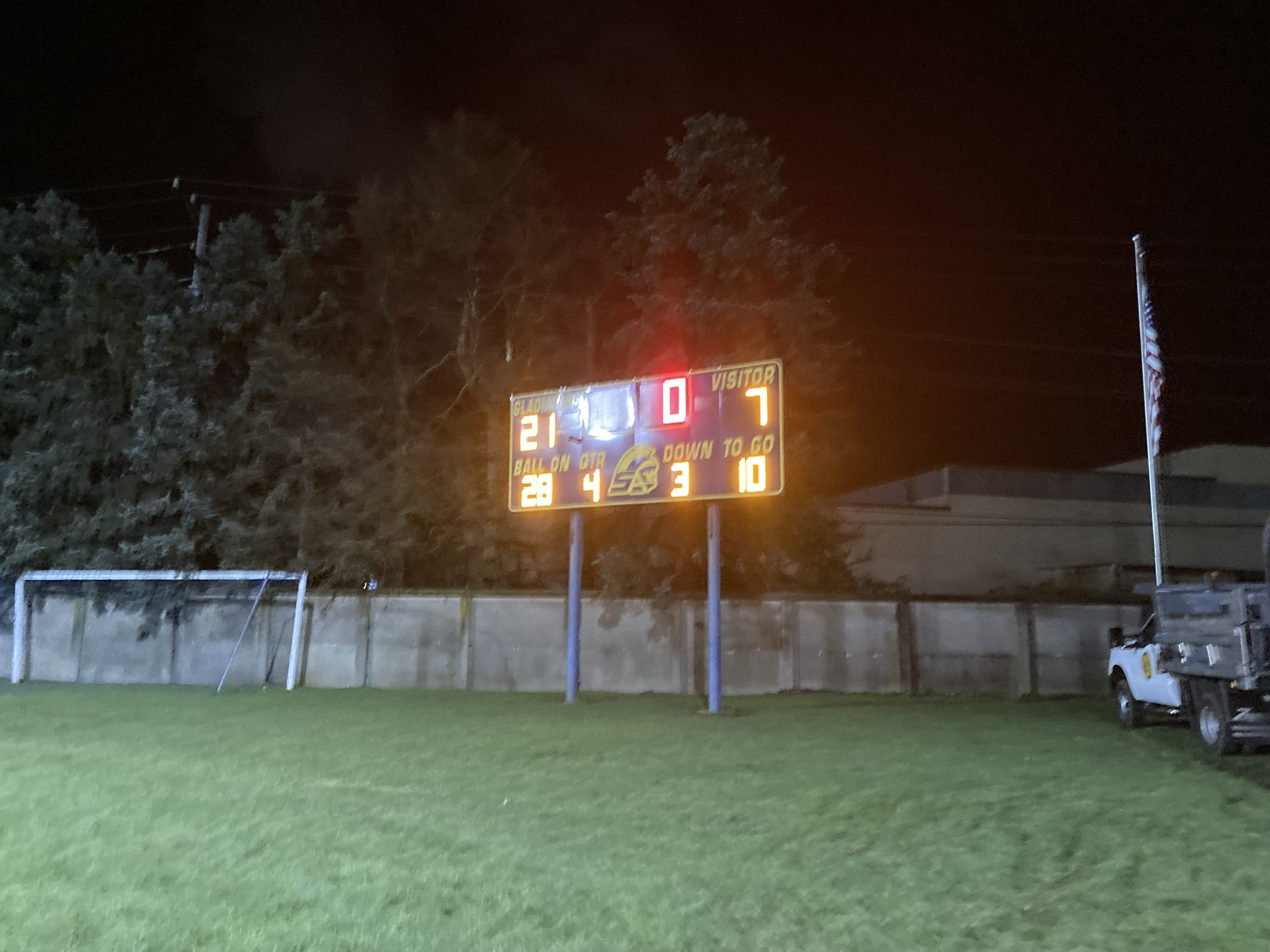
The scoreboard at Glassport Memorial Stadium (10-29-2021)

== Athletics ==
South Allegheny High School competes in the Pennsylvania Interscholastic Athletic Association (PIAA). It also is a member of the Western Pennsylvania Interscholastic Athletic League (WPIAL).

- Baseball
- Basketball
- Cheerleading
- Golf
- Football
- Soccer
- Softball
- Track
- Volleyball (girls)
- Wrestling

=== Football ===
The football team is a member of the WPIAL Class AA Allegheny Conference. The team won the WPIAL AA Championship in 1977. It finished the 2008 season at 5-5, the first "non-losing" season since 1993. In 2012, the Gladiators qualified for the WPIAL playoffs for the first time since 1986. The team made another appearance in the playoffs in 2021. The South Allegheny Gladiators are currently experiencing a resurgence with a breakout 9-3 2024 season. The Gladiators advanced to the second round of the WPIAL AA playoffs before losing to Ellwood City by a single point.

WPIAL AA Championship 1977	Total
South Allegheny	12
Laurel	6

Season Records

Year	W	L	League	Playoffs
2004	2	7	WPIAL AA	
2005	0	10	WPIAL AA	
2006	4	5	WPIAL AA	
2007	2	7	WPIAL AA	
2008	5	5	WPIAL AA	
2009	0	10	WPIAL AA	
2010	2	8	WPIAL AA	
2011	1	9	WPIAL AA	
2012	7	3	WPIAL AA	loss vs Jeannette 7-40
2013	1	8	WPIAL AA	
2014	2	7	WPIAL AA	
2015	2	8	WPIAL AA	
2016	1	9	WPIAL AA	
2017	2	7	WPIAL AA	
2018	4	6	WPIAL AA	
2019	4	6	WPIAL AA	
2020	4	3	WPIAL AAA	
2021	4	7	WPIAL AAA	loss vs Keystone Oaks 0-34
2022	1	9	WPIAL AAA	
2023	1	9	WPIAL AAA	
2024	9	3	WPIAL AA	win vs Waynesburg Central 53-14, loss vs Ellwood City 12-13
2025				

=== Notable Athletes ===
- Dave Opfar, Saint Francis football head coach, and player for the Pittsburgh Steelers
- Ron Crosby, linebacker for the New Orleans Saints and New York Jets
- Jim Cope (American football), linebacker at The Ohio State University and Atlanta Falcons
- Scott Seabol, Major League baseball infielder
- Jesse James, tight end with Penn State, the Pittsburgh Steelers, and the Detroit Lions

== Extracurricular student activities ==
=== Band ===
The South Allegheny Band participates in many local activities including community parades and concerts. The band is noted as an organization that has achieved excellence and credit for its students, school, and community. Each year the South Allegheny Band performs at several non-competitive band festivals, and for the past 39 years have hosted its own band festival, traditionally on the weekend after Labor Day. The band has also performed at Steelers and Pirates games, in addition to many Pittsburgh parades and college football games. The band will travel to Walt Disney World Resort in Florida to participate in the "Celebrate a Dream Come True" parade as part of Magic Music Days in the Magic Kingdom theme park.

=== Chorus ===
Consisting of students in grades 5 through 12, the South Allegheny Chorus meets during the regular school day to learn and rehearse songs for their winter and spring concerts, as well as public performances. The chorus makes frequent field trips to music-related events such as musical theater performances in Pittsburgh.

=== DeNobis (high school yearbook) ===
The yearbook committee, grades 11 and 12, meets daily during the regular school day, and occasionally after school, to produce a memorable high school yearbook.

=== SATV ===
SATV South Allegheny Television is a school news program that provide students interested in the communication industry an opportunity to learn the basics of video taping, editing, creative development, and communication technology.
