= John Inglis (American politician) =

American politician from Pennsylvania

Member of the Pennsylvania House of Representatives from the 38th district
- Incumbent
- Assumed office December 1, 2024
- Preceded by: Nick Pisciottano

Personal details
- Party: Democrat

John C. Inglis III is an American politician who has represented the 38th district of the Pennsylvania House of Representatives as a Democrat since 2024.

== Biography ==
The son of a teacher, prior to his election to the state house he worked for 15 years as a teacher and school counselor for the West Mifflin Area School District, and was a proud member of the American Federation of Teachers. Inglis stated that he became interested in running when he started to get more involved in extracurricular activities, and in 2017 he won a seat to the West Mifflin Borough Council.

When incumbent representative Nick Pisciottano stated that he would not be seeking re-election as he was running for the State Senate, Inglis entered the three-way race for the Democratic nomination. Inglis is Pisciottano's cousin. In the primary he defeated Victoria Schmotzer, daughter of former state representative Martin Schmotzer, by 38 points, and went on to defeat Republican Stone Sobieralski by 11 percentage points in the general election.
