= Kenneth Ruffing =

American politician

Kenneth W. Ruffing

Member of the Pennsylvania House of Representatives from the 38th district
- In office January 5, 1999 – November 30, 2006
- Preceded by: Richard D. Olasz
- Succeeded by: Bill Kortz

Personal details
- Born: February 24, 1967 (age 59) Homestead, Pennsylvania, U.S.
- Party: Democratic
- Spouse: Karen
- Children: 2
- Education: Robert Morris College

Kenneth W. Ruffing (born February 24, 1967) is a former Democratic member of the Pennsylvania House of Representatives. He represented the 38th legislative district from 1999 through 2006.

Ruffing graduated from West Mifflin High School in 1985 and earned a degree in business administration from Robert Morris College in 1990. Prior to elective office, Ruffing worked as a licensed insurance agent. He was a member of the West Mifflin Borough Council for seven years and served as its president for two.

In the lead-up to the 2006 primary election, Ruffing faced criticism stemming from his vote in favor of the controversial 2005 legislative pay raise. In face of this criticism, Ruffing claimed that he donated his pay raise to an unnamed "autistic charity." Ruffing garnered 26.2% to place third in the three-way race against C.L. Jabbour and eventual winner Bill Kortz.

Following the election, Ruffing admitted that he used the money to pay tuition for his autistic son to attend St. Colman's Catholic School in Turtle Creek. In August 2006, Ruffing was charged with driving under the influence of alcohol after failing two field sobriety tests and registering a BAC of .346, which is four times Pennsylvania's legal limit. In 2007, it was revealed that Ruffing, as a lame duck legislator, attended legislative training trips at the public's expense after his defeat.
