= Pennsylvania House of Representatives, District 38 =

American legislative district

Pennsylvania's 38th State House of Representatives district
Representative
John Inglis; D–West Mifflin
- Population (2022): 64,487

The 38th Pennsylvania House of Representatives District is located in southwestern Pennsylvania and has been represented by Democrat John Inglis since 2025.

== District profile ==
The 38th Pennsylvania House of Representatives District is located in Allegheny County and includes the following areas:

- Baldwin
- Dravosburg
- Glassport
- Pittsburgh (part)
  - Ward 31
- West Mifflin (part)
  - District 01
  - District 02
  - District 05
  - District 06
  - District 07
  - District 08
  - District 09
  - District 10
  - District 11
  - District 12
  - District 13
  - District 14
  - District 16
  - District 17
  - District 18
  - District 19
  - District 20
  - District 21
- Whitehall

== Representatives ==
Representative	Party	Years	District home	Note
Prior to 1969, seats were apportioned by county.
Bernard R. Novak	Democrat	1969 – 1980		
Richard D. Olasz	Democrat	1981 – 1998		
Kenneth W. Ruffing	Democrat	1999 – 2006		
William Kortz	Democrat	2007 – 2020	Dravosburg	
Nick Pisciottano	Democrat	2020 – 2024	West Mifflin	
John Inglis	Democrat	2025 – present	West Mifflin	Incumbent

== Recent election results ==
PA House election, 2024: Pennsylvania House, District 38
Party	Candidate	Votes	%
Democratic	John Inglis	19,559	55.51
Republican	Stone Sobieralski	15,675	44.49
Total votes		35,234	100.00
Democratic hold			

PA House election, 2022: Pennsylvania House, District 38
Party	Candidate	Votes	%
Democratic	Nick Pisciottano (incumbent)	Unopposed	
Total votes		20,430	100.00
Democratic hold			

PA House election, 2020: Pennsylvania House, District 38
Party	Candidate	Votes	%
Democratic	Nick Pisciottano	20,362	56.09
Republican	Linda Book	15,941	43.91
Total votes		36,303	100.00
Democratic hold			

PA House election, 2018: Pennsylvania House, District 38
Party	Candidate	Votes	%
Democratic	William Kortz (incumbent)	Unopposed	
Total votes		20,039	100.00
Democratic hold			

PA House election, 2016: Pennsylvania House, District 38
Party	Candidate	Votes	%
Democratic	William Kortz (incumbent)	21,271	65.65
Republican	Rod Salka	11,130	34.35
Total votes		32,401	100.00
Democratic hold			

PA House election, 2014: Pennsylvania House, District 38
Party	Candidate	Votes	%
Democratic	William Kortz (incumbent)	Unopposed	
Total votes		13,998	100.00
Democratic hold			

PA House election, 2012: Pennsylvania House, District 38
Party	Candidate	Votes	%
Democratic	William Kortz (incumbent)	Unopposed	
Total votes		13,998	100.00
Democratic hold			

PA House election, 2010: Pennsylvania House, District 38
Party	Candidate	Votes	%
Democratic	William Kortz (incumbent)	Unopposed	
Total votes		14,454	100.00
Democratic hold			
