= Albert Belan =

American politician

Albert V. Belan

Member of the Pennsylvania Senate from the 45th district
- In office January 3, 1989 – November 30, 2000
- Preceded by: Edward Zemprelli
- Succeeded by: Sean Logan
- Constituency: Parts of Allegheny, Washington, and Westmoreland Counties

Personal details
- Born: March 7, 1930 Munhall, Pennsylvania
- Died: June 7, 2011 (aged 81)
- Party: Democratic
- Spouse: Elizabeth Vehec
- Children: 1 child
- Education: University of Pittsburgh; Penn State University; Wilson College for Minor Judiciary

Military service
- Allegiance: United States
- Branch/service: United States Army
- Years of service: 1951—1952

Albert V. "Bud" Belan (March 7, 1930 – June 7, 2011) was a Democratic member of the Pennsylvania State Senate.

== Formative years ==
A native of Munhall, Pennsylvania, Belan earned degrees from the University of Pittsburgh in 1966 and from Penn State University in 1967.

== Public service career ==
A board member of the West Mifflin Area School District from 1970 to 1971, he also served as a member of the West Mifflin Borough Council from 1972 to 1976.

Belen subsequently earned his District Justice certification from the Wilson College for Minor Judiciary in 1975, and then served as a District Justice for Magisterial District 05-2-14 from 1976 through 1988.

He represented the 45th legislative district in the Pennsylvania State Senate from 1989 through 2000.

Belan died on June 7, 2011.
