= Scott Seabol =

American baseball player (born 1975)

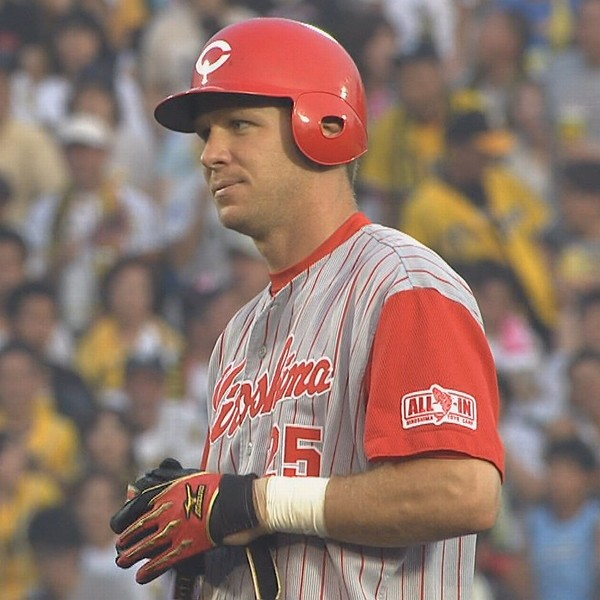
- Seabol with the Hiroshima Toyo Carp in 2008
- Infielder
- Born: May 17, 1975 (age 50); McKeesport, Pennsylvania, U.S.
- Batted: Right Threw: Right

Professional debut
- MLB: April 8, 2001, for the New York Yankees
- KBO: July 12, 2006, for the Kia Tigers
- NPB: March 28, 2008, for the Hiroshima Toyo Carp

Last appearance
- MLB: September 30, 2005, for the St. Louis Cardinals
- KBO: October 2, 2006, for the Kia Tigers
- NPB: September 1, 2009, for the Hiroshima Toyo Carp

MLB statistics
- Batting average: .217
- Home runs: 1
- Runs batted in: 10

KBO statistics
- Batting average: .163
- Home runs: 6
- Runs batted in: 14

NPB statistics
- Batting average: .258
- Home runs: 19
- Runs batted in: 64
- Stats at Baseball Reference

Former teams
- New York Yankees (2001); St. Louis Cardinals (2005); Kia Tigers (2006); Hiroshima Toyo Carp (2008–2009)

Scott Anthony Seabol (born May 17, 1975) is an American former professional baseball infielder. He played in Major League Baseball (MLB) for the New York Yankees and St. Louis Cardinals, in the KBO League for the Kia Tigers, and in Nippon Professional Baseball (NPB) for the Hiroshima Toyo Carp.

== Playing Career ==
Scott played junior college baseball at Allegany Community College and college baseball for the West Virginia Mountaineers. In high school, he played at South Allegheny Middle/Senior High School in Liberty Boro, Pennsylvania. He is one of five former Trojans to make it to the major leagues. The others are John Kruk, Joe Beimel, Stan Belinda, and Steve Kline.

Seabol was drafted by the New York Yankees in the 88th round of the 1996 Major League Baseball draft. When he made his major league debut with the Yankees in 2001, he became the lowest drafted player ever to make it all the way to the major leagues. That record has since been broken by other players.

Seabol made his major league debut on April 8, 2001, with the Yankees, but only for a single game. After a short time in the Milwaukee Brewers farm system, he signed with the St. Louis Cardinals on May 27, 2003, and was assigned to their Triple-A affiliate, the Memphis Redbirds in the Pacific Coast League. After an injury to Scott Rolen, Seabol was promoted from Memphis and played several positions with the Cardinals in a backup role, primarily third base. In 2006, he was signed by the Florida Marlins and invited to spring training as a non-roster invitee. Seabol was assigned to the Marlins' Triple-A affiliate, the Albuquerque Isotopes, in Albuquerque, New Mexico, in the Pacific Coast League. In early July of 2006, his contract was sold to the Kia Tigers of the KBO League, causing him to miss the Triple-A All-Star game, to which he had been selected. In December 2007, Seabol signed with the Hiroshima Toyo Carp of Nippon Professional Baseball for the 2008 season. His contract was not renewed by the Carp after the 2009 season, and he became a free agent.

== Coaching Career ==
=== New York Yankees ===
In 2017, Seabol was named as the hitting coach for the Pulaski Yankees the Low-A affiliate of the New York Yankees. In 2018, Seabol was moved up to be the hitting coach for the Charleston RiverDogs the Yankees Single-A affiliate before moving back to Pulaski for the 2019 season.

=== Miami Marlins ===
In 2021, Seabol was named hitting coach for the Pensacola Blue Wahoos the Double-A affiliate of the Miami Marlins.

=== Pittsburgh Pirates ===
In 2024, Seabol was named as the hitting coach for the Bradenton Marauders the Single-A affiliate of the Pittsburgh Pirates. In 2025, he was named hitting coach of the Altoona Curve the Pirates Double-A affiliate.

== Trivia ==
In 1999, Seabol had a 35-game hitting streak while a member of the minor league Greensboro Bats, then affiliated with the New York Yankees. It was the fourth-longest in minor league history.
