= Jesse James (tight end) =

American football player (born 1994)

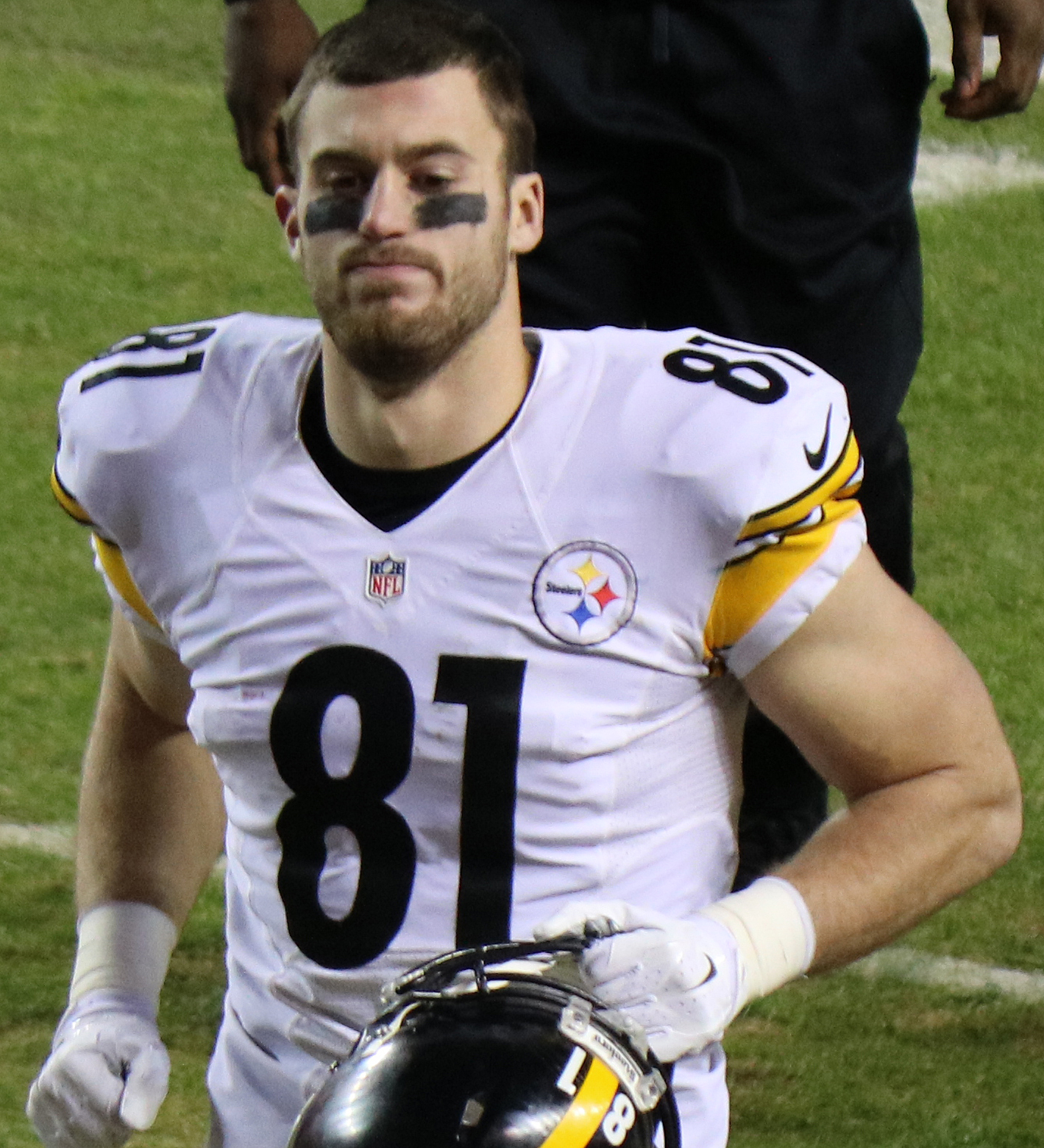
- James with the Pittsburgh Steelers in 2015

No. 81, 83, 18
- Position: Tight end

Personal information
- Born: June 4, 1994 (age 32); Glassport, Pennsylvania, U.S.
- Listed height: 6 ft 7 in (2.01 m)
- Listed weight: 261 lb (118 kg)

Career information
- High school: South Allegheny (Glassport)
- College: Penn State (2012–2014)
- NFL draft: 2015: 5th round, 160th overall pick

Career history
- Pittsburgh Steelers (2015–2018); Detroit Lions (2019–2020); Chicago Bears (2021); Cleveland Browns (2022); New Orleans Saints (2023)*; Las Vegas Raiders (2023)*
- * Offseason or practice squad member only

Career NFL statistics
- Receptions: 157
- Receiving yards: 1,522
- Receiving touchdowns: 12
- Stats at Pro Football Reference

Jesse Dylan James (born June 4, 1994) is an American former professional football player who was a tight end in the National Football League (NFL). He played college football for the Penn State Nittany Lions and was selected by the Pittsburgh Steelers in the fifth round of the 2015 NFL draft. James was also a member of the Detroit Lions, Chicago Bears, Cleveland Browns, New Orleans Saints, and Las Vegas Raiders.

== Early life ==
James attended South Allegheny Middle/Senior High School in Allegheny County, Pennsylvania. where he was a two-time Second-team All-State selection in both football and basketball. James was named First-team All-Century Conference as a tight end for both his junior and senior seasons. Over the two seasons, James recorded 71 receptions for 1,030 yards and 10 touchdowns. For his final three seasons, James was named a team captain. He was invited to play in the Semper-Fidelis All-American game. James was also named to the 2011 Pittsburgh Post-Gazette Fabulous 22.

MaxPreps rated James as the nation's No. 3 tight end as a senior. He was rated by Rivals.com as a three-star recruit. James committed to Penn State University to play college football.

== College career ==
James began attending Penn State in 2012. He played in 12 games as a true freshman in 2012, with six starts. James recorded 15 receptions for 276 yards and tied a school record with five receiving touchdowns by a tight end.

As a sophomore in 2013, James started all 12 games and recorded 25 receptions for 333 yards and three touchdowns.

As a junior season in 2014, James broke the school's record for career touchdowns by a tight end, passing Ted Kwalick's 10. For the season, James recorded 38 receptions for 396 yards and three touchdowns.

After his junior season, James entered the 2015 NFL draft. He finished his collegiate career with 76 receptions for 1,005 yards and 11 touchdowns.

== Professional career ==
=== Pre-draft ===
Coming out of Penn State, James was projected to be drafted anywhere from the fourth to sixth round by the majority of NFL analysts and scouts. He received an invitation to the NFL Combine and completed all of the required drills and positional workouts. On March 19, 2015, James attended Penn State's annual Pro Day and succeeded in lowering his times in the 40, 20, and 10-yard dash from the combine. James also performed positional drills for representatives and scouts from 19 NFL teams, who attended to scout James, Donovan Smith, Adrian Amos, and eight other Penn State players. He was ranked the fifth best tight end prospect available in the 2015 NFL draft by NFLDraftScout.com and was ranked the 13th best tight end by NFL analyst Charles Davis.

Pre-draft measurables
Height	Weight	Arm length	Hand span	Wingspan	40-yard dash	10-yard split	20-yard split	20-yard shuttle	Three-cone drill	Vertical jump	Broad jump	Bench press
6 ft 7 in (2.01 m)	261 lb (118 kg)	33 in (0.84 m)	9 3/8 in (0.24 m)	6 ft 8 7/8 in (2.05 m)	4.69 s	1.69 s	2.78 s	4.50 s	7.53 s	37.5 in (0.95 m)	10 ft 1 in (3.07 m)	26 reps
All values from NFL Scouting Combine/Pro Day

=== Pittsburgh Steelers ===
James was selected by the Pittsburgh Steelers in the fifth round with the 160th overall pick in the 2015 NFL draft. On May 14, 2015, the Steelers signed James to a four-year, $2.48 million rookie contract with $218,912 guaranteed. On November 8, 2015, James made his professional regular season debut and caught two passes for 13 yards and also scored his first touchdown on a four-yard reception in a 38–35 victory over the Oakland Raiders. James finished his rookie year with eight receptions for 56 yards and a touchdown in eight games and two starts.

The following season in 2016, with Heath Miller retired, and newly signed free agent Ladarius Green on injured reserve, James became the starting tight end to begin the season. He finished his second professional season with 39 receptions for 338 yards and three touchdowns in 16 games and 13 starts. On January 8, 2017, James started in his first career postseason game and caught one pass for nine yards as the Steelers defeated the Miami Dolphins 30–12 in the AFC Wild Card Round.

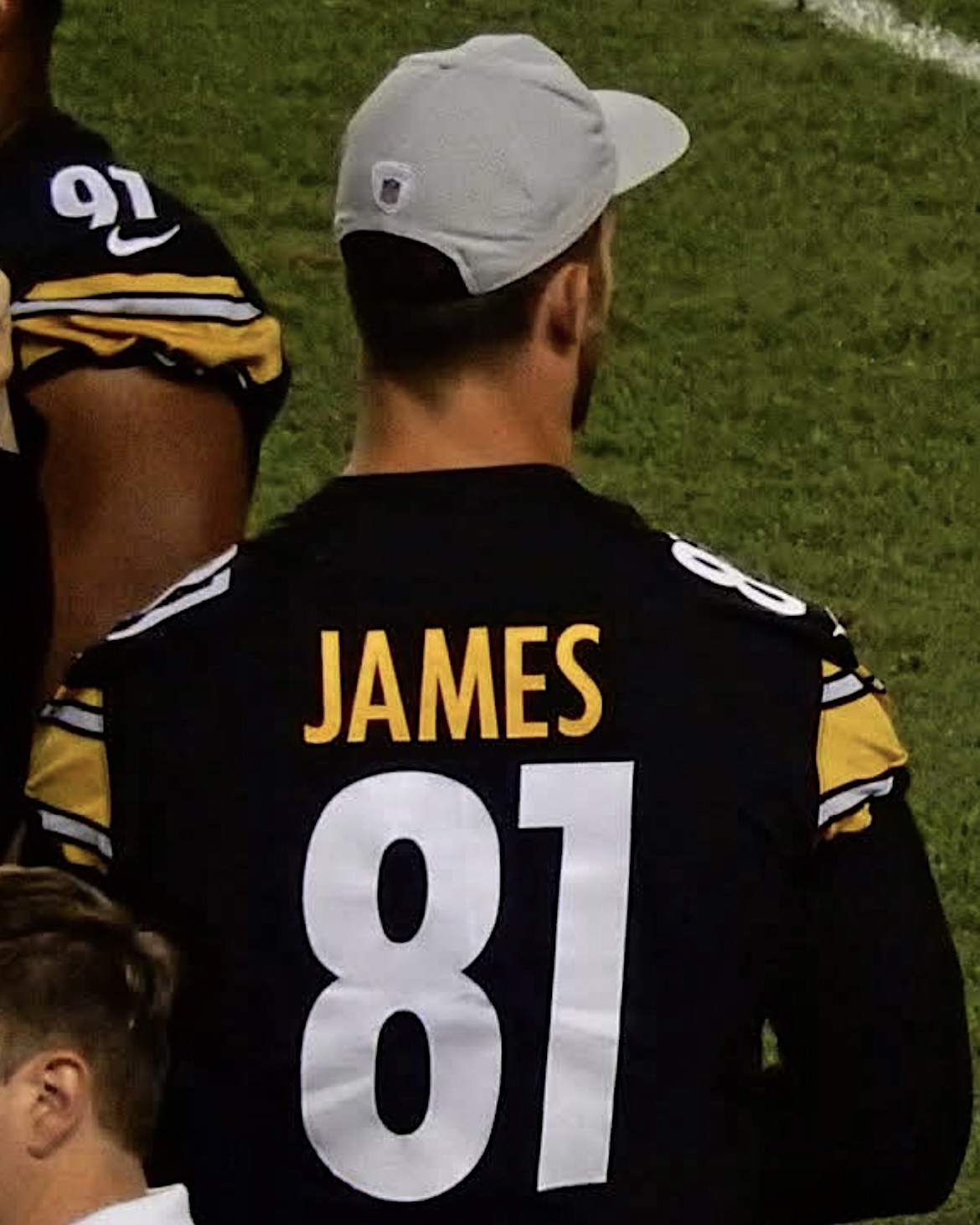
James in 2017

James began the 2017 regular season as the Steeler's de facto starting tight end ahead of Vance McDonald. On September 10, in the season opening 21–18 victory over the Cleveland Browns, James had six receptions for 41 yards and two touchdowns for his first career multi-touchdown game. During Week 15 against the New England Patriots, he caught a potential game-winning touchdown, but after review, it was overturned when officials ruled that James lost control as the ball hit the ground. The controversial moment loomed large as Ben Roethlisberger threw an interception two plays later, resulting in the Steelers losing 27–24 and giving the Patriots another AFC East title and eventual #1-seed. James finished the 2017 season with 43 receptions for 372 yards and three touchdowns in 16 games and 14 starts.

During Week 2 of the 2018 season, against the Kansas City Chiefs, James had five receptions for a career-high 138 yards and a touchdown in the 42–37 loss. He played in 16 games with seven starts, recording 30 receptions for 423 yards and two touchdowns.

=== Detroit Lions ===
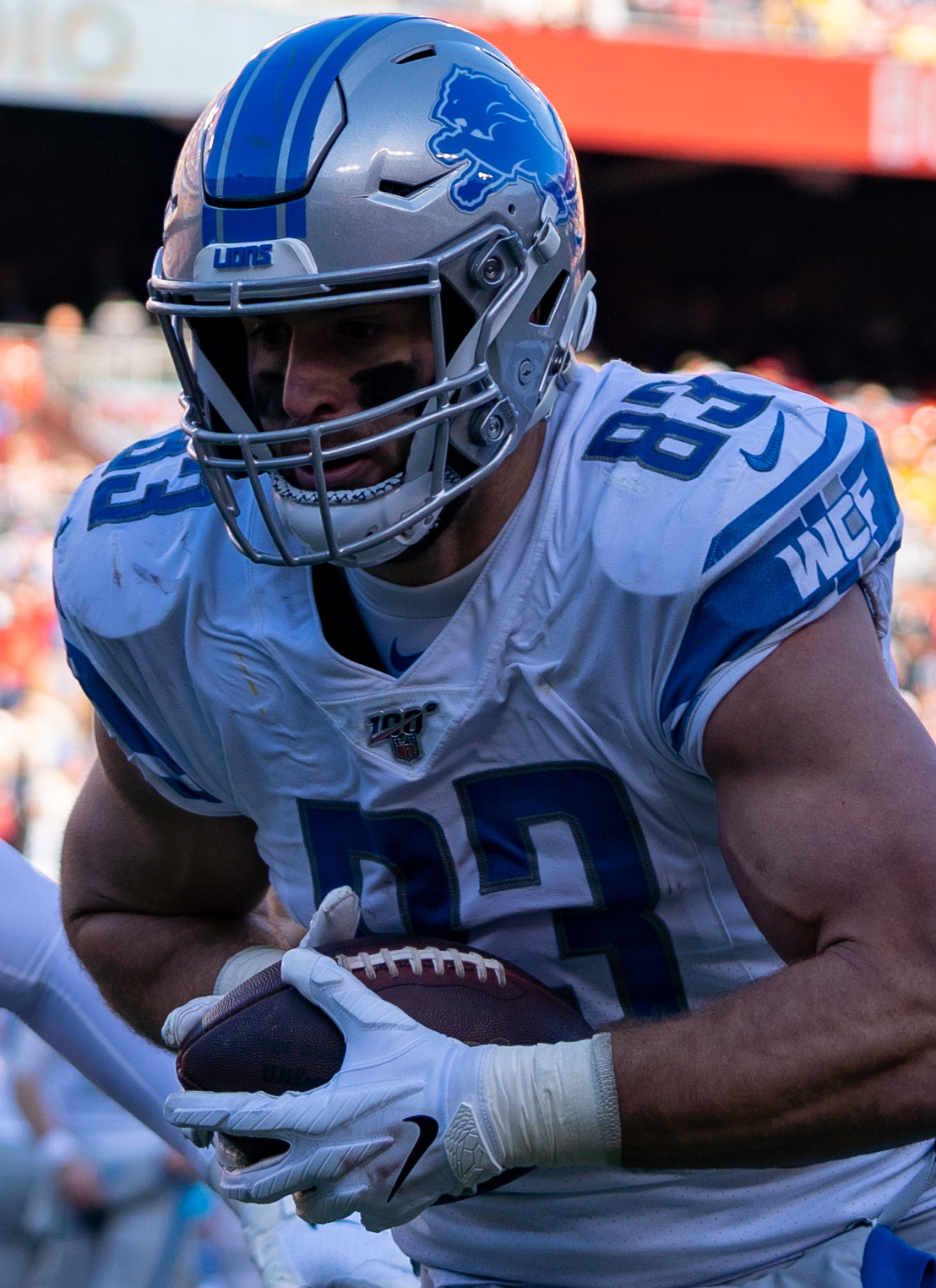
James in 2019

On March 14, 2019, James signed a four-year, $22.6 million contract with the Detroit Lions. In the 2019 season, he appeared in all 16 games and recorded 16 receptions for 142 yards in 16 games and 10 starts.

In the 2020 season, James had 14 receptions for 129 yards and two touchdowns in 16 games and 10 starts. He was released on March 12, 2021.

=== Chicago Bears ===
On July 25, 2021, James signed a one-year deal with the Chicago Bears. In the 2021 season, he had seven receptions for 62 yards and a touchdown in 14 games and nine starts.

=== Cleveland Browns ===
On September 5, 2022, James signed with the Cleveland Browns. He was placed on injured reserve on September 20. James appeared in two games in the 2022 season and recorded no statistics.

=== New Orleans Saints ===
On May 31, 2023, James signed with the New Orleans Saints. He was released on August 29 as a part of the team's final roster cuts.

=== Las Vegas Raiders ===
On November 8, 2023, James was signed to the practice squad of the Las Vegas Raiders. He was released on November 21.

== Career statistics ==
=== NFL ===
Legend
**Bold**	Career high

==== Regular season ====
Year	Team	Games		Receiving					Fumbles	
Year	Team	GP	GS	Rec	Yds	Avg	Lng	TD	Fum	Lost
2015	PIT	8	2	8	56	7.0	20	1	0	0
2016	PIT	16	13	39	338	8.7	24	**3**	0	0
2017	PIT	16	14	**43**	372	8.7	32	**3**	0	0
2018	PIT	16	7	30	**423**	**14.1**	**51**	2	0	0
2019	DET	16	10	16	142	8.9	23	0	0	0
2020	DET	16	10	16	129	9.2	31	2	0	0
2021	CHI	14	9	7	62	8.9	19	1	0	0
2022	CLE	2	0	0	0	0.0	0	0	0	0
Career		104	63	157	1,522	9.7	51	12	0	0

==== Postseason ====
Year	Team	Games		Receiving					Fumbles	
Year	Team	GP	GS	Rec	Yds	Avg	Lng	TD	Fum	Lost
2015	PIT	2	0	1	22	**22.0**	22	0	0	0
2016	PIT	3	3	**11**	**137**	12.5	**26**	0	0	0
2017	PIT	1	0	1	12	12.0	12	0	0	0
Career		6	3	13	171	9.7	26	0	0	0

=== College ===
Season	Team	GP	Receiving			
Season	Team	GP	Rec	Yds	Avg	TD
2012	Penn State	10	15	276	**18.4**	**5**
2013	Penn State	10	25	333	13.3	3
2014	Penn State	13	**38**	**396**	10.4	3
Career		33	78	1,005	12.9	11
