= Bernard Novak =

American politician

Bernard R. Novak

Member of the Pennsylvania House of Representatives from the 38th district
- In office 1969–1980
- Preceded by: District created
- Succeeded by: Richard Olasz

Personal details
- Born: August 3, 1919 Duquesne, Pennsylvania
- Died: March 11, 2010 (aged 90) West Mifflin, Pennsylvania
- Party: Democratic

Bernard R. Novak (August 3, 1919 – March 11, 2010) was a Democratic member of the Pennsylvania House of Representatives.
