= Nick Pisciottano =

American politician

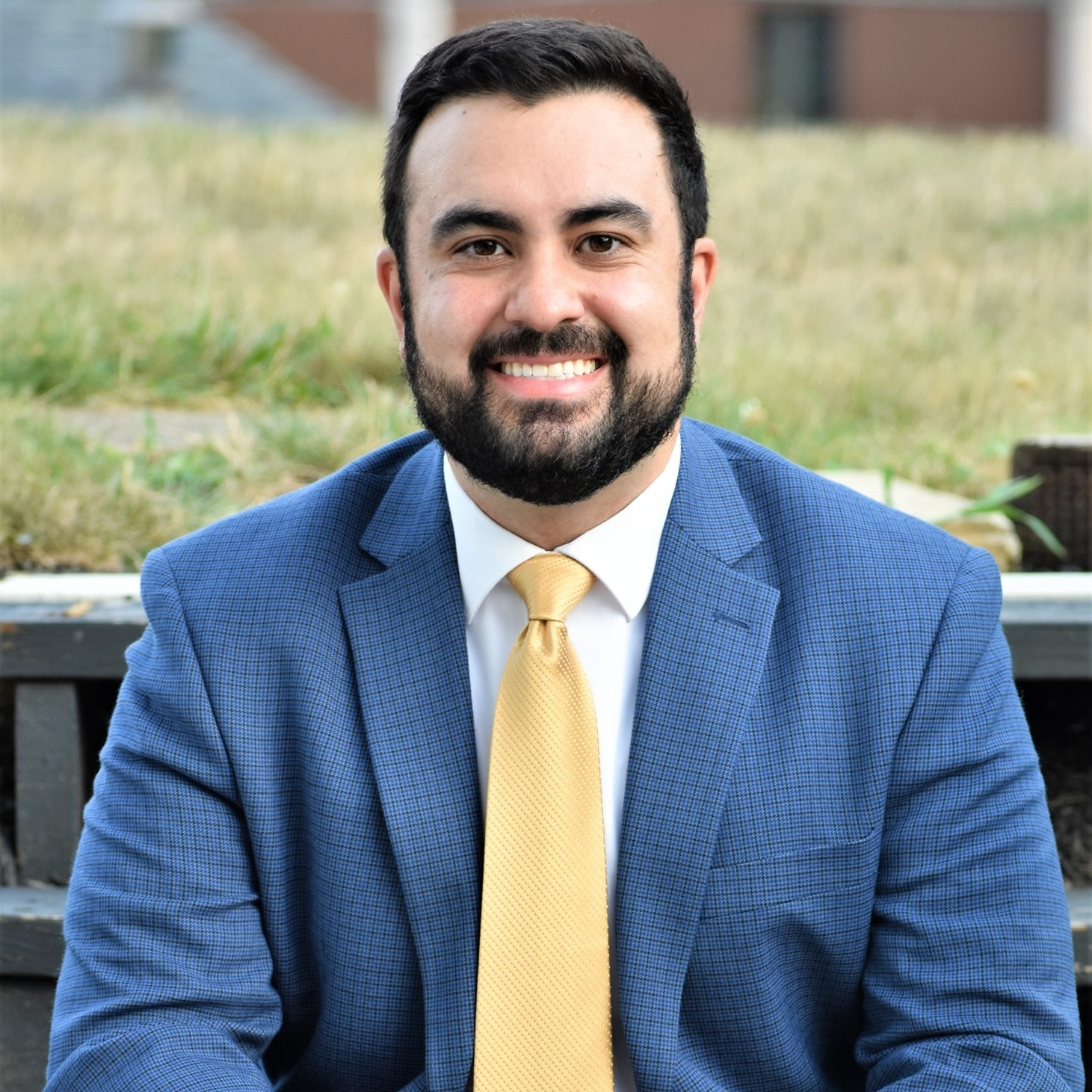

Member of the Pennsylvania Senate from the 45th district
- Incumbent
- Assumed office January 7, 2025
- Preceded by: Jim Brewster

Member of the Pennsylvania House of Representatives from the 38th district
- In office January 5, 2021 – November 30, 2024
- Preceded by: William C. Kortz
- Succeeded by: John Inglis

Personal details
- Pronunciation: Pis-ah-tan-oh
- Party: Democratic
- Spouse: Molly Pisciottano
- Education: Washington and Jefferson; Johns Hopkins University
- Website: palegis.us

Nickolas R. Pisciottano (born January 12, 1990) is an American elected official serving as a member of the Pennsylvania State Senate for the 45th District. He was first elected in 2024.

== Education ==
Pisciottano graduated as class valedictorian from West Mifflin Area High School before earning bachelor's degrees in Accounting and History from Washington & Jefferson College. He later earned a master's degree in Government Analytics from Johns Hopkins University. While at Hopkins, his research focused on the concept of social capital culminating is his capstone thesis, “The Impact of the Internet on Social Capital: Broadband Access and Influences on Voting Turnout.”

== Career ==
After graduation from Washington & Jefferson, Nick worked as an auditor at KPMG earning his Certified Public Accountant license in 2014. Outside of his professional career, Nick was active in his community volunteering as the president of the West Mifflin Community Foundation and as a student mentor with Big Brothers, Big Sisters of Greater Pittsburgh.

=== State Representative ===
In 2020, Pisciottano was elected to the Pennsylvania House of Representatives for the 38th District succeeding the retiring Rep. William C. Kortz. His campaign focused on protecting workers’ rights, economic development, education reform, and providing high-quality constituent services.

In 2022, Pisciottano was reelected to the 38th District unopposed. Pisciottano served as the Chair of the 16-member Allegheny County House Delegation from 2022 until 2024. He served on the Consumer Protection, Transportation, Commerce, and Labor & Industry committees during the 2023-2024 legislative session. Pisciottano passed a number of pieces of legislation through the House including bills that cracked down on junk fees, amended the Pennsylvania constitution to protect workers’ rights, establishing Pennsylvania’s first anti-trust statute ever, enhanced protections for hotel workers, and establish a medical debt forgiveness program. His legislation to extend lemon law to motorcycles and expand workers compensation direct deposit were signed into law by Governor Josh Shapiro.

==== Committee assignments ====
- Commerce
- Consumer Protection, Technology & Utilities
- Labor & Industry
- Transportation

=== State Senator ===
In January 2024, Rep. Pisciottano announced that he would not be seeking reelection to the 38th District and would instead run to replace retiring State Senator Jim Brewster in the 45th Senatorial District.

In 2024, after winning a primary election, Pisciottano went on to defeat republican Jen Dintini in the November 2024 general election by a margin of 69,248 (53%) to 61,189 (47%) and was elected to the Pennsylvania State Senate.

For the 2025-2026 Session, Pisciottano serves on the following committees in the State Senate:

- Finance (Minority Chair)
- Consumer Protection & Professional Licensure
- Labor & Industry
- Veterans Affairs & Emergency Preparedness

During the 2025-2026 Legislative Session, Pisciottano passed seven bills into law as a lead sponsor including a landmark law requiring disclosure for advertising using artificial intelligence, making Pennsylvania one of the first states in the nation to protect its residents from deceptive AI ads. Other legislative accomplishments included: requiring automated external defibrillators (AEDs) at utility worksites to protect lineworkers from sudden cardiac events after exposure to electric shocks, changes to Pennsylvania's certified public accountant licensing law, updates to financial reporting requirements for nonprofit organizations, creating new licensing standards for medical imaging professionals, and legislation to allow for the conveyance of property used for the continued construction of the Mon-Fayette Expressway. Pisciottano also introduced legislation to expand paid parental leave, expand healthcare access, combat junk fees, regulate license plate reader technology, outlaw dynamic pricing for essential goods, and regulate the pet cremation industry.

Pisciottano also was one of the co-founders of the Pennsylvania Kids and Family Caucus, which focuses on, "a platform to elevate family-focused legislation."

== Personal life ==
Pisciottano was born and raised in West Mifflin, Pennsylvania hailing from a family that settled in the area before the Civil War. He married his wife Molly in 2018 and they live together with their three children in West Mifflin. Pisciottano's cousin, John Inglis, succeeded him in the State House.
