= Dan Kecman =

American football player (born 1948)

No. 45
- Position: Linebacker

Personal information
- Born: June 10, 1948; Pittsburgh, Pennsylvania, U.S.
- Listed height: 6 ft 2 in (1.88 m)
- Listed weight: 230 lb (104 kg)

Career information
- High school: North (West Mifflin, Pennsylvania)
- College: Maryland
- NFL draft: 1970: undrafted

Career history
- New England Patriots (1970); Denver Broncos (1971)*; Cincinnati Bengals (1971)*
- * Offseason or practice squad member only

Career NFL statistics
- Games played: 1
- Stats at Pro Football Reference

Daniel S. Kecman Jr. (born June 10, 1948) is an American former professional football player who was a linebacker for one season for the New England Patriots of the National Football League (NFL). He also was with the Denver Broncos and Cincinnati Bengals but did not play. He played college football for the Maryland Terrapins.

== Early life and education ==
Kecman was born on June 10, 1948, in Pittsburgh, Pennsylvania. He went to North High School in West Mifflin, Pennsylvania, before attending University of Maryland. While at Maryland, he played football. He did not play football in his first year of college. In his second year, he played as a starter on their defense as Maryland finished without a single win. The next season, Kecman started in seven of the ten games, but was injured for the two wins that Maryland had. He would only win a game in the final game of his senior year, where Maryland won against Virginia, 17–14.

== Professional career ==
Kecman was signed as an undrafted free agent following the 1970 NFL draft by the New England Patriots. He only made one appearance with the team, in a 27–14 win over the Miami Dolphins. The next year he signed with the Denver Broncos but was waived. His final team was the Cincinnati Bengals, but he did not make any appearances.
