= Kecman =

Kecman is a surname. Notable people with the surname include:

- Dan Kecman (born 1948), American footballer
- Dušan Kecman (born 1977), Serbian basketball executive, coach, and player
- Momir Kecman (born 1940), Serbian former wrestler
