= Sean Logan =

American politician (born 1970)

Sean F. Logan

Member of the Pennsylvania Senate from the 45th district
- In office January 2, 2001 – August 24, 2010
- Preceded by: Albert Belan
- Succeeded by: Jim Brewster

Personal details
- Born: May 26, 1970 (age 56) Pitcairn, Pennsylvania
- Party: Democratic
- Spouse: Shannon Logan
- Education: University of Pittsburgh
- Occupation: Pennsylvania Gaming Control Board

Sean F. Logan (born May 26, 1970, Pitcairn, Pennsylvania) is a Democratic politician and former member of the Pennsylvania State Senate who represented the 45th District from 2001 until his resignation on August 24, 2010, to accept a job at the University of Pittsburgh Medical Center.
