= Jim Cope (American football) =

American football player (1953–1998)

No. 51
- Position: Linebacker

Personal information
- Born: June 23, 1953; Oil City, Pennsylvania, U.S.
- Died: September 12, 1998 (aged 45)
- Listed height: 6 ft 1 in (1.85 m)
- Listed weight: 235 lb (107 kg)

Career information
- High school: South Allegheny
- College: Ohio State
- NFL draft: 1975: 5th round, 119th overall pick

Career history
- Cleveland Browns (1975)*; Montreal Alouettes (1975); Denver Broncos (1976)*; Atlanta Falcons (1976)
- * Offseason or practice squad member only

Awards and highlights
- 2× Second-team All-Big Ten (1973, 1974)

Career NFL statistics
- Games played: 6
- Stats at Pro Football Reference

James Charles Cope (June 23, 1953 – September 12, 1998) was an American professional football linebacker. After playing college football for the Ohio State Buckeyes, he played for the Montreal Alouettes in 1975 and for the Atlanta Falcons in 1976.
