= Dead Man's Hollow =

Conservation area

- Location within Pennsylvania
- Location: Elizabeth Township, Liberty Borough, and Lincoln Borough, Pennsylvania, United States
- Coordinates: 40.31896°N 79.85477°W
- Governing body: Allegheny Land Trust

Dead Man's Hollow is a 450 acre conservation area located along the Youghiogheny River just south of the City of McKeesport, Pennsylvania. The conservation area spans three municipalities which include Liberty Borough, Lincoln Borough, and Elizabeth Township. The property is owned and managed by Allegheny Land Trust and is open year round to the public for educational and recreational purposes.

== Conservation area ==
Dead Man's Hollow was established as a conservation area in 1996 and is considered to be the largest privately protected area in Allegheny County.

Since the mid 1990s, volunteers from Allegheny Land Trust and other non-profit conservation groups based in the Pittsburgh region have made significant progress in removing trash and debris as well as invasive plant species from the property. This continued effort has allowed the area to return to a lush green wonderland beneath a canopy of native hardwoods.

The Dead Man's Hollow conservation area is also the home to a variety of Pennsylvania wildlife including twenty-four different species of birds.

In January 2017, the Pennsylvania Department of Conservation and Natural Resources designated the area as a Wild Plant Sanctuary.

== Industrial history ==
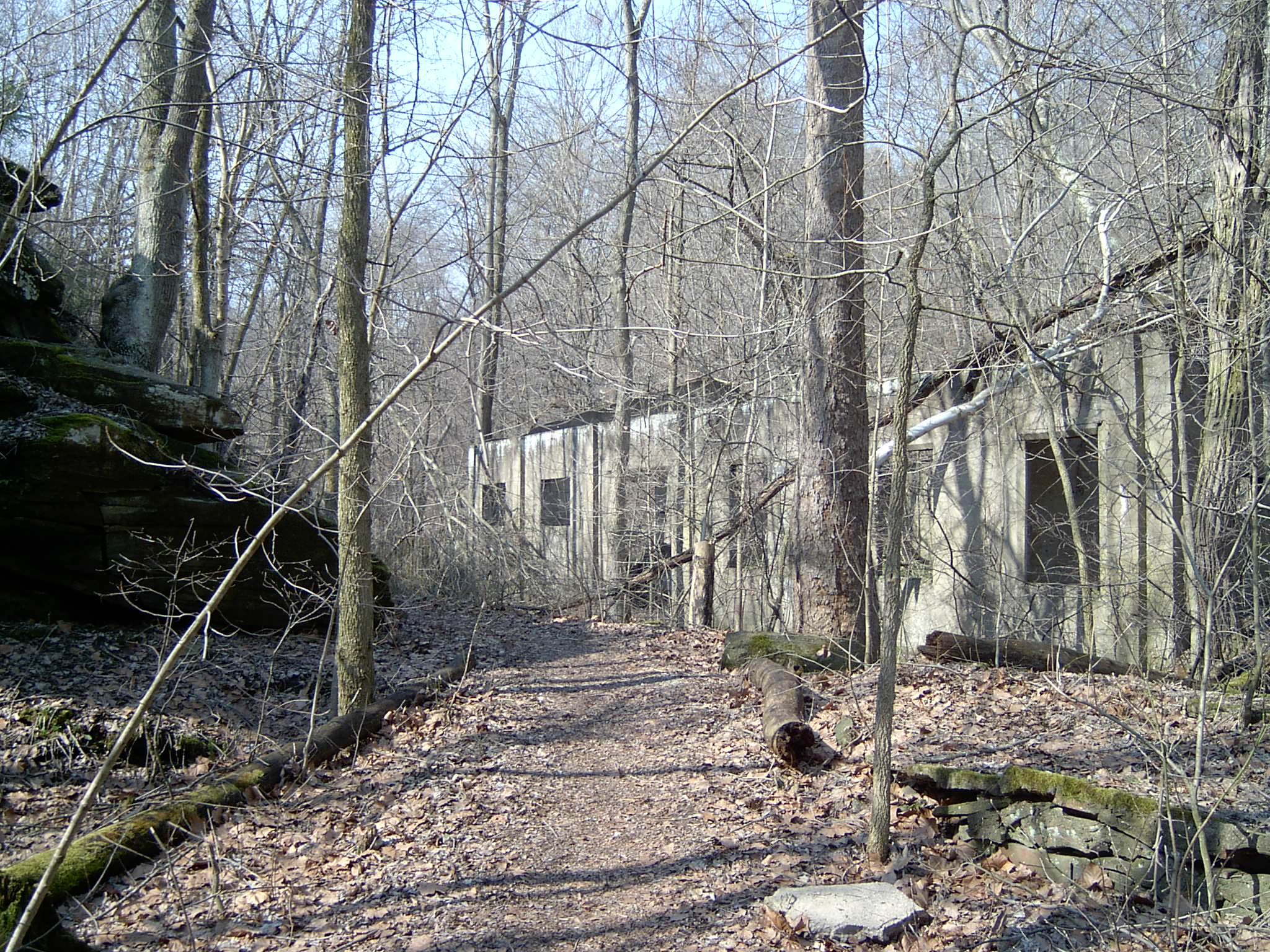
The Boiler House ruins of the Union Sewer Pipe Company in Dead Man's Hollow.

The remnants of two industrial businesses that once thrived in the McKeesport area, the Bowman Brickyard and the Union Sewer Pipe Company, can also be found throughout the Dead Man's Hollow conservation area. Operations for both companies began in the late 1880s and lasted until a fire in 1920. A number of the established hiking trails give visitors the unique opportunity to "step back in time" while exploring the "factory ruins". Among the most visited locations at the former industrial site are the large circular foundations of kiln ovens that were used in the pipe making process as well as the decaying graffiti covered walls of the company's boiler house. Other notable locations are the slightly curved wall of a former P≤ Railroad siding and an oversized drainage tunnel leading to the Youghiogheny River.

== Haunted history ==
As the story goes, Dead Man's Hollow earned its dismal name in 1874 when a group of adolescent boys were roaming through the hollow and came upon a decomposed body that was hanging by a noose. The victim was never identified and no one was ever charged for the murder. Soon the natural isolation of the hollow became the setting for other dark tales of criminal acts and untimely deaths. From suspicious drownings and violent gunfights to tragic explosions and lightning strikes, Dead Man's Hollow has been the scene of many grisly incidents and accidents. Supposedly one or more of these bizarre tales have prompted quite a few encounters with the unknown in the secluded hollow. Visitors to the site often return with unexplainable stories involving a shadowy presence, strange odors, and even the sound of voices when no one else was near.

== Recreation ==
With over eight miles of hiking trails throughout Dead Man's Hollow, visitors can easily spend an entire day (or night) exploring the conservation area. And with its close proximity to the Great Allegheny Passage bike trail, Dead Man's Hollow has become a welcome place for cyclists to stop and relax for a few minutes.

According to the Allegheny Land trust website, Open Hunting is permitted on this property as long as individuals apply for a free permit before hunting on any conservation area. It has also been suggested that anyone wishing to use the property for hunting purposes be familiar with the established trail system and avoid the areas where human interaction is likely.

== Media history ==
Over the years, the stories of Dead Man's Hollow have been featured in numerous articles printed in the McKeesport Daily News and the Pittsburgh Post Gazette.

In 2000, many of Dead Man's Hollow's tales made their debut in book format thanks to a former resident of Lincoln Borough named Karen Frank. With the help of the community, Frank compiled a number of old photographs and stories about the history of Dead Man's Hollow. Not long after the book Dead Man's Hollow : An Oral History and More was released in limited quantity and quickly sold out. Today, copies of the out-of-print publication can be found at the McKeesport Public Library and the Jefferson Hills Public Library.

Dead Man's Hollow returned to the pages of another book in 2009 when History Press released Legends & Lore of Western Pennsylvania. Written by folklore historian Thomas White, this particular book has been hailed by many as the best source of information on every ghostly legend that calls Dead Man's Hollow home.

In 2010, Dead Man's Hollow received its very own website which offered an extensive timeline that chronicled the hollow's dark history, detailed trail maps, and plenty of vintage photographs. The website was created and operated by Stephen Bosnyak of McKeesport. In 2015, the website merged with another website, Popular Pittsburgh.

Throughout the summer of 2012, the McKeesport Regional History & Heritage Center featured an exhibit that showcased Dead Man's Hollow. Displays included actual brick and clay pipe remnants recovered from the site, a vintage photo collection, and even a scale model of the Union Sewer Pipe Company.
