= Jim Brewster =

American politician (born 1947/48)

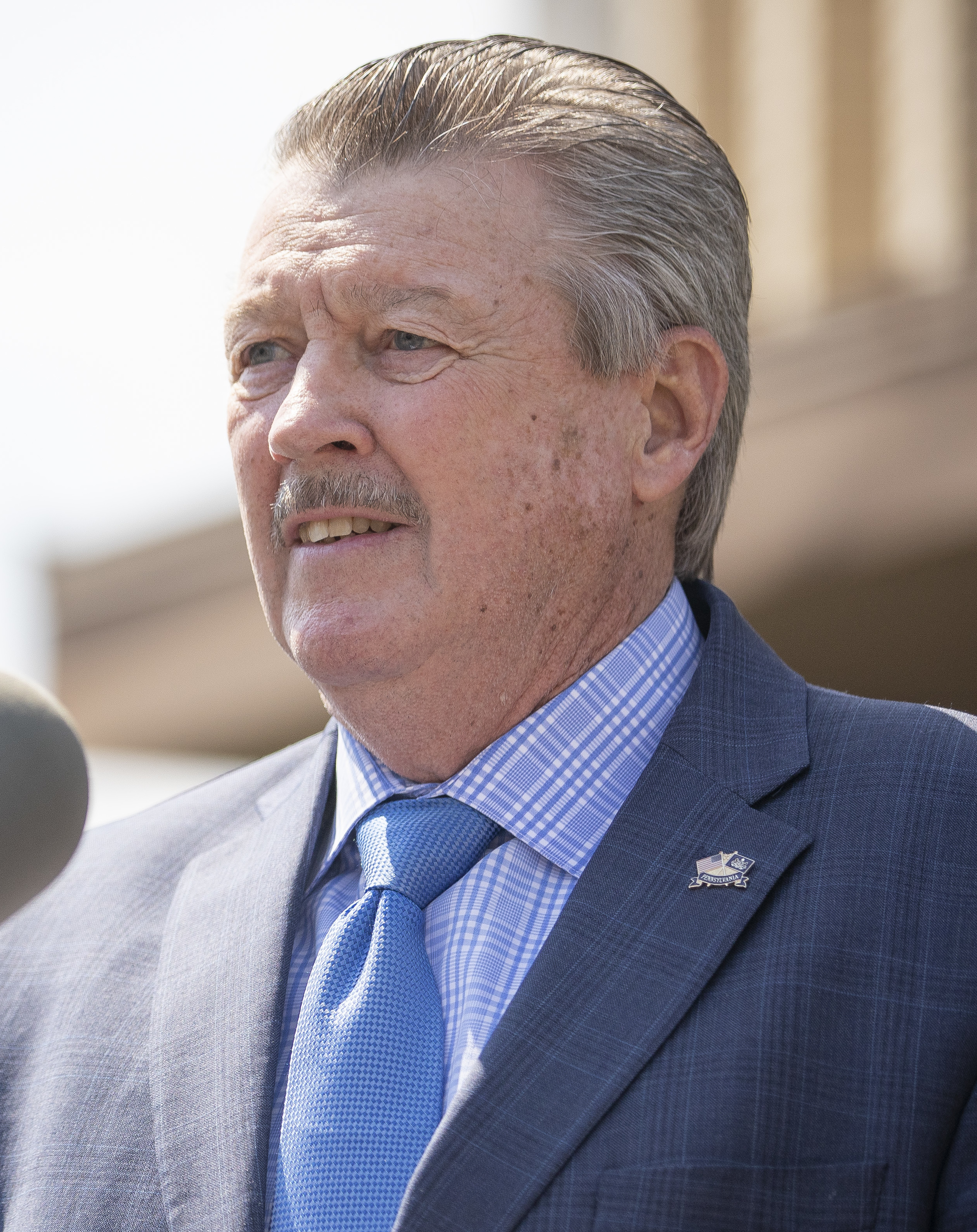

Member of the Pennsylvania Senate from the 45th district
- In office November 17, 2010 – November 30, 2024
- Preceded by: Sean Logan
- Succeeded by: Nick Pisciottano

Personal details
- Born: 1947 or 1948 (age 77–78) Pittsburgh, Pennsylvania, U.S.
- Party: Democratic

James R. Brewster is an American politician who served as a member of the Pennsylvania Senate for the 45th District from 2010 to 2024.

== Education ==
Brewster earned a Bachelor of Arts degree in education from the California University of Pennsylvania.

== Career ==
Brewster is a former vice president for fraud management with Mellon Bank and mayor of McKeesport, Pennsylvania.

On November 2, 2010, Brewster won a special election to fill the remaining term of Senator Sean F. Logan, who had resigned his seat on August 24, 2010, to take a position at the University of Pittsburgh Medical Center. Brewster was sworn into the Pennsylvania Senate on November 17, 2010.

In July 2020, Brewster organized a meeting with bar and restaurant owners and signed a letter to Governor Tom Wolf urging him to lessen the restrictions on them imposed during the COVID-19 pandemic.

He announced that he would not seek re-election to his seat in 2024.

=== 2020 election ===
In January 2021, although Brewster narrowly defeated his opponent, Republican Nicole Ziccarelli, by 69 votes, the Republican-led State Senate refused to swear in Brewster for his fourth term, despite the fact that his win had already been certified by state officials. Lieutenant Governor John Fetterman attempted to swear Brewster in. In a bizarre move, Republican leaders voted to remove Fetterman from his presiding role and halt Brewster's seating. Senator Jake Corman, when reading out names of the new and re-elected senators, intentionally omitted Brewster's, with Republicans once again voting to confirm the disruptive action.

After a federal court ruling re-affirmed his win over Ziccarelli, Brewster was sworn in on January 13, 2021.
