= South Allegheny School District =

School district in Pennsylvania, United States

Address
- 2743 Washington Blvd. McKeesport, Allegheny, Pennsylvania, 15133; United States

District information
- Type: Public
- Grades: K-12
- Established: 1966

Students and staff
- Students: 1429
- District mascot: Gladiator
- Colors: Blue & gold

Other information
- Website: www.southallegheny.org

South Allegheny School District is a suburban, public school district located in Allegheny County, Pennsylvania. It serves the Pittsburgh suburbs of Port Vue, Liberty, Glassport, and Lincoln. South Allegheny School District encompasses approximately 9 square miles. According to 2000 federal census data, it serves a resident population of 13,109. In 2009 the district residents' Per capita income was $16,590, while the median family income was $38,949.

== Schools ==
- South Allegheny Middle/Senior High School
- South Allegheny Elementary School
- South Allegheny Early Childhood Center
