= Edward Zemprelli =

American politician

Edward P. Zemprelli

Democratic Leader of the Pennsylvania Senate
- In office January 2, 1979 – November 30, 1988
- Preceded by: Henry Messinger
- Succeeded by: Bob Mellow

Member of the Pennsylvania Senate from the 45th district
- In office January 7, 1969 – November 30, 1988
- Preceded by: Joseph Gaydos
- Succeeded by: Albert Belan
- Constituency: Parts of Allegheny, Washington, and Westmoreland Counties

Member of the Pennsylvania House of Representatives from the Allegheny County district
- In office November 5, 1963 – November 30, 1968

Personal details
- Born: May 11, 1925 Clairton, Pennsylvania
- Died: December 4, 2017 (aged 92) Jupiter, Florida
- Party: Democratic
- Spouse: Margaret
- Children: 1 child

Edward P. Zemprelli (May 11, 1925 – December 4, 2017) was a Democratic member of the Pennsylvania State Senate and the Pennsylvania House of Representatives.

A native of Clairton, Pennsylvania, Zemprelli grew up in an Italian American Catholic family. He earned a degree from Pennsylvania State University, where he was a member of the debate team and worked on the chain crew for Penn State Nittany Lions football games. He earned a law degree from University of Pittsburgh School of Law in 1949 and was licensed to practice law in 1950. His legal practice focused mainly on general practice, and later estate planning, real estate, and government relations.

He was elected to represent Allegheny County in the Pennsylvania House of Representatives in a special election on November 5, 1963. He held that position until he was elected to represent the 45th senatorial district in the Pennsylvania Senate, a position he held from 1969 to 1988. During his political career, he held prominent positions on the Business and Commerce Committee, where he helped pass reform of the state's banking laws and the unemployment fund. He served as a trustee of Penn State University from 1978 to 1996, as well as a trustee of University of Pittsburgh. Zemprelli died on December 4, 2017, in Jupiter, Florida.
