= Richard Olasz =

American politician (1930–2010)

Richard D. Olasz

Member of the Pennsylvania House of Representatives from the 38th district
- In office 1981–1998
- Preceded by: Bernard Novak
- Succeeded by: Kenneth Ruffing

Personal details
- Born: June 14, 1930 Homestead, Pennsylvania, U.S.
- Died: April 8, 2010 (aged 79) Pittsburgh, Pennsylvania, U.S.
- Party: Democratic

Richard D. Olasz (June 14, 1930 – April 8, 2010) was a former Democratic member of the Pennsylvania House of Representatives.
