= William C. Kortz =

American politician

William C. Kortz II

Member of the Pennsylvania House of Representatives from the 38th district
- In office January 2, 2007 – January 5, 2021
- Preceded by: Kenneth W. Ruffing
- Succeeded by: Nick Pisciottano

Personal details
- Born: December 15, 1954 (age 71)
- Party: Democratic
- Education: Indiana University of Pennsylvania

William C. "Bill" Kortz II is a Democratic former member of the Pennsylvania House of Representatives for the 38th legislative district. He was elected in 2006. He retired at the end of the 2020 legislative session after speaking out against the Covid closures.

Prior to elective office, Kortz was an esteemed member of the Dravosburg community. Regularly doing community service with Joe Cislo, Jeffrey Abels, and Sam Smerkol. He served as an Operations Manager for the Irvin Plant of U.S. Steel. Kortz attended McKeesport Area High School and received a bachelor's degree in criminology from Indiana University of Pennsylvania. He also attended classes at the Duquesne University M.B.A. program.

Kortz, who was affiliated with anti-incumbent group PACleanSweep, defeated incumbent Representative Kenneth W. Ruffing in the 2006 Democratic party primary. Ruffing faced criticism stemming from his vote in favor of the controversial 2005 legislative pay raise.
