= Joseph M. Gaydos =

American politician

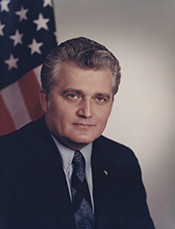

Member of the U.S. House of Representatives from Pennsylvania's 20th district
- In office November 5, 1968 – January 3, 1993
- Preceded by: Elmer Holland
- Succeeded by: Austin Murphy

Member of the Pennsylvania Senate from the 45th district
- In office January 2, 1967 – November 5, 1968
- Preceded by: Leonard Staisey
- Succeeded by: Edward Zemprelli

Personal details
- Born: Joseph Matthew Gaydos; July 3, 1926 Braddock, Pennsylvania, U.S.
- Died: February 7, 2015 (aged 88) Elizabeth Township, Allegheny County, Pennsylvania, U.S.
- Party: Democratic
- Spouse(s): Alice Ann Gaydos (née Gray; died March 19, 2001)

Joseph Matthew Gaydos (July 3, 1926 – February 7, 2015) was an American lawyer, World War II veteran, and Democratic member of the U.S. House of Representatives from Pennsylvania, serving 8 terms from 1968 to 1992. Gaydos was the first Slovak American to serve in the United States Congress.

== Early life and education ==
Gaydos was born in Braddock, Pennsylvania. His parents were called John and Elona Magella Gaydos and were born in Slovakia.

He attended Duquesne University and graduated from the University of Notre Dame Law School in 1951.

=== World War II ===
He served during World War II in the Pacific theater with the United States Navy Reserve from 1944 to 1946.

== Political career ==
He served in the Pennsylvania State Senate from 1967 to 1968. He served as Deputy Attorney General of Pennsylvania, Assistant Solicitor of Allegheny County, and general counsel to United Mine Workers of America, district five.

=== Congress ===
He was elected simultaneously as a Democrat to the 90th and to the 91st Congress, by special election, to fill the vacancy caused by the death of United States Representative Elmer Holland.

He prioritized workers’ rights and preservation of the domestic steel industry while in Congress. He was a strong supporter of organized labor and was a leading proponent of strengthening labor laws to provide health and pension benefits, as well as job safety protections, for employees.

He was not a candidate for renomination in 1992.

=== Death ===
He died on February 7, 2015, aged 88.

== Sources ==
- United States Congress. "Joseph M. Gaydos (id: G000105)". Biographical Directory of the United States Congress.; retrieved March 1, 2015
- Appearances on C-SPAN

U.S. House of Representatives
Preceded by Elmer Holland	Member of the U.S. House of Representatives from Pennsylvania's 20th congressional district 1968–1993	Succeeded by Austin Murphy
