= Wilson Christian Academy =

Location
- West Mifflin, Allegheny, Pennsylvania; 40.3344°N 79.9343°W

Information
- Other name: Cornerstone Christian Preparatory Academy (2016- )
- Founded: 1977
- Closed: 2016
- Accreditation: Middle States
- Website: www.wilson.cc

Wilson Christian Academy was a private Christian school in West Mifflin, Pennsylvania, that was established in 1977. It offered preschool for four- and five-year-olds, a full day kindergarten program and classes for grades 1 through 12.

In July 2016, it was announced that Wilson would be merged into Cornerstone Christian Preparatory Academy, a school which had been founded in 2008 by Brandon McCall and was then located in South Park. The school remained at Wilson Christian Academy's location in West Mifflin but took Cornerstone's name and adopted their policies and education model. The school remains Pre-K through 12th grade.
