= Ron Crosby =

American football player (born 1955)

No. 51, 55, 54, 57
- Position: Linebacker

Personal information
- Born: March 2, 1955 (age 71); McKeesport, Pennsylvania, U.S.
- Listed height: 6 ft 3 in (1.91 m)
- Listed weight: 224 lb (102 kg)

Career information
- High school: South Allegheny (McKeesport)
- College: Penn State (1973–1976)
- NFL draft: 1977: 5th round, 114th overall pick

Career history
- Detroit Lions (1977)*; New Orleans Saints (1978–1979); New York Jets (1979–1983); Pittsburgh Maulers (1984); Baltimore Stars (1985)
- * Offseason or practice squad member only

Awards and highlights
- Second-team All-East (1976)

Career NFL statistics
- Sacks: 1
- Interceptions: 2
- Fumble recoveries: 4
- Stats at Pro Football Reference

Ronald Crosby (born March 2, 1955) is an American former professional football player who was a linebacker for six seasons in the National Football League (NFL) with the New Orleans Saints and New York Jets. He was selected by the Detroit Lions in the fifth round of the 1977 NFL draft after playing college football for the Penn State Nittany Lions. Crosby was also a member of the Pittsburgh Maulers and Baltimore Stars of the United States Football League (USFL).

== Early life and college ==
Ronald Crosby was born on March 2, 1955, in McKeesport, Pennsylvania. He attended South Allegheny Middle/Senior High School in McKeesport.

Crosby was a member of the Penn State Nittany Lions of Pennsylvania State University from 1973 to 1976 and a three-year letterman from 1974 to 1976. He earned Associated Press second-team All-East honors in 1976.

== Professional career ==
Crosby was selected by the Detroit Lions in the fifth round, with the 114th overall pick, of the 1977 NFL draft. He was placed on injured reserve on September 12, 1977, and missed the entire 1977 season. He was released by the Lions on August 23, 1978.

Crosby signed with the New Orleans Saints on September 14, 1978. He played in 14 games for the Saints during the 1978 season. He was placed on injured reserve on August 21, 1979, and was released on September 11, 1979.

Crosby was signed by the New York Jets on September 26, 1979. He appeared in 12 games for that Jets in 1979 and recovered one fumble. He started all 16 games in 1980, recording two interceptions for 47 yards and one fumble recovery. The Jets finished the year with a 4–12 record. Crosby played in all 16 games for the second consecutive season, starting three, in 1981 and posted one sack. He also appeared in one playoff game during the 1981 season. He played in nine regular season games and three postseason games for the Jets in 1982. Crosby appeared in all 16 games, starting one, during his final year with the Jets in 1983, recovering one fumble while also rushing once for five yards. He became a free agent after the 1983 season.

Crosby signed with the Pittsburgh Maulers of the United States Football League (USFL) on January 8, 1984. He started 15 games for the Maulers during the 1984 season, totaling two sacks and one interception.

In December 1984, he was selected by the Baltimore Stars of the USFL in an allocation draft. He was a member of the Stars during the 1985 season.

== Personal life ==
After his football career, Crosby worked in sales for 36 years before retiring.
