= Lincoln, Pennsylvania =

Borough in Pennsylvania, US

Lincoln, Pennsylvania Nei Effredaa (Pennsylvania German)
- Borough
- Borough of Lincoln
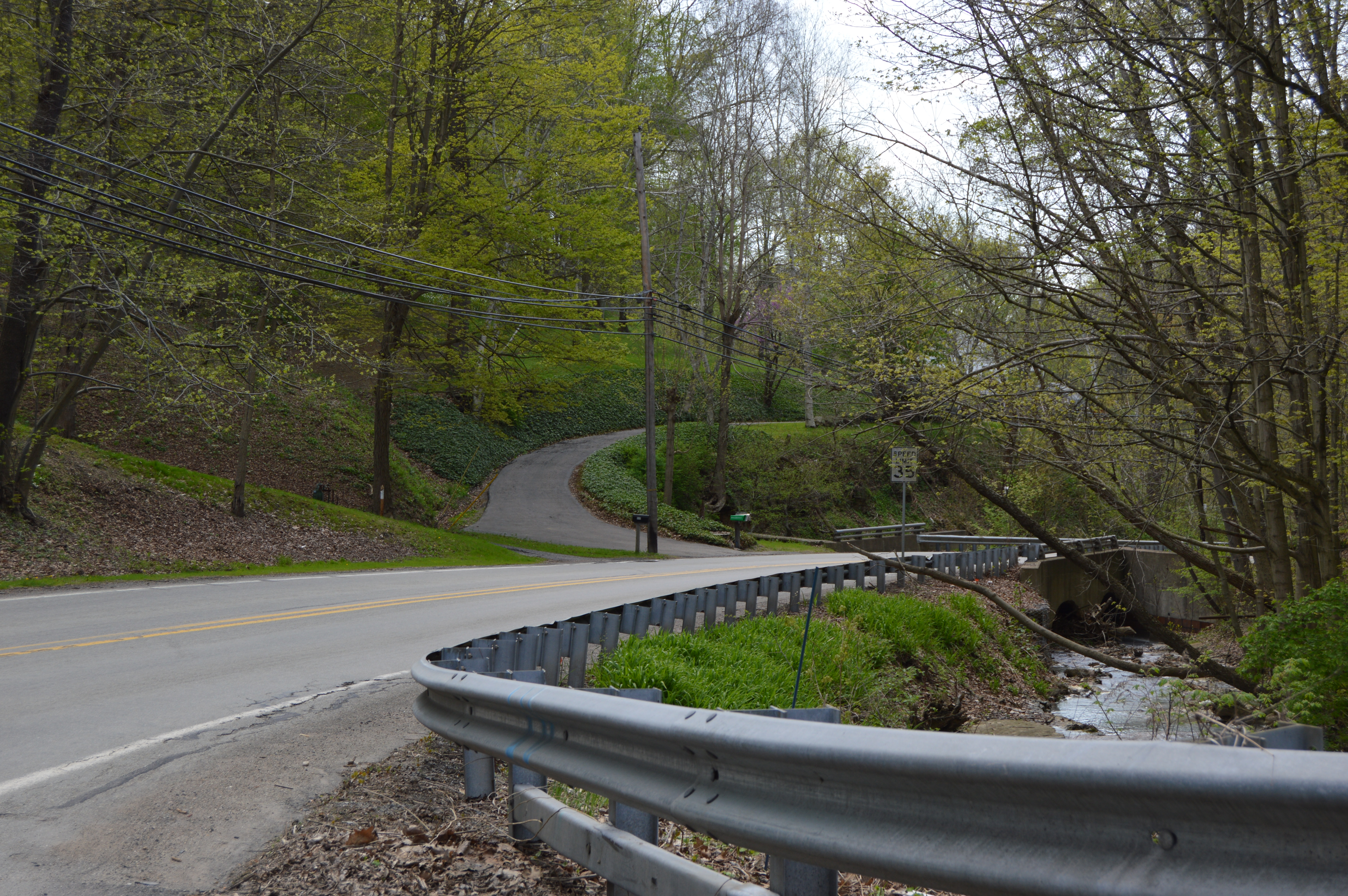
- Wylie Run and Lovedale Road

- Location in Allegheny County and the state of Pennsylvania.
- Coordinates: 40°17′27″N 79°51′5″W
- Country: United States
- State: Pennsylvania
- County: Allegheny
- Borough: February 6, 1958

Government
  - Type: Mayor-Council
  - Mayor: James Beisler

Area
  - Total: 5.02 sq mi (12.99 km^{2})
  - Land: 4.80 sq mi (12.43 km^{2})
  - Water: 0.21 sq mi (0.55 km^{2})
- Elevation: 1,122 ft (342 m)

Population (2020)
  - Total: 932
  - Density: 194.2/sq mi (74.97/km^{2})
- Time zone: UTC-5 (Eastern (EST))
  - Summer (DST): UTC-4 (EDT)
- ZIP codes: 15133, 15135, 15037
- FIPS code: 42-43408
- Website: www.lincolnborough.com

Lincoln (Pennsylvania German: Nei Effredaa, lit. 'New Ephrata') [The reference to "New Ephrata" relates not to the Lincoln of Allegheny County, but rather to the Lincoln of Lancaster County, now assimilated into the Borough of Ephrata.] is a borough in Allegheny County, Pennsylvania, United States. The population was 932 at the 2020 United States census.

Lincoln does not have its own post office. Three ZIP codes are used in the borough: 15133 for the northern portion of the borough adjacent to Liberty; 15135 for the eastern portion adjacent to the city of McKeesport; 15037 for the remainder of the borough, with mail addressed to Elizabeth.

== History ==
The borough was named for Abraham Lincoln. Lincoln was incorporated on February 6, 1958, before which it was Lincoln Township. The change in governmental structure came after a portion of the borough attempted to secede from Lincoln Township to annex with Liberty Borough. Dead Man's Hollow is a 450-acre conservation area whose boundary lies within the borough.

== Geography and surrounding neighborhoods ==
Lincoln is located at 40°17′27″N 79°51′5″W (40.291939, −79.851303). It is bounded by Glassport to the northwest, Liberty to the north, Versailles to the northeast, Elizabeth Township and the Youghiogheny River to the east and south, and Jefferson Hills, Clairton, and the Monongahela River to the west. The borough has a total area of 5.0 square miles (13 km^{2}), of which 4.8 square miles (12 km^{2}) is land and 0.2 square miles (0.52 km^{2}), or 4.57%, is water.

== Government and politics ==
As of 2019, the mayor was James Beisler.

Presidential election results
Year	Republican	Democratic	Third parties
2024	72% 408	28% 156	0% 2
2020	69% 416	29% 175	1% 8
2016	71% 375	26% 137	2% 13
2012	58% 272	41% 194	1% 5
2008	52% 269	46% 234	2% 11

== Education ==
Lincoln is part of the South Allegheny School District, along with Liberty, Glassport and Port Vue.

== Demographics ==
Historical population
Census	Pop.	Note	%±
1940	1,015		—
1950	1,467		44.5%
1960	1,686		14.9%
1970	1,885		11.8%
1980	1,428		−24.2%
1990	1,187		−16.9%
2000	1,218		2.6%
2010	1,072		−12.0%
2020	932		−13.1%

=== 2000 census ===
As of the 2000 census, there were 1,218 people, 482 households, and 359 families in the borough. The population density was 254/sqmi (98.0/km^{2}). There were 506 housing units at an average density of 105.5/sqmi (40.7/km^{2}). The racial makeup of the borough was 98.77% White, 0.66% African American, 0.08% Native American, 0.33% Asian, and 0.16% from two or more races. Hispanic or Latino of any race were 0.74% of the population.

There were 484 households, out of which 24.8% had children under the age of 18 living with them, 62.4% were married couples living together, 8.9% had a female householder with no husband present, and 25.8% were non-families. 22.1% of all households were made up of individuals, and 9.3% had someone living alone who was 65 years of age or older. The average household size was 2.52 and the average family size was 2.94.

The borough population contained 19.0% under the age of 18, 5.9% from 18 to 24, 27.2% from 25 to 44, 28.1% from 45 to 64, and 19.9% who were 65 years of age or older. The median age was 43 years. For every 100 females, there were 92.1 males. For every 100 females age 18 and over, there were 91.3 males.

The median income for a household in the borough was $37,917, and the median income for a family was $43,333. Males had a median income of $35,852 versus $21,131 for females. The per capita income for the borough was $18,447. About 6.9% of families and 9.1% of the population were below the poverty line, including 8.4% of those under age 18 and 14.2% of those age 65 or over.
