= West Mifflin Area High School =

Location
- 91 Commonwealth Avenue; West Mifflin, Pennsylvania 15122; United States; 40°22′53″N 79°52′24″W

Information
- Type: Public High School
- Established: 1956
- School district: West Mifflin Area School District
- Principal: Chad Licht
- Grades: 9–12
- Enrollment: 1,031 (2016–17)
- Colors: Blue and Gold, White Accent
- Athletics conference: WPIAL Class AAA
- Mascot: Titan
- Rival: Thomas Jefferson
- Accreditation: MSCSS
- Yearbook: The Titan
- Website: West Mifflin Area High School

West Mifflin Area High School is a 9–12 high school in West Mifflin, Pennsylvania, United States.

== History ==
West Mifflin North High School first opened on Commonwealth Avenue in West Mifflin in 1960. At that time, it was the only public High School in West Mifflin and did not have a senior class. West Mifflin South High School opened on Camp Hollow Road in the following year, 1961, and became the second public High School in West Mifflin. In 1962 there were two graduating classes in West Mifflin, the class of 1962 from West Mifflin North High School and the class of 1962 from West Mifflin South High School. In the mid-1960s the district added two elementary schools, Borland and New England. Both schools were decommissioned by 1990. The original South High became Lebanon Junior High School and was physically connected to the South High School building. Both schools have since been demolished and a public park may be built on the site.

Later, West Mifflin South High School closed, leaving one high school open on Commonwealth Avenue named "West Mifflin Area High School". It is West Mifflin Area School District's largest and second most modern facility. A total renovation to the high school campus was completed in 2001, more than doubling the school's size to over 255,000 square feet (23,700 m^{2}) and increasing its form and functionality. Some of the amenities include a swimming pool, a fitness center, countless computer labs, recording studios, one of the largest auditoriums in the area, multiple gymnasiums, an automated Large Group Instruction Room, a greenhouse, as well as an extensive Library Information Center. Currently, through funding from the Classrooms for the Future program, technology has become an abundant resource at the school.

== Freshman Academy ==
The high school was formerly home to a school-within-a-school concept known as the Freshman Academy until the 2011-12 school year. The ninth grade students were taught in an exclusive wing of the complex, where they were guided on career and curriculum choices, school expectations, and given positive reinforcement for academic success. The Academy also had its own principal, strengthening further the community atmosphere of this unique setting.

== Notable alumni ==
- Jeff Goldblum (1970), actor
- Tanisha Wright (2001), WNBA player and coach
- Nick Pisciottano (2008), Pennsylvania Senate member
- Darius Prince (2008), professional football player
