= Port Vue, Pennsylvania =

Borough in Pennsylvania, US

- Borough
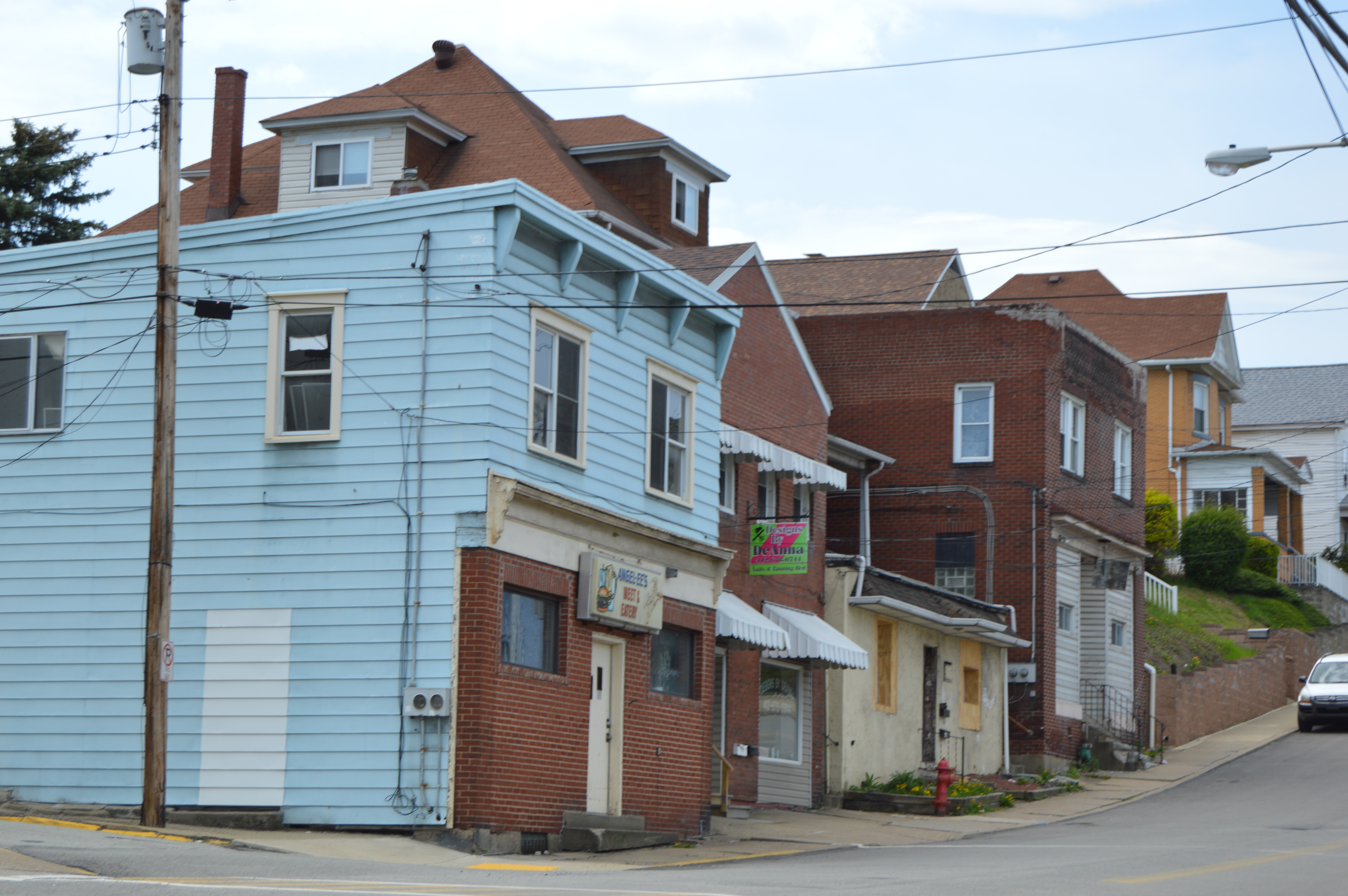
- Romine Avenue

- Location in Allegheny County and the U.S. state of Pennsylvania.
- Coordinates: 40°20′19″N 79°52′14″W
- Country: United States
- State: Pennsylvania
- County: Allegheny

Area
  - Total: 1.17 sq mi (3.02 km^{2})
  - Land: 1.14 sq mi (2.94 km^{2})
  - Water: 0.031 sq mi (0.08 km^{2})

Population (2020)
  - Total: 3,680
  - Density: 3,246/sq mi (1,253.1/km^{2})
- Time zone: UTC-5 (Eastern (EST))
  - Summer (DST): UTC-4 (EDT)
- FIPS code: 42-62320
- Website: portvue.org

Port Vue is a borough in Allegheny County, Pennsylvania, United States. The population was 3,680 at the 2020 census.

== Geography ==
Port Vue is located in western Pennsylvania along the Youghiogheny River near its confluence with the more navigable Monongahela River. It is bounded by McKeesport to the north, Liberty to the east and south and Glassport to the west.

According to the United States Census Bureau, the borough has a total area of 1.1 square miles (2.8 km^{2}), of which 0.04 square miles (0.10 km^{2}), or 3.54%, is water.

== Education ==
Port Vue is served by the South Allegheny School District.

== Police ==
The Port Vue Police Department is based at 1194 Romine Avenue. There are currently 4 full-time and 3 part-time officers serving the borough.

== History ==
In 1891, approximately 500 residents of Lincoln Township decided to create a new borough. They met in a school house on the old Edmundson farm, and initially thought of naming the new borough "Grandview". However, because of the beautiful view of the port that McKeesport maintained on the Youghiogheny River, they agreed on Port Vue instead. Since then, war veterans and coal miners commonly lived in Port Vue. Port Vue borough was incorporated on September 20, 1892.

== Government and politics ==
Presidential election results
Year	Republican	Democratic	Third parties
2020	59% 1,091	40% 737	1% 18
2016	59% 1,005	38% 640	3% 41
2012	51% 788	48% 739	1% 25
2008	48% 865	50% 899	1% 26

2024 US Presidential Election Results in Port Vue
Party	Candidate	Running-Mate	Votes	%
Republican	Donald Trump	JD Vance	1080	58.19
Democratic	Kamala Harris	Tim Walz	757	40.79
Green	Jill Stein	Rudolph Ware	7	0.38
Libertarian	Chase Oliver	Mike ter Maat	5	0.27
Write-In Candidates			7	0.38

2020 US Presidential Election Results in Port Vue
Party	Candidate	Running-Mate	Votes	%
Republican	Donald Trump	Mike Pence	1091	58.81
Democratic	Joe Biden	Kamala Harris	737	39.73
Libertarian	Jo Jorgensen	Spike Cohen	18	0.97
Write-In Candidates			9	0.49

2016 US Presidential Election Results in Port Vue
Party	Candidate	Running-Mate	Votes	%
Republican	Donald Trump	Mike Pence	1005	59.26
Democratic	Hillary Clinton	Tim Kaine	640	37.74
Libertarian	Gary Johnson	Bill Weld	33	1.95
Green	Jill Stein	Ajamu Baraka	6	0.35
Constitution	Darrell Castle	Scott Bradley	2	0.12
Write In Candidates			10	0.59

2012 US Presidential Election Results in Port Vue
Party	Candidate	Running-Mate	Votes	%
Republican	Mitt Romney	Paul Ryan	793	50.32
Democratic	Barack Obama	Joe Biden	752	47.72
Libertarian	Gary Johnson	Jim Gray	15	0.95
Green	Jill Stein	Cheri Honkala	10	0.63
Write In Candidates			6	0.38

2008 US Presidential Election Results in Port Vue
Party	Candidate	Running-Mate	Votes	%
Democratic	Barack Obama	Joe Biden	899	50.22
Republican	John McCain	Sarah Palin	865	48.32
Independent	Ralph Nader	Matt Gonzalez	15	0.84
Libertarian	Bob Barr	Wayne Root	3	0.17
Write In Candidates			8	0.45

2022 US Senate Election Results in Port Vue
Party	Candidate	Votes	%
Democratic	John Fetterman	686	49.85
Republican	Mehmet Oz	653	47.46
Libertarian	Erik Gerhardt	18	1.31
Green	Richard Weiss	8	0.58
Keystone	Daniel Wassmer	8	0.58
Write In Candidates		3	0.22

2022 US Congress PA District 12 Election Results in Port Vue
Party	Candidate	Votes	%
Republican	Mike Doyle	824	61.82
Democratic	Summer Lee	500	37.51
Write In Candidates		9	0.68

== Demographics ==
Historical population
Census	Pop.	Note	%±
1900	1,803		—
1910	1,978		9.7%
1920	2,538		28.3%
1930	3,510		38.3%
1940	3,601		2.6%
1950	4,756		32.1%
1960	6,635		39.5%
1970	5,862		−11.7%
1980	5,316		−9.3%
1990	4,641		−12.7%
2000	4,228		−8.9%
2010	3,798		−10.2%
2020	3,680		−3.1%

=== 2020 census ===
As of the 2020 census, Port Vue had a population of 3,680. The median age was 44.5 years. 19.2% of residents were under the age of 18 and 21.6% of residents were 65 years of age or older. For every 100 females there were 93.0 males, and for every 100 females age 18 and over there were 91.1 males age 18 and over.

100.0% of residents lived in urban areas, while 0.0% lived in rural areas.

There were 1,643 households in Port Vue, of which 23.8% had children under the age of 18 living in them. Of all households, 38.0% were married-couple households, 20.5% were households with a male householder and no spouse or partner present, and 32.3% were households with a female householder and no spouse or partner present. About 32.8% of all households were made up of individuals and 16.0% had someone living alone who was 65 years of age or older.

There were 1,825 housing units, of which 10.0% were vacant. The homeowner vacancy rate was 2.5% and the rental vacancy rate was 8.9%.

Racial composition as of the 2020 census
Race	Number	Percent
White	3,208	87.2%
Black or African American	161	4.4%
American Indian and Alaska Native	12	0.3%
Asian	16	0.4%
Native Hawaiian and Other Pacific Islander	0	0.0%
Some other race	40	1.1%
Two or more races	243	6.6%
Hispanic or Latino (of any race)	84	2.3%

=== 2010 census ===
As of the 2010 census, there were 3,798 people, 1,694 households, and 1,045 families residing in the borough. The population density was 3,645.4 inhabitants per square mile (1,407.5/km^{2}). There were 1,832 housing units at an average density of 1,764.6 per square mile (681.3/km^{2}). The racial makeup of the borough was 97.8% White, 2.00% African American, 0.06% Native American, 0.03% Asian, 0.01% Pacific Islander, 0.02% from other races, and 0.01% from two or more races. Hispanic or Latino of any race were 0.76% of the population.

There were 1,694 households, out of which 22.7% had children under the age of 18 living with them, 41.6% were married couples living together, 15.5% had a female householder with no husband present, and 38.3% were non-families. 32.8% of all households were made up of individuals, and 17.9% had someone living alone who was 65 years of age or older. The average household size was 2.30 and the average family size was 2.87.

In the borough the population was spread out, with 20.9% under the age of 18, 7.0% from 18 to 24, 25.7% from 25 to 44, 22.4% from 45 to 64, and 34.2% who were 65 years of age or older. The median age was 45.6 years. For every 100 females there were 89.2 males. For every 100 females age 18 and over, there were 90.0 males.

=== 2000 census ===
As of the 2000 census, the median income for a household in the borough was $31,509, and the median income for a family was $37,318. Males had a median income of $31,680 versus $23,203 for females. The per capita income for the borough was $16,065. About 7.7% of families and 10.5% of the population were below the poverty line, including 22.2% of those under age 18 and 5.1% of those age 65 or over.
