= Liberty, Allegheny County, Pennsylvania =

Borough in Pennsylvania, US

Liberty, Pennsylvania
- Borough
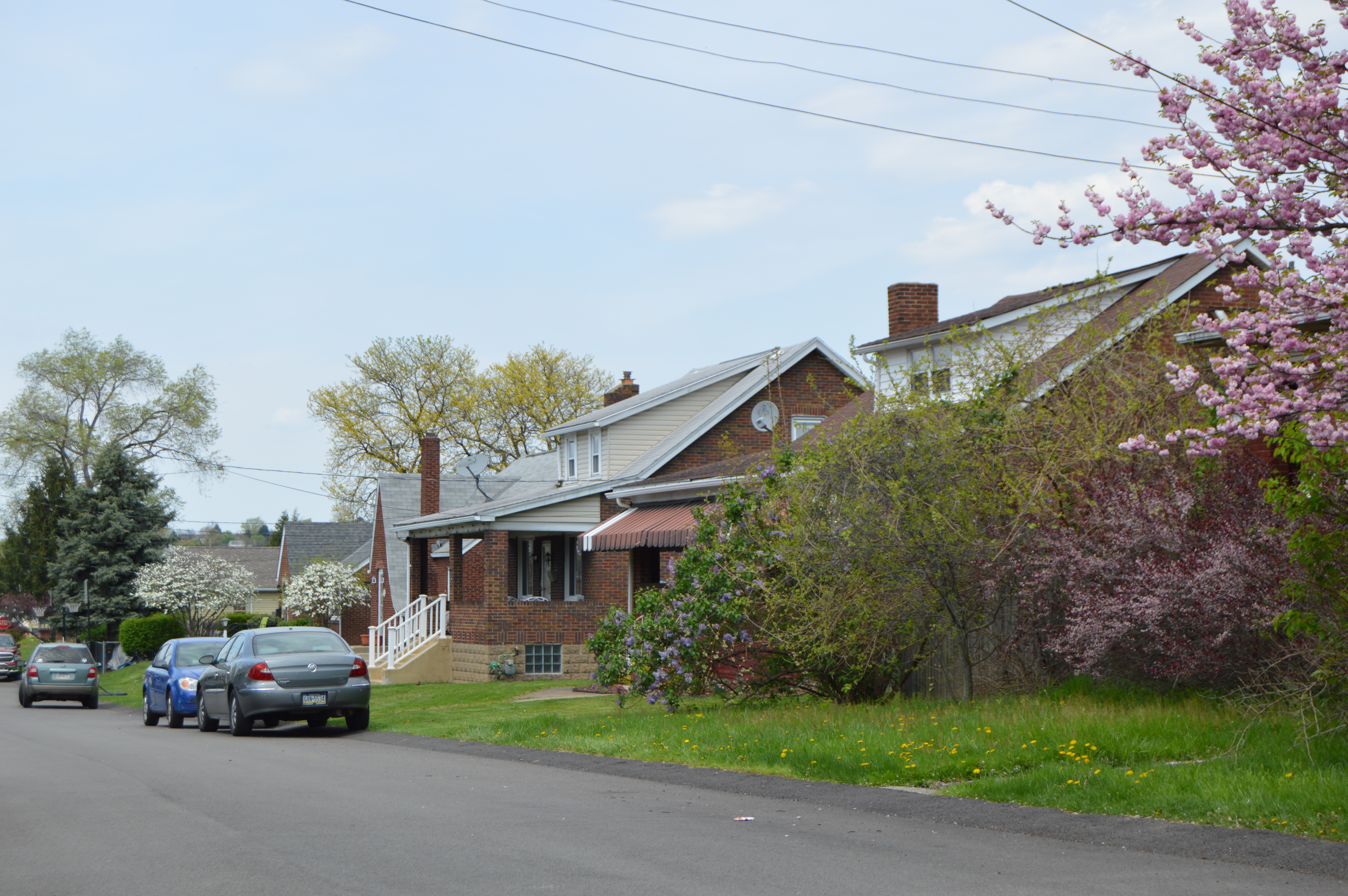
- Bungalows on "E" Street

- Location in Allegheny County and the state of Pennsylvania.
- Coordinates: 40°19′35″N 79°51′22″W
- Country: United States
- State: Pennsylvania
- County: Allegheny

Area
  - Total: 1.47 sq mi (3.81 km^{2})
  - Land: 1.43 sq mi (3.70 km^{2})
  - Water: 0.039 sq mi (0.10 km^{2})

Population (2020)
  - Total: 2,355
  - Density: 1,646.4/sq mi (635.66/km^{2})
- Time zone: UTC-5 (Eastern (EST))
  - Summer (DST): UTC-4 (EDT)
- FIPS code: 42-43064
- GNIS feature ID: 1214805
- Website: www.libertyborough.com

Liberty is a borough in Allegheny County, Pennsylvania, United States. The population was 2,355 at the 2020 census.

Liberty does not have its own post office. The zip code is 15133, and mail is addressed to the city of McKeesport. Liberty is part of the South Allegheny School District, along with Glassport, Lincoln, and Port Vue, and is home to the district's high school and early childhood center. Liberty was at one time part of Port Vue but gained its "liberty" from Port Vue in 1912, thus the origin of the name of the town.

Locals tend to refer to the town as "Liberty Borough" or "Liberty Boro," rather than just as "Liberty."

== Geography ==
Liberty is located at 40°19′35″N 79°51′22″W (40.326302, −79.856101). It is bounded by Port Vue and McKeesport to the north, Versailles and the Youghiogheny River to the east, Lincoln to the south, and Glassport to the west.

According to the United States Census Bureau, the borough has a total area of 1.5 square miles (3.9 km^{2}), of which 1.4 square miles (3.6 km^{2}) is land and 0.1 square miles (0.26 km^{2}), or 4.00%, is water.

== Government and politics ==
Presidential election results
Year	Republican	Democratic	Third parties
2024	62% 857	37% 510	1% 10
2020	61% 849	37% 514	1% 23
2016	62% 776	36% 450	2% 29
2012	52% 603	47% 547	1% 13
2008	53% 678	46% 590	1% 19

== Education ==
Liberty Borough is served by the South Allegheny School District.

== Demographics ==
Historical population
Census	Pop.	Note	%±
1920	601		—
1930	906		50.7%
1940	1,084		19.6%
1950	1,900		75.3%
1960	3,624		90.7%
1970	3,594		−0.8%
1980	3,112		−13.4%
1990	2,744		−11.8%
2000	2,670		−2.7%
2010	2,551		−4.5%
2020	2,355		−7.7%

As of the 2000 census, there were 2,670 people, 1,125 households, and 768 families residing in the borough. The population density was 1,856.7 inhabitants per square mile (716.9/km^{2}). There were 1,162 housing units at an average density of 808.1 per square mile (312.0/km^{2}). The racial makeup of the borough was 97.98% White, 1.46% African American, 0.11% Native American, 0.11% Asian, 0.04% Pacific Islander, and 0.30% from two or more races. Hispanic or Latino of any race were 0.37% of the population.

There were 1,125 households, out of which 27.0% had children under the age of 18 living with them, 53.2% were married couples living together, 12.1% had a female householder with no husband present, and 31.7% were non-families. 28.5% of all households were made up of individuals, and 16.1% had someone living alone who was 65 years of age or older. The average household size was 2.35 and the average family size was 2.89.

In the borough the population was spread out, with 20.1% under the age of 18, 6.7% from 18 to 24, 26.6% from 25 to 44, 25.3% from 45 to 64, and 21.2% who were 65 years of age or older. The median age was 43 years. For every 100 females there were 88.7 males. For every 100 females age 18 and over, there were 84.3 males.

The median income for a household in the borough was $35,264, and the median income for a family was $42,857. Males had a median income of $35,685 versus $22,304 for females. The per capita income for the borough was $19,491. About 5.6% of families and 7.6% of the population were below the poverty line, including 11.8% of those under age 18 and 5.3% of those age 65 or over.
