= West Mifflin Area School District =

School district in Pennsylvania, USA

Address
- 1020 Lebanon Road, Suite 250 West Mifflin, Allegheny County, Pennsylvania, 15122; United States

District information
- Type: Public
- Grades: Pre-K-12
- Schools: West Mifflin Area High School, West Mifflin Area Middle School, Homeville Elementary, Clara Barton Elementary

Students and staff
- Colors: Blue, gold

Other information
- Website: http://www.wmasd.org

West Mifflin Area School District is a suburban, public school district in the Commonwealth of Pennsylvania. It is located in the south hills of Allegheny County. It serves the boroughs of West Mifflin, and Whitaker. As of 2007, the district also serves some students from the neighboring City of Duquesne. West Mifflin Area School District encompasses approximately 15 square miles. According to 2000 federal census data, it serves a resident population of 22,802. In 2009, the district residents' per capita income was $18,240, while the median family income was $45,660.

== Schools ==
- West Mifflin Area High School: Grades served: 9–12
- West Mifflin Area Middle School: Grades served: 4–8
- Elementary schools
  - Clara Barton Elementary School: Grades served: K-3
  - Homeville Elementary: Grades served : Pre-K-3
