= Glassport, Pennsylvania =

Borough in Allegheny County, Pennsylvania

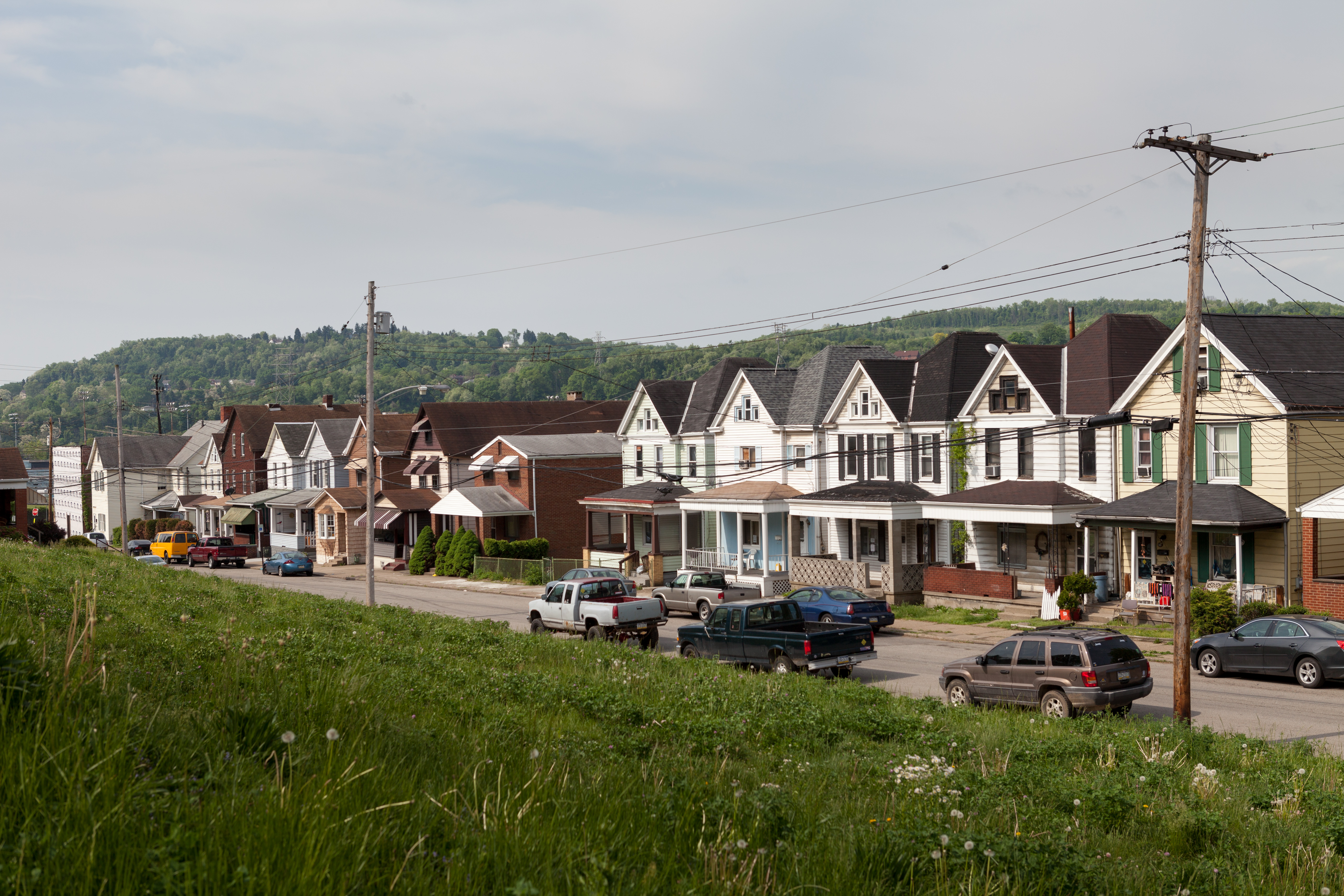
A row of houses on the west side of the 800 block of Ohio Avenue

Location in Allegheny County and the state of Pennsylvania

Glassport is a borough in Allegheny County, Pennsylvania, United States, approximately 10 miles (16 km) south of Pittsburgh and the confluence of the Monongahela and Allegheny rivers where they form the Ohio River. Glassport lies along the east side of the Monongahela River in the "Mon Valley", where many blue-collar municipalities have suffered severe economic decline in the wake of the loss of steel-making throughout the Greater Pittsburgh area. In 1910, the population of Glassport was 5,540. By 1940, it had risen to 8,748, but has since declined to 4,475 as of the 2020 census.

== Government ==
The Mayor of Glassport is Anthony Colecchi, and the council members are: Meghan DeVerse (Council President), Mark Stecak (VP), Dave Kowalski, Jennifer Stockett, Rich Giannandrea, Toni Cregan, and Paul Trunzo.

== History ==
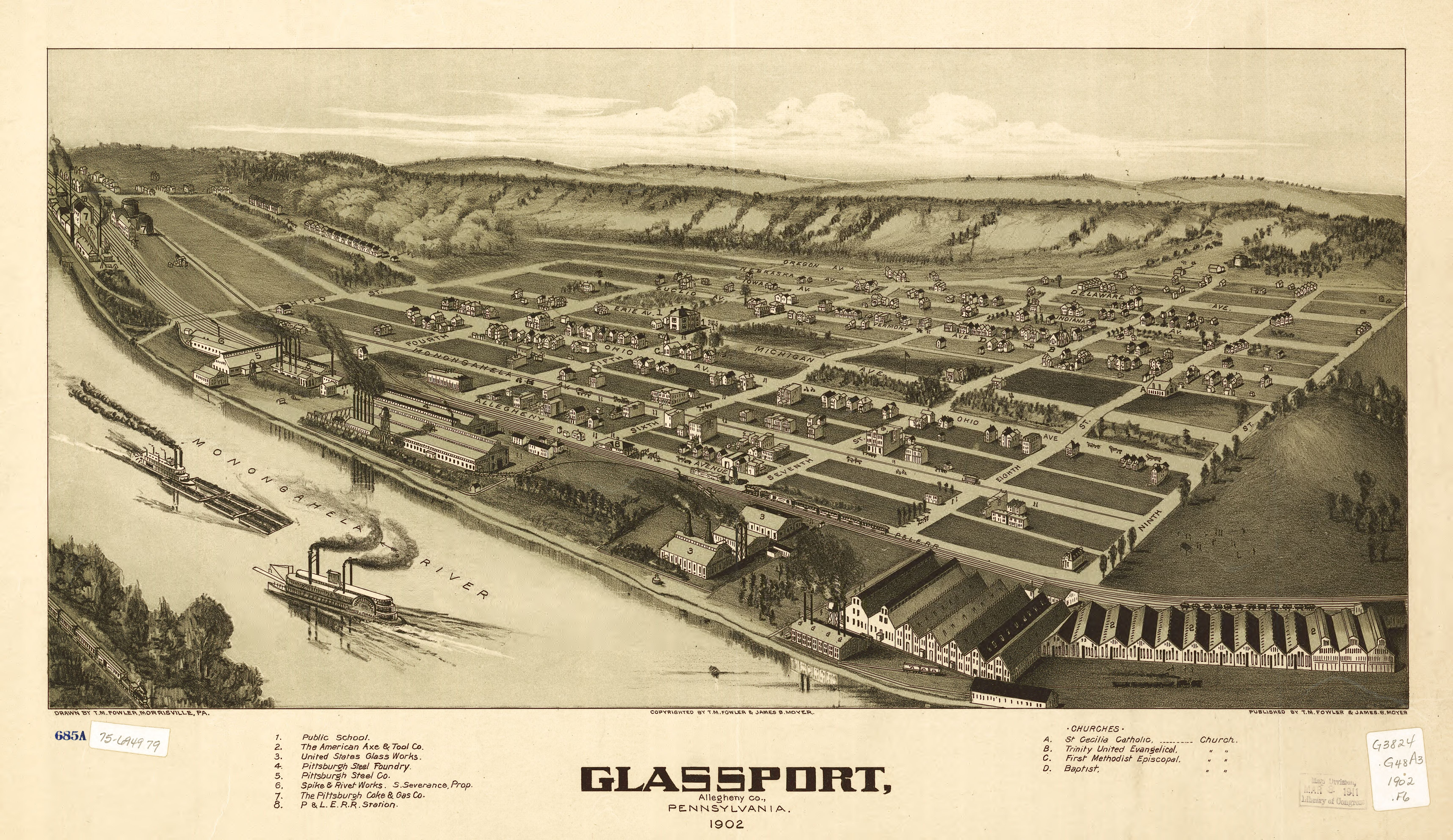
Glassport in 1902

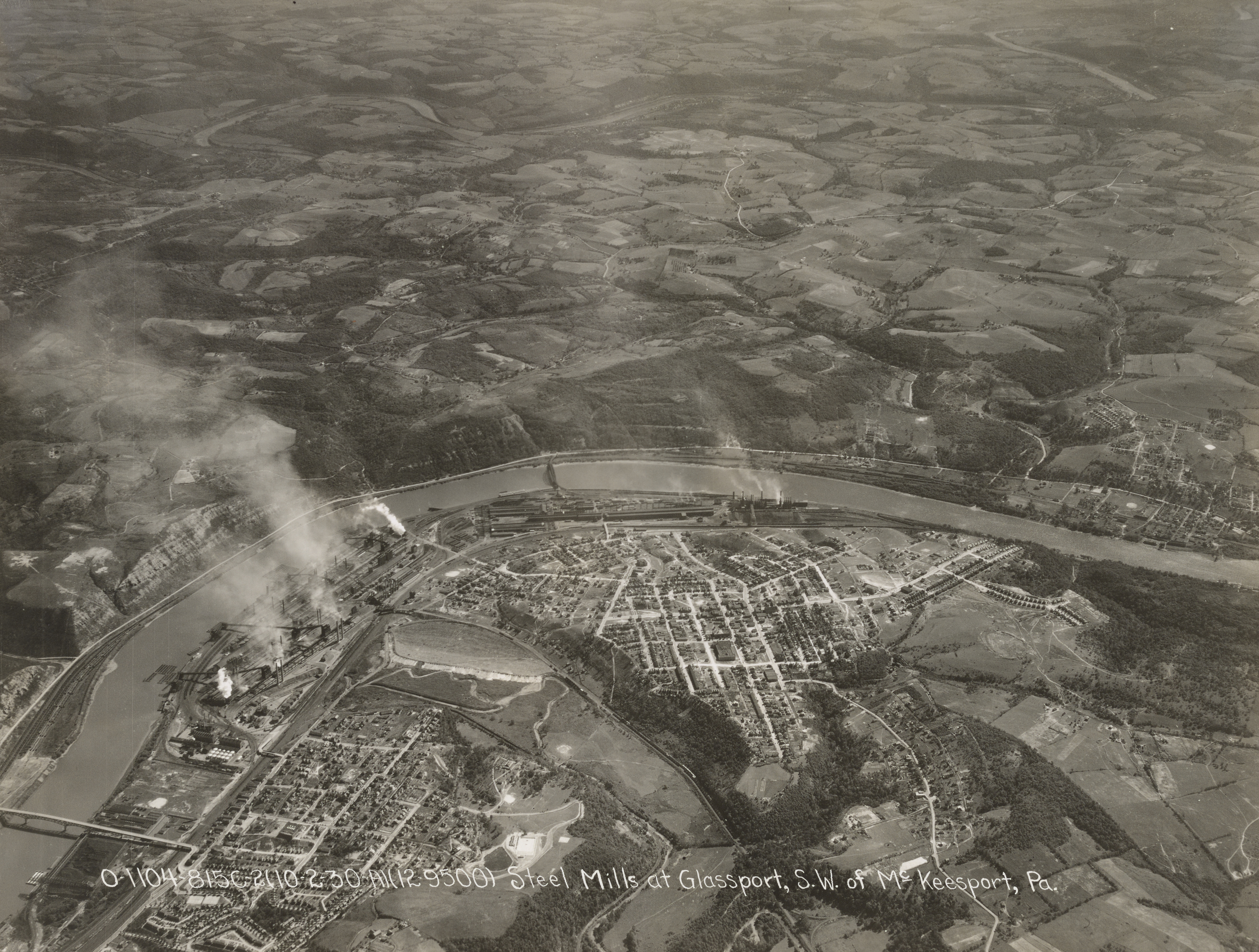
Glassport in 1930

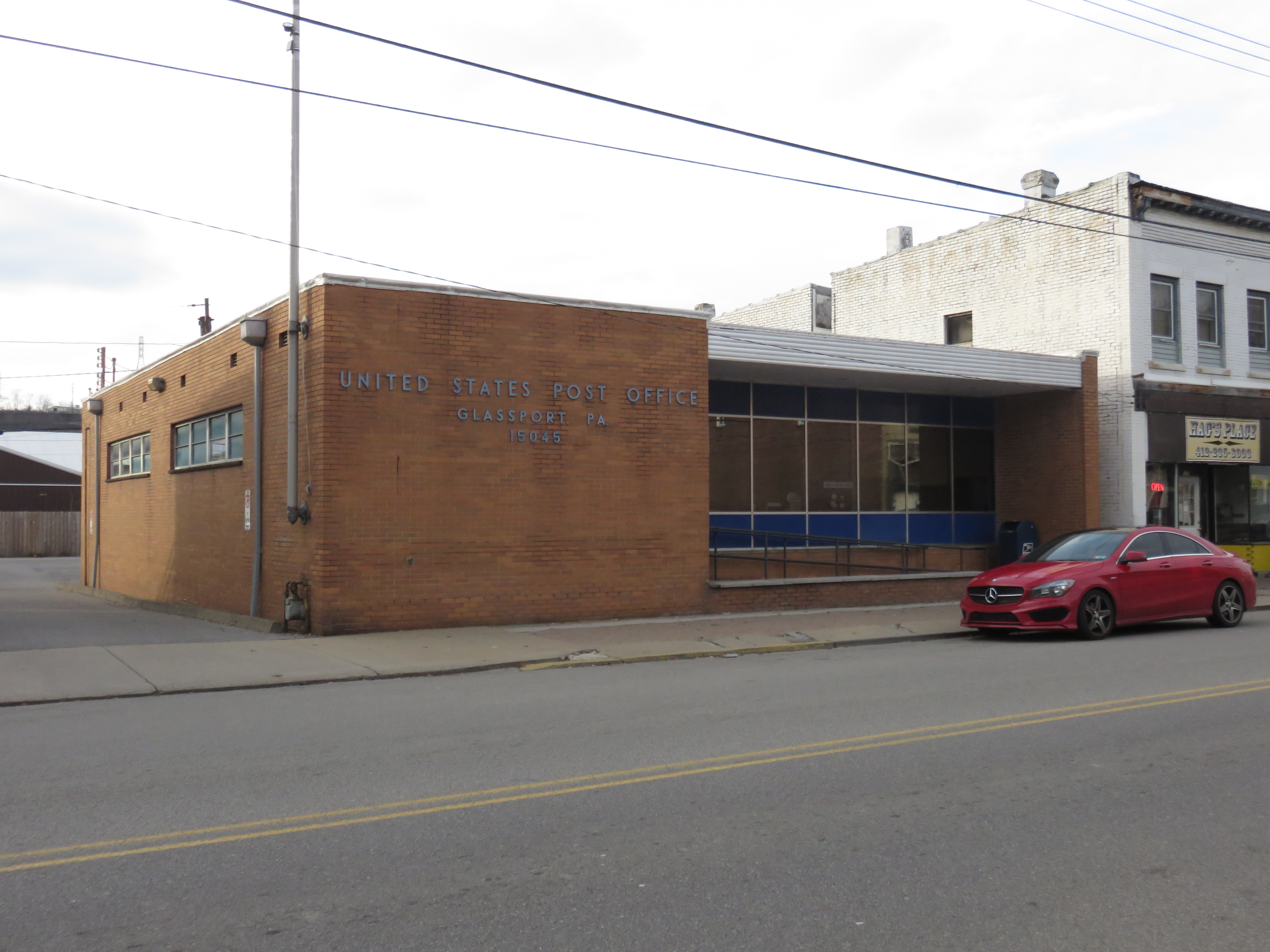
Glassport post office in 2018

Before Glassport was its own borough, the territory was part of Elizabeth Township, then of Lincoln Township, then Port Vue. In 1902, it became a separate municipality, comprising 1.52 square miles. The town was built around a mill called The United States Glass Company which was built in 1894. The factory came to be known as “the Glass House”. The area was originally laid out in a plot plan by the Glassport Land Company, a subsidiary of the United States Glass Co, and Glassport was named after this company. The United States Glass Company was located near the Monongahela River on Seventh Street. The company specialized in "pressed glass," tableware, and other glass products made from molds.

In 1963, the United States Glass Company was damaged by a tornado, and their 80-foot water tower collapsed through the building's roof. The furnaces shut down and the liquid glass cooled and hardened. Afterwards there was left a 250-ton block of solid glass, making any plans to rebuild too costly.

== Demographics ==
Historical population
Census	Pop.	Note	%±
1910	5,540		—
1920	6,959		25.6%
1930	8,390		20.6%
1940	8,748		4.3%
1950	8,707		−0.5%
1960	8,418		−3.3%
1970	7,450		−11.5%
1980	6,242		−16.2%
1990	5,582		−10.6%
2000	4,993		−10.6%
2010	4,483		−10.2%
2020	4,475		−0.2%

=== 2020 census ===
As of the 2020 census, Glassport had a population of 4,475. The median age was 40.3 years. 22.3% of residents were under the age of 18 and 18.7% of residents were 65 years of age or older. For every 100 females there were 92.6 males, and for every 100 females age 18 and over there were 90.9 males age 18 and over.

100.0% of residents lived in urban areas, while 0.0% lived in rural areas.

There were 1,975 households in Glassport, of which 26.6% had children under the age of 18 living in them. Of all households, 30.7% were married-couple households, 24.7% were households with a male householder and no spouse or partner present, and 34.9% were households with a female householder and no spouse or partner present. About 37.4% of all households were made up of individuals and 16.7% had someone living alone who was 65 years of age or older.

There were 2,288 housing units, of which 13.7% were vacant. The homeowner vacancy rate was 2.2% and the rental vacancy rate was 8.2%.

Racial composition as of the 2020 census
Race	Number	Percent
White	3,681	82.3%
Black or African American	408	9.1%
American Indian and Alaska Native	12	0.3%
Asian	16	0.4%
Native Hawaiian and Other Pacific Islander	2	0.0%
Some other race	67	1.5%
Two or more races	289	6.5%
Hispanic or Latino (of any race)	128	2.9%

=== 2000 census ===
As of the 2000 census there were 4,993 people, 2,187 households, and 1,355 families residing in the borough. The population density was 2,968.5 people per square mile (1,146.1 people/km^{2}). There were 2,405 housing units at an average density of 1,429.8 per square mile (552.0/km^{2}). The racial makeup of the borough was 98.24% White, 0.56% African American, 0.28% Native American, 0.18% Asian, 0.06% Pacific Islander, 0.18% from other races, and 0.50% from two or more races. Hispanic or Latino people of any race were 0.82% of the population. 22.4% were of Polish, 22.0% Italian, 13.0% German, 8.7% Irish, 7.9% Slovak and 5.6% English ancestry.

There were 2,187 households, out of which 23.7% had children under the age of 18 living with them, 42.2% were married couples living together, 15.2% had a female householder with no husband present, and 38.0% were non-families. 33.6% of all households were made up of individuals, and 17.6% had someone living alone who was 65 years of age or older. The average household size was 2.27 and the average family size was 2.87.

In the borough the population was spread out, with 20.9% under the age of 18, 7.2% from 18 to 24, 26.6% from 25 to 44, 23.1% from 45 to 64, and 22.2% who were 65 or older. The median age was 42. For every 100 females, there were 88.8 males. For every 100 females age 18 and over, there were 86.0 males.

The median income for a household in the borough was $30,616, and the median income for a family was $37,364. Males had a median income of $35,631 versus $20,440 for females. The per capita income for the borough was $15,035. About 7.4% of families and 9.9% of the population were below the poverty line, including 12.5% of those under age 18 and 8.9% of those age 65 or over.

== Education ==
Glassport is served by the South Allegheny School District.

== Politics ==
Presidential election results
Year	Republican	Democratic	Third parties
2020	53% 997	45% 843	1% 32
2016	56% 953	41% 684	3% 50
2012	54% 876	46% 744	1% 15
2008	45% 857	53% 1006	2% 40

== Geography ==
Glassport is located at 40°19′37″N 79°53′19″W.

According to the United States Census Bureau, the borough has a total area of 1.9 square miles (4.9 km^{2}), of which 1.7 square miles (4.4 km^{2}) is land and 0.2 square miles (0.52 km^{2}), or 11.05%, is water.

== Surrounding neighborhoods ==
Glassport has four land borders, including McKeesport to the north, Port Vue to the northeast, Liberty to the east, and Lincoln to the southeast. Across the Monongahela River to the west, Glassport runs adjacent with Dravosburg (with direct connector via Mansfield Bridge), West Mifflin, and Clairton (with direct connector via Clairton-Glassport Bridge).

== Emergency services ==
=== Police ===
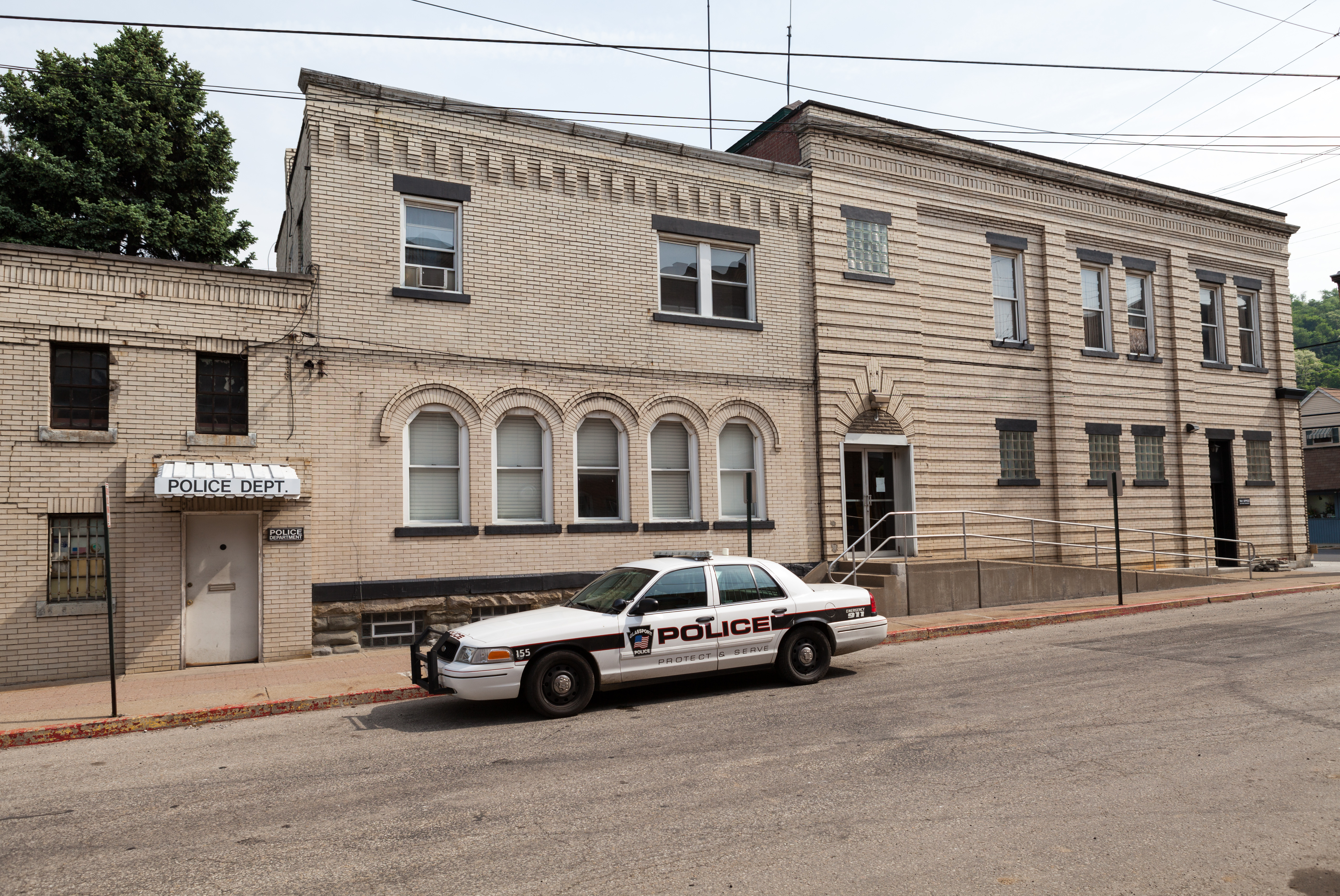
Police department and municipal building

Glassport Police Dept. is based at 440 Monongahela Ave. It has 10 full-time officers, a sergeant, a lieutenant, a deputy chief and a chief.

==== Glassport Crime Watch ====
GPCW is a group of Glassport residents who report crimes to GPD.

=== Fire & EMS ===
Citizen's Hose Co. #1 is based at 525 Allegheny Ave.

Emergency medical services are provided by the McKeesport Ambulance Rescue Service.

== See also ==
- Glassport Odds
