= West Mifflin, Pennsylvania =

Borough in Pennsylvania, US

- Borough
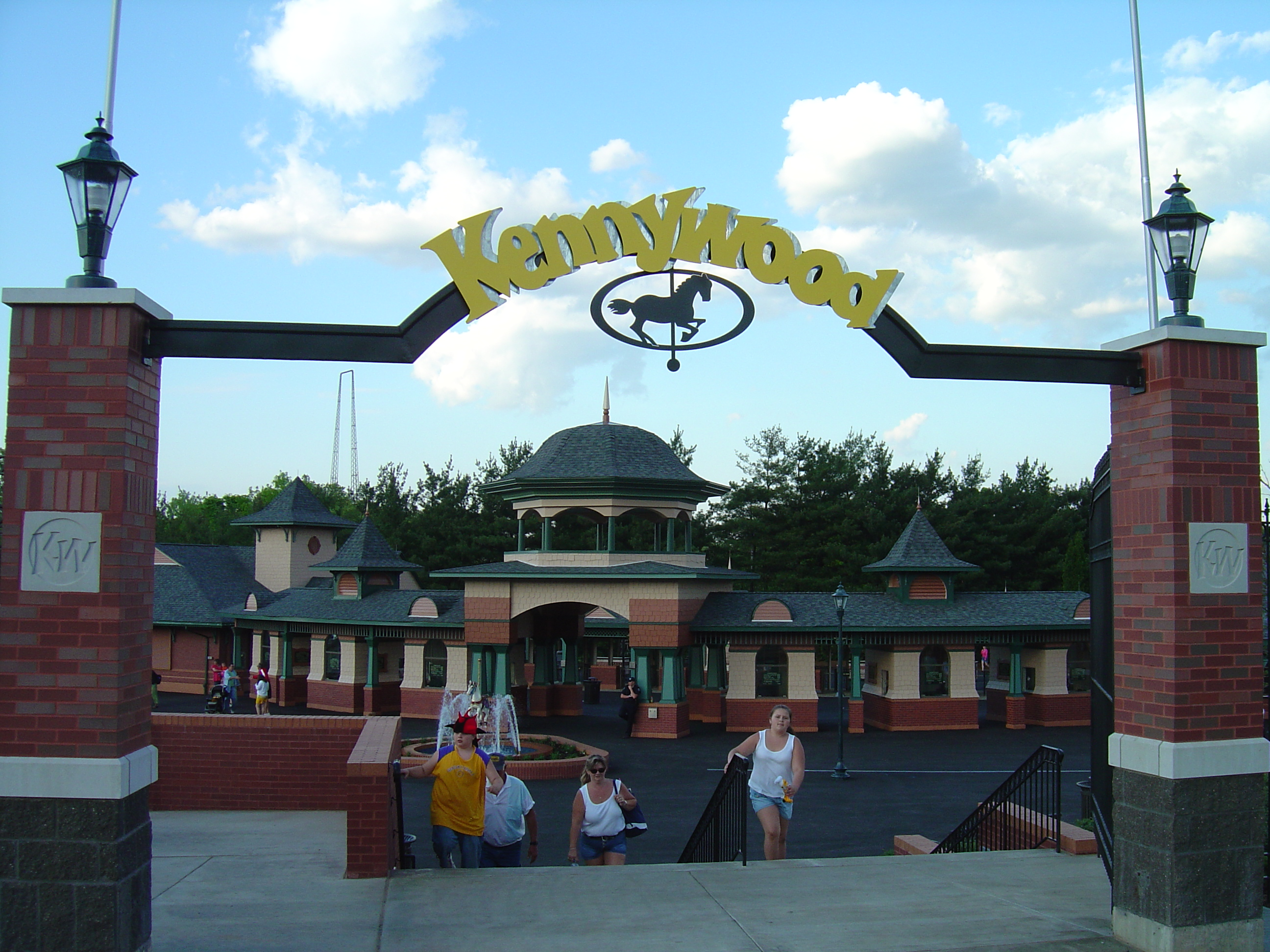
- Kennywood
- Interactive map of West Mifflin, Pennsylvania
- Location within Pennsylvania Location within the United States
- Coordinates: 40°22′5″N 79°53′51″W
- Country: United States
- State: Pennsylvania
- County: Allegheny
- Incorporated: 1788 (Mifflin Township)
- December 11, 1942 (Borough)

Government
  - Mayor: Chris Kelly

Area
  - Total: 14.50 sq mi (37.56 km^{2})
  - Land: 14.20 sq mi (36.79 km^{2})
  - Water: 0.29 sq mi (0.76 km^{2}) 1.8%

Population (2020)
  - Total: 19,589
  - Density: 1,386.6/sq mi (535.38/km^{2})
- Time zone: UTC-5 (EST)
  - Summer (DST): UTC-4 (EDT)
- ZIP code: 15122
- Area code: 878
- FIPS code: 42-83512
- Website: www.westmifflin.gov

West Mifflin is a borough in Allegheny County, Pennsylvania, United States, located southeast of Pittsburgh. The population was 19,589 at the 2020 census. It is named after Thomas Mifflin, the first governor of Pennsylvania and a U.S. Founding Father.

Although the borough is heavily residential, it is home to one of America's oldest traditional amusement parks, Kennywood Park. Other employers include the advanced naval nuclear propulsion technology research and development facility, Bettis Atomic Power Laboratory, monorail manufacturer Bombardier, US Steel's Mon Valley Works–Irvin Plant, Community College of Allegheny County's South Campus, and the Allegheny County Airport.

== Geography ==
According to the United States Census Bureau, the borough has a total area of 14.4 square miles (37 km^{2}), of which 14.2 square miles (37 km^{2}) is land and 0.3 square miles (0.78 km^{2}), or 1.80%, is water. The landscape is largely hilly and wooded, and the borough's eastern boundary is contiguous with the Monongahela River three separate times. Much of the original landscape has been altered as a result of the historic dumping of steel mill byproducts such as slag and fly ash.

West Mifflin has ten land borders, including the Pittsburgh neighborhoods of Lincoln Place and Hays as well as Munhall and Whitaker, to the north, Duquesne to the east, Dravosburg to the southeast, Jefferson Hills and Pleasant Hills to the south, Baldwin to the west and also a short border with Clairton to the south.

Three segments of West Mifflin run along the Monongahela River. Adjacent to these areas across the river are Braddock, North Braddock, McKeesport and Glassport.

== Demographics ==
Historical population
Census	Pop.	Note	%±
1940	8,694		—
1950	17,985		106.9%
1960	27,289		51.7%
1970	28,070		2.9%
1980	26,322		−6.2%
1990	23,644		−10.2%
2000	22,464		−5.0%
2010	20,313		−9.6%
2020	19,589		−3.6%

=== 2020 census ===
As of the 2020 census, West Mifflin had a population of 19,589. The median age was 44.8 years. 18.4% of residents were under the age of 18 and 22.1% of residents were 65 years of age or older. For every 100 females there were 92.3 males, and for every 100 females age 18 and over there were 89.8 males age 18 and over.

100.0% of residents lived in urban areas, while 0.0% lived in rural areas.

There were 8,709 households in West Mifflin, of which 24.0% had children under the age of 18 living in them. Of all households, 40.9% were married-couple households, 19.6% were households with a male householder and no spouse or partner present, and 32.2% were households with a female householder and no spouse or partner present. About 32.2% of all households were made up of individuals and 15.2% had someone living alone who was 65 years of age or older.

There were 9,407 housing units, of which 7.4% were vacant. The homeowner vacancy rate was 2.0% and the rental vacancy rate was 7.7%.

Racial composition as of the 2020 census
Race	Number	Percent
White	15,632	79.8%
Black or African American	2,489	12.7%
American Indian and Alaska Native	21	0.1%
Asian	185	0.9%
Native Hawaiian and Other Pacific Islander	2	0.0%
Some other race	204	1.0%
Two or more races	1,056	5.4%
Hispanic or Latino (of any race)	453	2.3%

=== 2000 census ===
As of the census of 2000, there were 22,464 people, 9,509 households, and 6,475 families residing in the borough. The population density was 1,586.2 inhabitants per square mile (612.4/km^{2}). There were 9,966 housing units at an average density of 703.7 per square mile (271.7/km^{2}). The racial makeup of the borough was 89.64% White, 8.85% African American, 0.12% Native American, 0.25% Asian, 0.06% Pacific Islander, 0.25% from other races, and 0.84% from two or more races. Hispanic or Latino of any race were 0.57% of the population.

There were 9,509 households, out of which 26.8% had children under the age of 18 living with them, 50.6% were married couples living together, 13.7% had a female householder with no husband present, and 31.9% were non-families. 29.0% of all households were made up of individuals, and 15.3% had someone living alone who was 65 years of age or older. The average household size was 2.35 and the average family size was 2.89.

In the borough the population was spread out, with 21.5% under the age of 18, 6.9% from 18 to 24, 26.2% from 25 to 44, 23.8% from 45 to 64, and 21.6% who were 65 years of age or older. The median age was 42 years. For every 100 females, there were 89.4 males. For every 100 females age 18 and over, there were 84.3 males.

=== Income and poverty ===
The median income for a household in the borough was $36,130, and the median income for a family was $46,192. Males had a median income of $36,984 versus $26,529 for females. The per capita income for the borough was $18,140. About 8.8% of families and 10.2% of the population were below the poverty line, including 16.6% of those under age 18 and 9.1% of those age 65 or over. The unemployment rate is just over 6%.

== Environment ==
Coal mining in the area has affected the flow and water quality of small streams. Land developers have produced more level ground by clean-filling ravines and other small parcels of land to improve the land usage. Toxic waste dump areas are monitored for water quality improvement with bioremediation successfully implemented. West Mifflin operates its own sewage treatment facility. The Environmental Protection agency regulates 78 facilities for environmental compliance. Asbestos waste and radioactive waste and controls were addressed in 1991.

== Government and politics ==
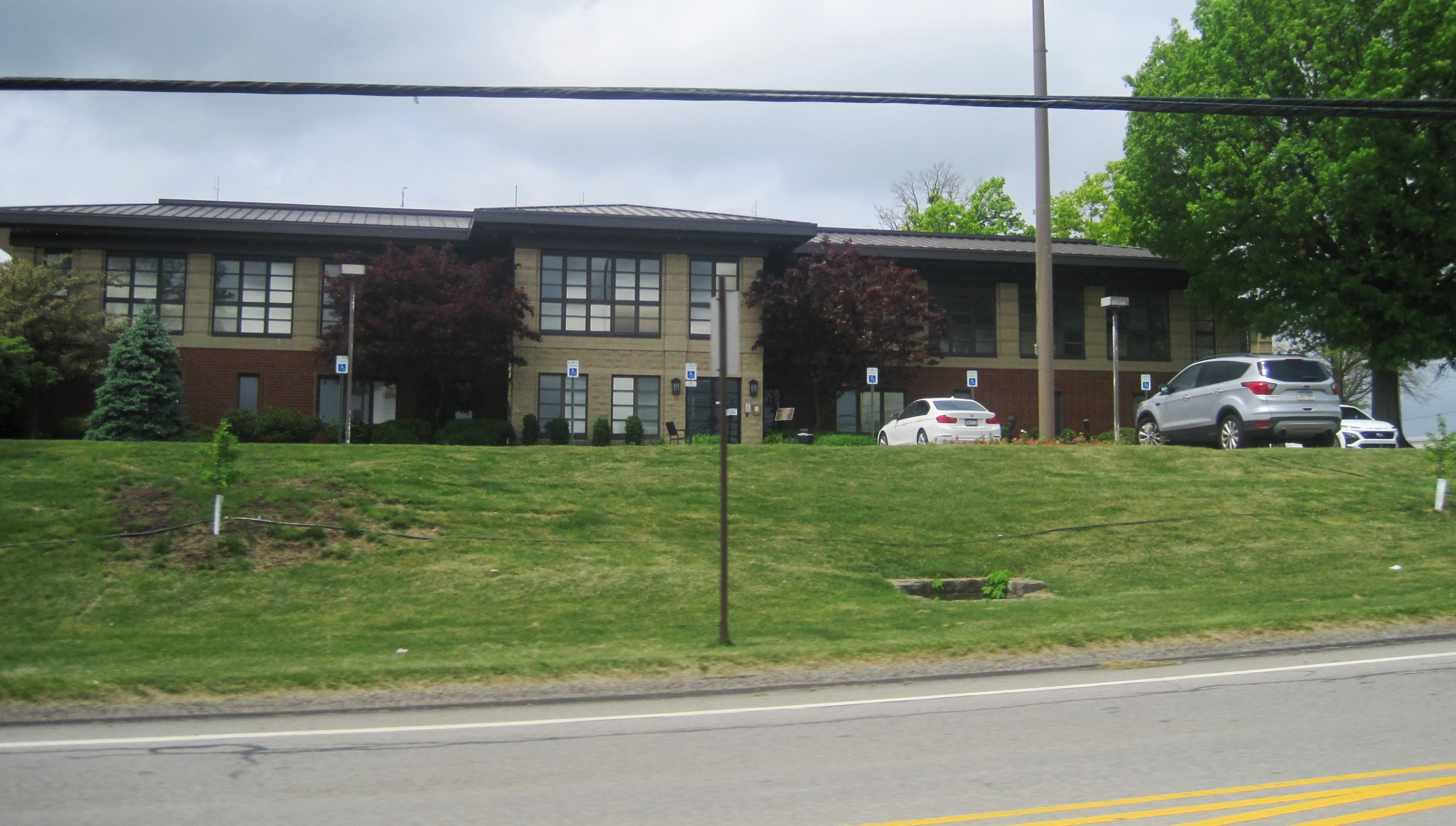
West Mifflin Municipal Building

As of 2026, the mayor of West Mifflin is Chris Kelly.

Presidential Elections Results
Year	Republican	Democratic	Third Parties
2020	48% 5,397	50% 5,703	1% 126
2016	49% 4,896	50% 4,930	1% 117
2012	42% 4,171	56% 5,568	2% 120

== Education ==
Seven schools exist in West Mifflin: four public schools and three private schools. West Mifflin public schools belong to one district, West Mifflin Area School District. School students in the neighboring boroughs of Whitaker and Duquesne also attend school in the West Mifflin School District. The West Mifflin School District charges tuition for nearby Duquesne students to attend.

There are two elementary schools, one middle school, West Mifflin Area High School, and 13 preschools. |}

Community College of Allegheny County also has its South Campus in the borough. Wilson Christian Academy was located in the borough, which merged into Cornerstone Christian Preparatory Academy in 2016.

== Transportation ==
West Mifflin is accessible primarily by road, though no Interstate highways pass through the area. The main road passing through most of the area is PA 885, which intersects with PA 51 nearby in the borough of Whitehall.

West Mifflin is the location of Allegheny County Airport, a general aviation airport; as a result, most of West Mifflin is in Class D airspace. The nearest airports with commercial service are Pittsburgh International Airport and Arnold Palmer Regional Airport.

Preceded by Brentwood	Bordering communities of Pittsburgh	Succeeded by Munhall
