= List of places in Pennsylvania: W–X =

This list of cities, towns, unincorporated communities, counties, and other recognized places in the U.S. state of Pennsylvania also includes information on the number and names of counties in which the place lies, and its lower and upper zip code bounds, if applicable.

(NOTE: there are no places in Pennsylvania starting with the letter "X".)

Name of place	Number of counties	Principal county	Lower zip code	Upper zip code
Wabank	1	Lancaster County		
Wabash	1	Allegheny County	15220	
Waddle	1	Centre County		
Wadesville	1	Schuylkill County	17901	
Wadsworth	1	Butler County		
Wadsworth	1	Philadelphia County	19150	
Wagner	1	Mifflin County	17841	
Wagners	1	Monroe County		
Wagnersville	1	Northampton County	18042	
Wago Junction	1	York County	17347	
Wagontown	1	Chester County	19376	
Wahlville	1	Butler County	16033	
Wakefield	1	Lancaster County		
Wakena Loyalhanna Twp	1	Westmoreland County	15681	
Walbert	1	Lehigh County	18104	
Walkchalk E Franklin Twp	1	Armstrong County	16201	
Walker Township	1	Centre County		
Walker Township	1	Huntingdon County		
Walker Township	1	Juniata County		
Walker Township	1	Schuylkill County		
Walkers Mill Collier Twp	1	Allegheny County	15106	
Walkertown Otto Twp	1	McKean County		
Walkertown West Pike Run Twp	1	Washington County	15427	
Walkton Lwr Towamensing Twp	1	Carbon County		
Wall	1	Allegheny County	15148	
Wall Rose Economy	1	Beaver County	15005	
Wallace City New Sewickley Twp	1	Beaver County		
Wallace Corners Mineral Twp	1	Venango County		
Wallace Junction Girard	1	Erie County	16417	
Wallace Township	1	Chester County		
Wallaceton	1	Clearfield County	16876	
Wallaceville Plum Twp	1	Venango County	16354	
Waller	1	Columbia County	17814	
Walley Mill	1	Butler County		
Wallingford	1	Delaware County	19086	
Wallis Run	1	Lycoming County	17771	
Walls Corners	1	Lackawanna County	18414	
Wallsville Benton Twp	1	Lackawanna County	18414	
Walltown Penn Twp	1	Clearfield County	16838	
Walnut Bend President Twp	1	Venango County	16301	
Walnut Bottom	1	Cumberland County	17266	
Walnut Grove Johnstown	1	Cambria County		
Walnut Grove Juniata Twp	1	Perry County	17074	
Walnutport	1	Northampton County	18088	
Walnuttown	1	Berks County	19522	
Walsall	1	Cambria County	15904	
Walston	1	Jefferson County	15781	
Walters Forks Twp	1	Northampton County	18042	
Waltersburg	1	Fayette County	15488	
Walther	1	Allegheny County		
Walton	1	Clearfield County		
Walton	1	Potter County		
Waltonville	1	Dauphin County	17036	
Waltrous	1	Tioga County		
Waltz	1	Westmoreland County	15679	
Waltz Mill	1	Westmoreland County		
Waltzvale	1	Clearfield County	16671	
Wampum	1	Lawrence County	16157	
Wanamakers	1	Lehigh County	19529	
Wanamie	1	Luzerne County	18634	
Wandin	1	Indiana County	15729	
Wandin Junction Green Twp	1	Indiana County		
Wapwallopen	1	Luzerne County	18660	
Ward Township	1	Tioga County		
Wardville Greenwood Twp	1	Perry County		
Warfordsburg	1	Fulton County	17267	
Warminster	1	Bucks County	18974	
Warminster Heights	1	Bucks County		
Warminster Township	1	Bucks County		
Warner Fallowfield Twp	1	Washington County	15022	
Warnertown Coolbaugh Twp	1	Monroe County		
Warren	1	Warren County	16365	
Warren Center	1	Bradford County	18851	
Warren South	1	Warren County		
Warren Township	1	Bradford County		
Warren Township	1	Franklin County		
Warrendale	1	Allegheny County	15086	
Warrenham	1	Bradford County		
Warrens Mill	1	Somerset County	15552	
Warrensville	1	Lycoming County	17701	
Warrington	1	Bucks County	18976	
Warrington Township	1	Bucks County		
Warrington Township	1	York County		
Warrior Ridge	1	Huntingdon County	16669	
Warrior Run	1	Luzerne County	18706	
Warrior Run	1	Northumberland County	17777	
Warriors Mark Township	1	Huntingdon County		
Warsaw	1	Lackawanna County	18512	
Warsaw	1	Luzerne County	18702	
Warsaw Township	1	Jefferson County		
Warwick	1	Chester County	19470	
Warwick Township	1	Bucks County		
Warwick Township	1	Chester County		
Warwick Township	1	Lancaster County		
Washington	1	Washington County	15301	
Washington Boro	1	Lancaster County	17582	
Washington Crossing	1	Bucks County	18977	
Washington Heights	1	Cumberland County	17043	
Washington Hill	1	Montgomery County	19464	
Washington Junction	1	Allegheny County		
Washington Lane	1	Philadelphia County		
Washington North	1	Washington County	15301	
Washington Square Whitpain Twp	1	Montgomery County		
Washington Township	1	Armstrong County		
Washington Township	1	Berks County		
Washington Township	1	Butler County		
Washington Township	1	Cambria County		
Washington Township	1	Clarion County		
Washington Township	1	Dauphin County		
Washington Township	1	Erie County		
Washington Township	1	Fayette County		
Washington Township	1	Franklin County		
Washington Township	1	Greene County		
Washington Township	1	Indiana County		
Washington Township	1	Jefferson County		
Washington Township	1	Lawrence County		
Washington Township	1	Lehigh County		
Washington Township	1	Lycoming County		
Washington Township	1	Northampton County		
Washington Township	1	Northumberland County		
Washington Township	1	Schuylkill County		
Washington Township	1	Snyder County		
Washington Township	1	Westmoreland County		
Washington Township	1	Wyoming County		
Washington Township	1	York County		
Washington West	1	Washington County	15301	
Washingtonville	1	Montour County	17884	
Wassergass	1	Northampton County	18055	
Water Street	1	Huntingdon County	16611	
Waterfall	1	Fulton County	16689	
Waterford	1	Erie County	16441	
Waterford Township	1	Erie County		
Waterloo	1	Juniata County	17021	
Waterloo Mills	1	Chester County	19333	
Waterman	1	Indiana County	15748	
Waterside	1	Bedford County	16695	
Waterson	1	Clarion County	16258	
Waterton	1	Luzerne County	18655	
Waterville	1	Lycoming County	17776	
Watkins	1	Cambria County	15722	
Watrous	1	Tioga County	16921	
Watson Crossing	1	Warren County	16313	
Watson Farm	1	Forest County	16239	
Watson Run	1	Crawford County	16316	
Watson Township	1	Lycoming County		
Watson Township	1	Warren County		
Watsontown	1	Northumberland County	17777	
Watters	1	Butler County	16033	
Wattersonville	1	Armstrong County	16218	
[[Watts Township, Pennsylvania	Watts Township]]	1	Perry County	
Watts Transfer	1	Fayette County		
Wattsburg	1	Erie County	16442	
Waverly	1	Lackawanna County	18471	
Wawa	1	Delaware County	19017	19063
Wayland E Mead Twp	1	Crawford County		
Waymart	1	Wayne County	18472	
Wayne	1	Delaware County	19087	
Wayne Heights	1	Franklin County	17268	
Wayne Junction	1	Philadelphia County		
Wayne Township	1	Armstrong County		
Wayne Township	1	Clinton County		
Wayne Township	1	Crawford County		
Wayne Township	1	Dauphin County		
Wayne Township	1	Erie County		
Wayne Township	1	Greene County		
Wayne Township	1	Lawrence County		
Wayne Township	1	Mifflin County		
Wayne Township	1	Schuylkill County		
Waynecastle	1	Franklin County	17225	
Waynesboro	1	Franklin County	17268	
Waynesburg	1	Greene County	15370	
Waynesville	1	Dauphin County	17032	
Weatherly	1	Carbon County	18255	
Weaver Mill	1	Westmoreland County	15677	
Weaverland	1	Lancaster County	17519	
Weavers Old Stand	1	Westmoreland County		
Weaversville	1	Northampton County	18067	
Weavertown	1	Berks County	19518	
Weavertown	1	Lancaster County	17505	
Weavertown	1	Lebanon County	17042	
Weavertown	1	Washington County	15317	
Weber City	1	Cameron County	15834	
Weber Hills	1	Erie County		
Webster	1	Schuylkill County		
Webster	1	Westmoreland County	15087	
Webster Mills	1	Fulton County	17233	
Wech Corners	1	Luzerne County		
Weeds Corners	1	Erie County		
Weedville	1	Elk County	15868	
Wegley	1	Westmoreland County	15642	
Wehnwood	1	Blair County	16601	
Wehrum	1	Indiana County		
Weidasville	1	Lehigh County	18078	
Weidmanville	1	Lancaster County	17522	
Weigelstown	1	York County	17315	
Weigh Scale	1	Northumberland County	17872	
Weigletown	1	Lawrence County		
Weikert	1	Union County	17885	
Weilersville	1	Lehigh County	18011	
Weimer	1	Indiana County		
Weinel Cross Roads	1	Westmoreland County	15656	
Weir Lake	1	Monroe County	18058	
Weis Library	1	Erie County		
Weisel	1	Bucks County	18944	
[[Weisenberg Township, Pennsylvania	Weisenberg Township]]	1	Lehigh County	
Weishample	1	Schuylkill County	17938	
Weissport	1	Carbon County	18235	
Weissport East	1	Carbon County	18235	
Welch	1	Somerset County		
Weldbank	1	Warren County		
Weldon	1	Montgomery County	19038	
Wellers	1	Warren County		
Wellersburg	1	Somerset County	15564	
Welliversville	1	Columbia County	17815	
Wells	1	Indiana County		
Wells Creek	1	Somerset County	15541	
Wells Hollow	1	Bradford County		
Wells Tannery	1	Fulton County	16691	
Wells Township	1	Bradford County		
Wells Township	1	Fulton County		
Wellsboro	1	Tioga County	16901	
Wellsboro Junction	1	Tioga County		
Wellsburg	1	Erie County		
Wellsville	1	York County	17365	
Welsh Hill	1	Susquehanna County	18470	
Welsh Run	1	Franklin County	17225	
Welty	1	Westmoreland County	15666	
Weltys	1	Franklin County	17268	
Weltytown	1	Westmoreland County		
Wendel	1	Westmoreland County	15691	
Wenks	1	Adams County	17304	
Wenksville	1	Adams County		
Wernersville	1	Lehigh County	18104	
Wentling Corners	1	Clarion County	16232	
Werkheiser	1	Northampton County		
Werleys Corner	1	Lehigh County	18066	
Wernersville	1	Berks County	19565	
Wernersville State Hospital	1	Berks County	19565	
Wertz	1	Blair County		
Wertzville	1	Cumberland County	17055	
Wescosville	1	Lehigh County	18106	
Wesley	1	Venango County	16038	
Wesley Chapel	1	Cambria County	15909	
Wesleyville	1	Erie County	16510	
West Abington Township	1	Lackawanna County		
West Acres	1	Union County	17837	
West Alexander	1	Washington County	15376	
West Aliquippa	1	Beaver County	15001	
West Ambler	1	Montgomery County	19002	
West Amity	1	Washington County		
West Annville	1	Lebanon County	17003	
West Apollo	1	Westmoreland County	15613	
West Athens	1	Bradford County		
West Auburn	1	Susquehanna County	18623	
West Bangor	1	Northampton County	18013	
West Bangor	1	York County	17314	
West Beaver Township	1	Snyder County		
West Beech	1	Centre County		
West Belle Vernon	1	Washington County		
West Bellevue	1	Allegheny County	15202	
West Belt Junction	1	Allegheny County		
West Bend	1	Fayette County	15433	
West Berwick	1	Columbia County	18603	
West Bethany	1	Westmoreland County		
West Bethlehem Township	1	Washington County		
West Bingham	1	Potter County	16923	
West Bolivar	1	Westmoreland County	15923	
West Bowmans	1	Carbon County		
West Bowmanstown	1	Carbon County		
West Bradford Township	1	Chester County		
West Branch	1	Cambria County	15714	
West Branch Township	1	Potter County		
West Brandywine Township	1	Chester County		
West Bridgewater	1	Beaver County	15009	
West Bristol	1	Bucks County	19007	
West Brownsville	1	Washington County	15417	
West Brownsville Junction	1	Washington County	15418	
West Brunswick Township	1	Schuylkill County		
West Buffalo Township	1	Union County		
West Burlington	1	Bradford County	16947	
West Burlington Township	1	Bradford County		
West Caln Township	1	Chester County		
West Cameron	1	Northumberland County	17872	
West Cameron Township	1	Northumberland County		
West Carroll Township	1	Cambria County		
West Catasauqua	1	Lehigh County	18052	
West Chester	1	Chester County	19380	82
West Chillisquaque Township	1	Northumberland County		
West Clifford	1	Susquehanna County	18470	
West Cocalico Township	1	Lancaster County		
West Conshohocken	1	Montgomery County	19428	
West Coplay	1	Lehigh County		
West Cornwall Township	1	Lebanon County		
West Creek	1	Cameron County	15834	
West Cressona	1	Schuylkill County	17929	
West Damascus	1	Wayne County	18469	
West Darlington	1	Beaver County		
West Decatur	1	Clearfield County	16878	
West Deer Township	1	Allegheny County		
West Derry	1	Westmoreland County	15627	
West Donegal Township	1	Lancaster County		
West Earl Township	1	Lancaster County		
West Easton	1	Northampton County	18042	
West Eldred	1	McKean County	16731	
West Elizabeth	1	Allegheny County	15088	
West Ellwood Junction	1	Beaver County	16136	
West End	1	Allegheny County		
West End	1	Bedford County		
West End	1	Dauphin County	17102	
West Enola	1	Cumberland County	17025	
West Etna	1	Allegheny County	15223	
West Export	1	Westmoreland County	15632	
West Fairfield	1	Westmoreland County	15944	
West Fairview	1	Cumberland County	17025	
West Fallowfield Township	1	Chester County		
West Fallowfield Township	1	Crawford County		
West Falls	1	Wyoming County	18615	
West Fayetteville	1	Franklin County	17222	
West Finley	1	Washington County	15377	
West Finley Township	1	Washington County		
West Ford City	1	Armstrong County		
West Franklin	1	Bradford County	18832	
West Franklin Township	1	Armstrong County		
West Freedom	1	Clarion County	16049	
West Gate Hills	1	Delaware County	19083	
West Goshen	1	Chester County		
West Goshen Hills	1	Chester County	19380	
West Goshen Park	1	Chester County	19380	
West Goshen Township	1	Chester County		
West Greene	1	Erie County		
West Grove	1	Chester County	19390	
West Hamburg	1	Berks County	19526	
West Hanover Township	1	Dauphin County		
West Hazleton	1	Luzerne County	18201	
West Hemlock Township	1	Montour County		
West Hempfield Township	1	Lancaster County		
West Hickory	1	Forest County	16370	
West Hill	1	Cumberland County	17013	
West Hills	1	Armstrong County		
West Hills Estates	1	Lycoming County	17701	
West Hoffman	1	Allegheny County	15101	
West Homestead	1	Allegheny County	15120	
West Jeannette	1	Westmoreland County	15644	
West Jonestown	1	Lebanon County	17038	
West Keating Township	1	Clinton County		
West Kittanning	1	Armstrong County	16201	
West Lampeter Township	1	Lancaster County		
West Lancaster	1	Lancaster County	17603	
West Lawn	1	Berks County	19609	
West Lawn	1	Union County	17837	
West Lebanon	1	Indiana County	15783	
West Lebanon	1	Lebanon County	17042	
West Lebanon Township	1	Lebanon County		
West Leechburg	1	Westmoreland County	15656	
West Leesport	1	Berks County	19533	
West Leisenring	1	Fayette County	15489	
West Lenox	1	Susquehanna County	18826	
West Leroy	1	Bradford County	17724	
West Liberty	1	Allegheny County		
West Liberty	1	Butler County	16057	
West Liberty	1	Clearfield County	15801	
West Library	1	Allegheny County	15102	
West Mahanoy Township	1	Schuylkill County		
West Mahoning Township	1	Indiana County		
West Manayunk	1	Montgomery County	19151	
West Manchester Township	1	York County		
West Manheim Township	1	York County		
West Marietta	1	Lancaster County	17547	
West Market	1	Philadelphia County	19139	
West Market Street	1	Philadelphia County	19139	
West Marlborough Township	1	Chester County		
West Mayfield	1	Beaver County	15010	
West Mead Township	1	Crawford County		
West Meyersdale	1	Somerset County	15552	
West Middlesex	1	Mercer County	16159	
West Middletown	1	Washington County	15379	
West Mifflin	1	Allegheny County	15122	
West Millcreek	1	Erie County		
West Milton	1	Union County	17886	
West Monesson	1	Washington County		
West Monocacy	1	Berks County	19518	
West Monterey	1	Clarion County	16049	
West Morrisville	1	Bucks County		
West Mosgrove	1	Armstrong County		
West Moshannon	1	Clearfield County	16651	
West Myerstown	1	Lebanon County	17067	
West Nanticoke	1	Luzerne County	18634	
West Nantmeal Township	1	Chester County		
West New Castle	1	Lawrence County		
West New Kensington	1	Allegheny County	15030	
West Newton	1	Westmoreland County	15089	
West Nicholson	1	Wyoming County	18446	
West Norriton	1	Montgomery County	19401	
West Norriton Township	1	Montgomery County		
West Nottingham Township	1	Chester County		
West Overton	1	Fayette County		
West Overton	1	Westmoreland County	15683	
West Park	1	Allegheny County	15136	
West Park	1	Philadelphia County	19131	
West Pen Argyl	1	Northampton County	18072	
West Penn	1	Schuylkill County	17960	
West Penn Township	1	Schuylkill County		
West Pennsboro Township	1	Cumberland County		
West Perry Township	1	Snyder County		
West Philadelphia	1	Philadelphia County	19104	
West Pike	1	Potter County	16922	
West Pike Run Township	1	Washington County		
West Pikeland Township	1	Chester County		
West Pittsburg	1	Lawrence County	16160	
West Pittston	1	Luzerne County	18643	
West Pittston Junction	1	Luzerne County	16160	
West Point	1	Cambria County	15942	
West Point	1	Montgomery County	19486	
West Point Marion	1	Greene County		
West Pottsgrove Township	1	Montgomery County		
West Providence Township	1	Bedford County		
West Reading	1	Berks County	19611	
West Renovo	1	Clinton County	17764	
West Ridge	1	Erie County	16506	
West Ridge	1	Lancaster County	17603	
West Rockhill Township	1	Bucks County		
West Sadsbury Township	1	Chester County		
West Saint Clair Township	1	Bedford County		
West Salem Township	1	Mercer County		
West Salisbury	1	Somerset County	15565	
West Saxonburg	1	Butler County		
West Scranton	1	Lackawanna County	18504	
West Sheffield	1	Warren County	16347	
West Shenango Township	1	Crawford County		
West Side	1	Luzerne County	18634	
West Side	1	Westmoreland County	15089	
West Spring Creek	1	Warren County	16407	
West Springfield	1	Erie County	16443	
West Sunbury	1	Butler County	16061	
West Tarentum	1	Allegheny County	15084	
West Taylor Township	1	Cambria County		
West Telford	1	Montgomery County	18969	
West Torresdale	1	Philadelphia County		
West Township	1	Huntingdon County		
West Union	1	Greene County	15364	
West Valley	1	Armstrong County	16201	
West Vandergrift	1	Westmoreland County	15690	
West Vernon	1	Crawford County		
West View	1	Allegheny County	15229	
West Vincent Township	1	Chester County		
West Warren	1	Bradford County	13812	
West Wayne	1	Delaware County		
West Waynesburg	1	Greene County	15370	
West Wheatfield Township	1	Indiana County		
West Whiteland Township	1	Chester County		
West William Penn	1	Schuylkill County	17975	
West Willow	1	Lancaster County	17583	
West Wilmerding	1	Allegheny County	15137	
West Winfield	1	Butler County	16023	
West Wyoming	1	Luzerne County	18644	
West Wyomissing	1	Berks County	19609	
West York	1	York County	17404	
West Zollarsville	1	Washington County	15345	
Westaway	1	Montgomery County	19444	
Westbrook Park	1	Delaware County	19018	19036
Westcolang	1	Pike County		
Western State School and Hospital	1	Washington County	15317	
Westfall Township	1	Pike County		
Westfield	1	Tioga County	16950	
Westfield Terrace	1	York County	17070	
Westfield Township	1	Tioga County		
Westford	1	Crawford County	16134	
Westgate Hills	1	Northampton County	18017	
Westinghouse	1	Allegheny County		
Westinghouse Village	1	Delaware County	19029	
Westland	1	Washington County	15378	
Westline	1	McKean County	16751	
Westminster	1	Erie County	16506	
Westminster	1	Luzerne County	18702	
Westminster Manor	1	Allegheny County	15241	
Westmont	1	Blair County		
Westmont	1	Cambria County	15905	
Westmont	1	Lebanon County	17042	
Westmoreland	1	Philadelphia County		
Westmoreland City	1	Westmoreland County	15692	
Weston	1	Bradford County		
Weston	1	Luzerne County	18256	
Weston Place	1	Schuylkill County	17976	
Westover	1	Clearfield County	16692	
Westover Woods	1	Montgomery County	19401	
Westport	1	Clinton County	17778	
Westtown	1	Chester County	19395	
Westtown Acres	1	Chester County	19380	
Westtown Township	1	Chester County		
Westview Heights	1	Lawrence County		
Westville	1	Jefferson County	15824	
Westwood	1	Allegheny County		
Westwood	1	Cambria County	15905	
Westwood	1	Chester County	19302	
Westwood Heights	1	Lehigh County		
Westwood Hills	1	Allegheny County	15133	
Westwood Park	1	Delaware County	19083	
Wetherill Junction	1	Schuylkill County		
Wetherills Corner	1	Montgomery County		
Wetmore	1	McKean County	16735	
Wetmore Township	1	McKean County		
Wetona	1	Bradford County	16914	
Wexford	1	Allegheny County	15090	
Weyant	1	Bedford County	16655	
Wharton	1	Potter County	16720	
Wharton Furnace	1	Fayette County		
Wharton Township	1	Fayette County		
Wharton Township	1	Potter County		
Wheat Sheaf	1	Bucks County		
Wheatfield Township	1	Perry County		
Wheatland	1	Lancaster County		
Wheatland	1	Mercer County	16161	
Wheatland Hills	1	Lancaster County	17604	
Wheeler	1	Fayette County	15425	
Wheelerville	1	Sullivan County	17768	
Wheelock	1	Erie County		
Whetham	1	Clinton County		
Whig Hill	1	Forest County	16330	
Whipkeys-Dam	1	Somerset County	15551	
Whiskerville	1	Butler County	16040	
Whitaker	1	Allegheny County	15120	
White	1	Fayette County	15490	
White	1	Indiana County	15681	
White Bear	1	Berks County	19508	
White Deer	1	Union County	17887	
White Deer Township	1	Union County		
White Hall	1	Montour County	17821	
White Haven	1	Luzerne County	18661	
White Hill	1	Cumberland County	17011	
White Horse	1	Bucks County		
White Horse	1	Lancaster County	17527	
White House	1	Fayette County	15478	
White Marsh Junction	1	Montgomery County		
White Marsh Village	1	Delaware County	19064	
White Mill	1	Cambria County		
White Mill Crossing	1	Cambria County		
White Mills	1	Wayne County	18473	
White Oak	1	Allegheny County	15131	
White Oak	1	Lancaster County	17545	
White Oak Manor	1	Northampton County	18024	
White Pine	1	Lycoming County	17771	
White Rock	1	Lancaster County		
White Rocks	1	Franklin County		
White Spring	1	Dauphin County		
White Springs	1	Union County	17844	
White Township	1	Beaver County	15010	
White Township	1	Cambria County		
White Township	1	Indiana County		
White Valley	1	Westmoreland County	15632	
Whitehall	1	Adams County	17340	
Whitehall	1	Allegheny County	15227	
Whitehall	1	Lehigh County	18052	
Whitehall Park	1	Montgomery County	19401	
Whitehall Township	1	Lehigh County		
Whitehorse	1	Chester County	19073	
Whiteland Crest	1	Chester County	19341	
Whiteland Farms	1	Chester County	19355	
Whiteley Township	1	Greene County		
Whitemarsh	1	Montgomery County		
Whitemarsh Downs	1	Montgomery County	19075	
Whitemarsh Estates	1	Montgomery County	19444	
Whitemarsh Greens	1	Montgomery County	19444	
Whitemarsh Hills	1	Montgomery County	19444	
Whitemarsh Township	1	Montgomery County		
Whitemarsh Valley Farms	1	Montgomery County	19444	
Whitepine	1	Lycoming County		
Whites	1	Lackawanna County		
Whites Crossing	1	Lackawanna County	18407	
Whites Ferry	1	Wyoming County	18657	
Whites Hill	1	Westmoreland County	15697	
Whites Valley	1	Wayne County	18453	
Whitesburg	1	Armstrong County	16201	
Whiteside	1	Clearfield County	16651	
Whitesprings	1	Union County	17844	
Whitestown	1	Butler County	16052	
Whitewood	1	Bucks County		
Whitfield	1	Berks County	19609	
Whitford	1	Chester County	19341	
Whitney	1	Westmoreland County	15693	
Whitneyville	1	Tioga County		
Whitpain Township	1	Montgomery County		
Whitsett	1	Fayette County	15473	
Whitsett Junction	1	Fayette County		
Wick	1	Butler County	16057	
Wick City	1	Armstrong County	16201	
Wick Haven	1	Fayette County		
Wickerham Manor	1	Washington County	15063	
Wickerham Manor-Fisher	1	Washington County		
Wickerton	1	Chester County	19390	
Wickham Village	1	Beaver County	15001	
Wickhaven	1	Fayette County	15492	
Wiconisco	1	Dauphin County	17097	
Wiconisco Center	1	Dauphin County		
Wiconisco Township	1	Dauphin County		
Widener College	1	Delaware County	19013	
Widnoon	1	Armstrong County	16261	
Wiegletown	1	Lawrence County	16101	
Wiester	1	Westmoreland County	15632	
Wiggans	1	Schuylkill County	17948	
Wigton	1	Clearfield County		
Wigwam	1	McKean County		
Wila	1	Perry County	17074	
Wilawana	1	Bradford County	18840	
Wilbur	1	Lehigh County		
Wilbur	1	Somerset County	15563	
Wilburton	1	Columbia County	17888	
Wilburton Number One	1	Columbia County		
Wilburton Number Two	1	Columbia County		
Wilco Hill	1	Westmoreland County	15087	
Wilcox	1	Elk County	15870	
Wildcat	1	Clarion County	16248	
Wilden	1	Northampton County		
Wilden Acres	1	Northampton County	18042	
Wildwood	1	Allegheny County	15091	
Wildwood	1	Union County		
Wildwood Springs	1	Cambria County		
Wiley	1	York County	17363	
Wiley Heights	1	Greene County	15320	
Wilgus	1	Indiana County	15742	
Wilkes-Barre	1	Luzerne County	18701	73
Wilkes-Barre/Scranton International Airport	1	Luzerne County	18641	
Wilkes-Barre Township	1	Luzerne County	18702	
Wilkins Township	1	Allegheny County	15145	
Wilkinsburg	1	Allegheny County	15221	
Wilko Hill	1	Westmoreland County		
Will O Wood	1	Bucks County		
Willet	1	Indiana County	15732	
William Penn	1	Schuylkill County		
William Penn Annex	1	Philadelphia County	19107	
William Penn Manor	1	Northampton County	18017	
Williams	1	Jefferson County	15767	
Williams	1	Montgomery County		
Williams	1	Somerset County		
Williams Grove	1	Cumberland County	17055	
Williams Township	1	Dauphin County		
Williams Township	1	Northampton County		
Williamsburg	1	Blair County	16693	
Williamsburg	1	Clarion County	16214	
Williamson	1	Franklin County	17270	
Williamson School	1	Delaware County	19063	
Williamsport	1	Lycoming County	17701	
Williamsport-Lycoming County Airport	1	Lycoming County	17754	
Williamstown	1	Dauphin County	17098	
Williamstown	1	Lancaster County		
Williamstown	1	Washington County	15322	
Williamsville	1	McKean County		
Williard	1	Tioga County		
Willis Park	1	York County		
Willistown	1	Chester County		
Willistown Township	1	Chester County		
Willock	1	Allegheny County	15236	
Willopenn	1	Bucks County	18966	
Willow Grove	1	Lawrence County	16101	
Willow Grove	1	Montgomery County	19090	
Willow Grove Naval Air Station	1	Montgomery County	19090	
Willow Hill	1	Franklin County	17271	
Willow Lake	1	Schuylkill County		
Willow Springs	1	Columbia County	17815	
Willow Springs	1	Westmoreland County	15642	
Willow Street	1	Lancaster County	17584	
Willow Tree	1	Greene County		
Willow View Heights	1	Lancaster County	17602	
Willowbrook	1	Delaware County	19062	
Willowburn	1	Delaware County	19085	
Willowdale	1	Chester County	19348	
Wills Creek	1	Bedford County	15545	
Wilmer	1	Chester County	19460	
Wilmer	1	Elk County		
Wilmerding	1	Allegheny County	15148	
Wilmington Junction	1	Lawrence County		
Wilmington Township	1	Lawrence County		
Wilmington Township	1	Mercer County		
Wilmore	1	Cambria County	15962	
Wilmore Heights	1	Cambria County	15946	
Wilmot	1	Bradford County		
Wilmot Township	1	Bradford County		
Wilpen	1	Westmoreland County	15658	
Wilshire Hills	1	Lancaster County	17603	
Wilshire Hills	1	York County	17402	
Wilson	1	Allegheny County	15025	
Wilson	1	Clarion County		
Wilson	1	Northampton County	18042	
Wilson Creek	1	Somerset County	15557	
Wilson Mills	1	Venango County		
Wilsons Corners	1	Chester County	19460	
Wilsonville	1	Pike County		
Wimmers	1	Lackawanna County	18436	
Winburne	1	Clearfield County	16879	
Windber	1	Somerset County	15963	
Winder Village	1	Bucks County	19007	
Windfall	1	Bradford County	16926	
Wind Gap	1	Northampton County	18091	
Wind Ridge	1	Greene County	15380	
Windgap	1	Northampton County	18091	
Windham	1	Bradford County		
Windham Center	1	Bradford County	13812	
Windham Summit	1	Bradford County		
Windham Township	1	Bradford County		
Windham Township	1	Wyoming County		
Winding Heights	1	Cumberland County		
Winding Hill	1	Cumberland County	17055	
Windom	1	Lancaster County		
Windsor	1	York County	17366	
Windsor Castle	1	Berks County	19526	
Windsor Farms	1	Dauphin County	17110	
Windsor Park	1	Cumberland County	17055	
Windsor Park	1	York County	17403	
Windsor Township	1	Berks County		
Windsor Township	1	York County		
Windward Heights	1	Butler County	16001	
Windy City	1	Elk County		
Windy Gap	1	Greene County		
Winfield	1	Union County	17889	
Winfield Junction	1	Butler County		
Winfield Township	1	Butler County		
Wingate	1	Centre County	16823	
Wingerton	1	Franklin County		
Winona Homes	1	Delaware County	19074	
Winslow	1	Jefferson County		
Winslow Township	1	Jefferson County		
Winstead	1	Fayette County	15474	
Winterburne	1	Clearfield County	15849	
Winterdale	1	Wayne County	13783	
Winterset	1	Cambria County		
Winterstown	1	York County	17356	
Wintersville	1	Berks County	17087	
Winton	1	Lackawanna County		
Wireton	1	Allegheny County	15092	
Wiscasset	1	Monroe County	18344	
Wishaw	1	Jefferson County	15851	
Wismer	1	Bucks County	18947	
Wissahickon	1	Philadelphia County		
Wissahickon Village	1	Montgomery County	19444	
Wissingers	1	Sullivan County		
Wissingertown	1	Cambria County		
Wissinoming	1	Philadelphia County	19135	
Wister	1	Philadelphia County		
Witinski Villa	1	Luzerne County	18706	
Witmer	1	Lancaster County	17585	
Wittenberg	1	Somerset County		
Wittmer	1	Allegheny County	15116	
Woddale	1	Fayette County		
Wolf Creek Township	1	Mercer County		
Wolf Run	1	McKean County		
Wolf Township	1	Lycoming County		
Wolfdale	1	Washington County	15301	
Wolfs Corner	1	Clarion County	16353	
Wolfs Crossroads	1	Northumberland County	17081	
Wolfs Store	1	Centre County		
Wolfsburg	1	Bedford County	15522	
Wolftown	1	Allegheny County	15104	
Wolverton	1	Northumberland County	17868	
Womelsdorf	1	Berks County	19567	
Wood	3	Bedford County	16694	
Wood	3	Fulton County	16694	
Wood	3	Huntingdon County	16694	
Wood	1	Bucks County		
Wood Hill	1	Venango County		
Wood Run	1	Washington County		
Wood Township	1	Huntingdon County		
Woodale	1	Monroe County	18301	
Woodbine	1	Butler County		
Woodbine	1	York County	17302	
Woodbourne	1	Bucks County	19047	
Woodbridgetown	1	Fayette County	15478	
Woodburn	1	Susquehanna County		
Woodbury	1	Bedford County	16695	
Woodbury Township	1	Bedford County		
Woodbury Township	1	Blair County		
Woodchoppertown	1	Berks County	19512	
Woodcock	1	Crawford County	16433	
Woodcock Township	1	Crawford County		
Woodcock Grange	1	Crawford County		
Woodcrest	1	Chester County	19380	
Wooddale	1	Fayette County	15666	
Wooddale	1	Monroe County		
Woodglen	1	Fayette County		
Woodhill	1	Bucks County	18940	
Woodhouse	1	Susquehanna County		
Woodland	1	Clearfield County	16881	
Woodland	1	Mifflin County	17084	
Woodland Heights	1	Venango County	16301	
Woodland Park	1	Lycoming County	17701	
Woodland View	1	York County	17402	
Woodlawn	1	Beaver County	15001	
Woodlawn	1	Lancaster County	17603	
Woodlawn	1	Lehigh County	18104	
Woodlawn	1	Westmoreland County	15644	
Woodlyn	1	Delaware County	19094	
Woodlyn Manor	1	Delaware County	19094	
Woodlyn Park	1	Delaware County	19094	
Woodmere Park	1	Delaware County	19083	
Woodmont	1	Montgomery County		
Woodrow	1	Washington County	15340	
Woodruff	1	Greene County		
Woods Run	1	Allegheny County		
Woodside	1	Bucks County	19067	
Woodside	1	Fayette County	15478	
Woodside	1	Luzerne County	18224	
Woodside	1	York County		
Woodside-Drifton	1	Luzerne County		
Woodstock	1	Franklin County		
Woodstown	1	Somerset County	15935	
Woodvale	1	Cambria County		
Woodvale Heights	1	Cambria County	15901	
Woodview	1	Delaware County	19073	
Woodville	1	Allegheny County	15106	
Woodville	1	Chester County		
Woodville State Hospital	1	Allegheny County	15106	
Woodward	1	Centre County	16882	
Woodward Township	1	Clearfield County		
Woodward Township	1	Clinton County		
Woodward Township	1	Lycoming County		
Woodycrest	1	Centre County	16801	
Woolrich	1	Clinton County	17779	
Wopsononock	1	Blair County	16636	
Worcester	1	Montgomery County	19490	
Worcester Township	1	Montgomery County		
Wordan Place	1	Luzerne County	18618	
Worleytown	1	Franklin County	17225	
Worman	1	Berks County	19518	
Wormleysburg	1	Cumberland County	17043	
Worth Township	1	Butler County		
Worth Township	1	Centre County		
Worth Township	1	Mercer County		
Worthington	1	Armstrong County	16262	
Worthville	1	Jefferson County	15784	
Woxall	1	Montgomery County	18979	
Wright Township	1	Luzerne County		
Wrights	1	McKean County	16743	
Wrights Corners	1	McKean County	16749	
Wrights View	1	Sullivan County		
Wrightsdale	1	Lancaster County	17563	
Wrightstown	1	Bucks County	18940	
Wrightstown Township	1	Bucks County		
Wrightsville	1	Warren County	16340	
Wrightsville	1	York County	17368	
Wurtemburg	2	Beaver County	16117	
Wurtemburg	2	Lawrence County	16117	
Wyalusing	1	Bradford County	18853	
Wyalusing Township	1	Bradford County		
Wyano	1	Westmoreland County	15695	
Wyattville	1	Venango County	16323	
Wycombe	1	Bucks County	18980	
Wydnor	1	Northampton County	18015	
Wyebrooke	1	Chester County	19344	
Wylandville	1	Washington County	15330	
Wylie	1	Allegheny County	15025	15219
Wyncote	1	Montgomery County	19095	
Wyncote Hills	1	Montgomery County	19095	
Wyncroft	1	Delaware County	19063	
Wyndham Hills	1	York County	17403	
Wyndmoor	1	Montgomery County	19038	
Wyndmoor	1	Philadelphia County		
Wyndmoor Valley	1	Montgomery County	19075	
Wynglade Park	1	Delaware County	19083	
Wynn	1	Fayette County	15401	
Wynnefield	1	Philadelphia County		
Wynnefield Ave.	1	Philadelphia County		
Wynnewood	1	Bucks County	19067	
Wynnewood	1	Montgomery County	19096	
Wyoanna	1	Wyoming County		
Wyola	1	Delaware County	19073	
Wyoming	1	Luzerne County	18644	
Wyoming Camp Ground	1	Luzerne County	18708	
Wyomissing	1	Berks County	19610	
Wyomissing Hills	1	Berks County	19609	
Wyomissing Junction	1	Berks County	19610	
Wyside	1	Cameron County		
Wysox	1	Bradford County	18854	
Wysox Township	1	Bradford County		
