= Whitehall Branch =

Railroad in Pennsylvania, United States

The Whitehall Branch was a rail line owned and operated by the Pennsylvania Railroad in the U.S. state of Pennsylvania. The line ran from Monongahela Branch near the 30th Street yard to a connection with the Pittsburgh and Lake Erie Railroad and the Allegheny and South Side Railway at the 21st Street Yard in the South Side of Pittsburgh. The line was abandoned by Conrail and has been removed.

== History ==
After encouraging the development of the Pittsburgh and Lake Erie Railroad (P&LE) east of downtown Pittsburgh to give competition for traffic from his Oliver Iron and Steel Company, Henry W. Oliver set about arranging for direct competition for the P&LE, looking back to the Pennsylvania Railroad to provide that. Under an 1882 charter, sufficient for any railroad purpose but with the stated purpose of building a 7-mile passenger line to the future suburb of Whitehall, a line was constructed parallel to and across sidings of the P&LE serving industries from South 3rd St. to South 21st St. The line was known as the Pittsburgh and Whitehall Railroad. It connected to an existing branch of the Pennsylvania Railroad by traversing an easement in a reservation in the center of South 21st St. obtained from the heirs of the Ormsby estate. The easement in the reservation was adjacent to the existing narrow gauge railroad of the Birmingham Coal Company, for whom it connected a coal incline leading to the Ormsby Mine opened by Birmingham Coal predecessor Keeling Coal Company. The mine was near St. Patrick Street. The railroad ran from the base of the incline at Quarry St. to the river. At the time, that part of the South Side was the independent community of East Birmingham and the street was known first as Oliver St., then Railroad St.

The Whitehall Branch consisted of the Pittsburgh and Whitehall, sold by the Oliver interests to the Pittsburgh, Virginia and Charleston Railway, predecessor of the PRR Monongahela Branch, on March 27, 1888 (with a certificate of consolidation filed May 14, 1888), including the trackage parallel to the narrow gauge coal line along South 21st St., and additional trackage along Mary St. running east from South 21st St. parallel to the Monongahela Branch until it joined it near 30th St. yard. Later the PRR would lease back the stretch parallel to the P&LE to Oliver Iron's captive Allegheny and South Side Railway. Railway Age mentions a $75,000 purchase price in its September 27, 1905 issue, which seems late for this purchase.

Industries served included:

- U.S. Glass Factory B, Gimbel Brothers (formerly Kaufman and Baer) and John Eichleay Jr. Company, near the P&LE railroad at S. 21st St.;
- Bailey-Farrell Manufacturing, on South 21st at Sidney St.;
- Armour, Swift and Morris butcheries on 3 of the 4 corners of South 21st St. and East Carson St.;
- The Duquesne Brewing Company at South 21st and Mary Streets;
- Iron City Sash Door, Phillips Mill and Mine Supply, and D.O. Cunningham Glass along Mary St.; and
- The J&L Steel warehouse on the site of the second Cunningham Glass plant, between South 26th and South 27th Streets. The Morris butchery, at 2101 E. Carson, later became Jersey Farm Products, a food products distributor.

Additionally, the line crossed the Carson St. double track streetcar line of the Pittsburgh Railways Company until its 1966 abandonment, and the Sarah St. horsecar line until its abandonment in 1923.

The Pennsylvania Railroad, and later Penn Central and then Conrail, operated the line; Conrail filed to abandon it the week of July 3, 1992 as filing AB-167, Sub. 326N.
