= Keeling Coal Company =

Coordinates: 40°25′06″N 79°58′47″W

The Keeling Coal Company (1861–1878) was a 19th-century coal mining company in Allegheny County, Pennsylvania. Its mines were located in the Pittsburgh Coalfield of western Pennsylvania.

== Ormsby Mine ==
Ormsby Mine Gravity Plane
Overview
- Headquarters: Pittsburgh, PA (Birmingham, Pennsylvania)
- Locale: Pittsburgh, PA
- Dates of operation: 1838–1844–about 1900

Other
- Website: (map)http://images.library.pitt.edu/cgi-bin/i/image/image-idx?view=entry;cc=hopkins;entryid=x-1872p116

The Ormsby mine was an underground coal mine, originally opened in 1838 by the son-in law of Oliver Ormsby, John Harding Page and Captain Phillips. The mine was served by a gravity plane, or incline, built between 1838 and 1844. It was operated by Doctor Oliver Harrison Ormsby, the son of the above named Oliver Ormsby, from 1851 to 1861.

The Keeling Coal Company operated it from 1861 to May 1878. It was then taken over by the Birmingham Coal Company, which had Joseph Keeling as one of its partners. The mine was extensive, eventually connecting to the nearby Bausman Mine, which Keeling also operated.

Coal from this mine was used in early steam engine experiments by the U.S. Navy on the Michigan.

== Coal Road ==
An underground transportation system connecting the Ormsby mine with other local coal mines was begun in 1867. Like many mine railroads in the Pittsburgh area, this was a 3 ft 4 in (1,016 mm) narrow gauge line.

After the coal was removed, it was transported underground from the South Hills to industries along the Monongahela river. The "coal road" passed under three hills, under Mount Oliver, Pennsylvania, then a trestle over a ravine at the present location of Parkwood Road, then under the hill topped by Fort Jones, later St. Joseph's Roman Catholic Church and St. Clair Village, then over another ravine at the present-day Wagner Street, to re-enter an underground mine section in Carrick near where Bruner Street is today. This mine connected with the 3 ft (914 mm) narrow gauge line of the Bausman Mine in Spiketown, now Carrick, and was still operational in 1899. Coal was transferred from Spiketown to the mine entrance on St. Patrick Street by a tail rope system, which was later replaced by a steam locomotive that ran underground. The coal from the mine was transferred to the Birmingham Coal Railroad, a 3 ft 2 in (965 mm) narrow gauge railroad that ran down the middle of South 21st Street from an inclined plane railroad. Although the incline is no longer in existence, its site is occupied by South Side Park, which was also a location of a Sankey brick works. When the enginehouse of the coal road burned shortly before the expiration of Keeling's lease on the mine, the lease was not renewed; At about the same time, the Pittsburgh and Whitehall Railroad obtained an easement adjacent to the track in the center of South 21st St.

== Knoxville Incline ==
In addition to the incline from the Ormsby mine, the Keeling company ran a separate incline for coal, this one with a curve, that in part ran parallel to the lower end of the Mt. Oliver Incline. Later the Knoxville Incline was built parallel to it.
