= Allegheny and South Side Railway =

Defunct railroad that operated in Pennsylvania

Overview
- Headquarters: Pittsburgh, PA
- Reporting mark: AYSS
- Locale: Pennsylvania
- Dates of operation: 1892–1959
- Successor: Pennsylvania Railroad, Pittsburgh & Lake Erie Railroad

Technical
- Track gauge: 4 ft 8 1/2 in (1,435 mm) standard gauge

The Allegheny and South Side Railway (reporting mark AYSS) is an historic railroad that operated in Pennsylvania.

It was incorporated on September 20, 1892, to build from the city of Allegheny to the South Side of Pittsburgh, with a stated distance of 12 miles; A branch of 7 miles from Allegheny to 39th St. in Pittsburgh's Lawrenceville section was also included. As Oliver had at the time recently purchased a portion of the Pittsburg Steel Casting Company at 36th St. and Smallman, and already owned a mill in the Woods Run section of what was then Allegheny, the line was clearly intended to connect all these. The Street Railway Journal described it as a private street railway chartered by Oliver and Roberts Wire, an Oliver Iron and Steel Company predecessor, and a submission to Poor's Manual of the railroads of the United States in 1894 reported completion of trackage between South 4th and South 22nd Sts., Pittsburgh as well as between Woods Run and the Point Bridge in what was then Allegheny. Its initial board of directors was composed of David, Henry, George and James Oliver, Charles Black and Henry Lupton. The officers were David Oliver, President, James Oliver, Vice President, Henry Lupton, Secretary-Auditor, James Oliver, Treasurer and D. S. Kamerer, General Superintendent. It was controlled through stock ownership by the Oliver Iron and Steel Company and for most of its existence had the purpose of performing a terminal switching service in the South Side section of Pittsburgh. (71 I.C.C. 90, 1922) By 1903, John Oliver had become President of the railroad. The railway maintained connections with the Pennsylvania Railroad's Monongahela Branch (technically with the Whitehall Branch, a branch from the Monongahela Branch), and with the main line of the Pittsburgh and Lake Erie Railroad.

== The early years ==
While the original line paralleling the P&LE had been constructed under the guise of Oliver as the Pittsburgh & Whitehall Railroad, that road was subsequently sold to the PRR; Ultimately, only the portion paralleling the P&LE was leased back, to be operated in conjunction with trackage inside Oliver Iron and adjacent factories. The initial locomotive, A&SS 9, was a 0-6-0 constructed by the Pittsburgh Locomotive and Car Works in 1896 on contract number 1605, was later sold to the Pittsburgh, Chartiers & Youghiogheny Railway, where it retained its number. Number 11, also a Pittsburgh-built 0-6-0, arrived in 1898, built under contract 1862.

The trackage in Allegheny was not subsequently reported as part of the Allegheny and South Side, while at the same time the Oliver-founded [Pittsburgh and Western Railroad] had both prior and since included trackage in the area; Given the Lower Works passing from Oliver Iron's hands in 1897 a switching line for the iron company would have had little need for the trackage.

The company entered into agreements with the P&LE in 1904 and with the PRR in 1905 to switch carload freight to industries located between South 3rd St and South 21st Street. Loads came from the P&LE yard at South 10th St and the PRR yard at South 21st St. The company was reimbursed $1 per car by the PRR and the cost of the service performed by the P&LE. Because of the additional traffic, Baldwin 0-6-0T number 4 (contract 34710 of 1910), ALCo (Pittsburgh) 0-4-0T number 5 (contract 39950 of 1906) and 0-6-0T number 6 (contract 42745 of 1907) were delivered.

After the Industrial Railways Case (29 I.C.C. 212) was decided, the contracts were abrogated on April 1, 1914. The company continued to provide switching service over the intervening months, until new contracts subsequent to 32 I.C.C. 129 being decided (on November 2, 1914) were effected on December 9, 1914, with the PRR, and on December 22, 1914, with the P&LE. The contracts were applied retroactively to April 1. Under the new contracts, both trunk line railroads paid the actual cost of switching industries except A&SS owner Oliver Iron. On June 1, 1917, reimbursement of cost, up to 97 cents per car, began being paid for cars delivered to Oliver Iron.

== Between the Wars ==
It was decided in a 1921 Interstate Commerce Commission case 62 I.C.C. 248 Allegheny and S.S. Ry. Co. vs. Director General that the railroad did not meet the requirements of a common carrier, despite serving the unaffiliated Mackintosh-Hemphill Garrison Foundry Co., American Sheet & Tin Plate Co., and Newsome Feed and Grain Co., none of which were directly served by either of the Allegheny and South Side's connections. Not until 277 I.C.C. 119 nearly 30 years later would the commission reverse itself on petition from the Brotherhood of Railroad Trainmen. In spite of this, when Oliver Iron sued the P&LE over needing to bear its own switching costs when certain local competitors did not during the period between the new 1914 contracts being signed and the 1917 beginning of reimbursement of costs for switching cars to Oliver Iron, the I.C.C. awarded Oliver costs for the 30-month period in which none had been paid to the A&SS, in 64 I.C.C. 477.

In 1923, the Schnabel Company, builders of coach bodies, became a tenant in the A&SS building at South 10th and Muriel Streets.

In 1936, the Pennsylvania Railroad delivered 8000 carloads to the A&SS during the first 11 months of the year.

== The Postwar Era ==
In the years after World War 2, the property dieselized with the purchase of a 1944 Whitcomb 65 ton 65DE-19a (ex-US Army) switcher, serial number 60410, from Mississippi Valley Equipment, their number 51, formerly Lancaster and Chester Railway; That unit became A&SS 100. It was soon followed by an EMD SW1 purchased new, with money loaned by the PRR and P&LE and repaid over time according to former officer Kenneth Haberman; That unit, serial number 14058, became A&SS 101. Haberman also reported that 2 EMD employees trained the railroad employees for a month on the SW1. It was painted the same green as A&SS 100. These 2 units replaced the 3 steam locomotives which formerly provided all service.

On March 12, 1952, the PRR, the P&LE and the A&SS drafted a new agreement regarding switching services which would be performed by the A&SS on behalf of the two larger railroads. A letter from P&LE Vice President C.M. Yohe to his counterpart J.A. Appleton at the PRR dated April 24, 1952, notes that this contract has been executed by all concerned parties, supplanting the December, 1914 contracts. This contract named Theodore F. Smith as the president of the A&SS in 1951 and 1952, and James C. Beech as secretary of the A&SS in 1952. Since at least 1929, Smith had been President of Oliver Iron & Steel.

The contract provided that the A&SS would operate switching services for the trunk line railroads at tariff, on tracks between South 3rd and South 21st Streets owned by the PRR as their Whitehall Branch, and on side tracks of the P&LE between those same streets, including intra-mill switching services. The exception was that tariffs would not be paid to the A&SS for switching the mills of its parent, the Oliver Iron and Steel Company. Further, tracks belonging to the Iron and Steel Company between 10th and 11th Streets were required by the contract to be maintained by the P&LE.

The files of the American Short Line Railroad Association show that subsequent to the I.C.C.'s 1950 decision, the Association solicited the A&SS for membership; Some time later, George B. Moser was appointed president, a position which he already held with the P&OV. (He was also trainmaster with the PC&Y at McKees Rocks.)

Advertising by the railroad in February 1959 listed the office at 1101 Muriel Street, Pittsburgh 3, Pa, and the officers as G.B. Moser, President, W.I. Schaffer, Vice President, and K.J. Haberman, Secretary-Treasurer-Controller. At the time they owned 3 freight cars and 2 diesel-electric locomotives.

== Operations in the 1950s ==
Kenneth J. Haberman, initially Chief Clerk, and then Secretary-Treasurer, recounted some details of operations.

- The A&SS operated on all 3 shifts. Heavy car movement occurred at 6:00AM, 10:00AM, and 3:00PM.
- The Pittsburgh Terminal Warehouse was switched at 12:00PM and 5:00PM, with boxcars staged for loading and unloading.
- Any needed special cars were ordered from the PRR, including idler cars for switching the various industrial plants.
- While the A&SS had a 3 stall engine house under the 10th St. Bridge, any serious work was done by the P&LE at their McKees Rocks shops.
- Diesel fuel was provided from a tank buried between 10th and 11th Street, adjacent to the engine house. The fuel was delivered by truck.
- Excess profits during the Korean War years were used to redo all the trackage.
- Installation of a yard for piggyback trailer service was considered in 1953, between 11th and 13th Streets, between the P&LE and the river. The idea languished when the personnel who had been promoting it left the railroad.

== The end ==
The railroad's affairs were entwined in that of its parent company, and an insurance policy was issued to the parent company (beginning with the November 1957 policy, the Oliver Tyrone Corporation) for the facilities of the Iron and Steel company (including remote offices and the Berry Division in Corinth, Mississippi) as well as for the railroad. As a result of the June 1956 sale of the Oliver fastener business to Pittsburgh Screw and Bolt Company, that company first became a tenant in the Oliver facilities, and then pulled out entirely with the opening of their new plant just south of Mt. Pleasant. The last insurance policy on file with the P&LE was dated May 8, 1959, and was issued only to the railroad, as the former Oliver facilities including the railroad had been sold to Carson Industrial Development Corporation.

The railroad dissolved August 1, 1959, and the line became jointly operated by the PRR and the P&LE at that time, according to documents of the P&LE. The files of the American Short Line Railroad Association suggest that a new Buda diesel prime mover had been purchased to remotor the railroad's Whitcomb, but the Whitcomb itself had been resold to the nearby Jones and Laughlin Steel Company plant leaving the orphaned Buda to sell. This exchange happened in December, 1959, at which point Hiram Milton, later with the County Industrial Development Authority and then the Regional Industrial Development Corporation, was listed as representing the A&SS. EMD SW1 101 was sold to the Pittsburgh and Ohio Valley Railway where it continued its service into the 1990s and possibly later as Pittsburgh and Ohio Valley Railway 5. It was part of a group of EMD switchers which replaced 65 ton Whitcomb units like its former sibling at the A&SS. Details provided by Haberman suggest 30 days notice of cancellation were provided by the A&SS, after which the trackage was donated to the P&LE.

== Customers ==
The railroad serviced customers including the following, shown on ICC valuation maps:

- Oliver Iron and Steel Company, its parent. (1001 Muriel St.)
- Allegheny Asphalt & Paving (801 Bingham St.)
- Levinson Steel (a steel products service center) (S. 20th and Wharton Sts.)
- Eichleay Engineering and Construction (33 S. 19th St.)
- Chatfield and Woods (paper products) (S. 17th St. and Merriman Way)
- Edwin Bell (cooperage) (S. 17th St.)
- Mackintosh-Hemphill Garrison Forge (rolls and machinery) (S. 9th and Bingham Sts.)
- Equitable Gas Company (a natural gas utility) (4 S. 9th St.)
- S. Strunz and Son Soap (708 Bingham St.)
- Republic Steel Dilworth-Porter Division (tie plates, until 1950) (S. 4th and Bingham Sts.)
- Follansbee Steel (in the former Dilworth-Porter building) (S. 6th St)
- Truscon Steel (windows) (in the former Dilworth-Porter building) (S. 4th St.)
- Pittsburgh Terminal Warehouse
- U.S. Glass Factory F (formerly Ripley & Co. Glass) (S. 8th and Bingham Sts.)
- Salvation Army (in the former U.S. Glass Factory F) (S. 8th and Bingham Sts.)
- Union Supply (a division of U.S. Steel which typically supplied company stores in ex-Frick Coke territory) (1509 Muriel St.)
