= Pittsburgh, Virginia and Charleston Railway =

Railroad in Pennsylvania, USA

Overview
- Locale: Pittsburgh
- Dates of operation: 1870–1905
- Predecessor: Monongahela Valley Railroad
- Successor: Mon Line

Technical
- Track gauge: 4 ft 8 1/2 in (1,435 mm) standard gauge
- Length: 98.62 miles

The Pittsburgh, Virginia and Charleston Railway was a predecessor of the Pennsylvania Railroad in the U.S. state of Pennsylvania. By 1905, when it was merged into the Pennsylvania, it owned a main line along the left (west) side of the Monongahela River, to Pittsburgh's South Side from West Brownsville. Branches connected to the South-West Pennsylvania Railway in Uniontown via Redstone Creek and to numerous coal mines.

== History ==
The company was chartered by the Pennsylvania General Assembly as the Monongahela Valley Railroad in April 1867, with the right to construct a railroad connecting Pittsburgh to Waynesburg; it was renamed Pittsburgh, Virginia and Charleston Railway in February 1870. By November 1872, when the first segment opened from 4th Street in South Pittsburgh (now South Side Pittsburgh) to Homestead, the Pennsylvania Railroad had gained control. The primary purpose of this acquisition was to allow the Pennsylvania to construct a southern bypass around the congestion of Pittsburgh, via a short connection to the Main Line near Turtle Creek. The line was extended to Monongahela in 1873, and in 1874 the company began operating a steamboat beyond to Brownsville. Trains began running into downtown Pittsburgh's Union Station in 1875, crossing the Monongahela on the Panhandle Bridge. The connection near Turtle Creek was completed in August 1878, with the opening of the Port Perry Branch and Port Perry Bridge. In 1879 the Pennsylvania began operating the PV&C under lease as its Monongahela Division.

The railroad was crossed by the O'Neil and Company Incline in West Elizabeth, Pennsylvania.

The railroad was extended further south along the Monongahela River from Monongahela, Pennsylvania beginning in 1879 and reached West Brownsville in 1881.

The Brownsville Railway Company began constructing a line from near Brownsville to Uniontown, PA. The PV&C took over the Brownsville Railway and merged it on May 11, 1880 and finished the construction of its line by 1882. The Brownsville branch was built in 1883 and connected the PV&C's acquired Brownsville Railway to its namesake town of Brownsville, PA.

The Pittsburgh and Whitehall Rail Road Company constructed a line in South Pittsburgh, PA, in 1886. The line ran from S 3rd Street to a connection with the PV&C near S 30th Street Yard. The line was operated by the PV&C starting in November, 1886, and merged May 14, 1888.

The McKeesport and Bessemer Rail Road Company built a line from the PV&C at Cochran to McKeesport, PA, in 1890–1891. The line was first operated by the PV&C in December 1891, then merged into the PV&C November 1, 1894.

The Monongahela River and Streets Run Rail Road Company acquired what was called the Streets Run branch by the PV&C from Richard Coulter, on January 29, 1892. The PV&C acquired the MR&SR later that year and extended the branch in 1902. The MR&SR was merged into the PV&C November 1, 1894.

The Peters Creek branch, near Peters Creek, PA, was built in 1893–1894. It was extended in 1895, 1901, 1902, and yet again in 1903.

The Keister branch, near Waltersburg, PA, was built in 1899–1900.

The Monongahela and Washington Railroad Company built a railroad from Monongahela to Ellsworth, PA in 1899–1900 and a branch to Cokeburg, PA in 1902. The PV&C merged the line July 1, 1904.

On April 1, 1905, the PV&C was merged into the Pennsylvania Railroad.

Currently (as of 2015), the main line of the PV&C is owned by Norfolk Southern and operates as its Mon Line.
