= Walton's coal incline =

Walton's Coal Incline
Overview
- Headquarters: West Elizabeth, PA
- Locale: West Elizabeth, PA

The Walton's Coal Incline was a nineteenth-century incline, used to transport coal from a mine mouth just west of West Elizabeth, Pennsylvania to a tipple on pool 2 of the Monongahela River. It crossed the entire width of the Borough of West Elizabeth, passing over the Pittsburgh, Virginia and Charleston Railway.

== See also ==
- List of funicular railways
