= Wolftown =

Wolftown may refer to:

- Wolftown, Alabama (List of places in Alabama: S–Z)
- Wolftown, Pennsylvania (List of places in Pennsylvania: W–X)
- Wolftown, Virginia in Madison County
- Wolftown Committee, musical collaboration of recording artists
- Wolftown Community, a Cherokee community in the area of Cherokee, North Carolina
- Nickname for Wolverhampton
- Wolftown, community in Ontario, Canada in the Admaston/Bromley township
- Wolftown, former name of DeLisle, Mississippi
