= Wilgus =

Wilgus may refer to:

- William J. Wilgus (1865–1949), an American civil engineer
- D. K. Wilgus (1918–1989), an American folksong scholar
- Wilgus, Pennsylvania, an unincorporated community
- Wilgus Site, a prehistoric Native American camp site in Delaware
- Wilgus State Park, a park in Ascutney, Vermont
