= South Side Park (disambiguation) =

South Side Park was the name used for three different baseball parks that formerly stood in Chicago, Illinois.

South Side Park may also refer to:

- South Side Park (Pittsburgh), an urban park in Pittsburgh, Pennsylvania
- South Side Park (Winston-Salem), a demolished baseball park in Winston-Salem, North Carolina
