= Port Perry Tunnel =

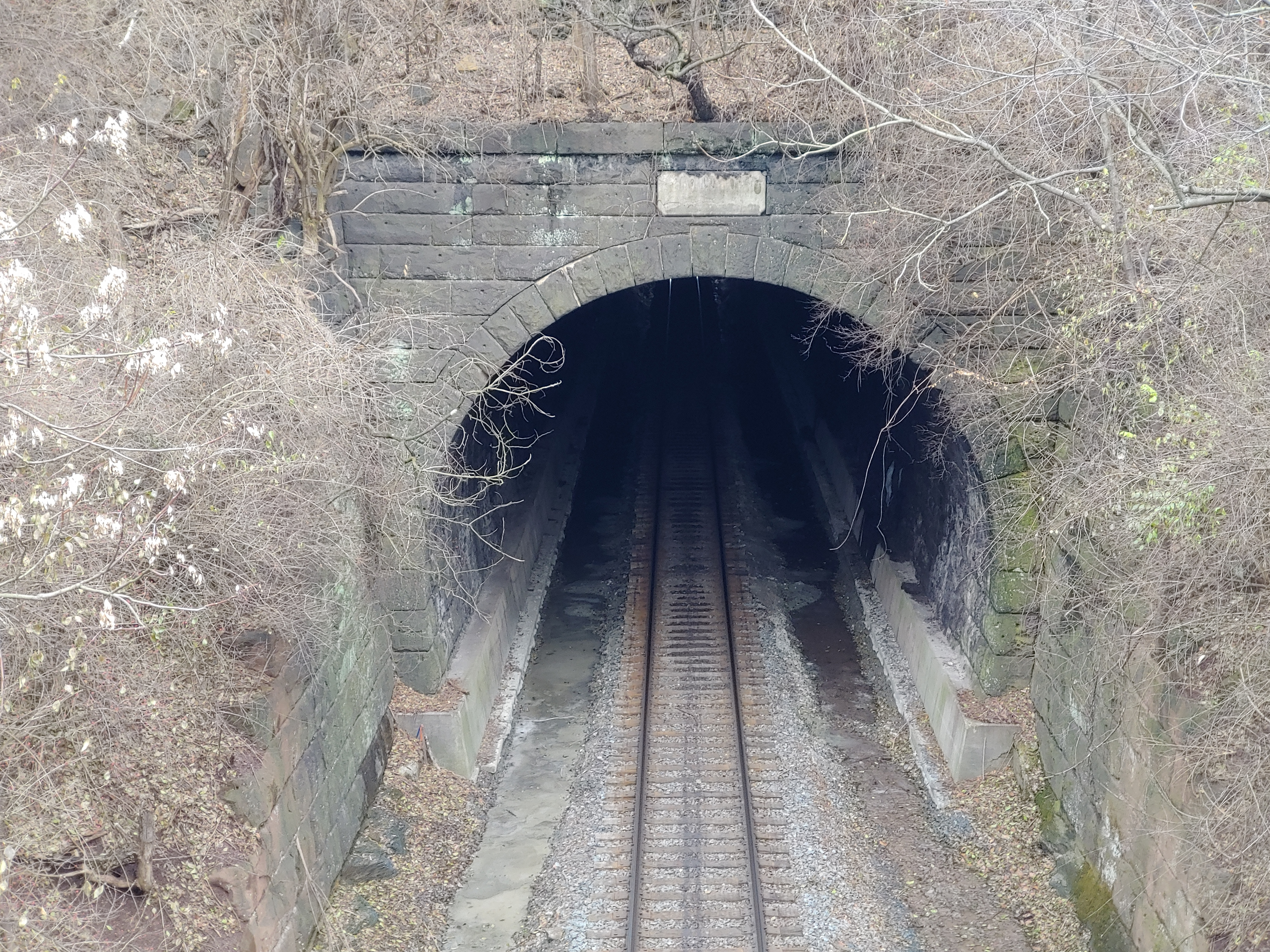
- The tunnel's south portal.
- Interactive map of Port Perry Tunnel

Overview
- Line: Port Perry Branch
- Coordinates: 40.39°N 79.848°W

Technical
- Length: 514 ft
- No. of tracks: 1
- Track gauge: 1,435 mm (4 ft 8 1/2 in)

Port Perry Tunnel is a railroad tunnel on the Port Perry Branch in Pennsylvania.

== History ==
The tunnel was built in 1877 as part of the Port Perry Branch connector between the Main Line and Monongahela Division of the Pennsylvania Railroad. The tunnel (which currently has only one track) was once double-tracked.

== See also ==
- PRR Port Perry Bridge
