= Port Perry, Pennsylvania =

- Abandoned town
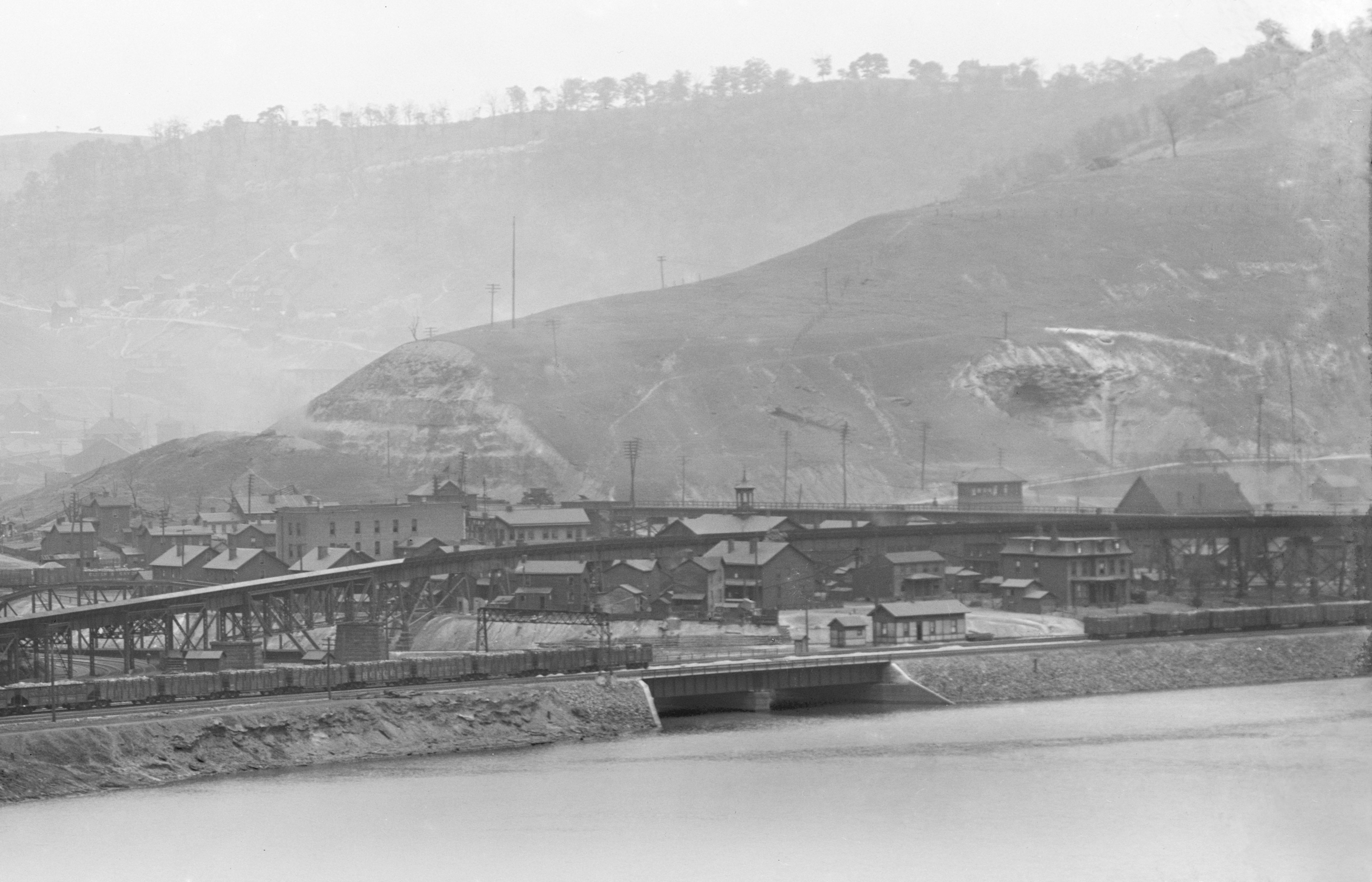
- Port Perry from across the Monongahela River, between 1900 and 1915
- Coordinates: 40°23′27″N 79°50′58″W
- Country: United States
- State: Pennsylvania
- County: Allegheny
- Township: North Versailles
- Founded: 1790s
- Founder: John Perry
- Elevation: 774 ft (236 m)
- GNIS feature ID: 1204437

Port Perry was a town along the Monongahela River near Braddock, Pennsylvania, and by the mouth of Turtle Creek. It disappeared by 1945, having been gradually replaced by railroad tracks serving the nearby Edgar Thomson Steel Works.

== History ==
The town was laid out in the 1790s by its founder, John Perry. On June 1, 1795, Perry advertised his "new town", citing its proximity to roads, mills and quarries, and claiming its harbor was "the best on the western waters."

Zadok Cramer's The Navigator (1802) referred to the settlement as Perrystown. A later edition of the Navigator stated that the town by the mouth of Turtle Creek had "not progressed". Only eight families reportedly resided there in 1840.

It was not until some fifty years after its founding that Port Perry began to develop in earnest. The original Monongahela Lock and Dam No. 2 was built beside it and opened in 1841. The town was resurveyed and replatted by Col. William L. Miller, who lived on the adjacent hill. Miller opened a boat supply store that also functioned as a kind of post office before the establishment of an official post office in 1850. The Pittsburgh and Connellsville Railroad laid the first railroad tracks through the town in 1857; the line reached Pittsburgh in 1861. In the 1860s, Col. Miller's son, George T. Miller, operated a boatyard that built about half the coal boats on the river and a sawmill that produced about two million gun stocks for the Civil War.

Even in its heyday, Port Perry was not its own municipality. It remained under the jurisdiction of Versailles Township until 1869 and North Versailles Township afterward.

The construction of the Edgar Thomson Steel Works on the opposite side of Turtle Creek in the 1870s doomed Port Perry. As railroad operations at the works expanded over the decades, properties in the town were bought up and razed to make room for tracks and yards. Hastening the community's decline were the depletion of nearby coal mines in the late 19th century and the moving of the locks and dam downriver to Braddock in the early 20th century. The Pittsburgh Gazette observed in 1904 that Port Perry was "passing away".

Despite a terminally declining population, Port Perry remained a site of major rail and river traffic flows. In 1914, articles in the trade journals Railway Review and Steel and Iron claimed, on the basis of statistics compiled by the Pittsburgh Industrial Development Commission, that more annual tonnage of freight passed Port Perry than any other point in the world. Four railroads ran through the town: the Pittsburgh, McKeesport and Youghiogheny Railroad (operated by the Pittsburgh and Lake Erie Railroad), the Baltimore and Ohio Railroad (which had absorbed the Pittsburgh & Connellsville line), the Union Railroad, and the Port Perry Branch of the Pennsylvania Railroad.

Growth of the steel mill and the proliferation of railroad tracks continued to crowd out and isolate the town. After a 1923 expansion of the mill, Port Perry was almost completely cut off from other communities. Its last house was demolished in 1944.

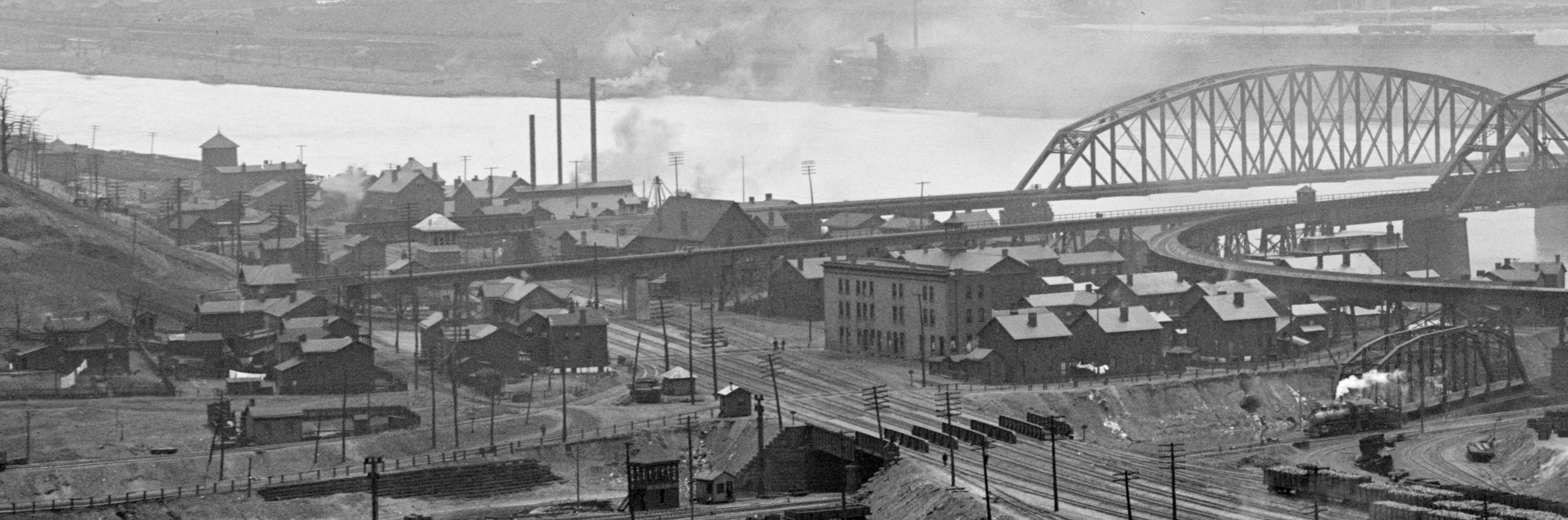
Port Perry circa 1908

== See also ==
- List of ghost towns in Pennsylvania
- Port Perry Branch
- Port Perry Tunnel
- PRR Port Perry Bridge
- Union Railroad Port Perry Bridge
