= Ohio Connecting Railroad Bridge =

Ohio Connecting Bridge
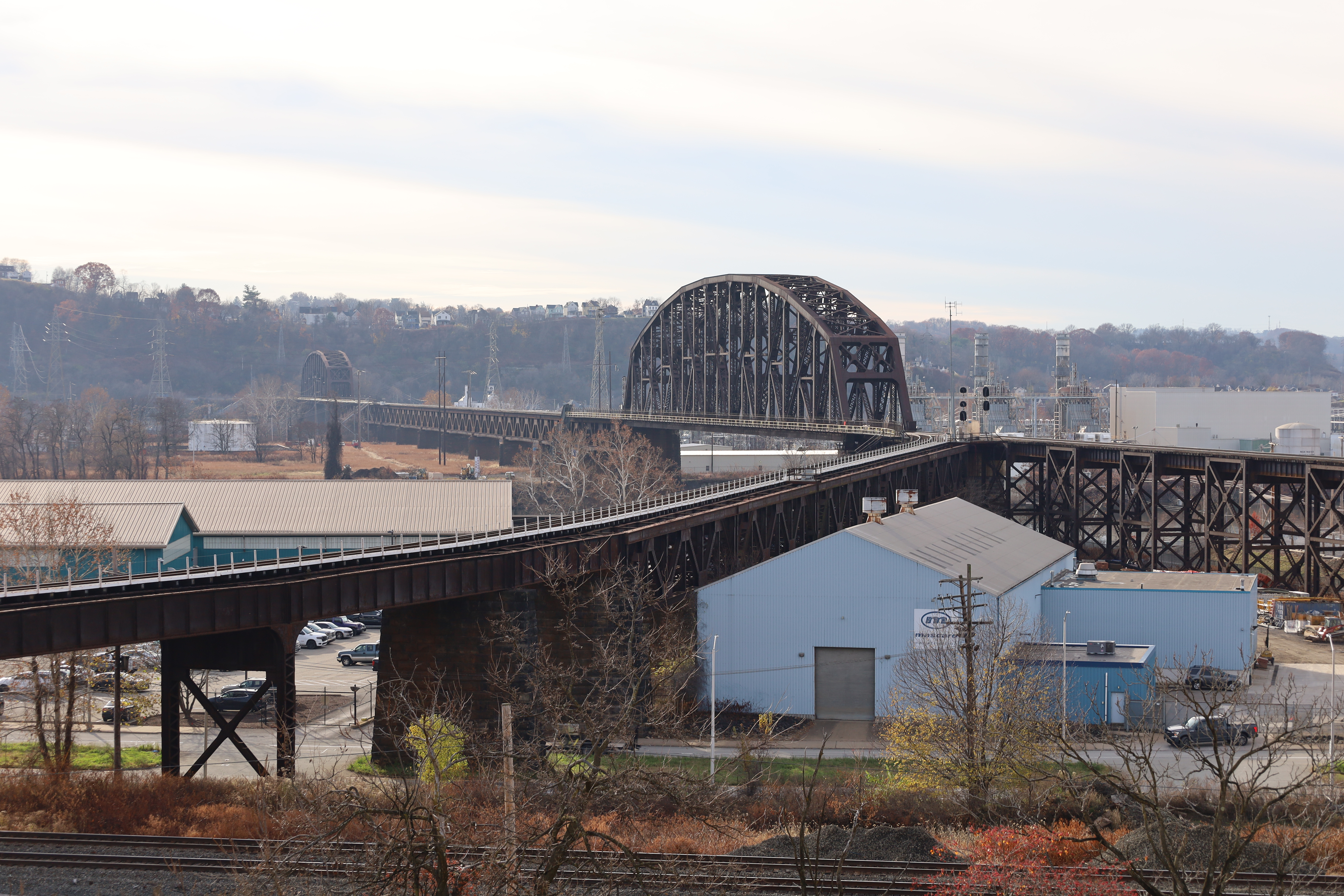
- The bridge in 2025
- Coordinates: 40.4628°N 80.0429°W
- Carries: 2 rail lines
- Crosses: Ohio River
- Locale: Pittsburgh, Pennsylvania

Characteristics
- Design: Steel truss bridge
- Longest span: 508 feet (155 m)
- Clearance below: 68 feet (21 m)

History
- Opened: 1915; 110 years ago

Location
- Interactive map of Ohio Connecting Bridge

The Ohio Connecting Railroad Bridge is a steel bridge which crosses the Ohio River at Brunot's Island at the west end of Pittsburgh, Pennsylvania, United States. It consists of two major through truss spans over the main and back channels of the river, of 508 feet (155 m) and 406 feet (124 m) respectively, with deck truss approaches.

== History ==
=== Original bridge ===
The original Ohio Connecting Bridge was built in 1890 by the Ohio Connecting Railway. It was a single-track bridge. It was built as a freight bypass so the freight trains of the Pennsylvania Railroad could bypass the congested passenger station in downtown Pittsburgh, Pennsylvania. Traffic could move in either direction between the Pennsylvania Railroad main line in Pitcairn, Pennsylvania (part of the Pittsburgh Division at that location) and the Fort Wayne Line at the north end of the Ohio Connecting Bridge. Trains would traverse the Port Perry Branch, Monongahela Division, and Panhandle Division in order to reach the Pittsburgh Division or the Fort Wayne Line.

Construction of the northern approach to the bridge required the demolition of the original Pittsburgh U.S. Marine Hospital.

=== Current bridge ===
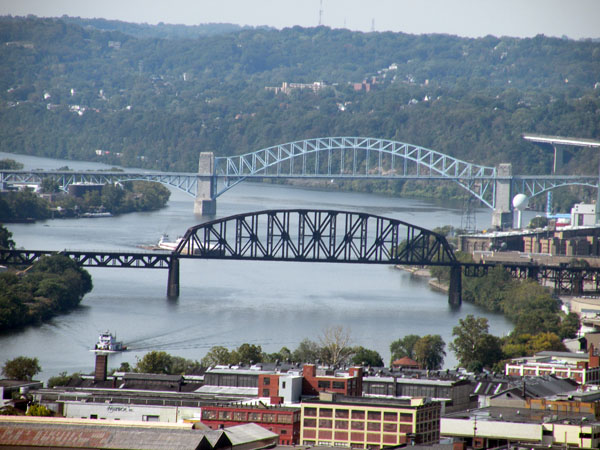
Northern span of the bridge (with the McKees Rocks Bridge in the background) in 2010

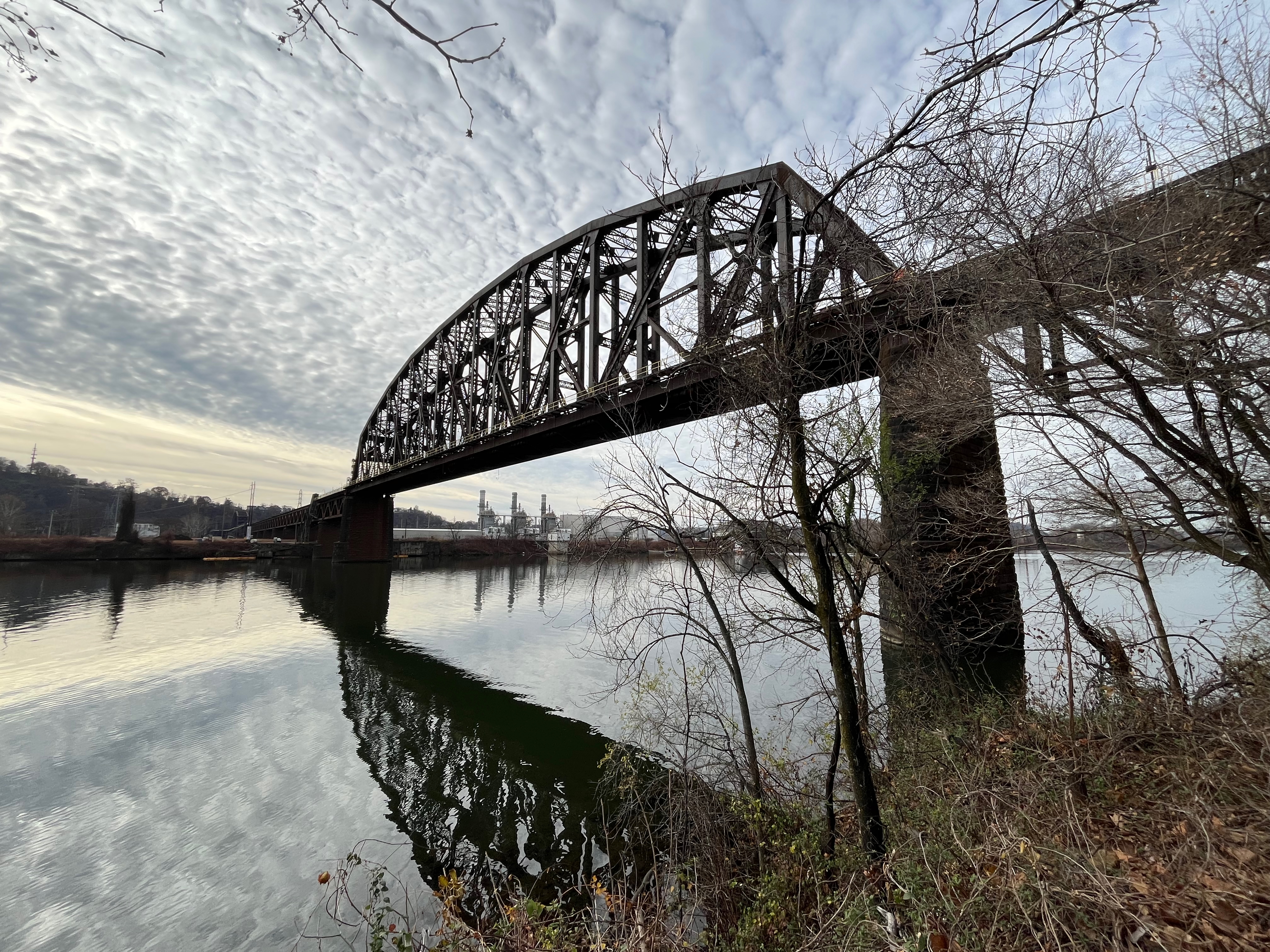
Northern span in 2025

By 1915 the original bridge was not large enough to handle the increasing freight traffic, so a new bridge was built with two tracks. The new bridge was built around the old bridge while the old bridge was still in service. The new bridge also had a siding and car elevator in the center so coal could be delivered to the coal-fired power plant on the island.

This 1915 bridge is still in service.

The north end of the bridge has a wye so trains can be directed west or east. If a train is directed east it must pass next to Island Avenue Yard on the Isle Connector to get to the mainline.

Trains at the south end of the bridge could be directed east onto the Monongahela Division or south/southwest onto the Panhandle Division, Scully Yard, or onto the Chartiers Branch.

In 1968 the Pennsylvania Railroad merged with the New York Central to form Penn Central. Penn Central became a part of Conrail in 1976. In 1999, CSX and Norfolk Southern Railway (NS) bought Conrail, with NS getting 58% and CSX getting 42%. The Ohio Connecting Bridge was acquired by NS.

== The present ==
NS continues to use the bridge as part of the route trains with double-stack containers use. This practice was started by Conrail in 1995. It now connects the Mon Line, and the P&OC RR with the Fort Wayne Line and Main Line. The entire Panhandle Division/Weirton Secondary was abandoned in 1996, but the interchange with the former line remains active to interchange cars with the Pittsburgh and Ohio Central Railroad. Many coal trains coming out of the Monongahela Valley also use this bridge. Sometimes mixed freight and other types of trains use the bridge. No scheduled passenger trains use the bridge.

== See also ==
- List of bridges documented by the Historic American Engineering Record in Pennsylvania
- List of crossings of the Ohio River
