= Port Perry Branch =

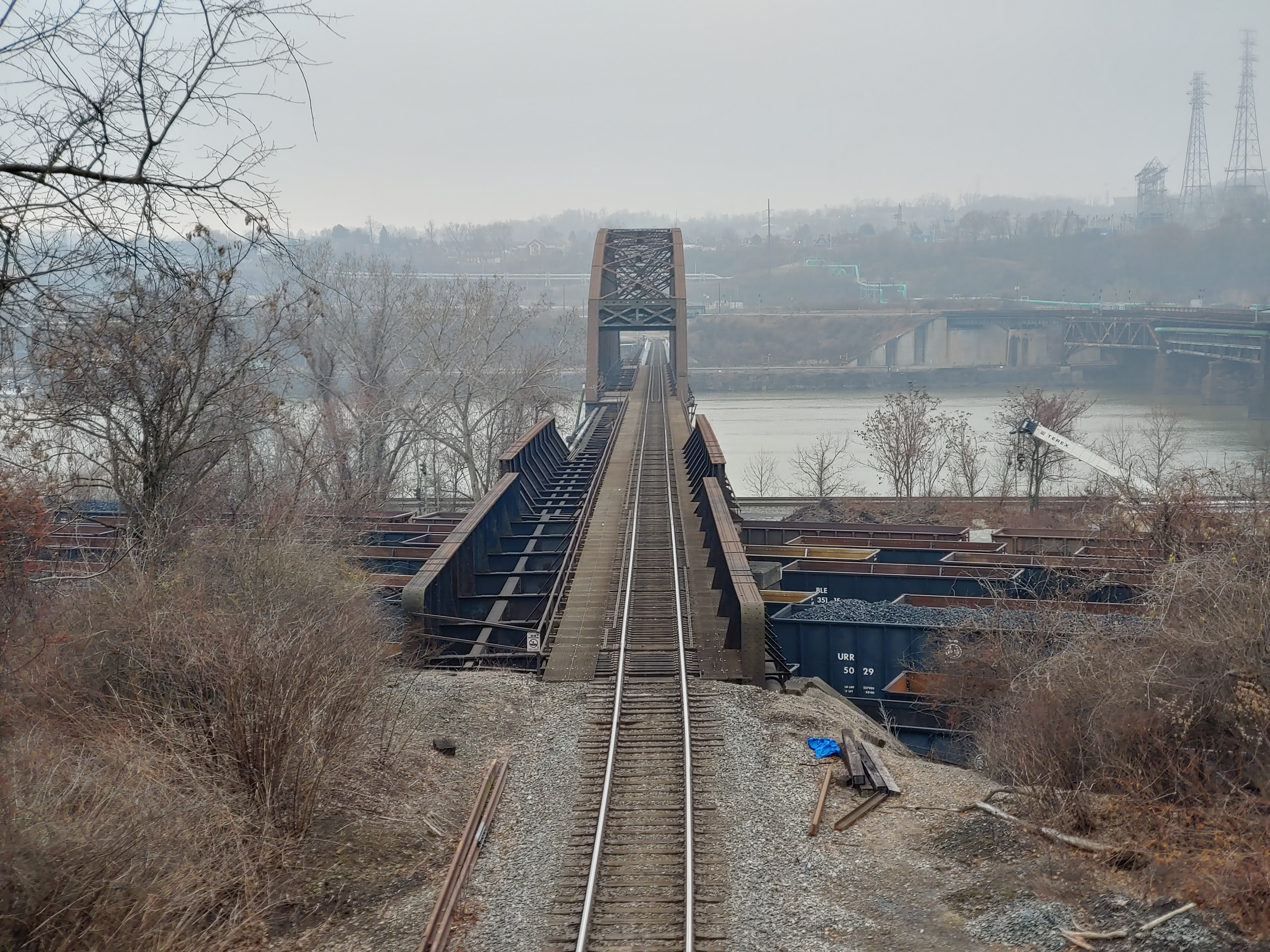
- The Port Perry Branch going over the Monongahela River on the PRR Port Perry Bridge.

Overview
- Termini: N. Versailles; Duquesne

History
- Opened: 1877 (Pennsy), 1968 (Penn Central), 1976 (Conrail), 1999 (NS)
- Closed: 1968 (Pennsy), 1976 (Penn Central), 1999 (Conrail)

Technical
- Track gauge: 1,435 mm (4 ft 8 1/2 in) standard gauge

The Port Perry Branch is a rail line owned and operated by the Norfolk Southern Railway in the U.S. state of Pennsylvania. The line runs from the Pittsburgh Line in North Versailles Township southwest through the Port Perry Tunnel and across the Monongahela River on the PRR Port Perry Bridge to the Mon Line in Duquesne along a former Pennsylvania Railroad line.

== History ==
The Main Line of the Pennsylvania Railroad (PRR) was originally constructed with the goal of providing a rail link from the Eastern Seaboard to the waters of the Ohio River at Pittsburgh. By the 1870s, however, Pittsburgh was not just an endpoint; it had become a gateway through which all the PRR's lines to the Midwest passed. With the tracks in the city becoming increasingly more crowded, the PRR sought to bypass some of its traffic around the city. Moreover, all the traffic bound for the Panhandle Route needed to pass through the Grant's Hill Tunnel in downtown Pittsburgh, limiting and slowing traffic through the city.

Therefore, in 1871, the PRR planned a connection – later to be known as the Port Perry Branch – between its Main Line and the main line of a subsidiary, the Pittsburgh, Virginia and Charleston Railway (PV&C, today's Mon Line). This connection would contain new trackage, a tunnel and a bridge. Together, this would provide a bypass via which traffic from the Main Line (today's Pittsburgh Line) bound for the Panhandle Route, and vice versa, could skip the heavy congestion in the city and avoid Grant's Hill Tunnel.

In 1877, the branch was complete between Brinton's Station on the Main Line and Port Perry on the north bank of the Monongahela River. The river bridge between Port Perry and the PV&C opened the following year, completing the alternate route around the congestion of the Main Line and the passenger station complex in Pittsburgh.

For some time, there was also a link from the Port Perry Branch to the main line heading westwards. This consisted of a curved bridge over Turtle Creek at Brinton, and was known as the Brinton "U".

The PRR leased the PV&C in 1879 as part of its Monongahela Division. The branch passed to Penn Central Transportation in 1968, Conrail in 1976, and was assigned to Norfolk Southern in 1999.

In the 1990s, Conrail began to use the Port Perry Branch, together with the Mon Line to Pittsburgh (including the former PV&C main line, a small portion of the Panhandle Route, and the Ohio Connecting Railroad Bridge) as a double-stack high clearance route. It continues to be used as such (as of 2019).

== See also ==
- Brilliant Branch, a similar cutoff across the Allegheny River
- Ohio Connecting Railroad Bridge, part of the former Ohio Connecting Railway, another bypass the PRR built across the Ohio River.
- Mon Line
- PRR Port Perry Bridge
