= Braddock Locks & Dam =

Dam in Pennsylvania and West Virginia, US

Braddock Locks and Dam
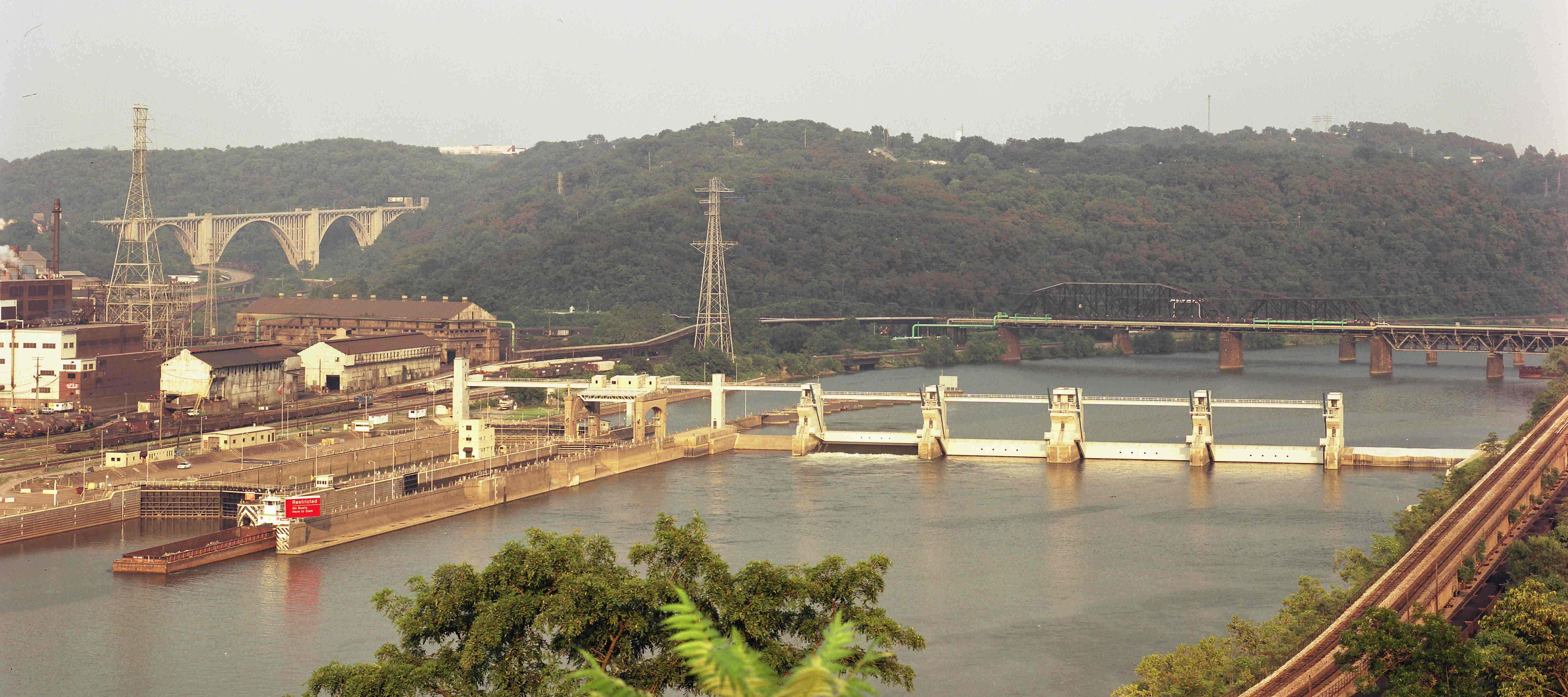
- Interactive map of Braddock Locks and Dam
- Location: Braddock, Pennsylvania, and West Mifflin, Pennsylvania
- Coordinates: 40°23′27″N 79°51′28″W
- Construction began: 1902
- Opening date: 1906
- Operator: U.S. Army Corps of Engineers, Pittsburgh District

Dam and spillways
- Impounds: Monongahela River

Braddock Locks & Dam (previously named Monongahela Locks and Dam No. 2) is one of nine navigational structures on the Monongahela River between Pittsburgh, Pennsylvania, and Fairmont, West Virginia. Built and maintained by the U.S. Army Corps of Engineers, the gated dam and the lock form an upstream pool that is for 12.6 miles (20.3 km), stretching to Elizabeth, Pennsylvania.

== Description ==
Braddock Locks and Dam consists of the locks located on the right bank and the newly gated dam, that replaced the nearly 100-year-old fixed-crest dam. The older structure in turn had replaced a lock and dam facility opened in 1841 at Port Perry, slightly upriver from Braddock.

=== Locks ===
Built in 1953, the locks consist of two side-by-side chambers. The land chamber is 110 feet (34 m) wide by 720 feet (220 m) long and the river chamber is 56 feet (17 m) wide by 360 feet (110 m) long.

=== Dam ===
Construction of new Braddock Dam, started in 1999, was completed in May 2004 using innovative in-the-wet construction techniques. Two prefabricated hollow concrete segments were constructed at an off-site dry-dock and floated into place and set down on a prefabricated foundation system of sheet-pile cut-off walls and large diameter drilled shafts socketed into bedrock. The float-in segments were built with precast wall panels and cast-in-place bottom and top slabs. Weight of the first 333-foot (101 m) by 104-foot (32 m) segment was 11,600 short tons (10,500 tonnes). Dam segment two, at 9,000 short tons (8,200 tonnes), measures 265 feet (81 m) by 104 feet (32 m).

The 517-foot-wide (158 m) spillway was equipped with three 110-foot-wide (34 m) by 21-foot-high (6.4 m) Standard Tainter gates and one 110-foot-wide (34 m) by 11-foot-high (3.4 m) Water Quality Tainter gate. Each gate is operated by two hydraulic cylinders. All gates were fabricated and assembled in one piece by G&G in Alabama and were barge shipped to the project site. Weight of the Standard Gate and the Water Quality Gate is 219 short tons (199 tonnes) and 143 short tons (130 tonnes), respectively.

The construction cost of the new dam was approximately $107.4 million.

== See also ==
- List of crossings of the Monongahela River

== Bibliography ==
- Dams of the United States - A Pictorial Display of Landmark Dams. Denver, Colorado: USSD. 2003. ISBN 978-1-884575-61-7.
- Boyer, Douglas D.; Wiltshire, Richard L.; Tarbox, Glenn S. (2013). Achievements and Advancements in U.S. Dam Engineering. Denver, Colorado: USSD. ISBN 978-1-884575-64-8.
- Salamon, J.; Sehgal, C.; Karaffa, W. (2006). "Large Width to Height Ration Tainter Gates at Braddock Lock and Dam". Waterpower.
