= Witinski Villa, Pennsylvania =

Coordinates: 41°10′48″N 75°56′52″W

Witinski Villa is a community in Hanover Township in Luzerne County, Pennsylvania. In 2012, roads were torn up in Witinski Villa and nearby Truesdale Terrace to install a $2 million sewage collection system to serve 60 homes.
