= West Lenox, Pennsylvania =

Unincorporated community in Pennsylvania, US

West Lenox
- Unincorporated community
- Location within the state of Pennsylvania West Lenox (the United States)
- Coordinates: 41°43′14″N 75°41′57″W
- Country: United States
- State: Pennsylvania
- County: Susquehanna
- Township: Lenox Township
- Elevation: 1,220 ft (370 m)
- Time zone: UTC-5 (Eastern (EST))
  - Summer (DST): UTC-4 (EDT)
- GNIS feature ID: 1191059

West Lenox is an unincorporated community located in Lenox Township, Susquehanna County, Pennsylvania, United States.
