= Birmingham Coal Company =

Birmingham Coal Company Railroad
Overview
- Locale: Allegheny County, Pennsylvania

Technical
- Track gauge: 3 ft 2 in (965 mm)

Other
- Website: Map https://web.archive.org/web/20110927045243/http://images.library.pitt.edu/cgi-bin/i/image/image-idx?view=entry%3Bcc%3Dhopkins%3Bentryid%3Dx-20090330-hopkins-0026

The Birmingham Coal Company was a coal mining company in the Pittsburgh Coalfield area. It operated mines along Becks Run, as well as other mines south of the Monongahela River, such as the Bausman Mine and the American Mine. It is named for Birmingham, Pennsylvania, a town which was later annexed to Pittsburgh. Part of the company was the Birmingham Coal Company Railroad, a 3 ft 2 in (965 mm) narrow gauge railroad that ran Along 21st street. Coal was transferred underground using a tailrope system from Spiketown to the mine entrance, and from there to the railroad on a gravity plane to the railroad.
