= Westmoreland City, Pennsylvania =

Unincorporated community in Pennsylvania, US

Westmoreland City
- Unincorporated community
- Location within the state of Pennsylvania Westmoreland City (the United States)
- Coordinates: 40°19′52″N 79°40′37″W
- Country: United States
- State: Pennsylvania
- County: Westmoreland
- Township: North Huntingdon Township
- Elevation: 984 ft (300 m)
- Time zone: UTC-5 (Eastern (EST))
  - Summer (DST): UTC-4 (EDT)
- ZIP codes: 15692
- GNIS feature ID: 1191174

Westmoreland City is an unincorporated community located within North Huntingdon Township, Westmoreland County, Pennsylvania, United States.
