= Wintersville, Pennsylvania =

Unincorporated community in Pennsylvania, U.S.

- Unincorporated community
- Interactive map of Wintersville, Pennsylvania
- Coordinates: 40°25′29.33″N 76°15′53.83″W
- Country: United States
- State: Pennsylvania
- County: Berks
- Township: Earl
- Elevation: 564 ft (172 m)
- Time zone: UTC−5 (Eastern (EST))
  - Summer (DST): UTC−4 (EDT)
- GNIS feature ID: 1204977

Wintersville is an unincorporated community in Tulpehocken Township, Berks County, Pennsylvania, United States. It is located on Wintersville Road near Mount Aetna, with which it shares the ZIP Code of 19544.
