= Oliver Iron and Steel Corporation =

Manufacturer of iron and steel hardware

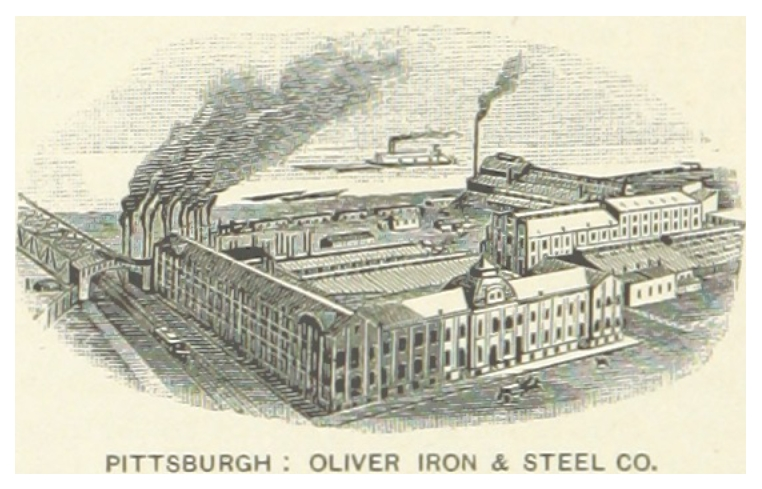
- Industry: Manufacturer of iron and steel hardware
- Predecessor: Oliver Brothers merged with the Phillips Iron Works to form Oliver Brothers and Phillips
- Founded: Renamed Oliver Iron and Steel Corporation in 1922
- Headquarters: Pittsburgh, Pennsylvania, United States

The Oliver Iron and Steel Corporation was a manufacturer of iron and steel hardware including nuts, bolts, screws, and horseshoes in Pittsburgh, Pennsylvania.

== History ==
The company was originally Oliver Brothers and Phillips after the Oliver Brothers concern merged with the Phillips Iron Works, later Oliver Iron and Steel Company before becoming Oliver Iron and Steel Corporation in 1922. In its early times Henry W. Oliver was president of the company. The company controlled the Allegheny and South Side Railway by stock ownership.

Until 1897, the Lower Works at Woods Run in the city of Allegheny (now Pittsburgh's North Side) included rolling mills. In that year, the Schoen Pressed Steel Company bought the Lower Works. The Upper Works, in the South Side, made hardware from iron and steel.

In 1923, the Pittsburgh city council approved city ordinance no. 205, granting the company, "its successors and assigns, the right to construct, maintain and use an overhead skip hoist across south Twelfth street with an approximate clearance of 14' for the purpose of conveying iron and steel products from the building of said corporation situated on the east side of South Twelfth street to another building situated on the west side of South Twelfth street, Seventeenth ward, Pittsburgh, Pa."

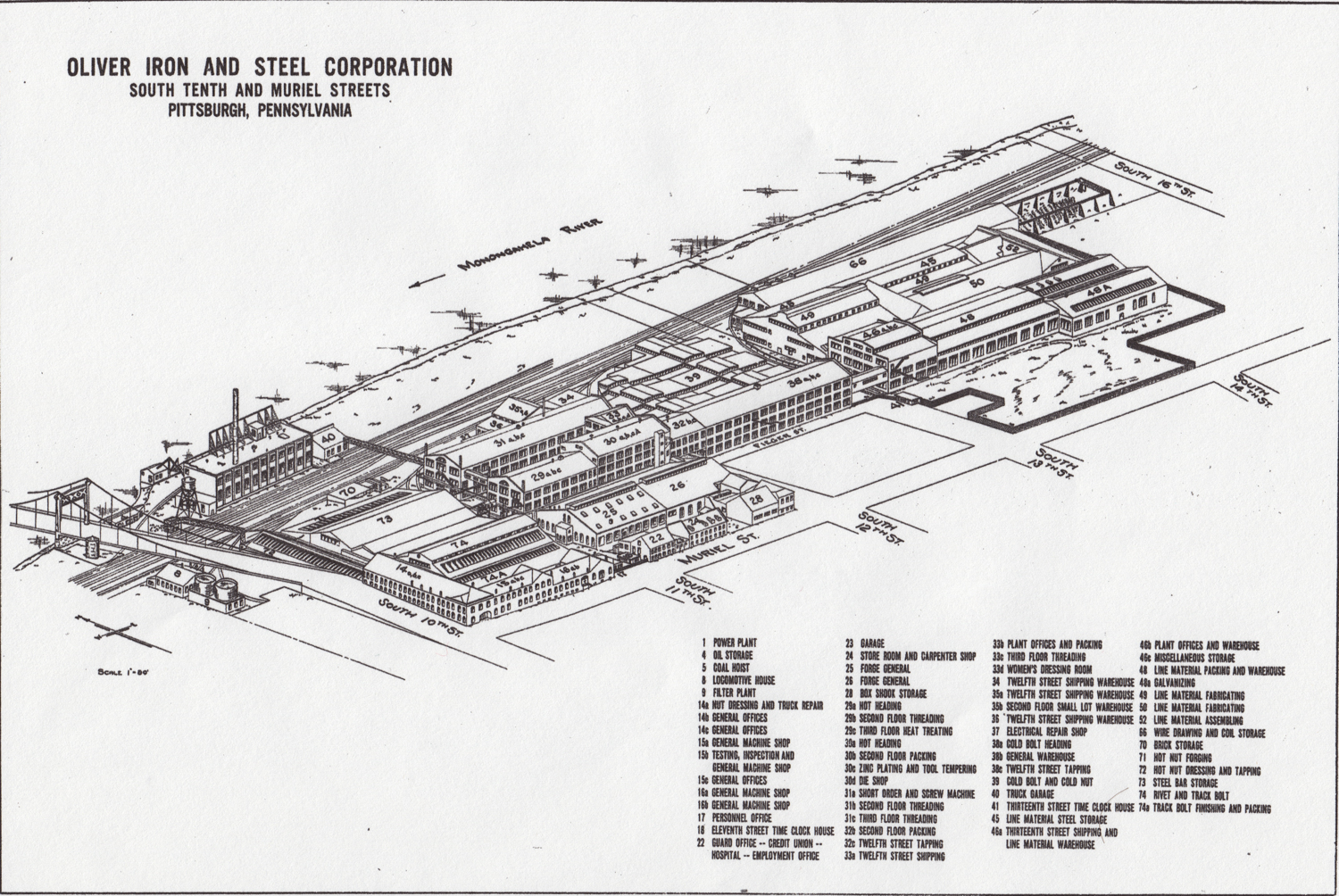
Oliver Iron and Steel plant map, from 1948 employee tour

Around 1951, the Berry Motors Company of Corinth, Mississippi was acquired and made the Berry Division of Oliver Iron and Steel.

In late September 1954 the company suffered a work stoppage. Contemporary newspaper accounts mentioned threats of plant closure at the time unless the strike ended.

During 1955 longtime president Theodore F. Smith moved on to the Kaiser Engineers division of the Henry J. Kaiser Company, and Paul H. Starzman was elected the new president.

The Berry Division was subject to an antitrust lawsuit filed on June 11, 1956 At about the same time, the fastener business was sold to Pittsburgh Screw and Bolt Company, and the pole line hardware business was merged into the Oliver Electric Company of Battle Creek, Michigan. The company had lost money each of the previous 4 years.

Oliver Iron and Steel merged into the Oliver Tyrone Corporation effective December 31, 1956.

As a new plant for Pittsburgh Screw and Bolt Company was started outside Mount Pleasant, Westmoreland County in 1957 the former Oliver Iron and Steel facilities in the Pittsburgh South Side were soon empty. The facilities and land, as well as the Allegheny and South Side Railway, were sold to Carson Industrial Development Corporation, who planned an industrial and warehousing park on the land. Pittsburgh City Planning Department aerial photos from 1962 show the land cleared to dirt.
