= Sankey brick =

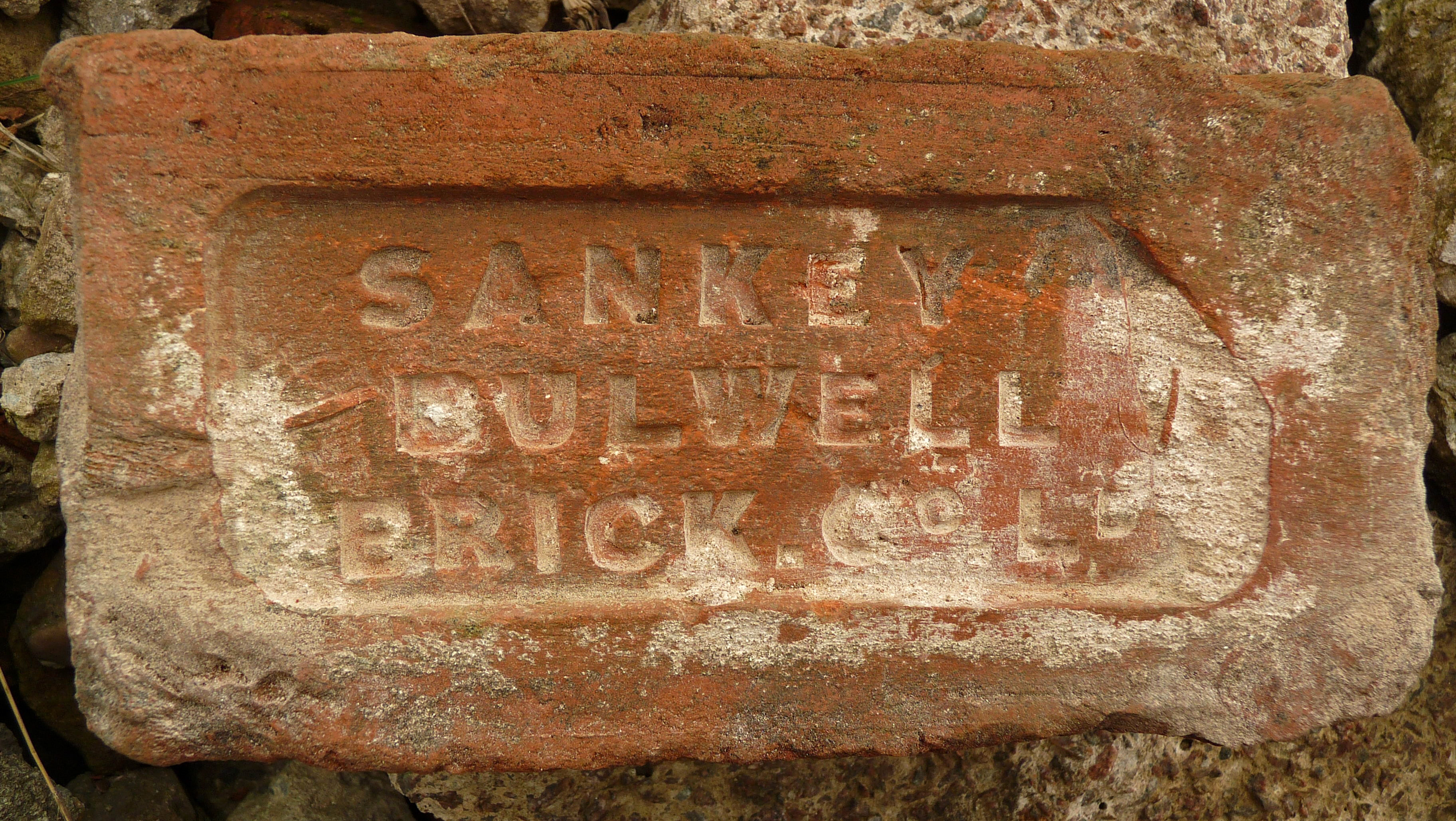
A brick from the Sankey Bulwell Brick Company. Photo taken in Pinxton, England.

The Sankey brick was the preferred construction material of the South Side Flats in Pittsburgh. It was the original product of the Sankey Brick Company, founded in 1861 by William, John, and Thomas Sankey.

== History ==
The original brick works stood at the end of a railroad at 21st Street, and now forms part of the present South Side Park.

The Sankey Brothers were pioneers in the automated production of brick, using local shale instead of clay as the basis of the brick. The company had an office at 2112 Carson Street, and additional plants at 37th and Liberty in Lawrenceville and at Penn and Atlantic in the East End of Pittsburgh.
