= Wilgus, Pennsylvania =

Unincorporated community in Pennsylvania, U.S.

Coordinates: 40°47′02″N 78°53′08″W

Wilgus is an unincorporated community in Indiana County, in the U.S. state of Pennsylvania.

== History ==
The community was named after one Mr. Wilgus, a businessperson in the local coal-mining industry.
