= South Side Park (Pittsburgh) =

Urban park in Pittsburgh, Pennsylvania

Coordinates: 40.421°N 79.977°W

- Interactive map of South Side Park
- Type: Municipal Park
- Location: Pittsburgh, Pennsylvania
- Area: 65 acres (260,000 m^{2})
- Operator: Pittsburgh Department of Parks & Recreation

South Side Park is an urban park in Pittsburgh. It is situated in a ravine that divides the South Side Slopes neighborhood, and extends to the location of the former Oliver Ormsby estate in Mount Oliver, Pennsylvania, Ormsby Manor. The trails near and at the top of the park offer expansive views of Pittsburgh. From west to east one can see the downtown skyscrapers, apartment buildings, hospitals, university buildings, and more. You can also get an excellent view of blue Birmingham bridge, much of the South Side Flats, and a wide section of the 376 highway.

== History ==
The park occupies land formerly used by the St. Clair Incline, and the former site of a Sankey brick works.

== Plant Species ==
Invasive Species: 1. Vitis 2. Reynoutria japonica (syn. Fallopia japonica) 3. Alliaria petiolata 4. Lonicera japonica 5. Menispermum canadense 6. Catalpa speciosa 7. Cirsium arvense 8. Celastrus orbiculatus
