= Henry W. Oliver =

American businessman (1840–1904)

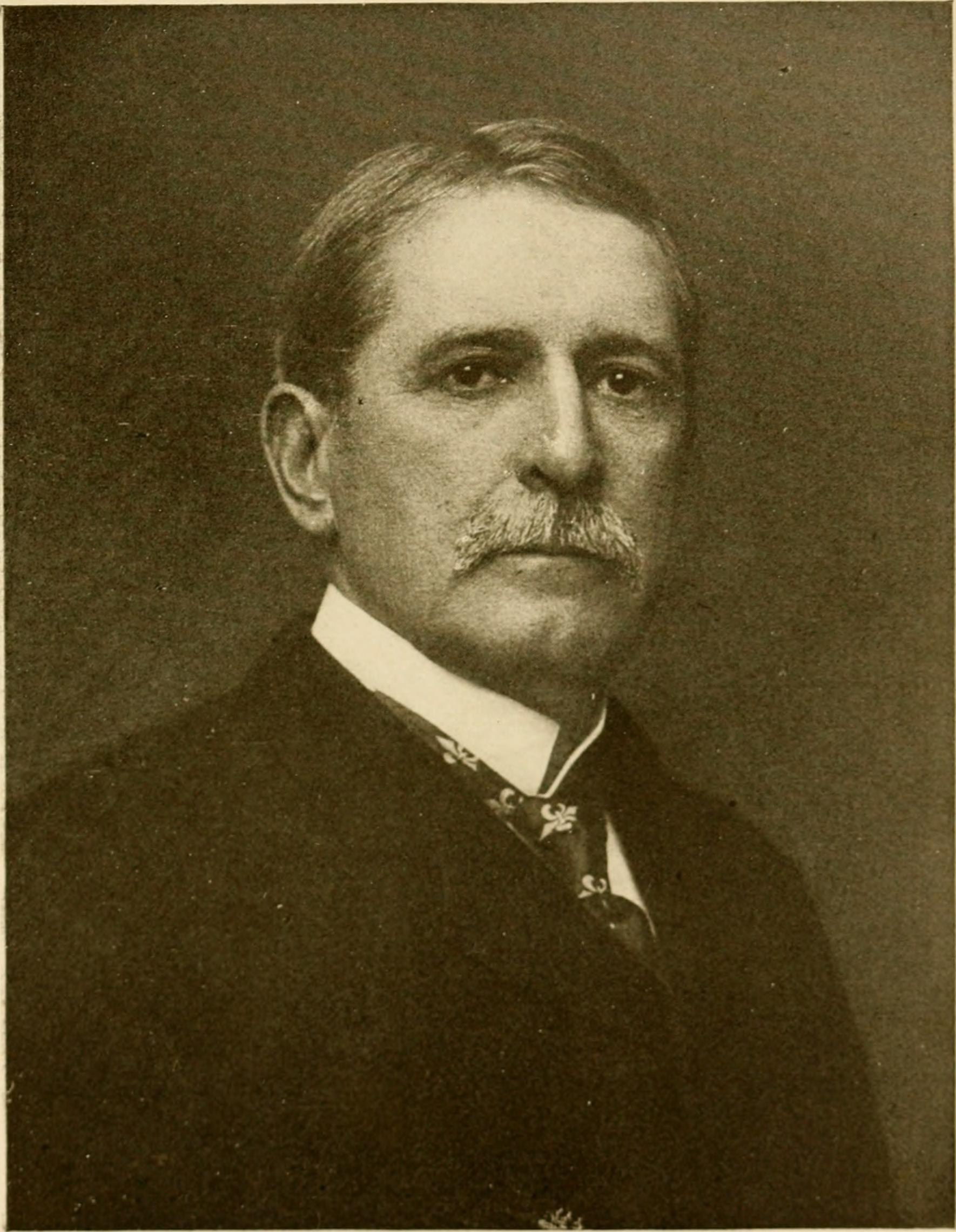
- Born: February 25, 1840; Dungannon, Ireland
- Died: February 8, 1904 (aged 63)
- Resting place: Allegheny Cemetery
- Political party: Republican
- Spouse: Edith Cassidy

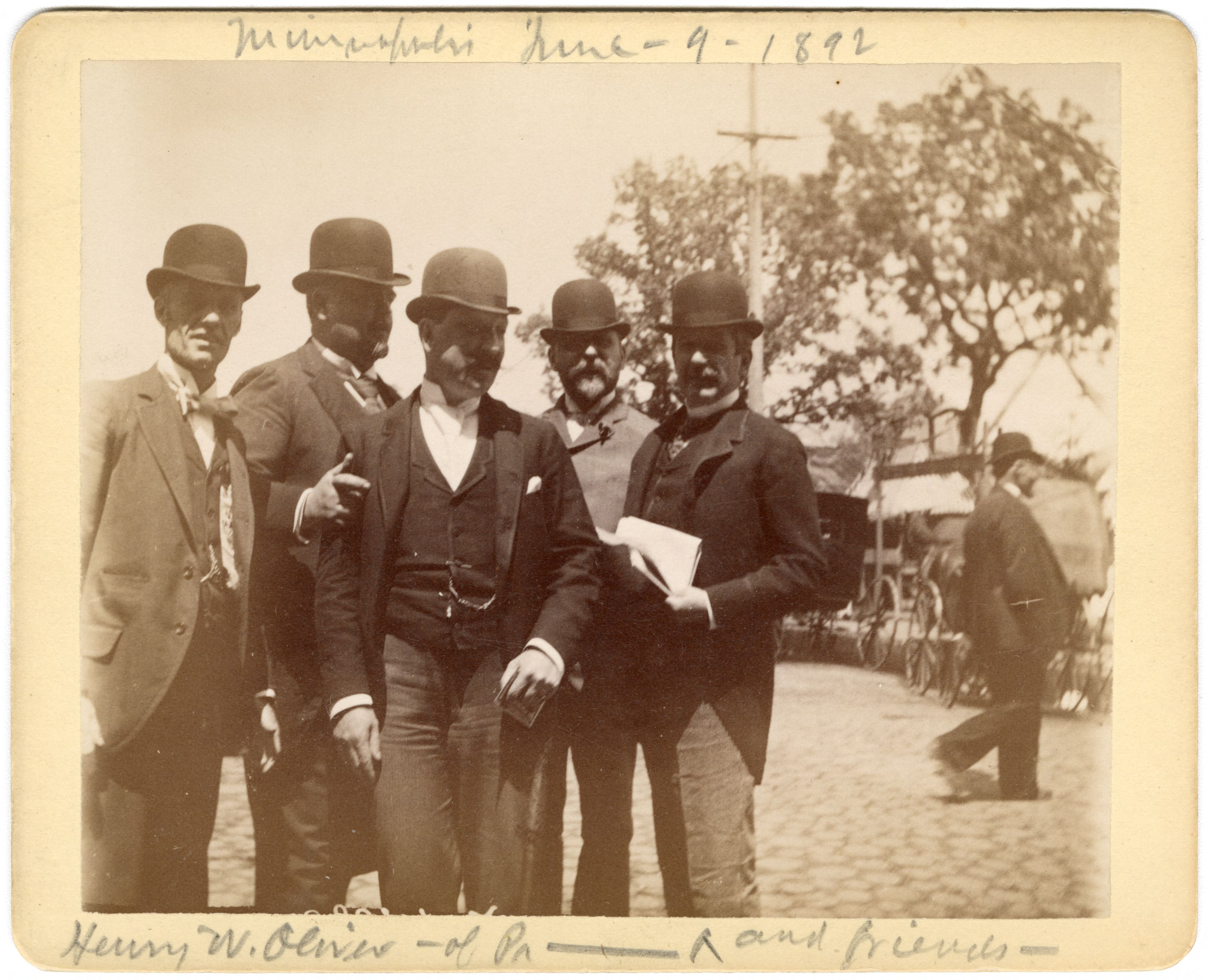
Oliver with friends at an 1892 convention in Minneapolis

Henry W. Oliver (February 25, 1840 – February 8, 1904) was an American industrialist.

== Biography ==
Henry W. Oliver was born in Ireland in 1840. Two years later his family settled in Pittsburgh. Oliver began working at the age of thirteen as a messenger boy for the National Telegraph Company in Pittsburgh. Oliver worked at various jobs until 1861 when he served in the Civil War. In 1863, he formed a partnership with William J. Lewis and John Phillips to create the firm of Lewis, Oliver and Phillips to manufacture nuts and bolts on a small scale. By 1868, two of his brothers joined the firm and in 1880, they formed the firm, Oliver Brothers and Phillips. By this time, the company was one of the largest manufacturers of bar iron and iron specialties in the United States. In 1888, the company incorporated under the name of Oliver Iron and Steel Company. Oliver was involved in working with the Mesabi ore region near Lake Superior in Minnesota, spinning off the Oliver Iron Mining Company from his other interests in a venture with the Carnegie Steel Company. The Lake Superior iron ore industry became the basis for United States Steel.

Oliver helped to develop improved processes for steel making, brought about a new and improved design for blast furnaces, and assisted in helping to finance several of Pittsburgh's large steel industries. Much of his energy was devoted to bringing new railroad routes into Pittsburgh (including the Pittsburgh and Lake Erie as well as the South Pennsylvania Railroad) and to providing new terminal belt lines for the city. He also helped to develop the steel freight car (in place of the small wooden cars previously used). Perhaps his most important action, however, was spearhead efforts to "slack water" the Ohio River so that Pittsburgh had a transportation mode that was reliable year round rather than being dependent on the river's vagaries.

He would become politically active with the Republican Party in Pittsburgh. He married Edith Cassidy in 1862. The Olivers had one daughter. Five years after his death, Oliver's brother George T. Oliver became a United States Senator.
