= West Elizabeth, Pennsylvania =

Borough in Pennsylvania, US

- Borough
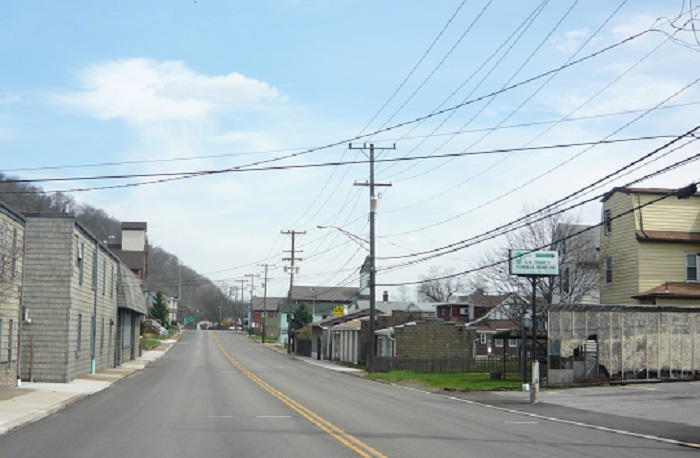
- Fifth Street

- Location in Allegheny County and the U.S. state of Pennsylvania.
- Coordinates: 40°16′22″N 79°53′42″W
- Country: United States
- State: Pennsylvania
- County: Allegheny

Area
  - Total: 0.24 sq mi (0.63 km^{2})
  - Land: 0.18 sq mi (0.46 km^{2})
  - Water: 0.066 sq mi (0.17 km^{2})

Population (2020)
  - Total: 403
  - Density: 2,257.0/sq mi (871.44/km^{2})
- Time zone: UTC-5 (Eastern (EST))
  - Summer (DST): UTC-4 (EDT)
- ZIP codes: 15088
- FIPS code: 42-82848

West Elizabeth is a borough in Allegheny County, Pennsylvania, United States. The population was 403 at the 2020 census.

== History ==
Sketch showing Elizabeth and West Elizabeth, PA, circa 1897

The town was initially laid out in 1833, and incorporated March 3, 1848. West Elizabeth was a coal mining and boat-building town. Coal was transported by barge down the Monongahela River to industries in Pittsburgh. Coal was transported from the mine to the river by Walton's Coal Incline and the O'Neil and Company Incline.

== Geography ==
West Elizabeth is located at 40°16′22″N 79°53′42″W (40.272901, −79.894918).

According to the United States Census Bureau, the borough has a total area of 0.3 square miles (0.78 km^{2}), of which 0.2 square miles (0.52 km^{2}) is land and 0.1 square miles (0.26 km^{2}), or 27.59%, is water.

=== Surrounding and adjacent neighborhoods ===
Situated along the Monongahela River, West Elizabeth is surrounded by Jefferson Hills. Across the river, West Elizabeth runs adjacent with the borough of Elizabeth and has a direct connector via Malady Bridge.

== Demographics ==
Historical population
Census	Pop.	Note	%±
1850	328		—
1860	364		11.0%
1870	590		62.1%
1880	838		42.0%
1890	719		−14.2%
1900	747		3.9%
1910	841		12.6%
1920	890		5.8%
1930	1,074		20.7%
1940	1,297		20.8%
1950	1,137		−12.3%
1960	921		−19.0%
1970	848		−7.9%
1980	808		−4.7%
1990	634		−21.5%
2000	565		−10.9%
2010	518		−8.3%
2020	403		−22.2%
U.S. Decennial Census

As of the 2000 census, there were 565 people, 247 households, and 153 families residing in the borough.

The population density was 2,764.6 inhabitants per square mile (1,067.4/km^{2}). There were 279 housing units at an average density of 1,365.2 per square mile (527.1/km^{2}).

The racial makeup of the borough was 99.29% White, 0.18% African American, 0.35% Asian, and 0.18% from two or more races.

There were 247 households, out of which 28.3% had children who were under the age of eighteen living with them; 38.1% were married couples living together, 17.4% had a female householder with no husband present, and 37.7% were non-families. Out of all of the households that were documented, 34.0% of were made up of individuals, and 13.0% had someone living alone who was sixty-five years of age or older.

The average household size was 2.29 and the average family size was 2.92.

Within the borough, the population was spread out, with 22.5% of residents who were under the age of eighteen, 7.6% who were aged eighteen to twenty-four, 31.2% who were aged twenty-five to forty-four, 21.9% who were aged forty-five to sixty-four, and 16.8% who were sixty-five years of age or older. The median age was thirty-seven years.

For every one hundred females, there were 86.5 males. For every one hundred females who were aged eighteen or older, there were 84.8 males.

The median income for a household in the borough was $26,339, and the median income for a family was $32,500. Males had a median income of $36,667 compared with that of $19,712 for females.

The per capita income for the borough was $14,687.

Approximately 9.4% of families and 15.5% of the population were living below the poverty line, including 22.1% of those who were under the age of eighteen and 13.1% of those who were aged sixty-five or older.

== Government and politics ==
Presidential election results
Year	Republican	Democratic	Third parties
2020	59% 116	39% 77	1% 2
2016	62% 103	38% 64	0% 0
2012	54% 98	44% 81	2% 4
