= Waltersburg, Pennsylvania =

Unincorporated community in Pennsylvania, US

- Unincorporated community
- Location within Pennsylvania
- Coordinates: 39°58′49″N 79°45′50″W
- Country: United States
- State: Pennsylvania
- County: Fayette
- Elevation: 899 ft (274 m)
- Time zone: UTC-5 (Eastern (EST))
  - Summer (DST): UTC-4 (EDT)
- ZIP code: 15488
- Area codes: 724, 878
- GNIS feature ID: 1190563

Waltersburg is an unincorporated community in Fayette County, Pennsylvania, United States. The community is located along Pennsylvania Route 51, 6 miles (9.7 km) north of Uniontown. Waltersburg has a post office, with ZIP code 15488. William Harper retired as postmaster from this location after over 45 years of service. He still resides today with his wife in their home in Waltersburg.
