= Pittsburgh Coalfield =

Coordinates: 40°05′N 80°00′W

The Pittsburgh Coalfield (Pittsburgh Coal Region) is the largest of the Western Pennsylvania coalfields. It includes all or part of Allegheny, Fayette, Greene, Washington, and Westmoreland Counties in Pennsylvania. Coal has been mined in Pittsburgh since the 18th century. U.S. Steel and Bethlehem Steel owned Karen, Maple Creek, and Ellsworth mines. It is not possible to define sharp geographical boundaries for this district for none such exist or are reported differently. The largest company in this field was the Pittsburgh Coal Company, which later became CONSOL Energy. It is bordered on the west by the state of West Virginia, on the south by Panhandle Coalfield and Klondike Coalfield, on the East by Irwin Gas Coalfield, on the North by the Freeport Coalfield and at least one other coalfield. The Darr Mine Disaster occurred in this coalfield in 1907.

== See also ==
- Pittsburgh coal seam
