= Eichleay Engineers =

Eichleay Engineers Inc
- Company type: engineering
- Founded: 1875
- Founder: John P. Eichleay, Jr.
- Headquarters: Pittsburgh, Pennsylvania, U.S.A.
- Website: https://www.eichleay.com

Eichleay Engineers is a United States engineering firm.

== History ==
In 1875, an innovative building inspector named John P. Eichleay, Jr. founded a structural moving business that would soon become renowned for completing projects believed by many to be impossible. The advent of the industrial age brought with it profound changes in urban landscapes of America. This transformation was perhaps no more evident than in John's hometown of Pittsburgh, Pennsylvania. As the preeminent center of industry and technology at the time, small houses and buildings were being torn down to make room for larger ones, industrial plants were pushing residential neighborhoods outward from the rivers and railroads, and street railways permitted people to live further from their places of work. Believing that structures could be moved for only a fraction of the cost of demolishing and rebuilding them, John felt that all of these factors made for a lucrative business. They did! Although the projects undertaken during the early years were quite modest, they became increasingly bold and impressive as techniques were perfected and the reputation of the company grew.

In 2002, the firm was placed into receivership due to financial problems. Split into two divisions, the assets of the firm were purchased by SNC-Lavalin and Pittsburgh-based S/D Engineers.

== Eichleay Formula ==
The Eichleay company is noted for being the namesake of a formula used for pricing federal change orders and/or dispute claims. In 1954, Eichleay was under contract for the construction of three NIKE missile sites in Pennsylvania. The government changed the scope of work, resulting in change orders. The process of delaying the work, however, resulted in losses for Eichleay due in part to maintained overhead costs during the suspension period. The resultant ruling recognized that (1) a contractor should be entitled to compensation for unabsorbed overhead resulting from owner caused delay, and (2) there was, at the time, no accepted method of allocating home office overhead to a particular contract to determine the amount of compensation.

== Notable employees ==
The firm at one time employed Andy Warhol's father. It also provided a day job to the cartoonist Scott McDaniel, prior to his full-time work in cartooning.
