= Mon Line =

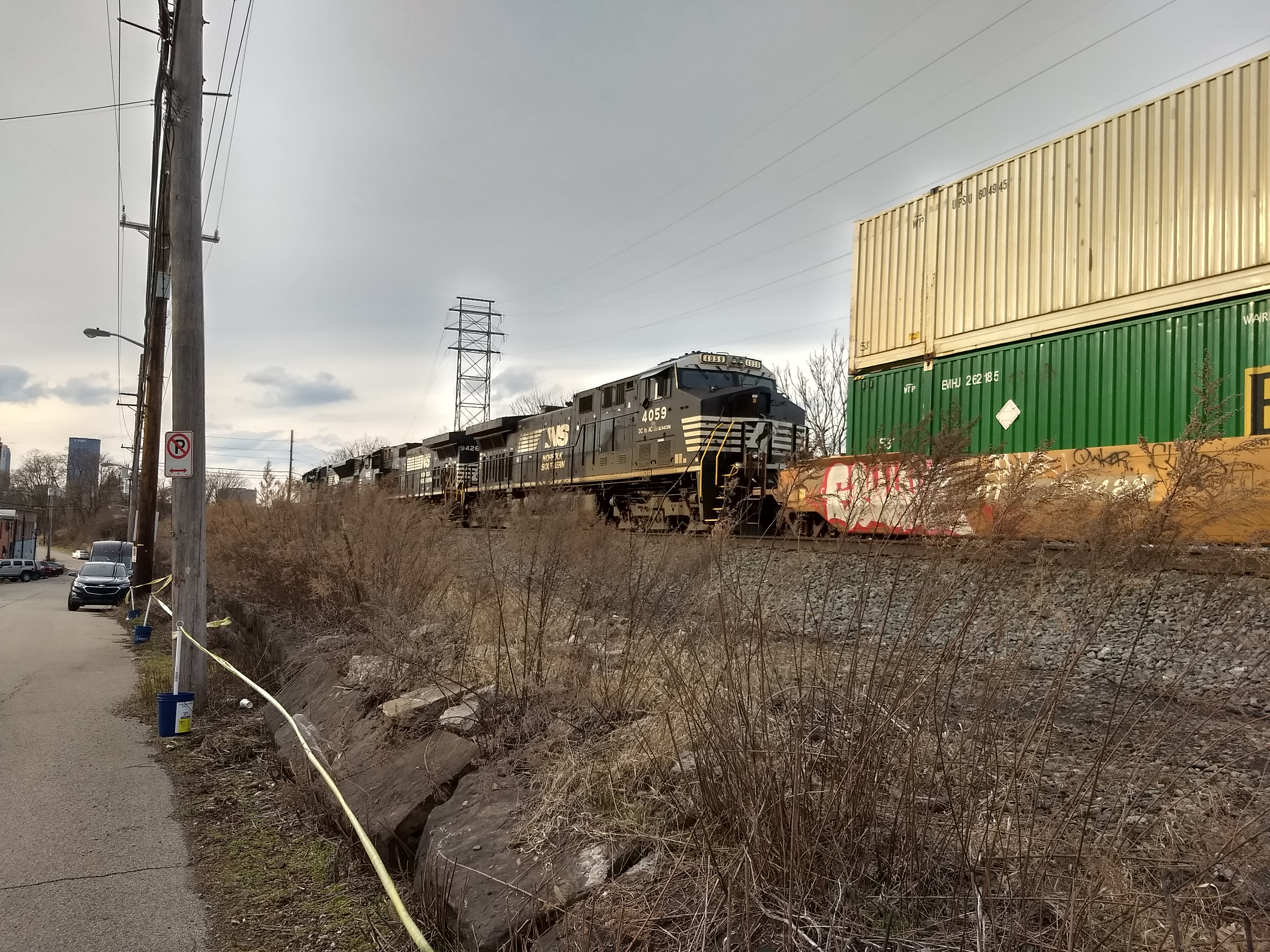
- A double-stack container train on the Mon Line in South Side, Pittsburgh.

Overview
- Status: Operational
- Owner: Norfolk Southern (from 1999); Conrail (until 1999); Penn Central (until 1976); Pennsylvania Railroad (until 1968); Pittsburgh, Virginia and Charleston Railway (until 1905)
- Locale: southwestern Pennsylvania
- Termini: CP-BELL in Pittsburgh; Near Waynesburg

Service
- Type: Freight rail
- System: Norfolk Southern
- Operator: Norfolk Southern

History
- Opened: 1872

Technical
- Line length: 85 mi (137 km)
- Number of tracks: 1-2
- Track gauge: 4 ft 8 1/2 in (1,435 mm) standard gauge

The Mon Line is an 85-mile (137 km) long Norfolk Southern rail line which runs along the Monongahela River for most of its route.

== History ==
The predecessor of this line is the Pittsburgh, Virginia and Charleston Railway. The northern portion (Pittsburgh to West Brownsville) of the line is the former main line of the Monongahela Division of the Pennsylvania Railroad, and the southern portion (West Brownsville to Waynesburg) was once part of the Monongahela Railway's Waynesburg Southern Branch.

Its northern terminus was formerly at the junction with the Panhandle Route at the Panhandle Bridge in Pittsburgh, and its southern terminus was near Brownsville, Pennsylvania where it had a connection to the Monongahela Railway.

Conrail transferred the West Brownsville to Waynesburg trackage from the Waynesburg Southern Branch to the former main line of the PRR Monongahela Division and it became the new Mon Line.

In the 1990s, the northern section of the Mon Line began to be used, together with the Port Perry Branch, as a high-clearance route for double-stack container trains.

In 2016, a landslide occurred on the Mon Line at the foot of Mount Washington, on part of the line used for double-stack trains. Due to the landslide, Norfolk Southern sought funding in 2017 in order to create an alternative double-stack route through Pittsburgh, using the Pittsburgh Line and the Fort Wayne Line.

On August 5, 2018, a train running on the Mon Line derailed east of Pittsburgh's Station Square complex and blocked the tracks, forcing freight service to be suspended. The derailed cars fell down the hillside and onto the tracks below at the "T" light rail system's Station Square station and damaged 1,600 feet (490 m) of light rail tracks; 4,000 feet (1,200 m) of overhead electrical wires; and some concrete on the Panhandle Bridge. The derailment caused no injuries as it occurred 2 minutes after a light rail train departed the station. During cleanup and inspections of the area, the Mount Washington Transit Tunnel was closed and "T" trains were rerouted via the former Brown Line through Allentown. The outbound light rail tracks were opened on August 23, while inbound light rail service resumed on August 25 after repairs were completed. A preliminary report by the Federal Railroad Administration's investigation team found that a fractured track caused the derailment. Norfolk Southern filed a lawsuit in December 2018 seeking $1.1 million in reimbursements from the city for the incident, claiming that they had neglected to maintain the hillside.

== Route ==
The line begins at CP-BELL, at a junction with the Fort Wayne Line, and then crosses the Ohio River on the Ohio Connecting Railroad Bridge, and proceeds along the southern side of the Ohio and Monongahela rivers. The Port Perry Branch joins the line at the PRR Port Perry Bridge near Duquesne, Pennsylvania. There is a section of on-street running track in West Brownsville, Pennsylvania. The line ends near Waynesburg, Pennsylvania.

== Usage ==
The Mon Line is used for high-clearance double stack container trains between the Fort Wayne Line and the Port Perry Branch, which continues on to join the Pittsburgh Line to points further east. This bypasses the easternmost portion of the Fort Wayne Line and the westernmost part of the Pittsburgh Line, which have clearance issues for double-stack trains as of 2016.

The line also serves coal mines south of Pittsburgh, including the Bailey Mine.

== See also ==
- Fort Wayne Line
- Port Perry Branch
- Pittsburgh, Virginia and Charleston Railway
- Monongahela Railway
- Pennsylvania Railroad
