= Port Perry Bridge (Pennsylvania Railroad) =

PRR Port Perry Bridge
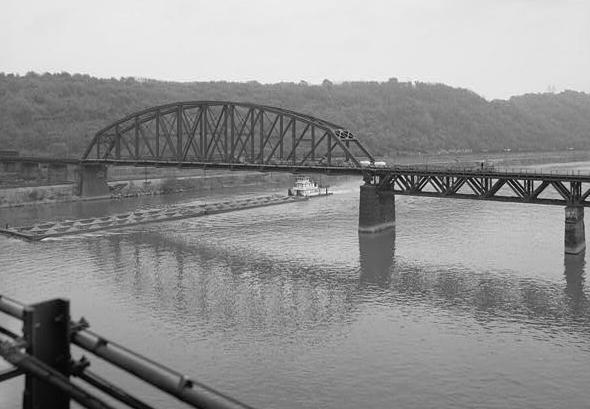
- Coordinates: 40.3871°N 79.8513°W
- Carries: Norfolk Southern Railway Port Perry Branch
- Crosses: Monongahela River
- Locale: North Versailles Township, Pennsylvania and Duquesne, Pennsylvania

Characteristics
- Design: Truss bridge
- Longest span: 409.5 feet (124.8 m)
- Clearance below: 45.6 feet (13.9 m)

History
- Opened: 1903

Location
- Interactive map of PRR Port Perry Bridge

The PPR Port Perry Bridge is a truss bridge that carries the Port Perry Branch of the Norfolk Southern Railway across the Monongahela River between the Pennsylvania towns of North Versailles Township and Duquesne. The bridge was built to serve the Pennsylvania Railroad, to provide better access to industrial sites, and to help through trains bypass downtown Pittsburgh. Today, the bridge and corresponding route serve a similar purpose and are used to allow high-level loads, especially double-stacked container cars, to avoid the narrower routes through Pittsburgh.

== See also ==
- List of bridges documented by the Historic American Engineering Record in Pennsylvania
- Port Perry, Pennsylvania
