= Union Railroad Clairton Bridge =

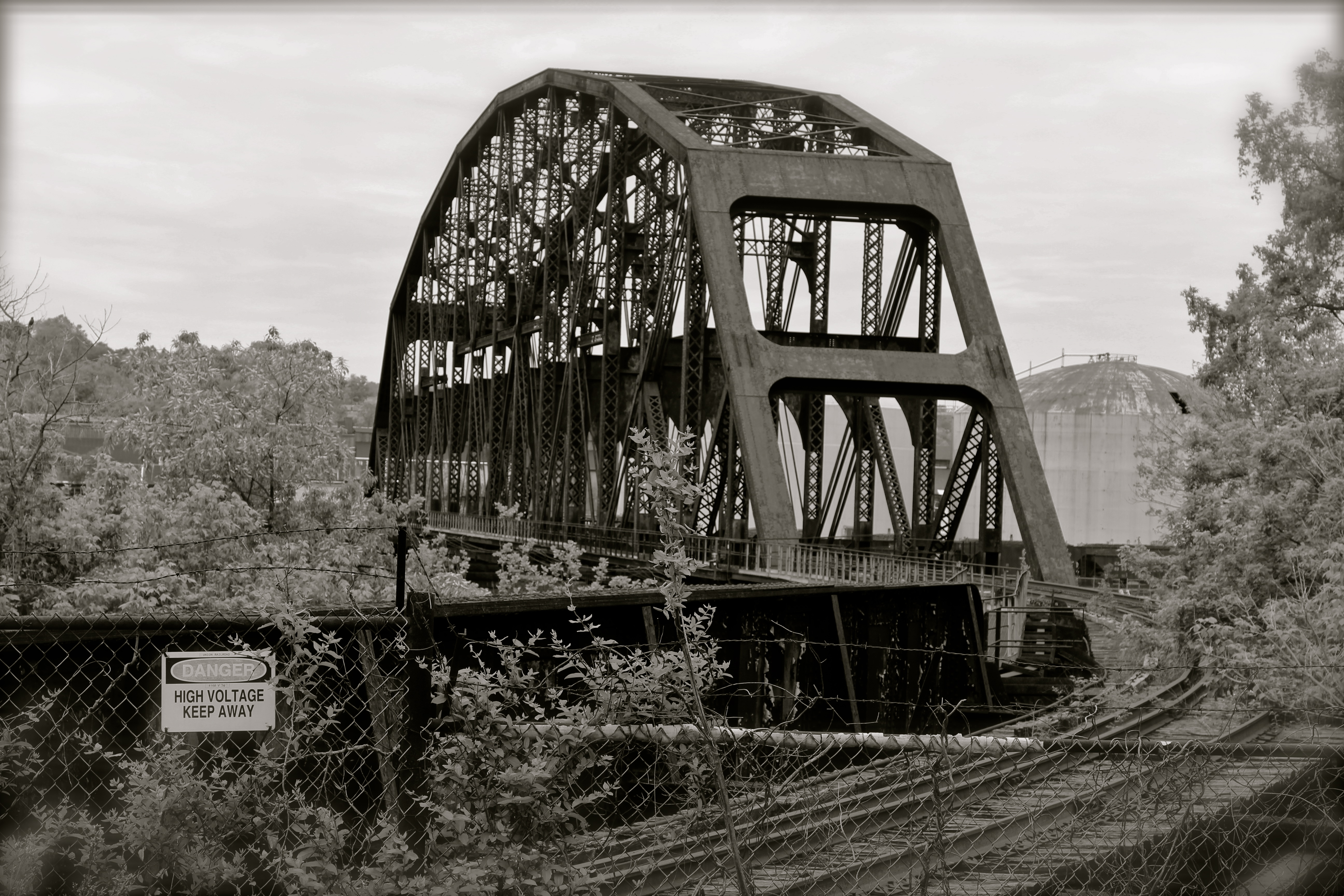
- Coordinates: 40.2945°N 79.8669°W
- Carries: Pennsylvania Union Railroad
- Crosses: Monongahela River
- Locale: Clairton, Pennsylvania and Lincoln, Pennsylvania
- Official name: Clairton Coke Works Bridge

Characteristics
- Design: Truss bridge
- Longest span: 482.0 feet (146.9 m)
- Clearance below: 47.5 feet (14.5 m)

History
- Opened: 1893

Location
- Interactive map of Union Railroad Clairton Bridge

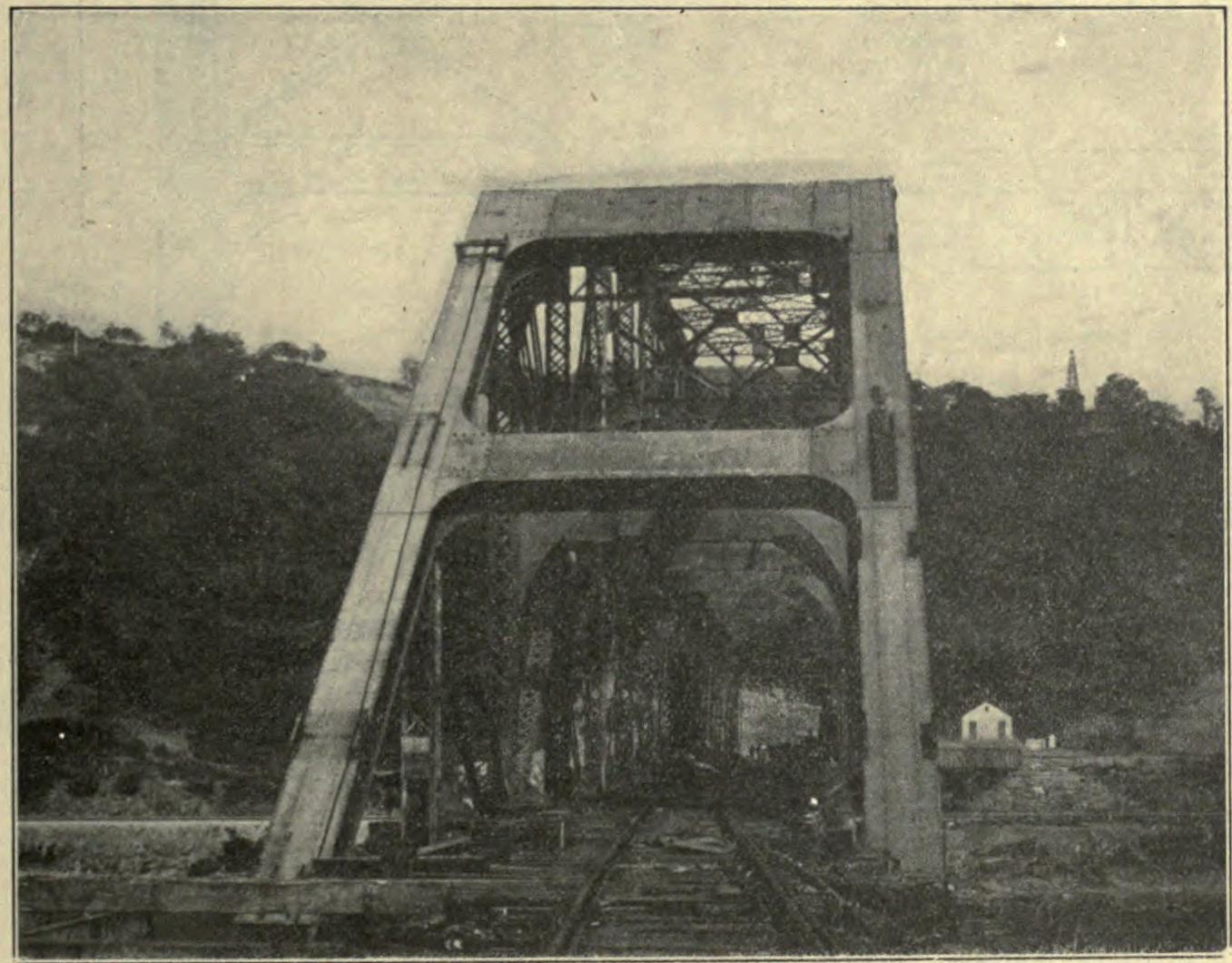
The bridge some time around the early 1900s.

The Union Railroad Clairton Bridge, commonly known as the Clairton Coke Works Bridge, is a truss bridge which crosses the Monongahela River in Allegheny County, Pennsylvania. It formerly carried traffic between Clairton and Lincoln, Pennsylvania, for the Pennsylvania Union Railroad which is owned and operated by Transtar, Inc., a subsidiary of the United States Steel Corporation. The structure, which featured a single track, has been out of service since the 1970s; rail traffic was rerouted to the US Steel Clairton Works as the steel industry began to decline.

The bridge is currently slated to become part of the Montour Trail, one of many current Pittsburgh-area bike trails projects.

== See also ==
- Clairton–Glassport Bridge
