= Union Railroad (Pittsburgh) =

Railroad in Allegheny County, Pennsylvania, United States

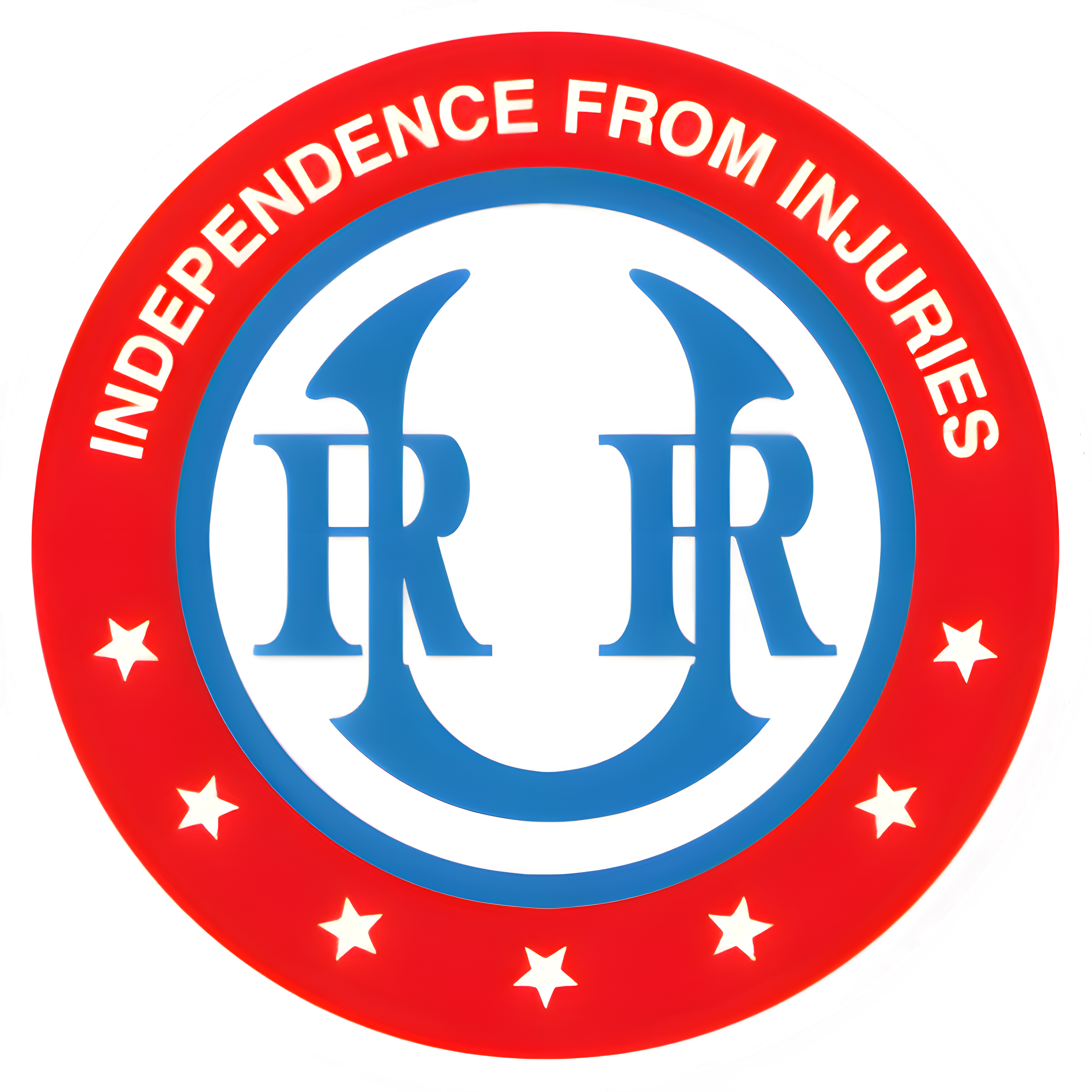

Overview
- Headquarters: 1200 Penn Avenue, Suite 300, Pittsburgh, Pennsylvania, 15222
- Reporting mark: URR
- Locale: Allegheny County, Pennsylvania
- Dates of operation: 1896–present

Technical
- Track gauge: 4 ft 8 1/2 in (1,435 mm) standard gauge

The Union Railroad (reporting mark URR) is a Class III switching railroad located in Allegheny County in Western Pennsylvania. The company is owned by Transtar, Inc., which is a subsidiary of Fortress Transportation and Infrastructure Investors, after being acquired from U.S. Steel in 2021. The railroad's primary customers are the three plants of the USS Mon Valley Works, the USS Edgar Thomson Steel Works (blast furnaces, basic oxygen steelmaking, and continuous slab casting), the USS Irvin Plant (hot and cold rolling mills and finishing lines) and the USS Clairton Coke Works (producer of coke for blast furnace ironmaking).

== History ==
Andrew Carnegie had been discussing rail transport with other lines, but determined the best way to protect his interests was to control the rail line himself. Several smaller companies had constructed sections of the route. "Bear Creek Railroad (name changed to Shenango and Allegheny Railroad Co.) was incorporated in March 1865 for the purpose of moving coal 21 miles from Pardoe to Shenango for delivery to other railroads and the Erie Extension Canal. By 1883, Shenango and Allegheny had extended north to Greenville, Pennsylvania, and south to Butler, Pennsylvania. By 1892, the line had extended north to reach the port of Conneaut, Ohio. The extensions carried their own descriptive corporate names and survived a series of corporate reorganizations to become the Pittsburgh, Shenango and Lake Erie." The rail line had been completed as far as Butler, still 40 miles distant from the Mon Valley. The first ore boat arrived in Conneaut in 1892, stimulating the interest of Andrew Carnegie. In April 1896, a tri-party agreement between PS&LE, Union Railroad Company and Carnegie Steel Company called for the construction of a line from Butler to East Pittsburgh. The Butler and Pittsburgh Railroad Company was incorporated on April 8, 1896, and completed, spectacularly, by October 27, 1897, including a long, single-track bridge across the Allegheny River. Also in 1897, PS&LE and B&P were consolidated into the Pittsburgh, Bessemer & Lake Erie under majority ownership of Carnegie. The Union Railroad, nicknamed "The Railroad in the Sky," was created in 1896. The railroad, as it exists today, has resulted from the union of five different railroads between the years 1906 and 1915. The original URR extended from East Pittsburgh to Hays, a distance of six miles, and was constructed in the years 1894–1907.

Four years later, Carnegie formed the Bessemer and Lake Erie Railroad under this exclusive ownership and arranged to lease PS&LE for 999 years. This arrangement stayed in place with the formation of U. S. Steel in 1901, which bought out Carnegie's interests.

The Union was expanded to include several other mills in the Mon Valley Region. The Union was responsible for the various switching task within each mill, for delivering raw materials to each mill (which would arrive on the Union via interchange with the Bessemer & Lake Erie, another US Steel owned and operated railroad) and for delivering the finished products to interchange with the major railroads in the area (most notable the Pennsylvania, the Baltimore & Ohio and the Pittsburgh & Lake Erie).

In 1906, B&LE leased and later sold the portion of the line between North Bessemer and East Pittsburgh to the Union Railroad.

At its peak, the Union served eight separate steel mills and numerous other businesses (see below for complete list)- USS Homestead, USS Rankin, USS Edgar Thomson, USS Duquesne-National, USS National Tube & Pipe, USS Clairton, the relatively new USS Irvin rolling mill and Grant Steel in Duquesne, Pennsylvania. The URR also used four bridges crossing the Monongahela River - Union Railroad Port Perry Bridge, Union Railroad Clairton Bridge, McKeesport Connecting Railroad Bridge (also known as: Union Railroad Riverton Bridge), Carrie Furnace Hot Metal Bridge (also known as: Union Railroad Rankin Hot Metal Bridge) - and was one of the busy railroads in the United States by tonnage hauled. Unlike the rest of the steel industry, the Union was relatively accepting of modernization as demonstrated by the construction of a then state-of-the-art yard and dispatching center in Duquesne, Pennsylvania, in the early 1950s. With the decline of the steel industry in the United States, the Union's operations were greatly scaled back.

On August 11, 2025, an explosion involving personnel injuries was reported to occur at Clairton Coke Works.

== Today's Operation ==
Today, the Union's main traffic movements include handling iron ore from North Bessemer interchange. Edgar Thomson receives coke from the Clairton works, which is also interchanged to Dexter yard; other movements include slabs from Edgar Thomson to the Irvin works and finished steel products (coils) from Irvin works to the interchanges. Only the Port Perry Bridge remains open for rail traffic. For inner-mill service, the Edgar Thomson plant uses US Steel-owned EMD switchers to move the hot metal subs and unload tressel.

Crews from the URR utilize the railroad's own EMDs for general switching duties within the mill. Their duties include moving loaded ore and coke cars to the staging yard and trestle, spotting and pulling the caster and slab mills, and bringing in scrap and flux cars to the BOP, or "Basic Oxygen Process".

After the Riverton bridge closed in 2008, there is no remaining rail connection between the URR network and McKeesport Tubular Operations at "Camp Hill". The switching of McKeesport Tubular is therefore the duty of the McKeesport Connecting Railroad (MKC), another subsidiary of Transtar. The Duquesne Coal Docks are still in operation, where scrap metal is unloaded from barges to be used at Edgar Thomson and interchange with Norfolk Southern in the Kenny Yard.

Despite these changes in operations, the Union Railroad continues to serve the Monongahela Valley and has since expanded its customer base to include Dura-Bond pipe coating in the former Duquesne Works site and General Electric in West Mifflin, which necessitates the hauling of special oversized generators.

== Timeline ==
- 1894–1907 – The original URR extended from East Pittsburgh to Hays, a distance of six miles.
- July 2, 1894 – Union Railroad came into existence
- 1895 – Received the heaviest and most powerful locomotive built to that date.
- 1896 – Incorporated
- October 26, 1897 – the first 30-car ore train from North Bessemer yard through the new North Bessemer Tunnel to Edgar Thompson Steel Mill
- At year's end, 5 million tons of freight cars traveled over the URR.
- June 30, 1898 – The first train over the newly completed Port Perry Bridge
- December 31, 1900 – Carrie Furnace bridge opened to hot metal traffic.
- June 14, 1901 – Carrie Furnace bridge opens for general traffic.
- December 1907 – Completion of the Homestead connection between Port Perry Bridge and the north end of Munhall Yard
- 1917- 1920 – The Clairton Branch of the Monongahela Southern Railroad was constructed, it extended from Clairton Junction (Bull Run) to a connection with the St. Clair Terminal Railroad in Clairton and was first opened to operations on April 14, 1919.
- June 10, 1950 – Dedication of the New Union Railroad Diesel Shop Hall, Pennsylvania, a state-of-the-art servicing facility for their increasing diesel fleet.
- Year's end 1951 – all-time high of 74,440,776 net tons of revenue freight were handled. The largest concentration of freight in the world.

== Interchanges ==
- Penn Hills Twp (North Bessemer)
  - B&LE (CN)
  - Unity
- East Pittsburgh (Dexter Yard)
  - CSX
  - P&LE @ Union JCT
  - PRR @ Valley Yard
- McKeesport (Riverton)
  - CSX
- Kenny Yard
  - Norfolk Southern
  - PRR
- West Mifflin (Mifflin Junction)
  - Wheeling and Lake Erie Railway
  - P&WV and MTR
- Clairton(Peter's Creek and Conley Yards)
  - Norfolk Southern
  - Wheeling and Lake Erie Railway
  - PWV and PRR
  - P&LE @ Wylie

== Notable facilities ==
=== Steel mills ===
- U.S. Steel Homestead Works - Homestead, Pennsylvania - Steel Operations ceased in 1986. Razed in late 80's. Shopping area called The Waterfront opened in 1999.
- U.S. Steel Carrie Furnace - Rankin, Pennsylvania - Part of the Rivers of Steel National Heritage Area
- U.S. Steel Edgar Thomson Steel Works - Braddock, Pennsylvania - Andrew Carnegie's first steel mill completed in 1875. Still in operation. Oldest integrated steel mill in the world.
- U.S. Steel Duquesne Works - Duquesne, Pennsylvania - Steel operations ended 1984. Razed in late 1990s. now RIDC Park with a U.S. Steel Training Hub
- U.S. Steel Mon Valley Works - Irvin Plant - West Mifflin, Pennsylvania - Constructed 1937-1938, still in operation - Rolling mills and finishing operations.
- U.S. Steel Clairton Works - Clairton, Pennsylvania - Steel mill operation ended in 1984 - Coke Works continues to operate and produce coke and coke by-products. Largest coking facility in North America.
- U.S. Steel National Works - McKeesport, Pennsylvania - Original operations ended in 1987. Pipe and Tube works operations resumed in 2011 after purchase of remaining pipe mills from Camp Hill Corporation.

=== Yards ===
Prior to 1980 Reading from the northernmost point south.

- North Bessemer Yards - North Bessemer was made up of six yards plus car shop tracks(Penn Hills Twp)Along with Interchange tracks with the Unity Junction and the Bessemer and Lake Erie.
- Northbound Empty Yard, Cabbage Patch, North Yard, South Yard, East Yard and West Yard
- Hershey Siding Universal
- North Yard - (Penn Hills Twp)
- Hall Yard - Hall Roundhouse Wilkins Township, Pennsylvania
- Oak Hill - South of Hall was made up of four yards (Monroeville and Wilkins Twp)
- Santiago Yard, Peterson Yard, South Yard and Newtown Yard
- Edgar Thomson Yards Braddock, Pennsylvania are as follows: *Valley Yard, Rail Yard, Joe Wolfe, Ore Yard, Port Perry Yard.
- Homestead and Rankin Yards as follows: *Munhall A Yard and Munhall B Yard, Farm Yard, C, D, E, and F Yards, Hays Yard, West Run Yard
- Duquesne Yards - Classification Yard Duquesne - Orchard, Swamp, Duquesne Furnace, Duquesne PVC, Duquesne Coal Docs
- Mifflin Junction Yards - Mifflin Junction in West Mifflin
- Homestead Yards -
- Irvin "A" Yard Storage
- Irvin "B" Yard Empty and Loaded Slab Racks
- Clairton "E" Yard Empty Hoppers
- Clairton "C" Yard Empty Tanks
- Clairton "B" Yard Loaded Hoppers

=== Bridges ===
- URR Port Perry Bridge - over Monongahela River between Port Perry (North Versailles Twp) and Duquesne
- Union Railroad Coal Valley Bridge, Wilson, Pa - Over Rt 837 and the former PRR Mon Branch now Norfolk Southern RR

==== No Longer In Use (by the railroad) ====
- URR Rankin Hot Metal Bridge - over Monongahela River between Rankin and Whitaker
- URR Riverton Bridge - over Monongahela River between Duquesne and McKeesport Part of the Great Allegheny Passage Rails to Trails network
- URR Clairton Bridge - over Monongahela River between Clairton and Belle Bridge (Lincoln Borough)

=== Tunnels ===
- North Bessemer Tunnel - between North Bessemer and Universal (Penn Hills Twp)
- Dravosburg Tunnel - between West Mifflin (south of West Mifflin Park) and Dravosburg
- Airport Tunnel - under runway 10-28 and taxiway A of Allegheny County Airport in West Mifflin

=== Local businesses once served ===
- Universal Atlas Concrete Penn Hills
- Chambers Dump
- Butler Refractories
- Westinghouse Linhart division - Wemco E.Pgh
- Linde Air
- 84 Lumber
- General Electric Generators
- Pittsburgh Alloy Inc
- Risher Dump
- Taylor Dump
- Brown's Dump
- Continental Can Company
- Joseph M. Alfery & Associates
- Shwayder Bros., Inc Chair mfg co. Mifflin
- Tube City on the site of the former United Iron and Metal Company
- General Motors Fisher Body
- Ford Motor Co.
- Grant Steel

== Roster ==
The Union RR has operated many locomotives over the years. During the steam era, the railroad was the only operator of the 0-10-2. It also was known to run 2-8-0 "Consolidations" and 0-6-0s. The 0-6-0s were built by Lima and were significantly heavier than the USRA 0-6-0s. At its height of operation, as many as 115 locomotives operated at once, including the current 33 locomotives on the roster. Among the more notable steam locomotives on the Union Railroad roster was engine 95, a 2-10-0 that was the most powerful locomotive built at its time (1895). Engine 115, a 2-8-0, appeared in a few promotional pictures for local charities. Common 0-6-0 switchers included engines 77, 118 (built by Baldwin), 119, 120, and 163. Oversized 0-6-0s were built for the railroad in 1936 by Lima and included engines 187 and 188. There were 6 of these ordered. Most Union Railroad 0-6-0 switchers did not have the sloping tenders (although a few did) but maintained a traditionally designed tender (for non-switchers). The famous 0-10-2 "Unions" were built by Baldwin and were numbered 301-310. From 1941 until 1953, the URR would gradually replace their fleet of steam locomotives with diesel locomotives.

Road Number	Model
451-454	ALCO S-1
455-476	EMD SW1
500-505	Baldwin VO-1000
506-535	ALCO S-2
536-537	ALCO S-4
541-560	EMD NW2
571-574	EMD SW7
575-587	EMD SW9
601-612	ALCO RS-2
613-624	Baldwin DRS-6-6-1500
625-627	Baldwin AS-616
701-704	EMD TR5A/B

After 1970, some used engines (eleven EMD SW9 and six EMD SD9 from the DM&IR, five SD38-2 from the B&LE, and a few from other roads) and three new EMD SW1001 (Nos. 101 - 103) joined the URR.

The current roster is made up completely of second-generation EMD Switcher Units. The majority of the switchers are painted blue, but numerous units are painted different colors, including No.3 and No.17 are painted green, while No.1 and No.33 have a new yellow and red scheme.

Road Number	Model
1-9	EMD SW1500
10-33	EMD MP15DC

== Unique locomotive power ==
The Union Railroad is unique in that it is a switching railroad, yet its loads are heavier than other switching railroads. Freight carried on the railroad includes iron ore, coke, coal, molten slag, and steel. This unique combination, in addition to the steep grades around Pittsburgh, demanded some special tractive force. In 1898, the largest locomotive of the time was built for the Union Railroad. This 2-8-0 had more weight on its drivers (208,000 pounds) than any built up to that time. This was locomotive 95 in the U.R.R. stable and, according to the article, was built by Pittsburg(h)(sic) Locomotive Works.

In the 1930s, the Lima Locomotive Works began to build oversized 0-6-0s for use on the URR. These were among the largest 0-6-0s ever built. The 0-10-2 wheel arrangement was named the Union type after the railroad and produced over 100,000 pounds of tractive effort. Built for the Union RR by the Baldwin Locomotive Works, they boasted the title of "largest steam switch locomotive ever produced". The Union RR took delivery of 10 such locomotives. Only one survives today and is on static display in Greenville, Pennsylvania, painted as Duluth, Missabe and Iron Range (DM&IR) #604.
