= Port Perry Bridge (Union Railroad) =

Union Railroad Port Perry Bridge
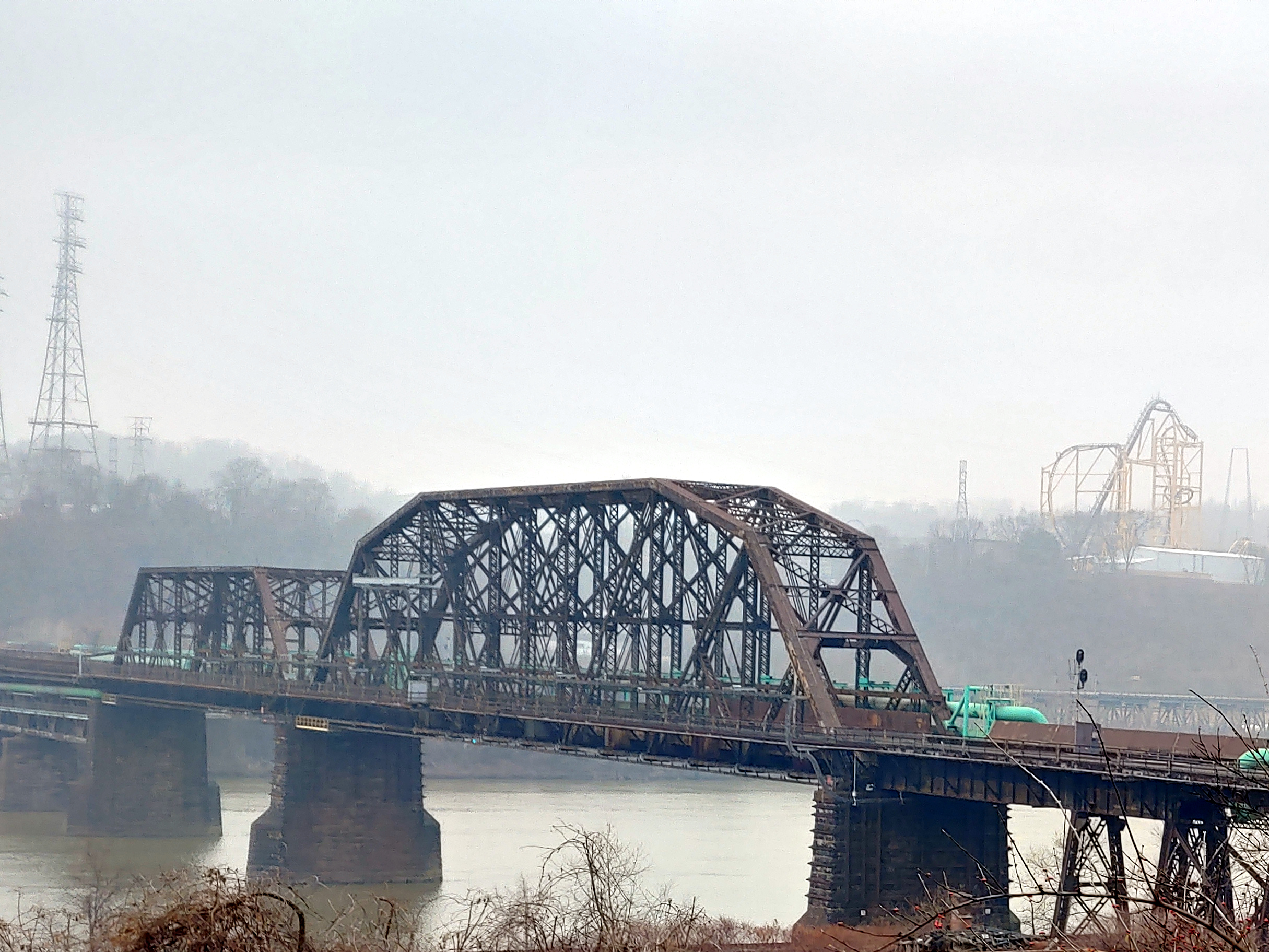
- Coordinates: 40.3880°N 79.8522°W
- Carries: Pennsylvania Union Railroad
- Crosses: Monongahela River
- Locale: North Versailles, Pennsylvania and Duquesne, Pennsylvania
- Other name(s): Union Railroad Hot Metal Bridge

Characteristics
- Design: Truss bridge
- Longest span: 378 feet (115 m)
- Clearance below: 55.2 feet (16.8 m)

History
- Opened: 1898

The Union Railroad Port Perry Bridge is a truss bridge that carries the Pennsylvania Union Railroad across the Monongahela River between Duquesne, Pennsylvania and the former town site of Port Perry in North Versailles, Pennsylvania. Industrial pipelines adorn the bridge, conveying coke oven gas produced at U.S. Steel's Clairton Coke Works to the company's Edgar Thomson Steel Works near the north end of the bridge for use as fuel.
