= Union Railroad 0-10-2 =

Steam locomotive class

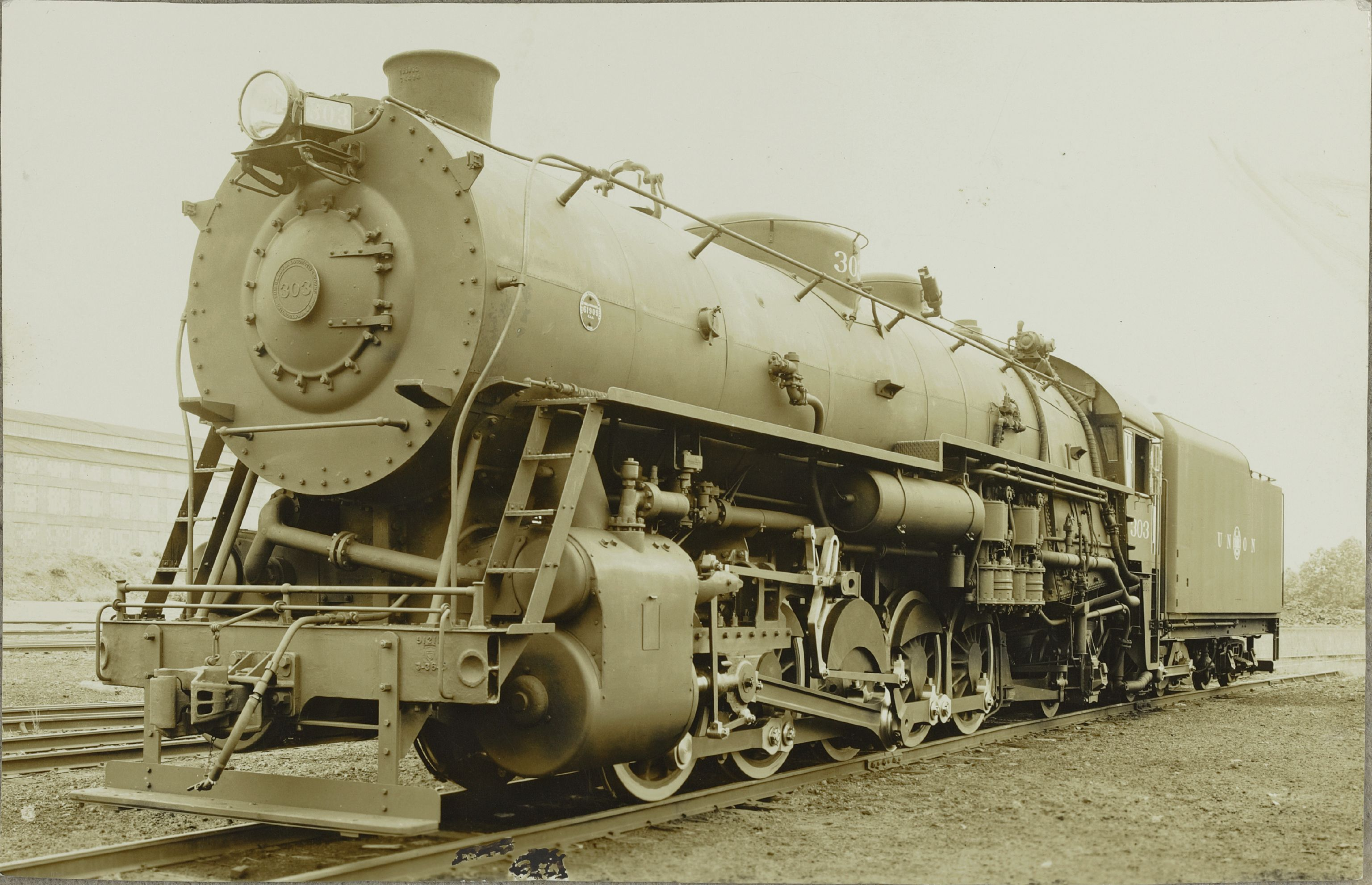
Type and origin
- Power type: Steam
- Builder: Baldwin Locomotive Works
- Serial number: 61907–61911, 62059–62062,
- Build date: 1936–1939
- Total produced: 10
Specifications
- Configuration
  - Whyte: 0-10-2
  - UIC: E1′
- Gauge: 4 ft 8 1/2 in (1,435 mm)
- Driver dia.: 61 in (1,549 mm)
- Adhesive weight: 343,930 lb (156.0 tonnes)
- Loco weight: 404,400 lb (183.4 tonnes)
- Total weight: 644,510 lb (292.3 tonnes)
- Fuel type: Coal
- Fuel capacity: 28,000 lb (12.7 tonnes)
- Water cap.: 12,000 US gal (45,000 L; 10,000 imp gal)
- Boiler pressure: 260 lbf/in^{2} (1.79 MPa)
- Cylinders: Two
- Cylinder size: 28 in × 32 in (711 mm × 813 mm)
- Valve gear: Walschaerts
Performance figures
- Tractive effort: Loco: 90,900 lbf (404.3 kN), Tender booster: 17,150 lbf (76.29 kN)
Career
- Operators: Union Railroad, Duluth, Missabe and Iron Range
- Class: URR: U-108b; DMIR: S7
- Numbers: URR 301-310; DM&IR 601-609
- Retired: URR: 1949; DM&IR: 1958–1963
- Disposition: One preserved, remainder scrapped

Ten Union Railroad 0-10-2 steam locomotives were built in 1936–1939 by the Baldwin Locomotive Works. These were the only 0-10-2 locomotives ever built in the United States and this purchase gave the name "Union" to this type.

The Union Railroad was a switching and transfer line owned by U.S. Steel, serving a number of plants in the area and connecting with six trunk line railroads. Operation was only at low speed, thus a leading truck's stability was not required. The intent was to eliminate helper requirements on grades, and thus a locomotive larger than the Union's previous switchers and 2-8-0 "Consolidations" was needed. Ten driving wheels allowed the application of sufficient tractive effort within the axle load limits of the line, and the requirement for a large firebox and plentiful steam-raising ability necessitated the trailing truck. To increase tractive effort still further, a booster engine was fitted to the leading tender truck. The unusual wheel arrangement was also a result of the turntable restrictions on the total wheel base.

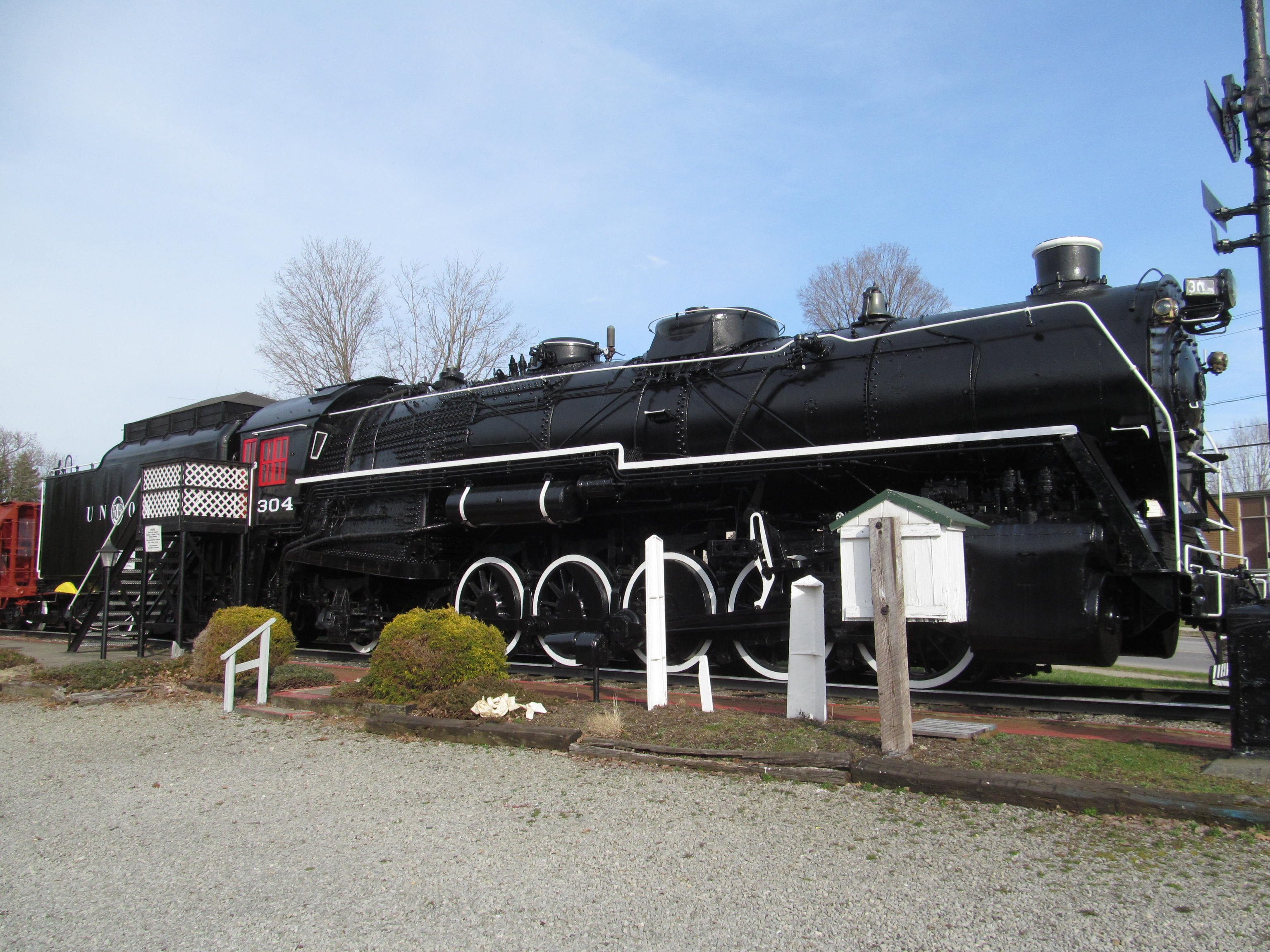
No. 304 on display in Greenville, Pennsylvania.

Upon dieselization of the Union in 1949, nine of the locomotives were sold to fellow U.S. Steel railroad the Duluth, Missabe and Iron Range, where they served until 1962. 304 survives as a static exhibit at Greenville, Pennsylvania.
