= Clairton–Glassport Bridge =

Bridge in Allegheny County, Pennsylvania, U.S.

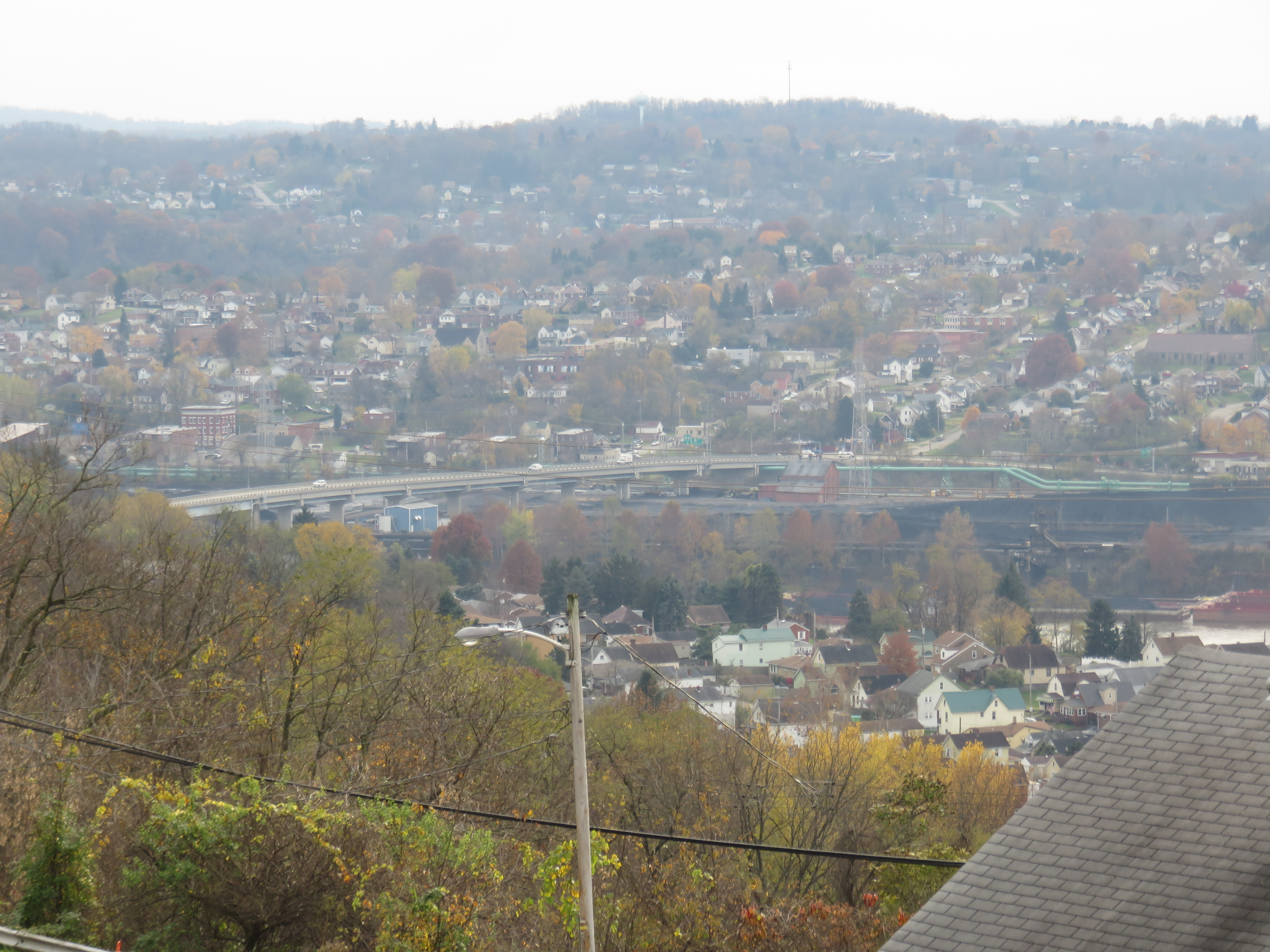
- Coordinates: 40.3131°N 79.8870°W
- Carries: 2 lanes of traffic and USBR 50
- Crosses: Monongahela River
- Locale: Glassport, Pennsylvania, and Clairton, Pennsylvania
- Official name: Senator Edward P. Zemprelli Bridge
- Other name(s): Clairton Bridge, Glassport Bridge
- Maintained by: PennDOT
- ID number: 02-2038-0010-0140

Characteristics
- Design: Welded girder with bolted splice plates
- Total length: 2,890 feet (880 m)
- Longest span: 385.6 feet (118 m)
- Piers in water: 2

History
- Opened: March 2, 1987

Location
- Interactive map of Clairton–Glassport Bridge

The Clairton–Glassport Bridge, officially the Senator Edward P. Zemprelli Bridge is a girder bridge that carries vehicular traffic across the Monongahela River between Glassport, Pennsylvania, and Clairton, Pennsylvania.

It was opened on March 2, 1987, replacing a 1928 arch bridge that stood on the same site. The structure also passes over portions of the U.S. Steel Clairton Coke Works, the largest coke producing facility in the United States.
