= Walter Cooper (scientist) =

American chemist

- Born: July 18, 1928 (age 97); Clairton, Pennsylvania, U.S.
- Occupation(s): Chemist, research scientist Regent of the State of New York
- Spouse: Helen Cooper (died 2005)
- Children: 2
- Parent(s): Luda and Alonzo Cooper

Walter Cooper (born July 18, 1928, in Clairton, Pennsylvania) is an American scientist, humanitarian, activist, and educator. Primarily a research scientist, he was also heavily involved in civil rights work both in Rochester, New York and in Mali.

== Education ==
Cooper's parents, Alonzo and Luda Cooper, were strong proponents of education, and Cooper often said "Not to educate a child is the worst form of child abuse." He graduated from Clairton High School in 1946, where he was a star football player; he was named All Monongahela Valley. His friend Dan Towler, who had played high school football at nearby Donora, Pennsylvania, convinced Cooper to join him at Washington & Jefferson College. He earned a scholarship and played for the Washington & Jefferson Presidents football team. While there, he majored in chemistry and minored in physics and math, graduating in with a degree in Bachelor of Science from Washington and Jefferson College in 1950.

He originally attempted to enter industry, but he soon realized that the corporate world was demanding more of black professionals, and he decided to pursue a higher degree. He briefly attended Howard University. In 1956, he became the first African-American to earn a PhD in physical chemistry from the University of Rochester. Cooper often said "I became a scientist because I did not see any black scientists. I looked around and I saw black doctors, black lawyers, but no black scientists. I chose that as a challenge."

== Career ==
Cooper was hired by Eastman Kodak as a research scientist in 1956. Starting out as a research chemist, he was promoted successively to senior research chemist, research associate and technical associate. In 1985, he was named manager of the office of technical communications, overseeing the publications and technical reports of 2,300 scientific and research personnel. In addition, he managed the Office of Research Innovation. During his career, Cooper published a wide array of scholarly papers in the fields of chemistry and physical chemistry and became the holder of three patents. He retired from Eastman Kodak in 1986.

In 1988, he was appointed to the board of regents of the New York State. In 2003, he left the board and became a regent emeritus.

== Civil rights activities ==
=== Rochester, New York ===
A man of the times, Cooper was heavily involved in community development and civil rights issues, especially educational opportunities and motivation. There was a great deal of social turmoil present in Rochester, as shown by the 1964 Rochester Race Riots. Cooper served the National Association for the Advancement of Colored People (NAACP) as their Rochester branch president. He co-founded the Rochester branch of the Urban League in 1965, continuing to serve on the board of directors into the 1970s. He was also a board member of the Baden Street Settlement, a non-profit organization working with northeast Rochester residents to improve their quality of life.

When the Economic Opportunity Act of 1964 was passed, Cooper took a leave of absence from Eastman Kodak to help form an anti-poverty agency in Rochester called Action for a Better Community, Inc or ABC. He served as the associate director for two years, then as executive director. The organization established a local version of the national Head Start Program, along with other aid programs.

=== Mali ===
Cooper established Rochester's Sister City program with Bamako, Mali in 1975. As part of the program he worked with Rochester Institute of Technology to establish scholarships for students from Bamako. Due to his work, he was named a Knight of the National Order of Mali in 1981.

== Family ==
His wife, Helen, who was also a scientist and worked for Kodak prior to Cooper joining, died in January 2005. They had two adult sons.

== Recognition ==
In 1975, Cooper was elected to the board of trustees of Washington & Jefferson College.

In 2005, SUNY Geneseo granted Cooper an honorary Doctor of Humane Letters.

In 2008, Cooper received the Frederick Douglass Medal from the University of Rochester in recognition of his lifetime involvement in civil rights.

His papers are archived at the University of Rochester.

In 2010, Rochester City School number 10 was named the Dr. Walter Cooper Academy School #10 in his honor. The school emphasizes research and interactive learning, the methodology Cooper promoted during his time as a Regent of the State of New York and as the education committee chair of the Urban League of Rochester.

In 2020, Washington & Jefferson College renamed first-year dormitory Beau Hall to Cooper Hall in Cooper's honor.
