= McKeesport Connecting Railroad Bridge =

Railroad bridge in Pennsylvania, United States

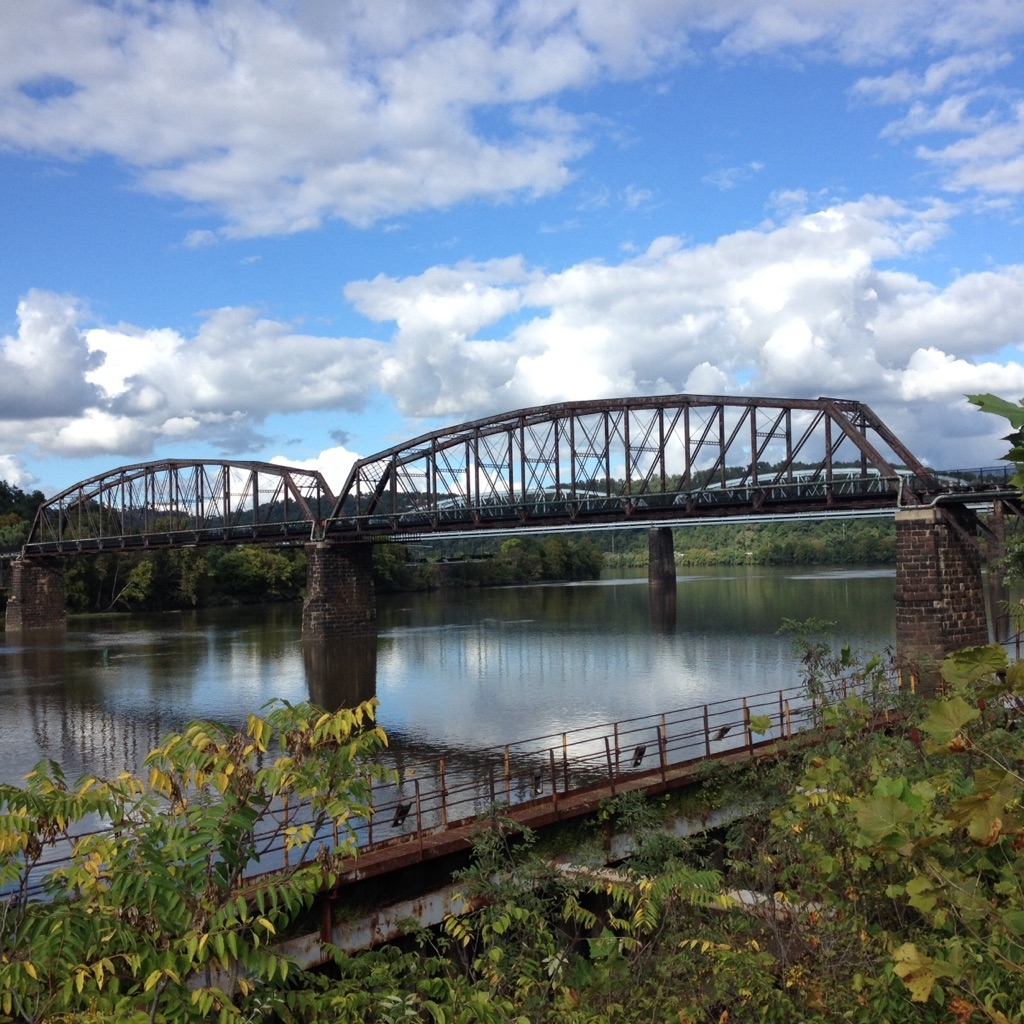
- Coordinates: 40.3569°N 79.8474°W
- Carries: Great Allegheny Passage
- Crosses: Monongahela River
- Locale: McKeesport, Pennsylvania and West Mifflin, Pennsylvania
- Other name(s): Riverton Bridge

Characteristics
- Design: Truss bridge
- Longest span: 324 feet (99 m)
- Clearance below: 49.2 feet (15.0 m)

History
- Opened: 1890

The McKeesport Connecting Railroad Bridge, also known as the Riverton Bridge, is a bridge that spans the Monongahela River between McKeesport, and Duquesne, Pennsylvania.

== History ==
The bridge connected the U.S. Steel Duquesne Works and the National Tube Works in McKeesport and was used by Pennsylvania Union Railroad which is owned and operated by Transtar, Inc., the railroad division of U.S. Steel. In the late 1950s/early 1960s the large blast furnace Dorothy (named for the U.S. Steel president's wife) was built to supply steel to both plants, replacing many smaller furnaces. In the 1980s, during the decline of the American steel industry, both mills were closed and razed. The Bridge remained unused for several years, until 2007, when it became part of the Great Allegheny Passage bike trail from the C&O Canal Towpath in Cumberland MD to Pittsburgh PA. The bridge is next to the McKeesport – Duquesne vehicular bridge.

== See also ==
- List of crossings of the Monongahela River
