= 0-10-2 =

Locomotive wheel arrangement

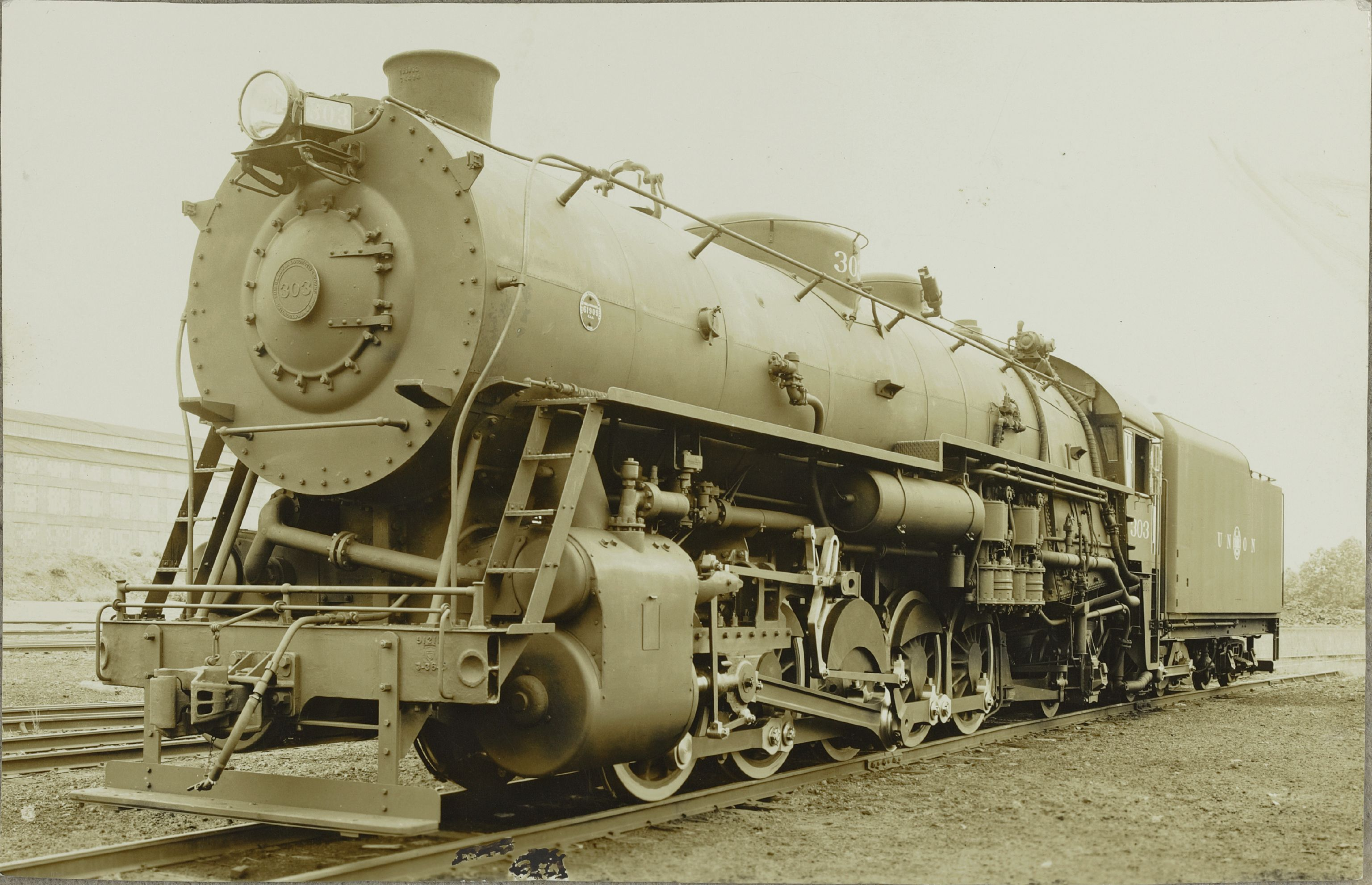

Under the Whyte notation for the classification of steam locomotives, 0-10-2 represents the wheel arrangement of no leading wheels, ten powered and coupled driving wheels on five axles, and two trailing wheels on one axle (usually in a trailing truck).

Other equivalent classifications are:

UIC classification: E1′ (also known as German classification and Italian classification)
French classification: 051
Turkish classification: 56
Swiss classification: 5/6
Russian classification: 0-5-1

== United States ==
In the US, this type is known as the Union after the only US railroad to have new locomotives built in this arrangement. These were ten 0-10-2s built for the Union Railroad in the Pittsburgh, Pennsylvania area. They were used as heavy duty transfer locomotives rather than switchers. In Greenville, Pennsylvania, one is on static display lettered for the Duluth Missabe and Iron Range Railway #604 (Upon dieselization, the Union RR sold all of theirs to the DM&IR) .

The Chicago & North Western Railway converted two 2-10-2 locomotives formerly owned by subsidiary Chicago, St. Paul, Minneapolis & Omaha into 0-10-2 locomotives in 1944. They were classified J-1 both before and after conversion. One was scrapped in 1950 and the other in 1953.

== Europe ==
In Germany, a number of narrow gauge tank locomotives were built with an 0-10-2 configuration. All used some form of articulated drive that allowed the outer driving axles to move sideways or radially to negotiate curves. An example was a group of locomotives built for the narrow gauge lines of Bosnia that utilised the Klose System for an articulated drive.
