= Clairton, Pennsylvania =

City in Pennsylvania, US

- City
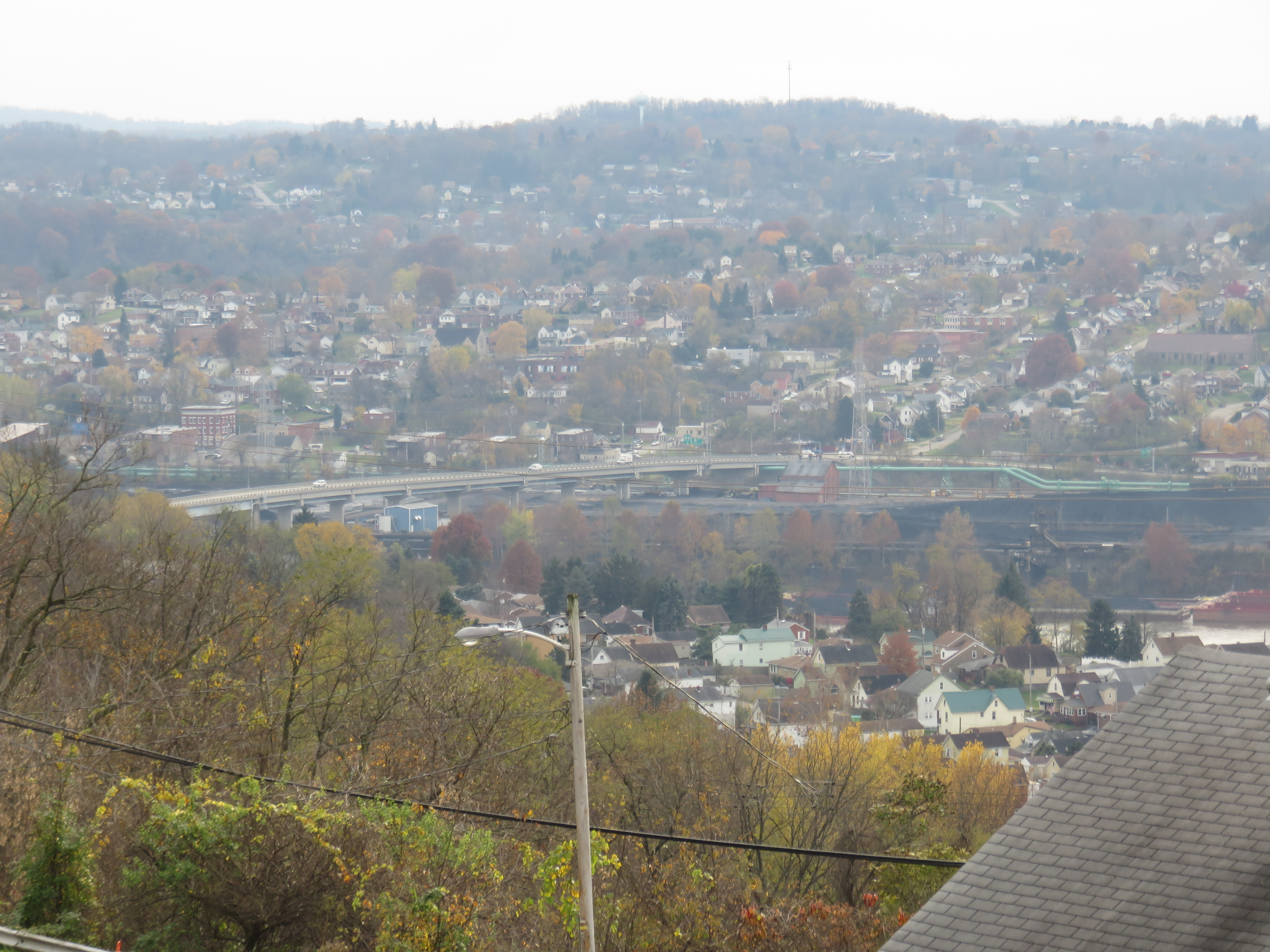
- Clairton viewed from across the Monongahela River

- Seal
- Nickname: City of Prayer
- Interactive map of Clairton, Pennsylvania
- Location within Pennsylvania Location within the United States
- Coordinates: 40.296656°N 79.889026°W
- Country: United States
- State: Pennsylvania
- County: Allegheny
- Incorporated: April 12, 1903 (borough); January 1, 1922 (city)

Government
  - Mayor: James A. Cerqua

Area
  - Total: 2.995 sq mi (7.757 km^{2})
  - Land: 2.769 sq mi (7.172 km^{2})
  - Water: 0.226 sq mi (0.585 km^{2}) 7.55%
- Elevation: 850 ft (259 m)

Population (2020)
  - Total: 6,181
  - Estimate (2024): 5,945
  - Density: 2,147/sq mi (828.9/km^{2})
- Time zone: UTC–5 (Eastern (EST))
  - Summer (DST): UTC–4 (EDT)
- ZIP Code: 15025
- Area code: 412
- FIPS code: 42-13704
- GNIS feature ID: 1214783
- Sales tax: 7.0%
- Website: cityofclairton.com

Clairton is a city in Allegheny County, Pennsylvania, United States. It is located along the Monongahela River and is part of the Pittsburgh metropolitan area. The population was 6,181 at the 2020 census, and was estimated to be 5,945 in 2024. Under Pennsylvania legal classifications for local governments, Clairton is considered a third-class city. It is home to the Clairton Coke Works operated by U.S. Steel, the largest coke manufacturing facility in North America.

== History ==
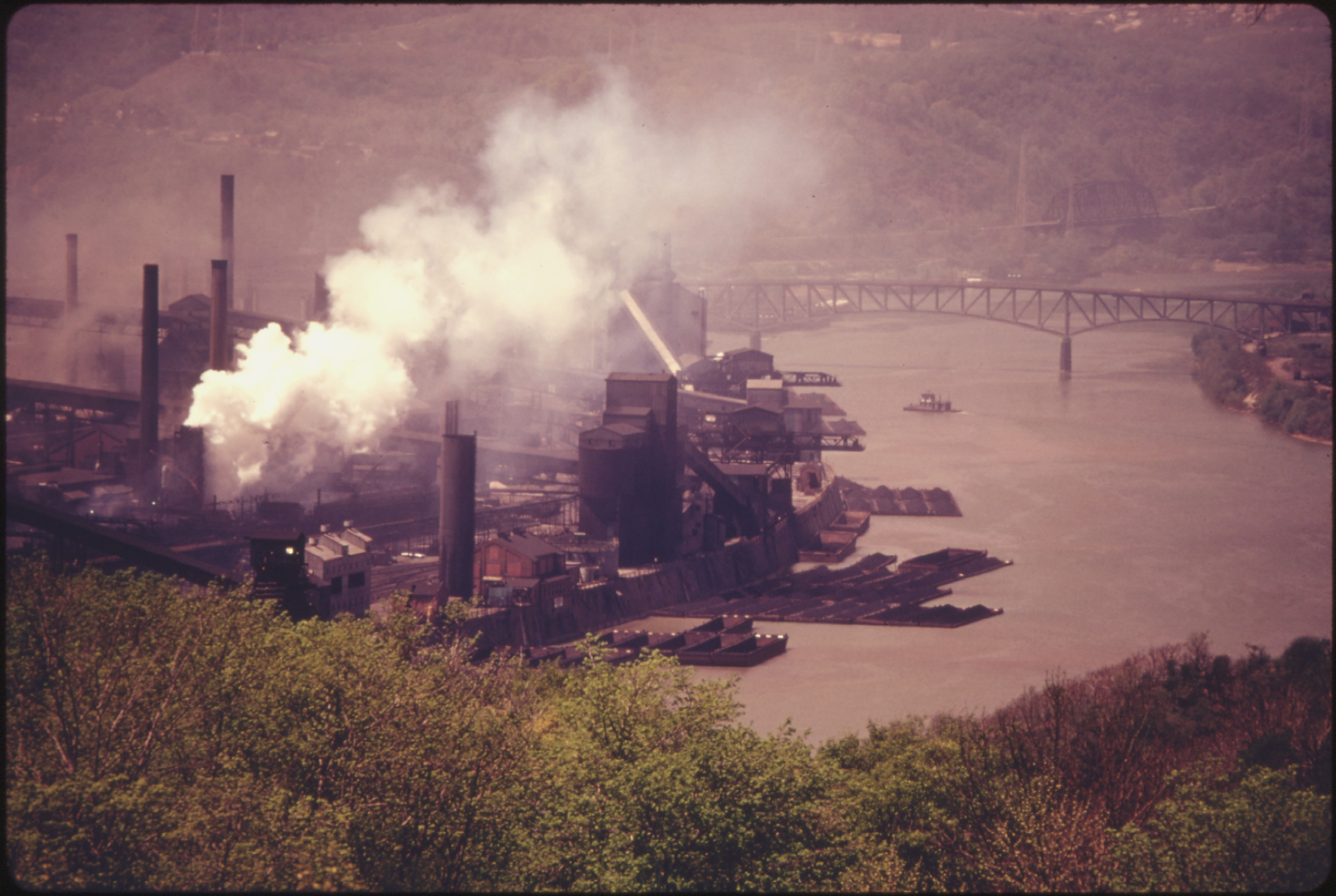
The Clairton Coke Works in 1973

External audio
- Clairton, Hometown Pride Still Alive in a Declining Steel Town, 14:13, Grapple, Keystone Crossroads

Clairton's existence dates to just after the turn of the 20th century, when the Crucible Steel Company acquired a large tract along the west side of the Monongahela River, approximately 13 miles (21 km) south of Pittsburgh. Soon after, the Carnegie Steel Company (later U.S. Steel) built an integrated steel mill and coke production facility, which eventually became one of the world's largest.

The site had more than 1,000 acres (4.0 km^{2}) of level land suitable for a large industrial complex. On April 12, 1903, Clairton was incorporated as a borough, and on January 1, 1922, Clairton was incorporated as a City of the Third Class with a population of approximately 11,000. This incorporation was prompted by industry, which was taxed by the three boroughs - Clairton, Wilson and North Clairton - which were chartered separately prior to the incorporation of the City of Clairton.

During the next several decades, growth and advancement indicated a thriving city. As the steel mill and coke production facilities expanded, the population of Clairton grew. Clairton took on a life of its own, including a business district and educational, religious, and cultural facilities. The city peaked in the late 1950s and has been in decline since.

In the late 1950s, Clairton High School (CHS) had a large student body, and the city had a "feeder" system of public and parochial elementary schools. The CHS student body was soon siphoned off, however, by new schools in Elizabeth Borough, Snowden Township, and Jefferson Borough. During the mid-1950s and into the 1960s, CHS was a Class AAA competitor in the formidable Western Pennsylvania Interscholastic Athletic League (WPIAL), playing against high schools in other mill towns up and down the Monongahela River Valley.

The city was the setting for the movie The Deer Hunter (1978), although none of the movie was actually filmed there (other mill towns in the Monongahela River Valley and elsewhere in the tri-state area were used).

With the decline of the steel industry in the 1980s, Clairton began to experience severe problems in its employment and tax base, which spurred a major economic shock to the community. In 1988, Clairton was designated a distressed municipality by Pennsylvania's Department of Community Affairs (DCA). Pursuant to Act 47 of 1987 (the Financially Distressed Municipalities Act), DCA commissioned the development of a recovery plan for Clairton. By 1988, the Clairton School District had consolidated its entire system into a single building (a remodeled version of the high school) and closed its other schools. Clairton High now competes at the Class A level in the WPIAL. The high school football team has had national prominence for recent success. In November 2015, Clairton left Act 47 status.

== Geography ==
According to the United States Census Bureau, the city has a total area of 2.995 square miles (7.76 km^{2}), of which 2.769 square miles (7.17 km^{2}) is land and 0.226 square miles (0.59 km^{2}) (7.55%) is water. A majority of Clairton is bordered by land with Jefferson Hills, with a short border with West Mifflin to the north. Across the Monongahela River, Clairton runs adjacent to Glassport to the north and northeast (direct link via Clairton-Glassport Bridge) and follows the curve down the river with Lincoln from the northeast to the southeast.

== Demographics ==
Historical population
Census	Pop.	Note	%±
1910	3,326		—
1920	6,264		88.3%
1930	15,291		144.1%
1940	16,381		7.1%
1950	19,652		20.0%
1960	18,389		−6.4%
1970	15,051		−18.2%
1980	12,188		−19.0%
1990	9,656		−20.8%
2000	8,491		−12.1%
2010	6,796		−20.0%
2020	6,181		−9.0%
2024 (est.)	5,945		−3.8%
U.S. Decennial Census; 2020 Census

As of the 2023 American Community Survey, there are 2,635 estimated households in Clairton with an average of 2.30 persons per household. The city has a median household income of $39,884. Approximately 29.9% of the city's population lives at or below the poverty line. Clairton has an estimated 53.7% employment rate, with 24.0% of the population holding a bachelor's degree or higher and 91.9% holding a high school diploma.

=== Racial and ethnic composition ===
Clairton, Pennsylvania – racial and ethnic composition Note: the US Census treats Hispanic/Latino as an ethnic category. This table excludes Latinos from the racial categories and assigns them to a separate category. Hispanics/Latinos may be of any race.
Race / ethnicity (NH = non-Hispanic)	Pop. 2000	Pop. 2010	Pop. 2020	% 2000	% 2010	% 2020
White alone (NH)	5,840	3,924	2,988	68.78%	57.74%	48.34%
Black or African American alone (NH)	2,395	2,533	2,544	28.21%	37.27%	41.16%
Native American or Alaska Native alone (NH)	7	6	19	0.08%	0.09%	0.31%
Asian alone (NH)	14	19	34	0.16%	0.28%	0.55%
Pacific Islander alone (NH)	0	0	0	0.00%	0.00%	0.00%
Other race alone (NH)	15	18	42	0.18%	0.26%	0.68%
Mixed race or multiracial (NH)	158	188	382	1.86%	2.77%	6.18%
Hispanic or Latino (any race)	62	108	172	0.73%	1.59%	2.78%
Total	8,491	6,796	6,181	100.00%	100.00%	100.00%

=== 2020 census ===
As of the 2020 census, there were 6,181 people, 2,868 households, and 1,566 families residing in the city. The population density was 2,232.2 inhabitants per square mile (861.9/km^{2}) and the housing density was 1,281.7 per square mile (494.9/km^{2}). The median age was 41.9 years, with 21.5% of residents under the age of 18 and 20.9% of residents 65 years of age or older. For every 100 females there were 85.0 males, and for every 100 females age 18 and over there were 77.3 males age 18 and over.

There were 2,868 households in Clairton, of which 24.1% had children under the age of 18 living in them. Of all households, 23.4% were married-couple households, 22.3% were households with a male householder and no spouse or partner present, and 46.3% were households with a female householder and no spouse or partner present. About 38.3% of all households were made up of individuals and 16.8% had someone living alone who was 65 years of age or older.

There were 3,549 housing units, of which 19.2% were vacant. The homeowner vacancy rate was 2.5% and the rental vacancy rate was 16.9%.

100.0% of residents lived in urban areas, while 0.0% lived in rural areas.

Racial composition as of the 2020 census
Race	Number	Percent
White	3,021	48.9%
Black or African American	2,581	41.8%
American Indian and Alaska Native	20	0.3%
Asian	39	0.6%
Native Hawaiian and Other Pacific Islander	0	0.0%
Some other race	81	1.3%
Two or more races	439	7.1%
Hispanic or Latino (of any race)	172	2.8%

=== 2010 census ===
As of the 2010 census, there were 6,796 people, 3,127 households, and _ families residing in the city. The population density was 2,437.4 inhabitants per square mile (941.1/km^{2}). There were 3,889 housing units at an average density of 1,393.9 per square mile (538.2/km^{2}). The racial makeup of the city was 58.46% White, 37.63% African American, 0.09% Native American, 0.29% Asian, 0.00% Pacific Islander, 0.40% from some other races and 3.13% from two or more races. Hispanic or Latino people of any race were 1.59% of the population.

=== 2000 census ===
As of the 2000 census, there were 8,491 people, 3,710 households, and 2,203 families residing in the city. The population density was 3,072.3 inhabitants per square mile (1,186.2/km^{2}). There were 4,350 housing units at an average density of 1,573.9 per square mile (607.7/km^{2}). The racial makeup of the city was 69.12% White, 28.32% African American, 0.11% Native American, 0.16% Asian, 0.00% Pacific Islander, 0.28% from some other races and 2.00% from two or more races. Hispanic or Latino people of any race were 0.73% of the population.

In terms of ancestry, 17.5% were of Italian, 9.8% German, 9.8% Irish, 6.7% Slovak and 5.0% English ancestry according to the census. 96.4% spoke English, 1.3% Italian and 1.1% French as their first language.

There were 3,710 households, out of which 23.6% had children under the age of 18 living with them, 34.3% were married couples living together, 19.8% had a female householder with no husband present, and 40.6% were non-families. Of these households, 36.4% consisted of individuals, and 18.5% had someone living alone who was 65 or older. The average household had 2.25 people and the average family size was 2.92.

The population was spread out, with 22.1% under the age of 18, 7.2% from 18 to 24, 25.0% from 25 to 44, 21.6% from 45 to 64, and 24.0% who were 65 or older. The median age was 42. For every 100 females, there were 83.7 males. For every 100 females 18 and over, there were 78.3 males.

The median income for a household in the city was $25,596, and the median income for a family was $31,539. Males had a median income of $29,399 versus $21,743 for females. The per capita income for the city was $14,608. About 15.4% of families and 19.5% of the population were below the poverty line, including 32.9% of those under age 18 and 14.0% of those age 65 or over.

== Parks and recreation ==
The Montour Trail, a recreational rail-trail, extends from Clairton to Coraopolis, Pennsylvania.

== Government and politics ==
Presidential elections results
Year	Republican	Democratic	Third parties
2024	32% 836	66% 1,726	2% 35
2020	32% 915	66% 1,857	2% 38
2016	29% 813	69% 1,924	2% 66
2012	23% 706	76% 2,292	1% 21

As of 2026, the mayor of Clairton is James A. Cerqua.

== In popular culture ==
The city was the setting for the movie The Deer Hunter (1978), the steel town where the American characters live. None of the movie was actually filmed there; other mill towns in the Monongahela River Valley and elsewhere in the tri-state area were used. Even the opening scene, which features a large sign saying "Welcome to Clairton, City of Prayer," was shot in Mingo Junction, Ohio. The phrasing on the sign is based on smaller signs posted at the city's boundaries during the mid-1960s as a response to the Supreme Court's 1963 ban on sponsored school prayer.

Much of the 1979 Marvel comic book Rom: Spaceknight is set in a fictional version of Clairton, located in West Virginia instead of Pennsylvania. In 2011, former Marvel Editor-in-Chief Jim Shooter explained that the change in location was made to benefit the story.

== Notable people ==
- Nancy Y. Bekavac, President of Scripps College
- Benny Benack, trumpet player
- Tyler Boyd, NFL player
- Walter Cooper, scientist
- Reginald B. Desiderio, Medal of Honor recipient
- Marva Josie, jazz vocalist
- George Kosana, actor, played the sheriff in Night of the Living Dead
- Lance Parrish, MLB catcher 1977–1995, chiefly for the Detroit Tigers
- Ron Lancaster, Canadian Football League Quarterback 1963 - 1978, Saskatchewan Roughriders
