= Clairton Coke Works =

Coking factory in Pennsylvania, U.S.

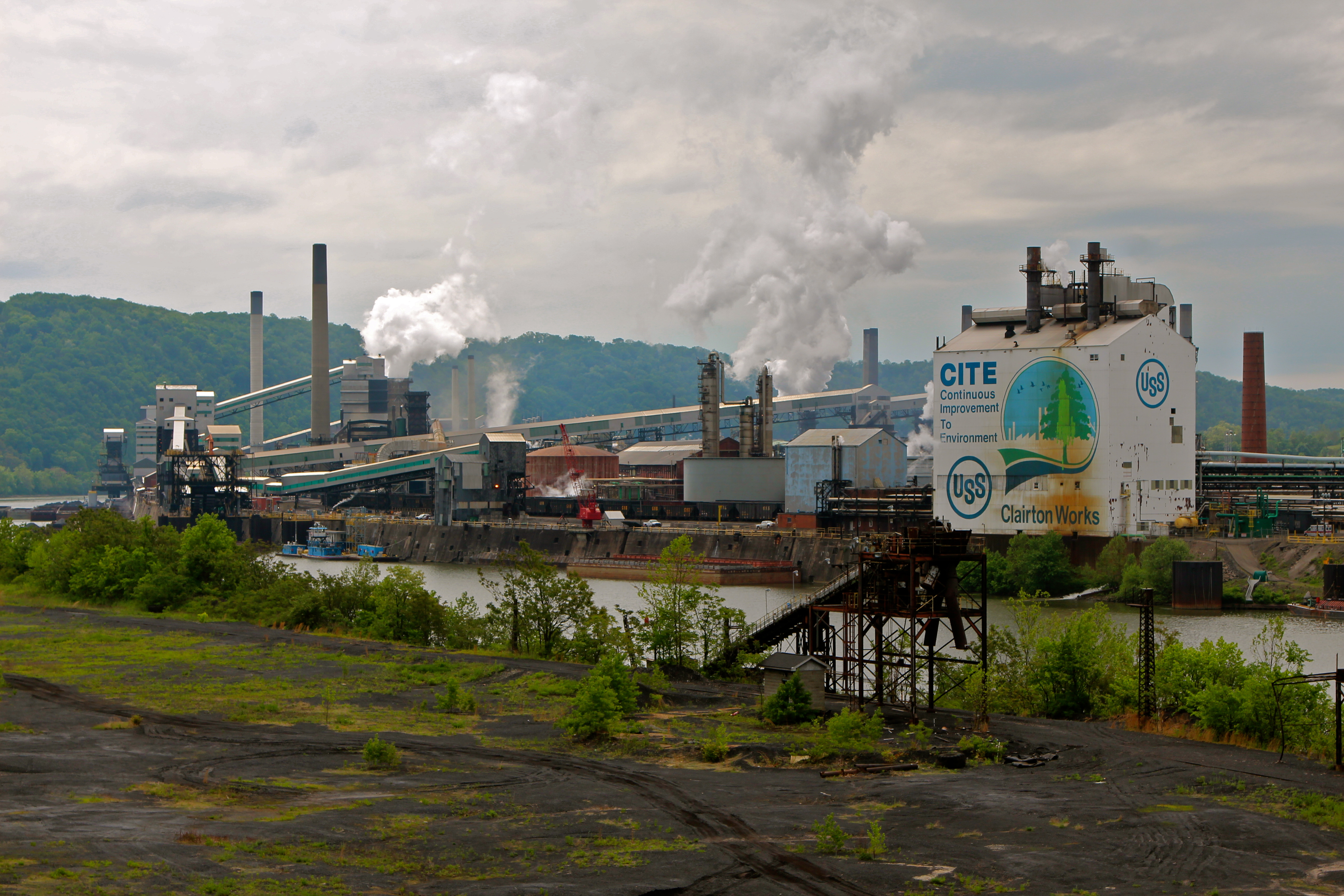
- Clairton Coke Works in 2013
- Built: 1916
- Location: Clairton, Pennsylvania
- Coordinates: 40.297°N 79.871°W
- Industry: Steelmaking
- Style: Coking factory
- Owner: U.S. Steel

Clairton Coke Works is a coking factory in Clairton, Pennsylvania (10 miles south of Pittsburgh), on the Monongahela River. Owned by U.S. Steel, it is the largest coking operation in North America or possibly the world. The 392-acre facility has operated since the beginning of the 20th century and is capable of producing 4.7 million tons of coke annually in its nine batteries. Its workforce over its century-long history has fluctuated with the steel industry's booms and busts; as of 2024 it employs about 1,200 people. The plant is one of the major sources of air pollution in Allegheny County.

== History ==
=== Early history ===
Steelmaking in Clairton dates back to at least 1903, when the newly-formed U.S. Steel purchased a half-interest in the Crucible Steel Company of America's furnace and steel factory in the city. The broader region was the epicenter of steelmaking in the United States, largely because of the Pittsburgh seam, an extensive deposit of high-quality coal. Clairton's position on the Monongahela allowed for both rail and barge transportation.

Steelmaking requires large amounts of coke, which is produced from coal by heating it in the absence of air. This was traditionally done in rudimentary beehive ovens on-site at coal mines. In 1910s, the industry began to prefer by-product ovens. These more advanced ovens capture a variety of industrially useful chemicals released by the coking process, like coal tar, ammonium sulfate and benzole.

In 1916, U.S. Steel opened its Clairton Coke Works, a $18,000,000 by-product plant. It was the first full by-product plant in the region and easily the largest in the United States with 1,500 ovens. The plant grew rapidly, adding hundreds more coke ovens built by Koppers. In 1919 the plant was processing 12,500 tons of coal every 24 hours.

By the 1920s, U.S. Steel had abandoned the use of beehive ovens on-site at mines, instead centralizing its coke production at the Clairton works. Because it is much cheaper to transport coal by barge downstream than by rail, this caused many coal mines to no longer be economically viable due to their location. A large number of mines in the Pittsburgh seam were closed with coal still in them, and allowed to flood.

=== Labor ===
Following the passage of the National Industrial Recovery Act of 1933, which guaranteed collective bargaining rights, steel industry labor unions grew dramatically in size and number. Employees organized widespread strikes with support from the Amalgamated Association of Iron and Steel Workers and United Mine Workers of America, fighting for local union recognition and contracts. On September 26, 1933, about half of Clairton's workers joined hundreds of coal miners in an around-the-clock strike. The work stoppage was denounced by leads of the national unions, who feared that they would undo the progress they had made with President Roosevelt and others. The workers persisted nonetheless. The miners signed a contract on October 30, but the steelworkers were unsuccessful.

=== Worker safety ===
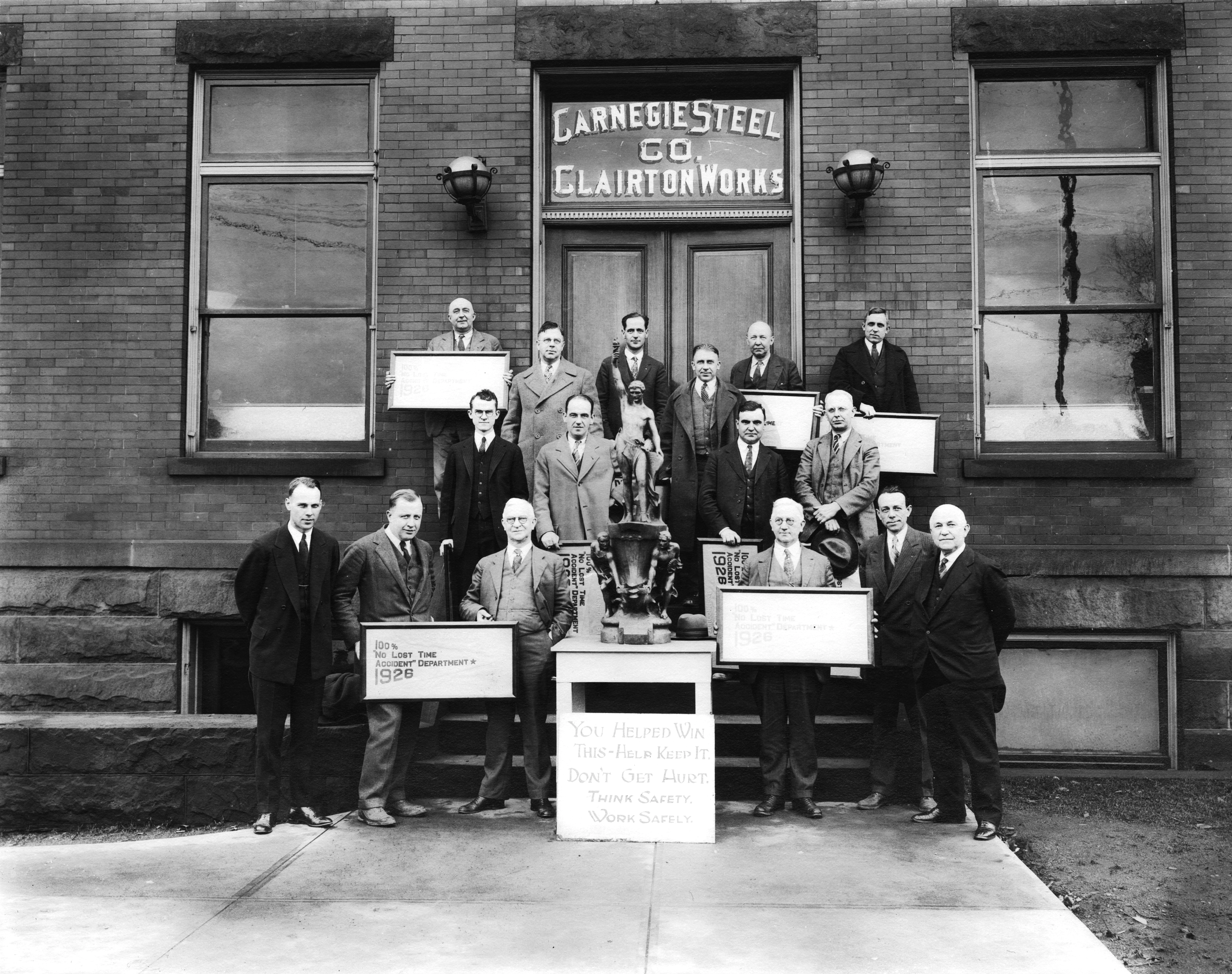
Workers at Clairton Works receiving a safety award in 1926

In the 1960s, it started to be understood that the gases from the coke operation were causing lung cancer and other health problems in workers, but it had not been demonstrated clearly in scientific studies.

A University of Pittsburgh study funded by the National Cancer Institute found 2.5x higher cancer rates for coke workers in Allegheny County than other steelworkers. The increase in cancer mortality was primarily observed in non-white workers. Since different areas of the coking operation had substantially different racial makeup, the authors believed that specific environments in the plant were causing cancer. They found 5 to 10x higher rates among the predominantly black workers at the top of ovens, where fumes were most concentrated. For people that worked at the top of the ovens for at least 15 years, 28% died of lung cancer. This made a strong case that the coking byproducts themselves were carcinogenic.

The Occupational Safety and Health Act was passed by Congress in 1970, establishing OSHA. Clairton union representatives and workers testified about the conditions at the plant at congressional hearings for this act. Coke oven standards were some of the first that OSHA instituted. The standards were somewhat controversial in their strictness, owing to the testimony of workers and epidemiological studies.

=== 1970s pollution regulations ===
The 1970s also brought new environmental regulations. In 1970, new county air quality regulations meant that process water, which was too contaminated to be released into the Monogahela river even with pretreatment, could no longer be used to quench coke. The municipal water treatment authority ALCOSAN would not accept the process water either. The company tried to acquire a variance to violate the regulation, arguing that it was technologically impossible to comply, ceasing operations would harm the local economy, and that there was no evidence that the released gases posed a health hazard. They were unsuccessful in attaining a variance, although the case was referred to a higher court. (Ultimately, the company invested in their own water treatment facilities for process water. By 1977, the plant was treating 2.5 million gallons on-site in a 3.5 acre bacterial system.)

Thus began decades of tense negotiations between the company, local, state, and federal authorities. The Clairton plant repeatedly violated new air pollution regulations. After 33 separate violations in October 1971 alone, the Allegheny County Air Pollution Appeals Board was convinced that U.S. Steel "will delay cleaning up the Clairton Coke Works until it is forced to take action."

==== Consent decree ====
In September 1972, U.S. Steel and Allegheny County entered a legal agreement (a consent decree) to come into compliance with air pollution regulations within 10 years, and to meet weaker standards in the meantime. Days later, the Environmental Protection Agency conducted a surprise inspection of Clairton Coke Works with news media. Mid-Atlantic EPA director Edward Furia described the plant during his media appearance as "Dante's Inferno."

Allegheny county officials alleged that the surprise visit sought to "sabotage" the consent decree. The EPA argued that the consent decree effectively offered the company immunity from new antipollution laws for ten years. The EPA argued that they could never support this clause, as it would be "illegal" and "unconstitutional" under the Clean Air Act. U.S. Steel insisted upon this clause. Newspapers reported that the EPA had issued a 30-day ultimatum for the plant to come into compliance with air standards or be fined $25,000 a day, but EPA officials denied these claims.

Only months later, in March 1973, the Department of Environmental Resources and Allegheny County sued U.S. Steel for 241 violations of the interim standards they had agreed to. Silvestri Silvestri, the judge in the case, found that they had clearly violated the agreement. Instead of fining them, he engaged a technical team to determine whether it was possible for them to comply at all. This action was overturned by a higher Commonwealth Court. Silvestri was accused by the state of favoritism towards the company. The county argued that the company entered the consent decree voluntarily, and should not have done so if it could not comply. Assistant Attorney General Marvin Fein said "U.S. Steel has violated every provision of the consent decree under which they agreed to undertake a cleanup at the coke works."

U.S. Steel invested in a $100 million emissions control program in 1974. However, the State Department of Environmental Resources believed that the expenditure was mostly on maintenance or work that would have been done anyway, not on pollution controls. They sued to get an itemization of the expenses. DER Secretary Maurice K. Goddard called Clairton Coke Works a "national disgrace," and "probably the worst pollution source in the country."

By January 1975, the consent decree seemingly fell apart. U.S. Steel argued that it was impossible to comply as 16 of its officials were subpoenaed to appear before a grand jury initiated by the Justice Department at the behest of the EPA. Environmental groups argued that emission-reducing technology does exist, and that U.S. Steel was already using it at their own plant in Fairfield Alabama. In November of that year, there was a regional "air pollution crisis" concentrated at the plant, which the EPA linked with 14 deaths.

Acrimony continued between the company and regulatory agencies, with the dispute becoming increasingly political. Deputy Administrator of the EPA, John R. Quarles Jr. announced that "U.S. Steel has compiled a record of environmental recalcitrance which is second to none." U.S. Steel ran full-page ads in local papers, declaring "U.S. Steel can't make steel in Pittsburgh without coke from Clairton. Period." Many locals sided with the company, often because of jobs and other economic impact of the factory. A Pittsburgh Post-Gazette editorial called U.S. Steel an "integral part of this community," "like the Pirates and the Steelers."

=== 1980s decline ===
As the 1980s began, the strength of the U.S. dollar meant that imported steel became far cheaper, and U.S. steel producers faced a major decline. U.S. Steel sold off $2.5 billion of assets, including its headquarters building in Pittsburgh. The workforce at Clairton Coke Works, which had been 7,000 strong at the end of the 1970s, was slashed to 4,800 by 1983. In 1985, 1,600 workers were furloughed—more than half the remaining workforce—and by the end of the year, only about 1,100 worked at the plant. The reduced tax revenues were devastating to the city of Clairton, which faced bankruptcy. The city shut off street lights, laid off all 14 of its police officers and its 10 fire fighters (the firefighters continued to work without pay). The layoffs placed additional strain on labor relations. Union officials alleged that U.S. Steel was laying off union workers paid $9/hr. and rehiring them as "consultants" making $3.50 for the same work. A USW strike in 1986 stopped work at the factory as the company attempted to cut wages. Picketers, including union members who had been laid off that year, prevented management from entering or exiting the gates. A negotiator for the company declared that the job- and cost-cutting measures were necessary to compete internationally, saying that "there are not enough seats in the steel-lifeboat for everybody."

Despite the reduced production, the Clairton factory continued to be a major source of pollution. A 1986 amendment to U.S. Superfund laws added "right-to-know" provisions, requiring companies to publish data on releases of toxic pollutants even if the substances are not federally regulated. In the first report in 1987, Clairton Coke Works was responsible for 4.1 million pounds of toxic emissions (of the 22.8 million total across Allegheny County). Prominent emissions included 880,000 pounds of benzene (classified as a carcinogen) and 420,000 pounds of toluene.

In addition to air emissions from regular operations, singular releases from industrial accidents were a common occurrence. In February 1985, pipes broken from freezing temperatures resulted in a discharge of benzene into the Monongahela River. Benzene levels were 100x higher than state limits and detected as far away as Louisville, Kentucky, with leaching continuing for months. Cities along the Ohio River comprising some 3 million people who use the river as a source of drinking water sought to bill U.S. Steel for the cost of cleaning up the contamination.

=== 2025 explosion ===
On August 11, 2025, multiple explosions occurred at the plant. Two U.S. Steel workers were killed and 11 others, including contractors, were injured. An initial explosion occurred at 10:51 am inside a coke battery operating area, inside the reversing room, between the 13th and 15th battery, and multiple secondary explosions were reported afterwards. A fire broke out, but the plant was stable by the afternoon, with the plant and a vehicle damaged. Initially, one worker was reported to be dead and one was missing, but after a search and rescue effort, the missing worker was also later found dead. Ten injured workers were transported to local hospitals (UPMC Mercy and Allegheny Health Network) for care. Many of the injuries were not life-threatening, and five workers were discharged within a few hours.

Allegheny County Health Department officials were monitoring air quality in the area and recommended that residents within one mile stay indoors, but did not detect a change in air quality above federal standards. The order was lifted later in the day.

As of February 2026, the explosion and its cause are still under investigation by the Chemical Safety Board (CSB). Per the Associated Press and Pittsburgh's Public Source:

According to the Chemical Safety Board, the August explosion happened while workers were closing and opening a gas isolation valve in a basement after pumping water into the valve. U.S. Steel’s written procedure did not mention the use of water and a U.S. Steel supervisor directed workers to pump the water, the agency said. Kurt Barshick, U.S. Steel’s vice president of the Mon Valley Works, said during an October presentation to residents in the wake of the August explosion that workers trapped "3,000 PSI water inside of a valve that's rated for 50 PSI." The valve cracked and gas filled the area, Barshick added.

The head of the CSB investigation said the explosion saw a "release of coke oven gas"—which the agency was still investigating—which "contacted an ignition source" and exploded. In December 2025, the CSB said it had identified "potentially unmitigated hazards for workers at Clairton Coke Works that warrant immediate attention."

== Gallery ==
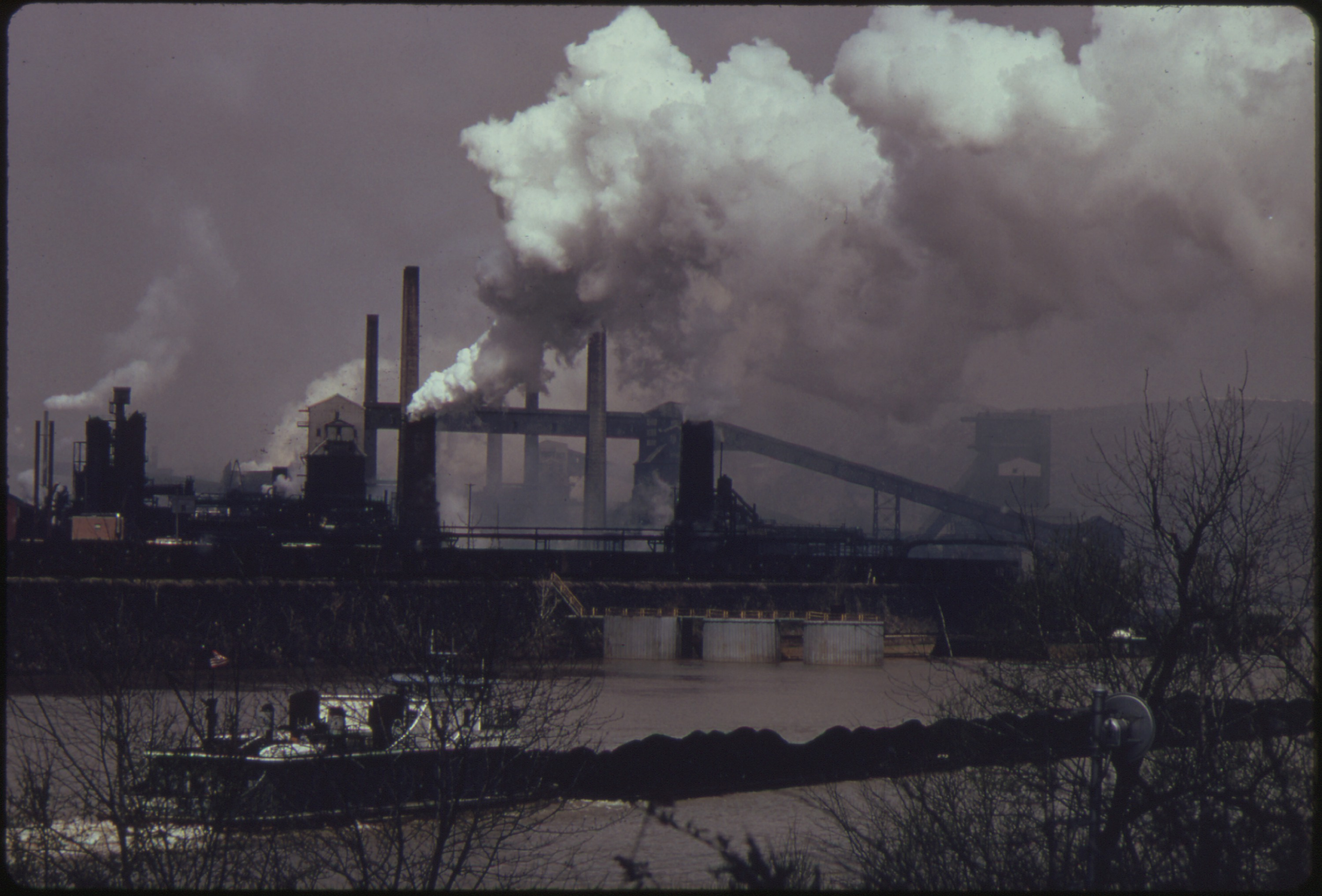
EPA photo showing the factory with barges in the Monongahela, April 1973

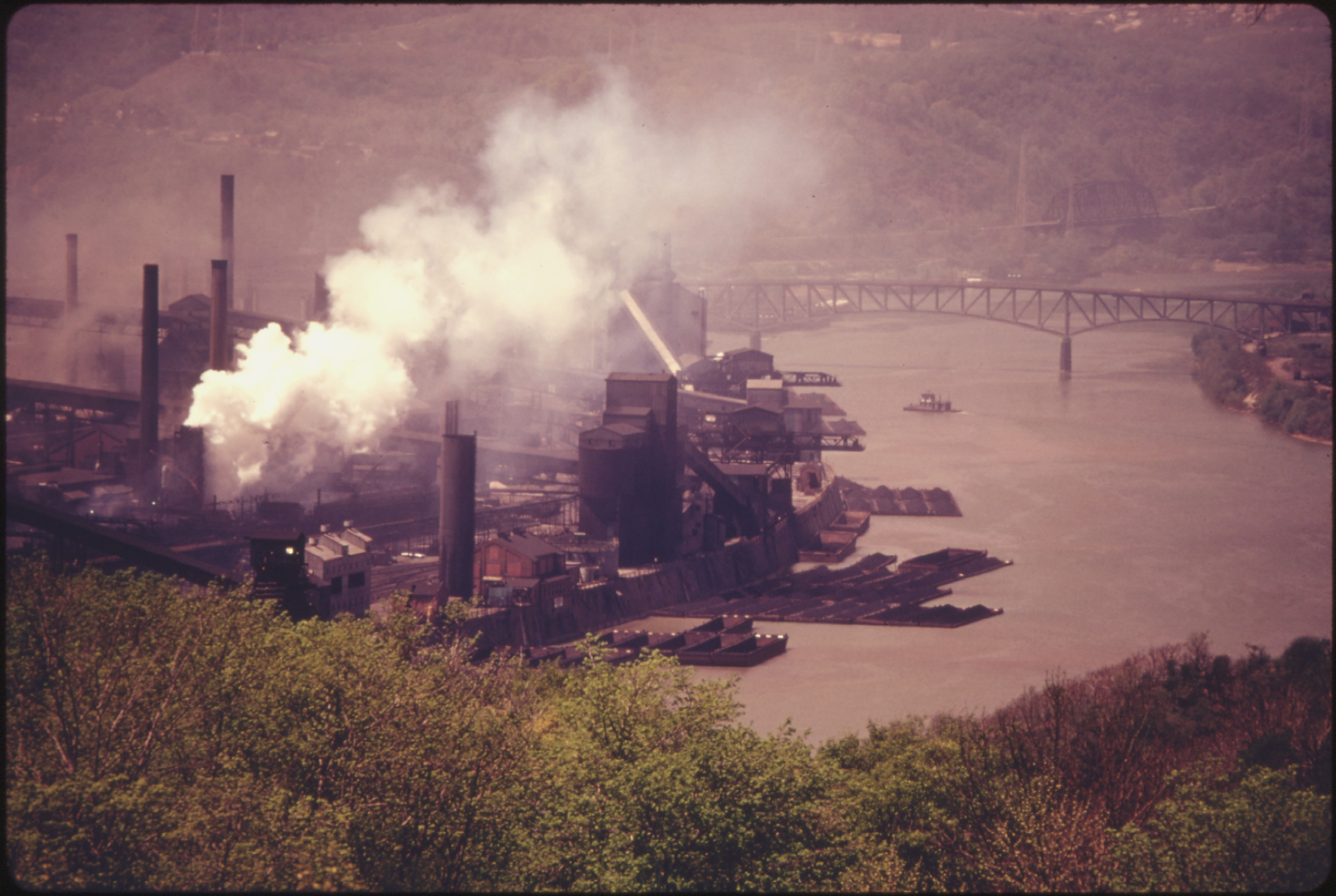
Aerial view of the facility (EPA), May 1973

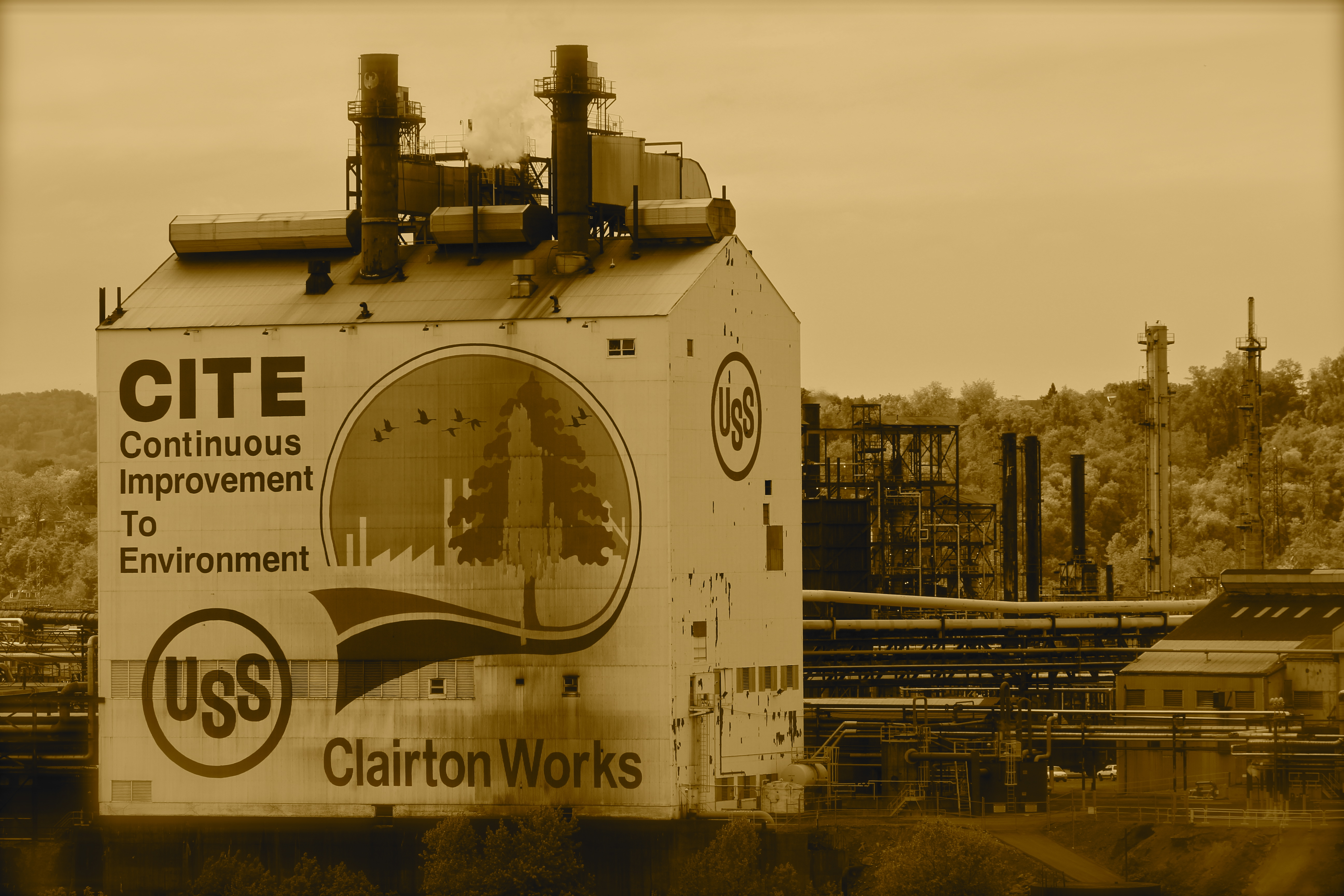
Clairton Coke Works' "Continuous Improvement To Environment" mural, May 2013
