= Morgantown Lock and Dam =

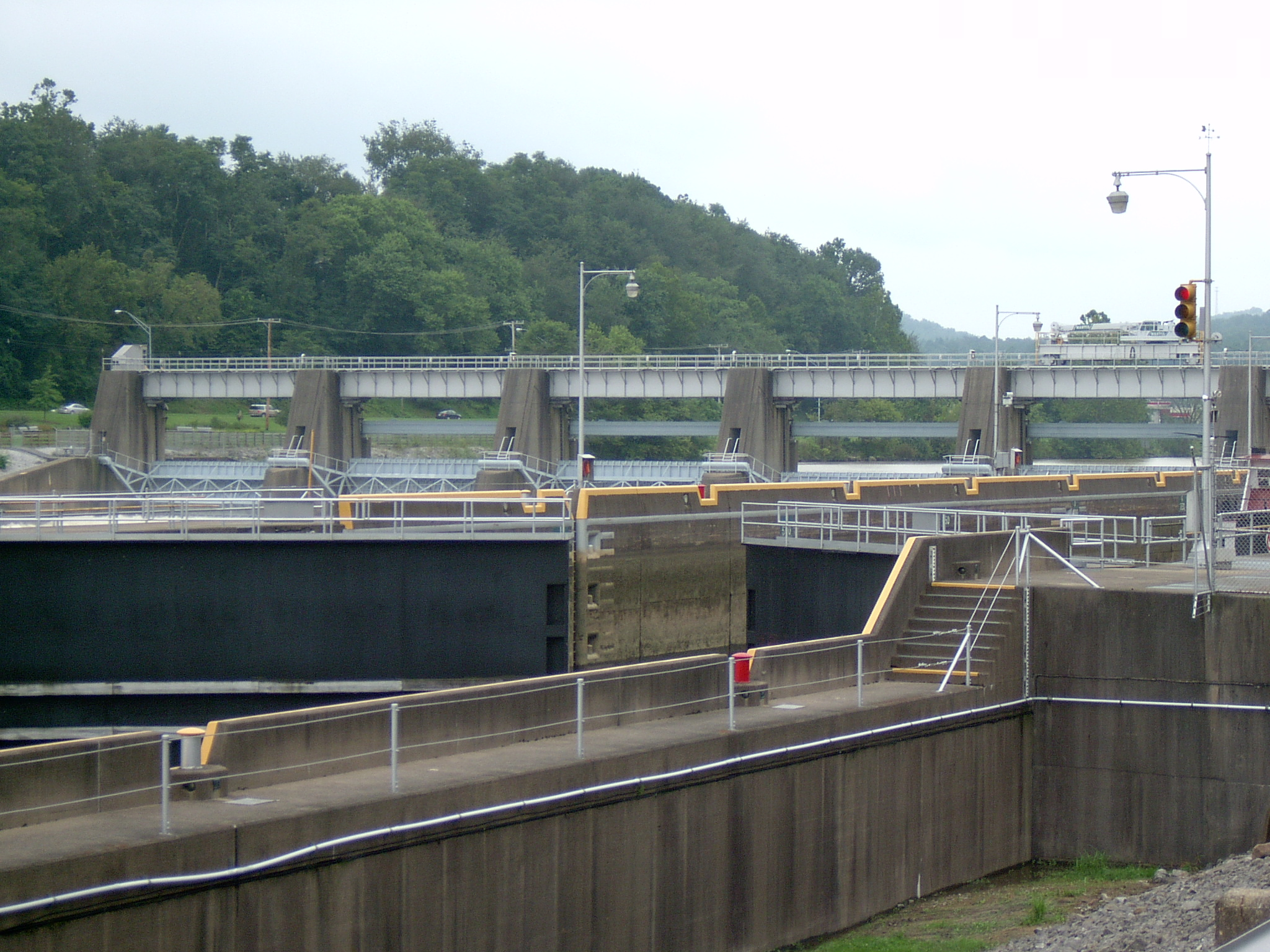
- Location: Morgantown, West Virginia
- Coordinates: 39°37′10″N 79°58′03″W
- Construction began: 1948
- Opening date: 1950
- Operator: U.S. Army Corps of Engineers, Pittsburgh District

Morgantown Lock and Dam is a navigational lock and a gated dam on the Monongahela River at Morgantown, West Virginia. It is part of a series of dams that canalizes the Monongahela to a depth of at least 9 feet (2.7 m) for its entire length from Fairmont, West Virginia to Pittsburgh, Pennsylvania. It is maintained by the U.S. Army Corps of Engineers' Pittsburgh District.

Morgantown has a single lock chamber located on the left-descending river bank. The dam's upper pool extends 6.0 miles (9.7 km) upstream to Hildebrand Lock and Dam, with its 11.2-mile (18.0 km) downstream pool being formed by Point Marion Lock and Dam.

== History ==
Construction on Morgantown Lock and Dam began in 1948 and was completed in 1950. It replaced old Locks 10 and 11, timber crib structures installed in 1897–1903.

== See also ==
- List of crossings of the Monongahela River
