= Hildebrand Lock and Dam =

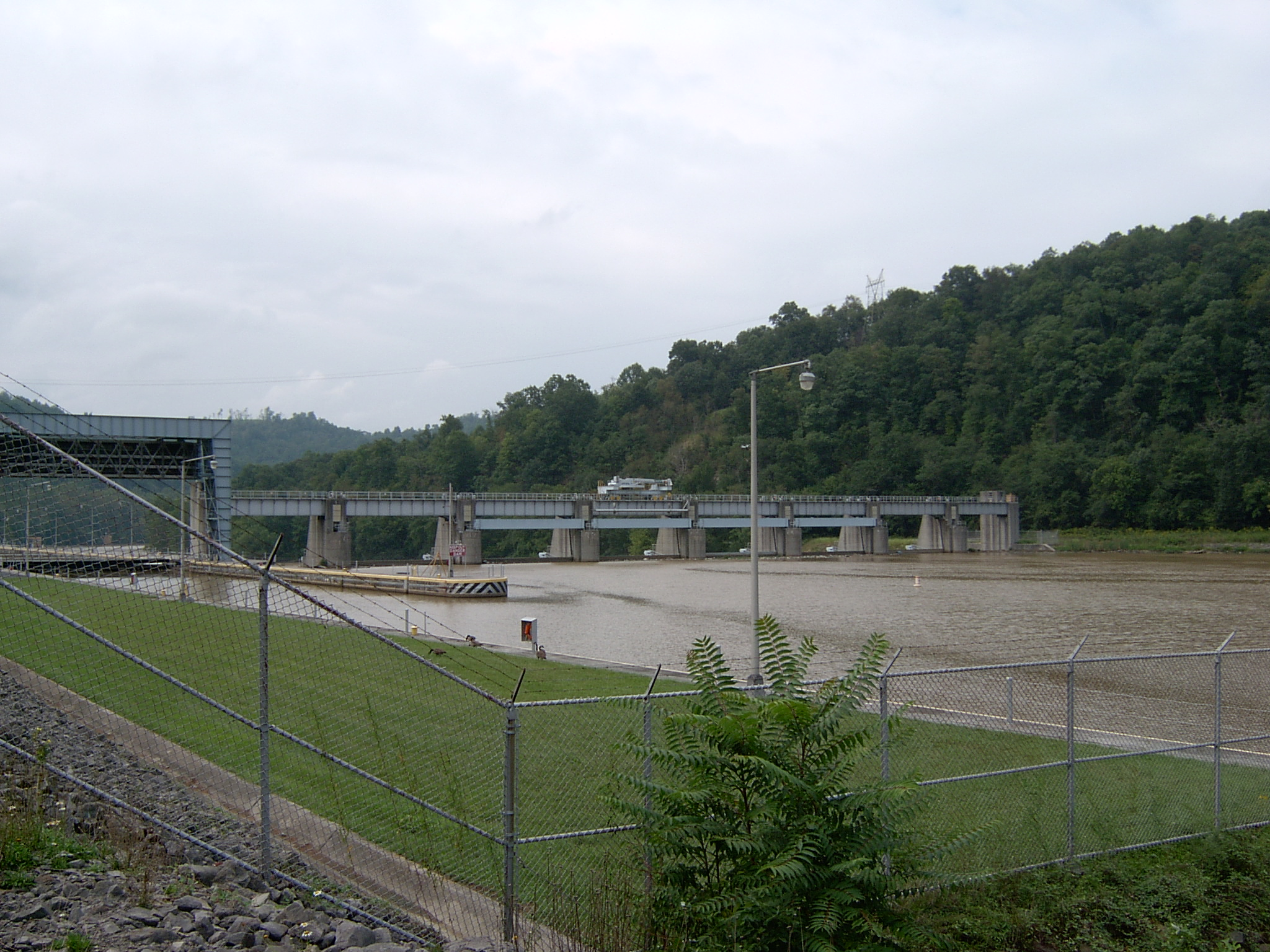
- Location: Monongalia County, West Virginia, USA
- Coordinates: 39°34′58″N 80°00′40″W
- Construction began: 1950
- Opening date: 1960
- Operator: U.S. Army Corps of Engineers, Pittsburgh District

Dam and spillways
- Impounds: Monongahela River

Hildebrand Lock and Dam is a navigational lock and gated dam on the Monongahela River at Hilderbrand, West Virginia. (Hildebrand is a misspelling of Hilderbrand.) It is part of a series of dams that canalizes the Monongahela to a depth of at least 9 feet (2.7 m) for its entire length from Fairmont, West Virginia to Pittsburgh, Pennsylvania. It is maintained by the U.S. Army Corps of Engineers, Pittsburgh District.

Hildebrand has a single lock chamber located on the left-descending river bank. The dam's upper pool extends 7.4 miles (11.9 km) upstream to Opekiska Lock and Dam, with its 6.0-mile (9.7 km) downstream pool being formed by Morgantown Lock and Dam.

== History ==
Construction on Hildebrand Lock and Dam began in 1950 and was completed in 1960. It replaced old Locks 12 and 13, timber crib structures completed in 1903.

== See also ==
- List of crossings of the Monongahela River
