= Franklin Regional School District =

School district in Pennsylvania, United States

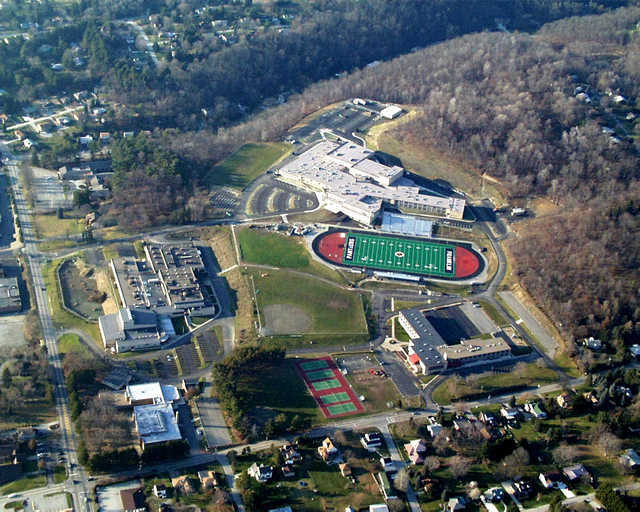

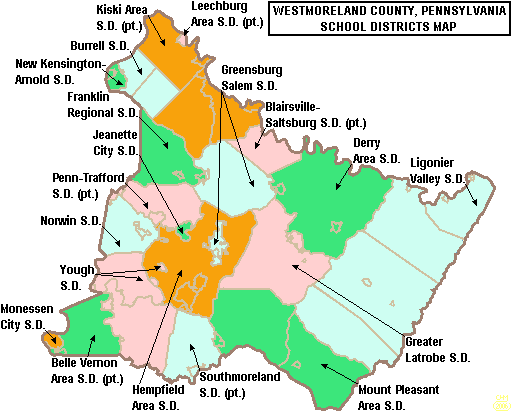

Address
- 3200 School Rd Murrysville, Westmoreland County, Pennsylvania, 15668-1553; United States

District information
- Type: Public
- Grades: K–12
- Established: 1962

Students and staff
- Enrollment: 3,355 pupils
- Faculty: 19
- Teachers: 249
- Staff: 152
- Athletic conference: Keystone
- Colors: Blue and Gold

Other information
- Website: www.franklinregional.k12.pa.us

Franklin Regional School District is a midsized, suburban public school district located in Murrysville, Pennsylvania, serving Murrysville and the neighboring communities of Delmont and Export. Franklin Regional School District encompasses approximately 38 square miles (98 km^{2}). According to 2020 federal census data, it serves a resident population of 19,438 people. According to District officials, in the school year 2021-22, Franklin Regional School District provided basic educational services to 3,555 pupils through the employment of 249 teachers, 152 full-time and part-time support personnel, and 19 administrators.

On April 9, 2014, a mass stabbing incident occurred at the Franklin Regional High School in which 24 people (students, teachers, and police officers) were injured, some of them seriously.

== School campus ==
The school district consists of four buildings: Franklin Regional High School (grades 9–12), Franklin Regional Middle School (grades 6–8), Franklin Regional Intermediate School (grades 3–5), and Franklin Regional Primary School (grades K–2). All buildings except for the Primary and Intermediate schools are situated on the school's main campus at the intersection of School Road and Old William Penn Highway in Murrysville.

Prior to the 2021-22 school year, students in grades K-5 attended one of three schools, Newlonsburg Elementary School, Heritage Elementary School, or Sloan Elementary School, of which all but Sloan were on the main campus. In October 2018, a project was passed by the Murrysville Council to renovate Sloan into a school for grades K-2 (FR Primary School) and to create a nearby new school for grades 3-5 (FR Intermediate School). Construction began in July 2019, and students began attending at the start of the 2021-22 school year. Heritage Elementary School, which formerly contained the Administration Offices was razed. Newlonsburg now houses the new Administration Offices. These plans were delayed due to the finding of asbestos in Heritage's ceilings.

The school's campus at one time also extended to additional schools: Sardis Elementary School in Sardis, Delmont Elementary School in Delmont, White Valley Elementary School in White Valley, and Duff Elementary in Export. The Delmont and Duff school buildings are still standing and have been repurposed for other uses (the Delmont building houses the town library). White Valley Elementary was torn down in the late 1980s and the site is now a playground.

== Extracurricular activities and achievements ==
Franklin Regional School District offers a wide variety of extracurricular activities, clubs, and athletic programs that are available to all students in Grades K through 12.

=== Athletics ===
- In 1979, the Franklin Regional girls' basketball team won the state championship over J. P. McCaskey High School 68–42.
- Regional won the AAA Pennsylvania state championship and WPIAL championship in 2005, defeating Pottsville Area High School 23-13.

=== Arts ===
- The marching band participated in the Macy's Thanksgiving Day Parade in 2003, 2009 and 2019. It was also in the 2012 and 2016 Tournament of Roses Parade. The band also participated in the 2017 Presidential inaugural parade.

== Notable alumni ==
- Julie Benz, actress
- Courtney Hazlett, gossip columnist for MSNBC and msnbc.com
- Sean Hickey – American football player
- Spencer Lee Multi-year World and NCAA Championship wrestler at University of Iowa, 2024 Olympic silver medalist.
- John F. Meier – U.S. Navy aviator and rear admiral
- Bob Moose, former Major League Baseball pitcher
- Manu Narayan, actor
- Tom Ricketts, former NFL offensive lineman
- Maddie Ziegler, dancer featured on Dance Moms; attended Sloan Elementary before moving to California.
- Mackenzie Ziegler, dancer featured on Dance Moms; attended Sloan Elementary before moving to California.

Brooke Hyland, dancer featured on Dance Moms; Was once on the cheerleading Squad Paige Hyland, dancer featured on Dance Moms;
