= Fillmore Auditorium (Denver) =

Concert venue in Denver, Colorado

Coordinates: 39°44′26″N 104°58′37.76″W

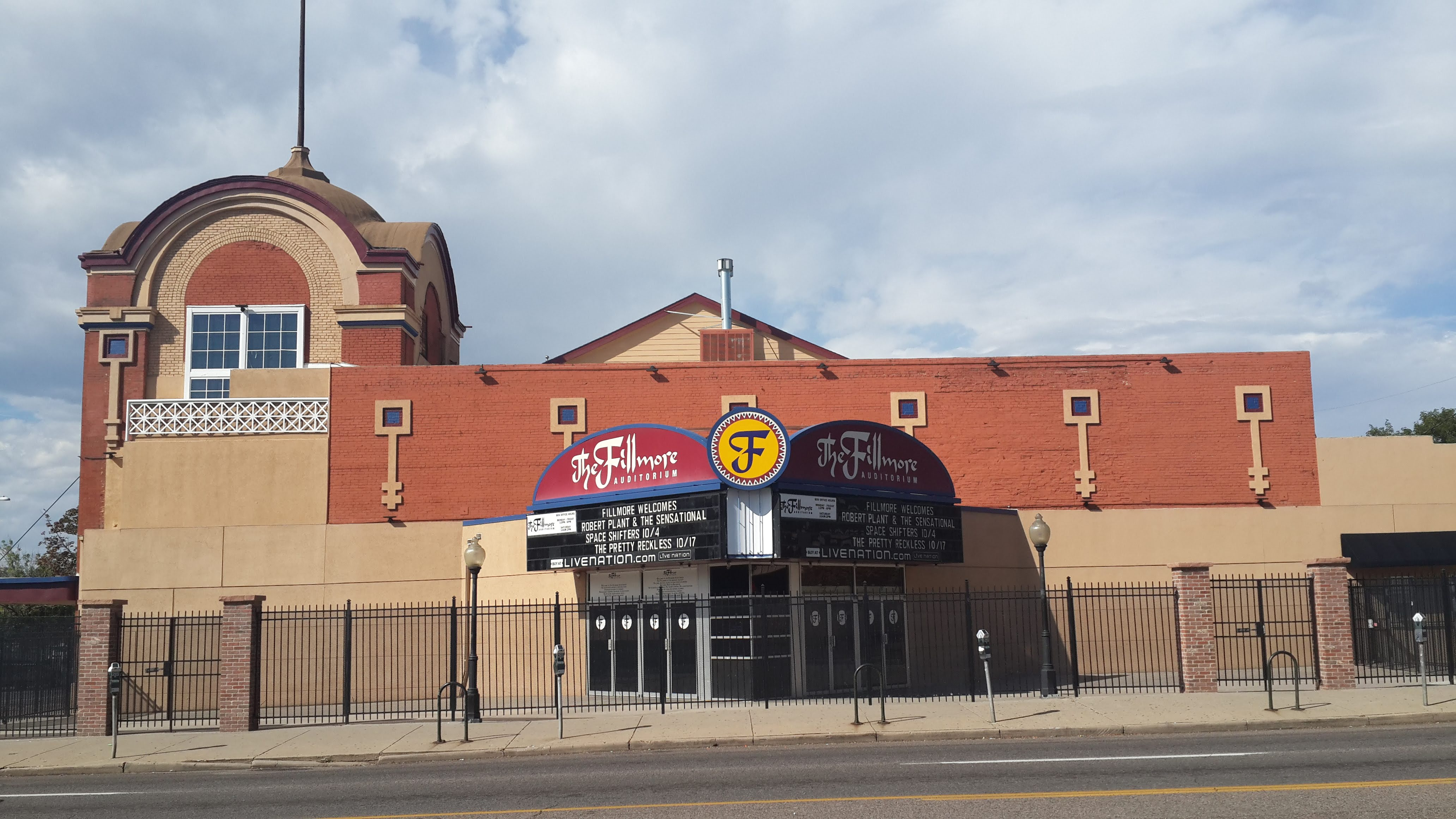
- Entrance of venue seen from Colfax Avenue (c.2014)
- Interactive map of Fillmore Auditorium
- Former names: Mammoth Roller Skating Rink (1907–11); Mammoth Garden Roller Club (1935–62); Mammoth Gardens (1969–70; 1981–82); The Market (1976); Mammoth Events Center (1986–99)
- Address: 1510 N Clarkson St; Denver, CO 80218-1419
- Location: Capitol Hill
- Owner: Live Nation
- Capacity: 3,900

Construction
- Opened: 1907
- Renovated: 1968, 1986, 1999
- Closed: 1917–35; 1970–1976; 1976–81; 1982–86

Tenant
- Rocky Mountain Rollergirls (WFTDA) (2009-Present)

The Fillmore Auditorium (often known as The Fillmore Denver) is a concert venue located in the Capitol Hill neighborhood in Denver, Colorado. Since opening in 1907, the venue has hosted numerous functions both private and public. For decades, it held the title of the largest indoor venue for general admission seating in Colorado. Mission Ballroom, also in Denver has surpassed Fillmore. In 2006, local newspaper Westword awarded the venue the "Best Place to Run into a Hippie turned Yuppie". The venue also houses an office for the Bill Graham Foundation, a non-profit organization that provides music grants.

== History ==
In 1907, the venue opened as the Mammoth Roller Skating Rink, becoming a prominent after-school hangout for the nearby East High School. After the roller rink closed in the spring of 1910, the building was occupied by the Fritchle Automobile & Battery Company. During its tenure as a manufacturing plant, the venue produced nearly 500 vehicles, the first being purchased by Titanic survivor Molly Brown. The plant closed in October 1917.

The building remained unoccupied for several years until it was purchased by Irving Jacob and became the city's first recreational center. Known as Mammoth Garden Roller Club, the center offered ice skating, hockey, basketball, ice polo, boxing, and wrestling. During this time, it also became the home venue for the Mammoth Garden Dodgers (which was a part of the Colorado Roller Hockey League) and a professional basketball team before the construction of the Denver Coliseum.

The venue also served as a temporary wedding hall before and during World War II. It also housed the famed "Skating Vanities" during its 1945–46 season. The venue also hosted the first hockey event broadcast on Armed Forces Radio Services. Every Thursday, games from the venue were broadcast by KLM at Lowry Field. It also hosted the US National Indoor Figure and Speed Championships in 1950, 1952 and 1954. In 1960, the venue hosted its first concert by soul singer James Brown.

As business began moving to the Denver Coliseum, the venue closed and became a warehouse for the Colorado Mercantile Company for five years, closing in 1967. The building was purchased in 1968 by concert promoter Stuart Green, who shortened the name to Mammoth Gardens. The venue was converted from an ice rink to a nightclub. His hopes were to compete with Bill Graham and his Fillmore franchise. The venue worked closely with Barry Fey to bring national touring acts to the Denver scene. Although only in business for eight months, the club hosted concerts by the decade's leading artists including Jethro Tull (band), The Who, The Grateful Dead, Johnny Winter and Joe Cocker. The club closed in October 1970 as a push by city officials to have the venue closed to improve the surrounding neighborhood. The building reopened briefly in 1976 as a farmers' market, known simply as The Market; however, this only lasted four months.

In 1981, the venue was reopened under the "Mammoth Gardens" moniker to host sporting and music events while also servicing as a private meeting room and banquet hall. After 14 months, the doors closed once again due to a dispute among its partners. Four years later, the venue was purchased by Manuel and Magaly Fernandez. After some renovations, the venue became the Mammoth Events Center. During this reinvention, the venue became the main site for Denver's Latin music scene and various other touring acts. During its 12-year run, the venue hosted various concerts, with such names as The Mighty Mighty Bosstones, Beastie Boys, Fishbone, Murphy's Law (band), Ozzy Osbourne, Cyndi Lauper, Pantera, Slayer, Club Nouveau, DJ Quik, Rick James, Cypress Hill, Siouxsie & the Banshees, Big Audio Dynamite, Jane's Addiction, Fugazi, the Offspring, Sublime, Butthole Surfers, Dream Theater, Blink-182, Oasis, Coldplay, Green Day and many others. It also hosted various sporting events over the years including the Ultimate Fighting Championship, Pro Wrestling America and World Championship Wrestling.

The venue was sold by the Fernandezs in February 1999 to Bill Graham Presents. Later, that entity combined forces with Live Nation, and the venue re-opened as the Fillmore Auditorium. This was met with controversy among the Colorado audience and luminaries, many of whom felt Denver had an ample amount of music venues. The Magness Arena, Ogden Theatre, Paramount Theatre, the Music Hall at LoDo and the Gothic Theatre were already claiming fame to Denver's mid-size concert scene. Due to its many physical changes and uses over the years, some promoters saw the venue as a failure and were not easily persuaded to host a concert at the venue. Promoter Barry Fey, who preferred not to use the venue, stated the unpopular opinion that "hell" had better connotations than "Mammoth".

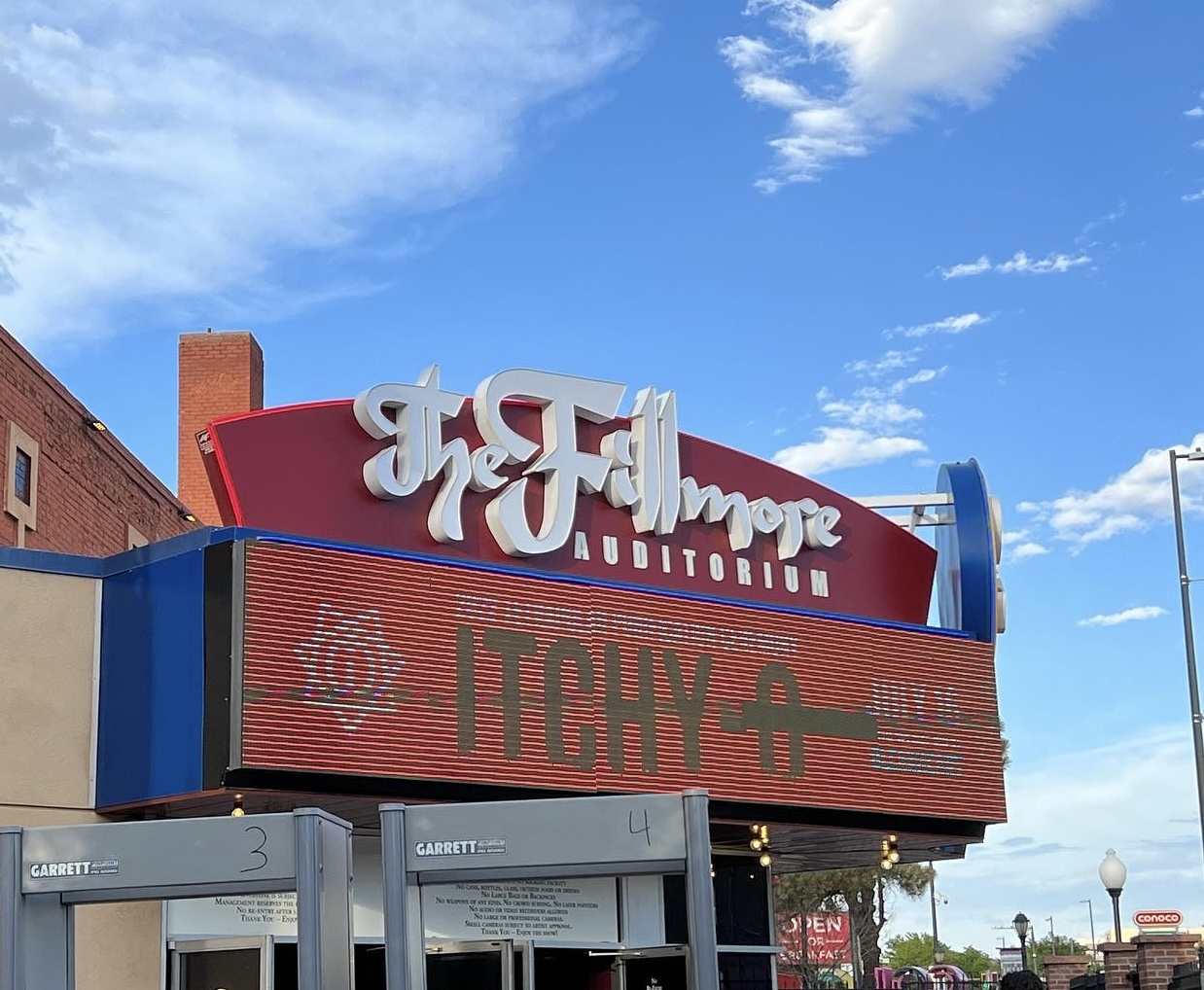
The Fillmore Auditorium sign (July 2022)

Despite its challenges, the building was heavily renovated between November 1998 and May 1999, relocating the stage, fixing the acoustics and adding many amenities. The inaugural concert was performed by the Trey Anastasio Band on May 19, 1999. The Fillmore has grown to become a prominent force in Denver's music scene. Since its 1999 opening, the auditorium has hosted concerts by Bob Dylan, Widespread Panic, NOFX, Morrissey, Foo Fighters, Bad Religion, Umphrey's McGee, Sound Tribe Sector 9, Marilyn Manson, Joss Stone, Nelly Furtado, James Blunt, Owl City, Armin van Buuren, Erykah Badu, Paramore, Ghost, AJR, Panic! At The Disco as well as Five Iron Frenzy's final performance. Since then the venue has hosted over 1,900 acts including a visit by President Barack Obama and all together attended by 2,700,000 patrons.

The Fillmore annually ranks as one of America's top 10 grossing and attended clubs in both Billboard and Pollstar magazines.

In 2017 the Fillmore began an ambitious remodel, the first of its scope in over a decade. Some of the updates included increasing the size of the artist backstage, green rooms, showers, furniture, TVs, and adding a full service kitchen that serves artists and crew nightly. Another big upgrade has been the addition of over 50 men's and women's bathrooms. The changes have come with glowing reviews from the Denver Post, Billboard, Pollstar and more.

Events and tenants
Preceded by McNichols Sports Arena; Buffalo Memorial Auditorium	Ultimate Fighting Championship venue UFC 2 Ultimate Ultimate 1995	Succeeded by Grady Cole Center; Coliseo Rubén Rodríguez
