= Westmoreland Conservancy =

Land trust in Murrysville, Pennsylvania, US

The Westmoreland Conservancy, is a nationally accredited, all-volunteer land trust that is located in Murrysville, Pennsylvania in the United States.

== History ==
This organization was established in 1991 in order to preserve rural and rustic open spaces in the Murrysville, Pennsylvania, area for the use, enjoyment and benefit of everyone. It has been instrumental in protecting 600 acres of open space since that time, the first property being the fifty-six-acre Kellman property, which is now a municipal nature reserve.

This non-profit organization owns 10 reserves spanning 600 acres (2.4 km^{2}). Seven of these reserves: Caywood (43 acres), King (96), McGinnis (52), Potter (3), Tomer (18), Walter (29), Morosini (183) are crossed by miles of hiking trails and are home to a variety of wildlife, including: deer, skunks, foxes and coyotes. They are available for year-round individual hiking.

The 20-acre (81,000 m^{2}) Flinn Reserve currently has no hiking trails and is used for nature study.

== Activities ==
Throughout the year, the Westmoreland Conservancy sponsors free nature hikes through the reserves. These hikes will often have a special focus of interest such as wildflowers, birds, butterflies, nature photography, or local history. Caching with the Conservancy (CWTC) is a popular geocaching event held annually in June and occasionally in the Fall as well.

== Projects ==
The Westmoreland Conservancy partnered with the municipality of Murrysville to establish an east–west community trail. That trail, known as the Don Harrison Community Trail, makes use of both conservancy and municipal properties and utilizes two private right-of-way links to create a passage more than five miles long. Beginning at the Walter Reserve on Weistertown Road at the western edge of Murrysville, the trail passes through the Murrysville Community Park, the Caywood Reserve, two ROW passages and the King and Potter Reserves the trail crosses both Hills Church and Crowfoot Roads.

When the Sloan School segment of trail is completed, it will then cross Sardis Road and pass along a municipal connector to reach Townsend Park at the eastern side of the community.
