= Online Stores =

American e-commerce company

Online Stores Inc.
- Company type: Private
- Industry: E-commerce
- Founded: January 2001; 25 years ago (as United States Flag Store); Export, Pennsylvania, U.S.
- Founders: Lisa Hickey; Kevin Hickey
- Headquarters: New Stanton, Pennsylvania
- Key people: Lisa Hickey, Chairman; Kevin Hickey, CEO; John Gilkey, Vice President
- Revenue: USD$ 18 million
- Number of employees: 60 in New Stanton, Pennsylvania
- Divisions: United States Flag Store; English Tea Store; Discount Safety Store; Safety Girl Store; Construction Gear Store; ToySplash Store

Online Stores, Inc. is an e-commerce company based in New Stanton, Pennsylvania, specializing in retail niche markets that has been in operation since 2001. Its best-selling products are American flags. The privately owned company employs approximately 60 people and includes six stores: United States Flag Store, English Tea Store, Discount Safety Gear Store, Safety Girl Store, ToySplash, Construction Gear Store.

== History ==
Online Stores opened its first retail store, United States Flag Store, in January 2001, operating from co-owners Lisa and Kevin Hickey’s basement. In September 2001, high demand for American flags and short supply for both retailers and consumers led Online Stores to begin wholesaling some of its American flags. The store also carries international flags as well as flag accessories. The company also produces resource sites on flag history and information.

In 2003, the company opened the English Tea Store, which imports more than 100 kinds of tea, British food products, and tea-making appliances and accessories. In 2004, the company opened the Discount Safety Gear Store, which sells protective equipment, such as safety harnesses, custom-printed hard hats, eye and ear protection, and first-aid kits.

In 2008, the company acquired the Construction Gear Store, which sells insulated work boots, rugged clothing, tool belts, thermal undergarments, and other items.

The year of 2009 brought 'The Safety Girl Store' which is a site dedicated exclusively to women's safety and personal protection. Items include pepper spray, stun guns, emergency roadside kits, work boots and more.

The newest store, ToySplash, offers water play toys. It was acquired in 2014 and brought to New Stanton from Arizona.

On February 5, 2026, Online Stores filed for Chapter 11 bankruptcy protection.

== Recognition ==
2013:

- Ranked # 398 in Internet Retailer's "Top 500 Guide"

2012:

- Ranked # 22 Pittsburgh Business Times "Largest Pittsburgh-Area Women-Owned Businesses" list.

2011:

- Ranked # 64 Pittsburgh Business Times "100 Fastest Growing Companies" list registering 26.84% growth from 2008–2010

2010:

- Ranked # 2,1822 on Inc. 5000 "Fastest Growing Private Companies in America" list registering 80% growth between 2006–2009
- Ranked # 64 Pittsburgh Business Times "100 Fastest Growing Companies" list registering 37.47% growth from 2007–2009

2009:

- Ranked # 2,186 on Inc. 5000 "Fastest Growing Private Companies in America" list registering 144% growth between 2005–2008
- Ranked # 73 Pittsburgh Business Times "100 Fastest Growing Companies" list registering 59.56% growth from 2006–2008

2008:

- Ranked # 85 on Inc.com "Top 100 Retail Companies" list
- Ranked # 2,074 on Inc. 5000 "Fastest Growing Private Companies in America" list registering 178.2% growth between 2004–2007
- Named to Pittsburgh Business Times "100 Fastest Growing Companies" list registering 24% growth from 2007

2007:

- Ranked # 368 in Internet Retailer's "Top 500 Guide"
- Ranked # 2 in the Retail/Wholesale Distribution category and # 41 overall on the Pittsburgh Business Times "Fastest Growing Retail Companies" list

2006:

- Ranked # 2 in overall employment growth and # 19 overall on Pittsburgh Business Times "Fastest Growing Retail Companies" lists
- Ranked # 378 in Internet Retailer’s "Top 500 Guide"
