= The Genie Company =

American manufacturer of garage door openers

GMI Holdings Inc. The Genie Company
- Company type: Subsidiary of Overhead Door Corporation
- Industry: Garage door openers
- Founded: 1923 as Alliance Manufacturing Company
- Headquarters: Mt. Hope, Ohio, U.S.
- Area served: United States and Canada
- Key people: Michael Noyes, President
- Parent: Overhead Door Corporation
- Website: www.geniecompany.com

GMI Holdings Inc. (dba The Genie Company) is an American manufacturer of garage door openers & related accessories. It was founded in 1923 as the Alliance Manufacturing Company, located in Alliance, Ohio. At the time the company produced a broad line of consumer, industrial and military products. In May 1954, the Alliance Manufacturing Company first produced its own garage door opener and called it Genie. In 1983 the company entered the home and shop vacuum market, and in 1985 it changed its name to Genie Home Products. Overhead Door Corporation purchased the company in 1994. The Genie Company is headquartered in Mt. Hope, Ohio. The company distributes its openers & accessories through professional dealers and retailers throughout the United States and Canada. The company President is Michael Noyes.

Genie's factory is located in nearby Baltic, Ohio.
