= John Malecki =

American football player (born 1988)

No. 62
- Position: Offensive guard

Personal information
- Born: May 26, 1988 (age 38); Pittsburgh, Pennsylvania, U.S.
- Listed height: 6 ft 2 in (1.88 m)
- Listed weight: 299 lb (136 kg)

Career information
- High school: Franklin Regional (Murrysville, Pennsylvania)
- College: Pittsburgh
- NFL draft: 2010: undrafted

Career history
- Tennessee Titans (2010)*; Cleveland Browns (2010)*; Tampa Bay Buccaneers (2010)*; Cleveland Browns (2010)*; Tampa Bay Buccaneers (2010–2011)*; Pittsburgh Steelers (2011)*; Washington Redskins (2011)*; Pittsburgh Steelers (2011–2012)
- * Offseason or practice squad member only

Career NFL statistics
- Games played: 1
- Stats at Pro Football Reference

John Malecki (born May 26, 1988) is an American former professional football player who was an offensive guard in the National Football League (NFL). He signed with the Tennessee Titans as an undrafted free agent in 2010. He played college football for the Pittsburgh Panthers. Malecki is now a content creator focused on woodworking and power tools.

== College career ==
He played college football at the University of Pittsburgh. He was named to the Big East All-Academic Football Team. After the 2008 season, he was selected as the Pittsburgh Panthers Most Improved Offensive Player.

== Professional career ==
=== Tennessee Titans ===
On April 10, 2010, Malecki signed with the Tennessee Titans as an undrafted free agent. On August 10, 2010, he was released.

=== Cleveland Browns ===
On August 13, 2010, Malecki signed with the Cleveland Browns. On August 31, he was released.

=== Tampa Bay Buccaneers ===
On October 26, 2010, Malecki signed with the Tampa Bay Buccaneers to join the practice squad. After spending the 2010 season on the practice squad, he was re-signed by the Tampa Bay Buccaneers on January 4, 2011 to a futures contract.

=== Pittsburgh Steelers ===
On August 7, 2011, Malecki signed with the Pittsburgh Steelers. On September 2, 2011, he was released. On September 4, 2011, he was signed to the practice squad.

=== Washington Redskins ===
On October 19, 2011, Malecki was signed with the Washington Redskins to join their practice squad. On October 26, 2011, he was released from the practice squad.

=== Return to the Pittsburgh Steelers ===
On January 18, 2012, Malecki was signed by the Pittsburgh Steelers to a future contract. On August 31, 2012, he was released. On September 1, 2012, he was signed to the practice squad. On October 20, 2012, he was promoted to the active roster. On October 27, he was waived after the team promoted safety Da'Mon Cromartie-Smith to the active roster. On October 30, Malecki was re-signed to the practice squad. On November 26, 2012, he was promoted to the active roster. On or before September 2, 2013, the Steelers waived him.

== Post-playing career ==
After his professional football career ended, Malecki and his former teammate Baron Batch founded Studio AM, and began posting their woodworking projects to Facebook and Instagram. Malecki soon created a YouTube channel to showcase his unique woodworking projects. He also co-hosts the "Made for Profit" podcast with fellow YouTuber Brad Rodriguez of "Fix This Build That."
