= 2014 Franklin Regional High School stabbing =

Mass stabbing in Pennsylvania, US

- Location: 40°25′45″N 79°40′09″W; Murrysville, Pennsylvania, US
- Date: April 9, 2014 c. 7:13 a.m. – c. 7:18 a.m.
- Target: Students and staff at Franklin Regional High School
- Attack type: Mass stabbing, attempted mass murder
- Weapon: Two 8-inch kitchen knives
- Deaths: 0
- Injuries: 24 (22 directly, including the perpetrator)
- Perpetrator: Alexander B. Hribal
- Motive: Dissatisfaction with school and society

On April 9, 2014, Alexander Hribal, a 16-year-old sophomore at the school, used a pair of eight-inch kitchen knives to stab and slash 20 students and a security guard in a mass stabbing at Franklin Regional High School in Murrysville, Pennsylvania, United States. Four students sustained life-threatening injuries, but all survived.

== Attack ==
At around 07:13 a.m., minutes before classes began, Hribal, wearing black clothing, began stabbing and slashing students in the school's first-floor science hallway. After stabbing several people, Hribal pulled a fire alarm, attempting to bring more students out into the hallway, according to witness testimony and surveillance footage.

Hribal, who witnesses said looked "emotionless" during the attack, wounded 20 students and a security guard before he was subdued by Sam King, the school's assistant principal, with the help of student Ian Griffith. While he was being restrained by King, Hribal reportedly refused to drop the knives, saying, "My work is not done. I have more people to kill."

== Aftermath ==
A total of 22 people, including Hribal, were injured during the rampage. Officials said Hribal did not appear to have targeted any specific person.

The University of Pittsburgh Medical Center (UPMC) treated twelve patients. UPMC officials stated that two boys were in critical condition, two boys were in serious condition, and a boy and two girls were in fair condition. One victim was placed on a ventilator after a knife pierced his liver, while another suffered an open wound to the face that required 11 sutures. The teenage victims ranged in age from 14 to 17. Eight other patients were taken to Forbes Regional Hospital in nearby Monroeville. Several of those victims suffered serious injuries, including "deep wounds to the abdomen," according to hospital officials. In addition to the stabbing victims, two other students suffered unrelated injuries while fleeing the school. Hribal was treated for injuries to his hand. On May 18, 2014, Greg Keener, the last of the victims, was discharged from Forbes Regional Hospital.

Franklin Regional High School was closed for several days while workers from a restoration company cleaned up. On April 14, classes resumed at the school. On April 9, 2015, Murrysville marked the one-year anniversary of the stabbing rampage. Several local churches held worship services that night.

== Perpetrator ==
Alexander Brando Hribal (born October 1, 1997) was taken into custody after the stabbing as the suspected perpetrator. He alleged that he was depressed, had suicidal thoughts during the fifth grade, and that those emotions returned while he was attending Franklin Regional High School. He was believed by police to have threatened at least two students by phone prior to the rampage, but neither student was one of the victims. Officials have declared that Hribal was responsible for the stabbing, that he stabbed people in multiple classrooms, and that he used two "straight knives", measuring 8 to 10 inches (20.32 to 25.4 cm), to carry it out. According to testimony, Hribal had begun planning the attack on September 22, 2013.

Several items belonging to Hribal were seized from his home, including a notebook with writing in it and a knife holder assumed to have held the two knives used in the attack. A cellphone was also seized from Hribal's school locker, as was a note titled "Ragnarok", dated April 6, which read, "I can't wait to see the priceless and helpless looks on the faces of the students of one of the 'best schools in Pennsylvania' realize their precious lives are going to be taken by the only one among them that isn't a plebian [sic]."

On June 10, 2014, a warrant was unsealed which stated that Hribal had written a document about the Norse legend Ragnarök, as well as his dissatisfaction with society. The warrant also stated that two students had received threatening phone calls on the day before the stabbing, which were suspected to have been from Hribal. On September 26, 2014, psychologist Bruce Chambers testified that Hribal was inspired by the 1999 Columbine High School massacre, that he identified with the perpetrators Eric Harris and Dylan Klebold, and that he had originally planned to carry out the stabbing on April 20, the fifteenth anniversary of Columbine, but changed the date to April 9, the birthday of Eric Harris, because April 20 fell on a Sunday that year.

== Prosecution, guilty plea, and sentencing ==
Hribal was initially charged as an adult with four counts of attempted homicide, 21 counts of aggravated assault, and one count of carrying a weapon on school property. On April 25, 2014, Hribal's charges were upgraded to 21 counts of attempted homicide and 21 counts of aggravated assault, after investigators discovered a note written by him that declared his intention to take lives during the attack.

In June 2014, Hribal pleaded not guilty to all charges. He waived a formal arraignment. The Westmoreland County Common Pleas Judge Richard E. McCormick, Jr. ordered a mental health assessment for Hribal. In September 2014, while leaving a mental health hearing, Hribal told a news reporter that he was sorry for committing the attack. He was expected to be transferred to Southwood Psychiatric Hospital in Pittsburgh, Pennsylvania, after passing a medical examination and psychiatric evaluation, but the hospital refused to admit him, reportedly due to safety concerns. Three psychiatrists testified for the defense, saying that Hribal had major depressive disorder and schizotypal personality disorder. They all agreed that he was responding to treatment.

A trial date was postponed several times. A hearing was held to determine whether the case would be transferred to juvenile court; victims of the rampage testified about their injuries and urged the judge to try Hribal as an adult. In September 2015, a judge ruled that Hribal must be transferred from a juvenile detention center to Westmoreland County Prison when he turns eighteen years old. In October 2015, this transfer was carried out, and the judge refused to set bail for Hribal, citing public safety concerns.

In June and November 2015, testimony statements were given by victims and defense experts in regards to the decision whether Hribal's case should be moved to juvenile court. The prosecution argued that Hribal planned the attack in advance and traumatized his victims and the community, while Hribal's lawyer argued that no one was killed during the stabbings despite the serious injuries inflicted, and that the victims' testimonies indicated they appeared to have moved on. In May 2016, Judge Christopher Feliciani ruled that Hribal would be tried as an adult.

On October 24, 2017, Hribal, then 20, pleaded guilty in the Westmoreland County Court of Common Pleas to 21 counts each of attempted homicide and aggravated assault. Defense attorney Thomassey said that the Hribal family wished to spare victims from having to testify and relive the attack at trial. The plea came after Judge Feliciani denied the defense's requests to allow Hribal to plead guilty but mentally ill. District Attorney John Peck stated that he planned to push for a prison sentence of 30 to 60 years, while Thomassey said he will argue for "as light a sentence as I can."

On January 22, 2018, Judge Christopher Feliciani sentenced Alex Hribal to serve 23 ½ to 60 years in prison. Hribal appealed the sentence stating that he was mentally ill at the time of the attack and that his obsession with Eric Harris and Dylan Klebold made him feel connected to their crimes. On October 23, 2019, the Superior Court of Pennsylvania rejected Hribal's claim and upheld the lower court's verdict.

As of December 2024, Hribal has been incarcerated at the State Correctional Institution in Albion, Pennsylvania.

== School security ==
The school was not equipped with metal detectors. Since February 2013, the school district had 130 video cameras from various schools live streamed to police, explained as a precaution against violent incidents. On May 5, 2014, the school distributed clear backpacks to all of its students, courtesy of Monroeville car dealership, #1 Cochran. School district spokeswoman Mary Catherine Reljac said in a statement that the measure was intended to "bring an added sense of safety and security during the school day as the school community continues to heal".

== Reaction ==
Following the incident, Pennsylvania Governor Tom Corbett visited Murrysville and held a press conference, during which he gave a speech praising the heroes of the rampage. He also called April 9 another "sad day" in the country and asked if schools should have metal detectors. On April 10, U.S. President Barack Obama called Franklin Principal Ron Suvak to tell him that the FBI would continue to assist in the investigation of the attack.

== See also ==
- Crime in Pennsylvania
- List of attacks related to secondary schools
- 1998 Parker Middle School dance shooting – fatal shooting at a Pennsylvania school dance
