= Mary Bach =

American consumer rights activist

Mary Bach is an American consumer rights activist from Murrysville, Pennsylvania. She is known for advocating for consumer rights, for calling attention to scams and frauds, and for filing civil lawsuits against retailers over pricing discrepancies.

== Early life and career ==
Before engaging in consumer advocacy, Mary Bach worked as a high school teacher. She left teaching in 1971 after becoming pregnant, during which time she developed an interest in saving money through comparison shopping, coupon use, and understanding retail pricing practices. Her work in consumer activism began in 1978, when she began teaching adult education classes called "Winning at the Supermarket" in local school districts and organized a Coupon Clippers group for women in Westmoreland County, Pennsylvania.

== Consumer advocacy ==
Bach's work expanded during the 1980s after she watched a consumer affairs report on television about comparison grocery shopping and felt that her methods would lead to a cheaper shop. She successfully challenged the reporter by demonstrating how using her coupon strategies could lead to lower totals. This success led to media appearances and further recognition from the public. She began to speak regularly on consumer issues, and appeared on national television programs. Bach subsequently became active in educating the public about scams and fraud—such as telemarketing fraud and identity theft—and worked with organizations to raise awareness on these issues.

== Lawsuits ==
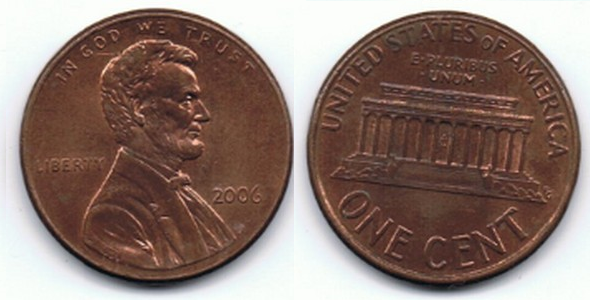
Mary Bach successfully sued Wal-Mart after she was overcharged two cents (pictured) for a package of frozen sausages.

Bach is known for filing civil lawsuits against retailers over pricing discrepancies such as incorrect pricing or improper taxation. These cases have typically cited Pennsylvania's Unfair Trade Practices and Consumer Protection Law, which allows consumers to sue retailers for whichever is greater of $100 or the amount of their damages. In one case in 2011, Bach successfully sued Walmart after she was overcharged two cents on a package of frozen sausages. A judge awarded her $100 in damages plus $80 in court costs. In another case in 2023, Bach successfully sued Walgreens for imposing a tax on toilet paper.

== Recognition ==
In June 2025, Jill Cooper—a Republican member of the Pennsylvania House of Representatives—honored Bach for her 50 years of community service with a House of Representatives citation. Praising Bach, Cooper stated: "She has helped Pennsylvanians save tens of thousands, if not hundreds of thousands, of dollars. ... Between making certain shoppers are aware of dishonest sales practices and calling attention to scams and fraud, she is a renowned expert."
