= Baltic, Ohio =

- Village
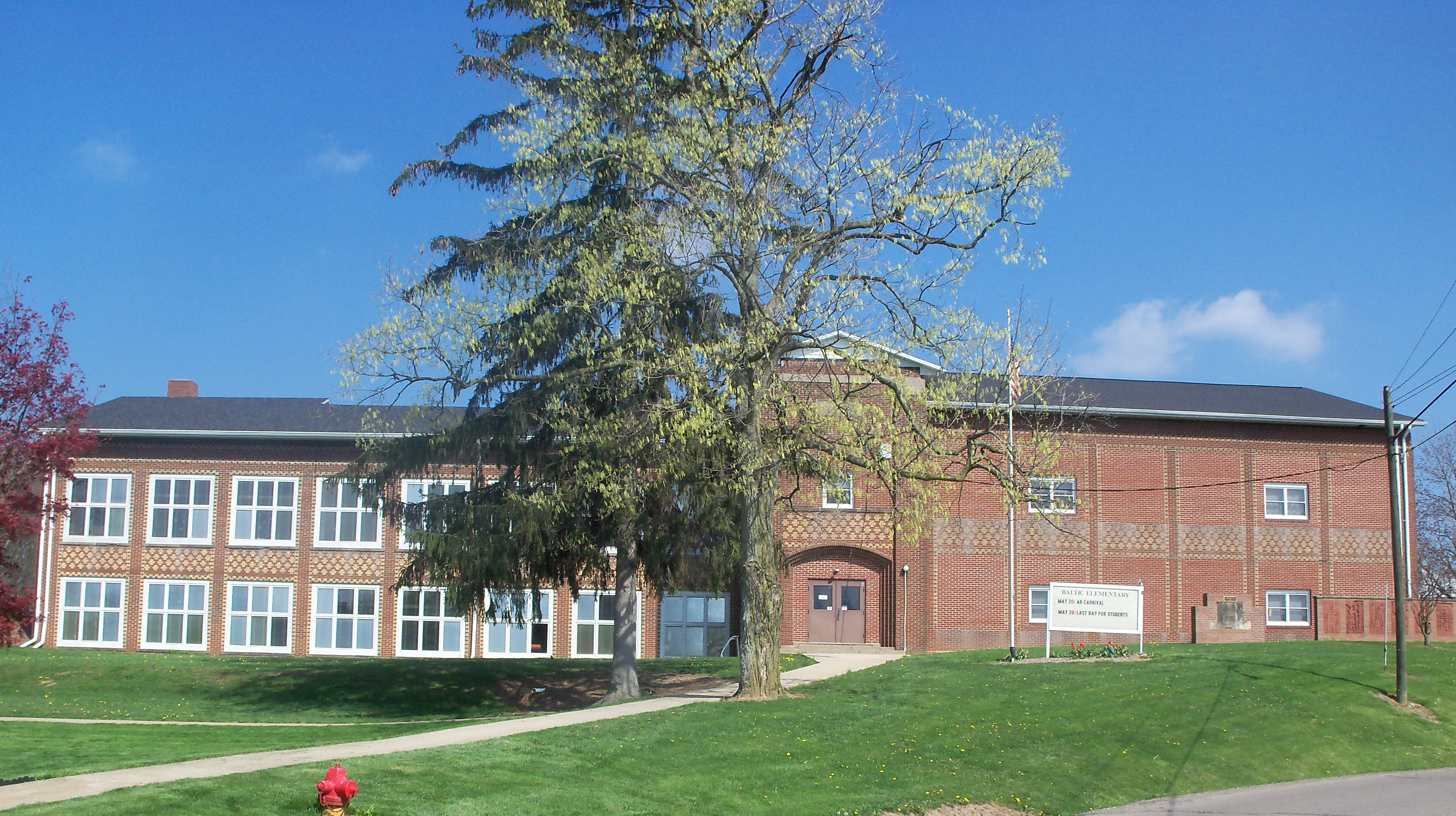
- Baltic Elementary School

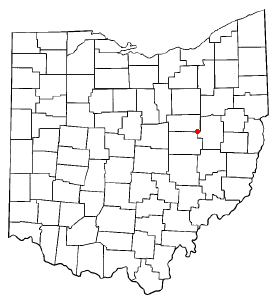
- Location of Baltic, Ohio

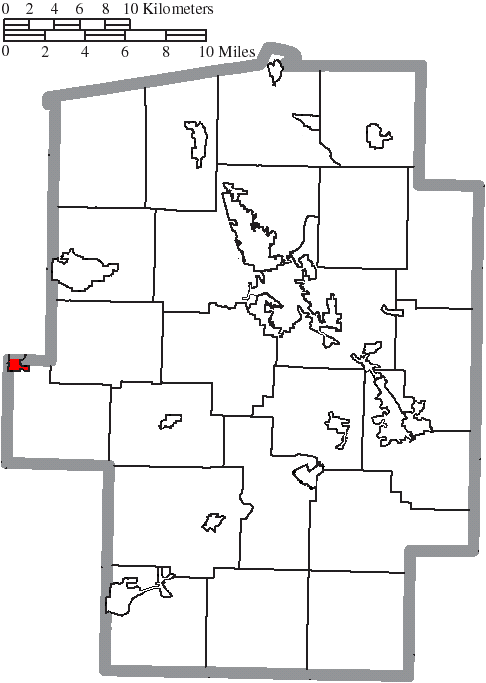
- Location of Baltic in Tuscarawas County
- Coordinates: 40°26′37″N 81°42′04″W
- Country: United States
- State: Ohio
- Counties: Tuscarawas, Holmes, Coshocton
- Townships: Bucks, Clark, Crawford

Area
  - Total: 0.81 sq mi (2.10 km^{2})
  - Land: 0.81 sq mi (2.10 km^{2})
  - Water: 0 sq mi (0.00 km^{2})
- Elevation: 1,024 ft (312 m)

Population (2020)
  - Total: 851
  - Estimate (2023): 826
  - Density: 1,051.4/sq mi (405.93/km^{2})
- Time zone: UTC−5 (Eastern (EST))
  - Summer (DST): UTC−4 (EDT)
- ZIP Code: 43804
- Area code: 330
- FIPS code: 39-03744
- GNIS feature ID: 2398024
- Website: https://villageofbaltic.com/

Baltic is a village in Coshocton, Holmes, and Tuscarawas counties in the U.S. state of Ohio. The population was 851 at the 2020 census.

== History ==
Baltic was originally called Rowville, and under the latter name was platted in 1848. Baltic became a qualified Tree City USA as recognized by the National Arbor Day Foundation in 1982.

== Geography ==
According to the U.S. Census Bureau, the village has a total area of 0.80 square miles (2.07 km^{2}), all land.

== Demographics ==
Historical population
Census	Pop.	Note	%±
1910	377		—
1920	406		7.7%
1930	545		34.2%
1940	492		−9.7%
1950	493		0.2%
1960	537		8.9%
1970	571		6.3%
1980	563		−1.4%
1990	659		17.1%
2000	743		12.7%
2010	795		7.0%
2020	851		7.0%
2023 (est.)	826	▼	−2.9%
U.S. Decennial Census

90.2% spoke English, 5.3% German, 2.3% Dutch and Pennsylvania German as their first language.

=== 2010 census ===
As of the 2010 census, there were 795 people, 277 households, and 187 families living in the village. The population density was 993.8 inhabitants per square mile (383.7/km^{2}). There were 298 housing units at an average density of 372.5 per square mile (143.8/km^{2}). The racial makeup of the village was 98.5% White, 0.6% African American, 0.1% Asian, and 0.8% from two or more races. Hispanic or Latino of any race were 0.3% of the population. 65.1% were of German, 14.3% Irish, 9.5% Swiss, and 5.8% English descent.

There were 277 households, of which 33.9% had children under the age of 18 living with them, 54.5% were married couples living together, 8.7% had a female householder with no husband present, 4.3% had a male householder with no wife present, and 32.5% were non-families. 27.1% of all households were made up of individuals, and 15.6% had someone living alone who was 65 years of age or older. The average household size was 2.53 and the average family size was 3.11.

The median age in the village was 40.9 years. 25.2% of residents were under the age of 18; 6.1% were between the ages of 18 and 24; 23.9% were from 25 to 44; 23.5% were from 45 to 64; and 21.4% were 65 years of age or older. The gender makeup of the village was 50.1% male and 49.9% female.

== Economy ==
The Raber's Almanac for the Amish community is published in Baltic. It is also home to the garage door opener factory of The Genie Company.

== Notable people ==
- Owen Scheetz, appeared in six games for the Washington Senators during the 1943 season
