= Courtney Hazlett =

American journalist (born 1976)

- Born: October 2, 1976 (age 49)
- Education: Tulane University, 1999; Columbia University, 2005
- Occupation: Journalist
- Title: Supervising Entertainment editor, NBC News, digital
- Spouse: Steven Marrs

Courtney Brooke Hazlett is the supervising entertainment editor for NBC News' digital properties, NBCNews.com and TODAY.com. Prior to that she was a columnist and Celebrity Correspondent for todayshow.com, the official site for NBC's The Today Show. She is the author of "The Scoop" blog and column, featured on the todayshow.com, msnbc.com, and Newsvine websites. Hazlett also provides on-air commentary for The Today Show and MSNBC programs.

== Biography ==
=== Early life ===
Hazlett, a native of Murrysville, Pennsylvania, is a 1995 graduate of Franklin Regional High School. She received a bachelor's degree in philosophy in 1999 from Tulane University, and earned a M.S. in journalism from the Columbia University Graduate School of Journalism in 2005.

=== Career ===
After graduating from Tulane, Hazlett held editorial positions at Boating magazine and Yachting magazine, where she rose to the position of senior editor. After enrolling in Columbia's graduate journalism program, she was employed as a reporter at TheSmokingGun.com, People Magazine, and OK! Magazine. She was also employed by Golf World magazine at one point. While at OK! Magazine, she began appearing as a guest correspondent on CNN and MSNBC, where she became a mainstay on the Joe Scarborough-hosted programs Scarborough Country and Morning Joe.

In October 2007, Hazlett left OK! to take over "The Scoop" column on msnbc.com, replacing Jeannette Walls. The column features entertainment-news items, culled from original reporting and other media sources. It also features reviews and plugs for movies, TV shows, and other media productions that Hazlett considers noteworthy. Her first column was published on October 29, 2007.

In January 2009, Hazlett drew flak for criticizing Frozen River, an indie film that she claimed would not draw ratings for the Oscars and calling fans of the film "effete."

On April 25, 2010, the column was formally moved to todayshow.com, although it still continued to appear on the MSNBC website. On August 12, 2010, it was converted from a daily-column format to a weekday blog, with multiple entries per day.

Hazlett frequently appears on MSNBC and The Today Show as an entertainment correspondent. She is currently a regular on Tamron Hall's 2PM hour on MSNBC Live. A L'Oréal-sponsored segment discussing her latest "The Scoop" column was a regular feature on MSNBC's Morning Joe from October 2007 through July 2009, when the program abruptly discontinued it. No official explanation was given for Hazlett being dropped from the show, and L'Oréal's sponsored ad spots continued for several weeks afterward.

Hazlett was the substitute host for The Ron Reagan Show on Air America Radio during the week of June 1, 2009. She also occasionally appeared on the program to discuss entertainment news.

On September 8, 2011 Hazlett publicly announced that she was expecting a baby. She did not name the father, however according to her Facebook page, she is in a relationship with Steven Marrs, president of Branded Pictures.

On January 12, 2012, Hazlett gave birth to a daughter, Sawyer Ruth.
