= Owen Scheetz =

American baseball player (1913-1994)

- Pitcher
- Born: December 24, 1913; Baltic, Ohio, U.S.
- Died: September 28, 1994 (aged 80); Kirkersville, Ohio, U.S.
- Batted: Right Threw: Right

MLB debut
- April 22, 1943, for the Washington Senators

Last MLB appearance
- May 9, 1943, for the Washington Senators

MLB statistics
- Games played: 6
- Earned run average: 7.00
- Strikeouts: 5
- Stats at Baseball Reference

Teams
- Washington Senators (1943)

Owen Franklin Scheetz (December 24, 1913 – September 28, 1994) was an American professional baseball pitcher who appeared in six games with the Washington Senators of Major League Baseball during the 1943 season. A native of Baltic, Ohio, Scheetz played professionally for 13 seasons (1935–47) and won 137 games in minor league baseball. He was a right-hander who stood 6 feet (1.8 m) tall and weighed 190 pounds (86 kg).

All of Scheetz' six games pitched for Washington came in a relief role during the opening weeks of the wartime 1943 season. He worked in nine full innings pitched, allowed 16 hits, four bases on balls, and seven runs, all of them earned, for an ERA of 7.00. He fanned five and earned no decisions. In the last wartime baseball season, 1945, Scheetz led the American Association with 19 victories (losing eight decisions), and compiled an ERA of 1.95.
