= Sean Hickey (American football) =

American football player (born 1991)

No. 61, 64, 71, 66, 60, 63, 68
- Position: Offensive tackle

Personal information
- Born: September 29, 1991 (age 35); Murrysville, Pennsylvania
- Listed height: 6 ft 6 in (1.98 m)
- Listed weight: 306 lb (139 kg)

Career information
- High school: Franklin Regional (Murrysville, Pennsylvania)
- College: Syracuse
- NFL draft: 2015: undrafted

Career history
- New Orleans Saints (2015)*; New England Patriots (2015)*; New York Jets (2016)*; Minnesota Vikings (2016)*; Miami Dolphins (2017–2018)*; Jacksonville Jaguars (2018)*; St. Louis BattleHawks (2020)
- * Offseason or practice squad member only
- Stats at Pro Football Reference

Sean Michael Hickey (born September 29, 1991) is an American former football offensive tackle. He played college football at Syracuse.

== College career ==
Hickey started 38 straight games for the Syracuse Orange at left tackle during his college career.

== Professional career ==
=== New Orleans Saints ===
Hickey signed with the New Orleans Saints as an undrafted free agent on May 4, 2015. He was waived on September 5, 2015, and was signed to the practice squad the next day, only to be released the following week.

=== New England Patriots ===
On October 1, 2015, Hickey was signed to the New England Patriots' practice squad. He was released on October 9, 2015.

=== New York Jets ===
On January 19, 2016, Hickey was signed by the New York Jets, but was released on May 6, 2016.

=== Minnesota Vikings ===
On July 27, 2016, Hickey was signed by the Minnesota Vikings. He was waived on August 30, 2016, and later re-signed to the practice squad on September 27, 2016. He spent time on and off the Vikings' practice squad before being released on December 3, 2016.

=== Miami Dolphins ===
On August 15, 2017, Hickey was signed by the Miami Dolphins. He was waived on September 2, 2017, and was signed to the Dolphins' practice squad the next day. He signed a reserve/future contract with the Dolphins on January 1, 2018. He was waived on May 29, 2018.

=== Jacksonville Jaguars ===
On June 14, 2018, Hickey signed with the Jacksonville Jaguars. He was waived/injured on July 23, 2018, and was placed on injured reserve. He was released on August 1, 2018.

=== St. Louis BattleHawks ===
Hickey signed with the St. Louis BattleHawks of the XFL during mini-camp in December 2019. He was placed on injured reserve on January 17, 2020. He had his contract terminated when the league suspended operations on April 10, 2020.
