= Delmont, Pennsylvania =

Borough in Pennsylvania, US

- Borough
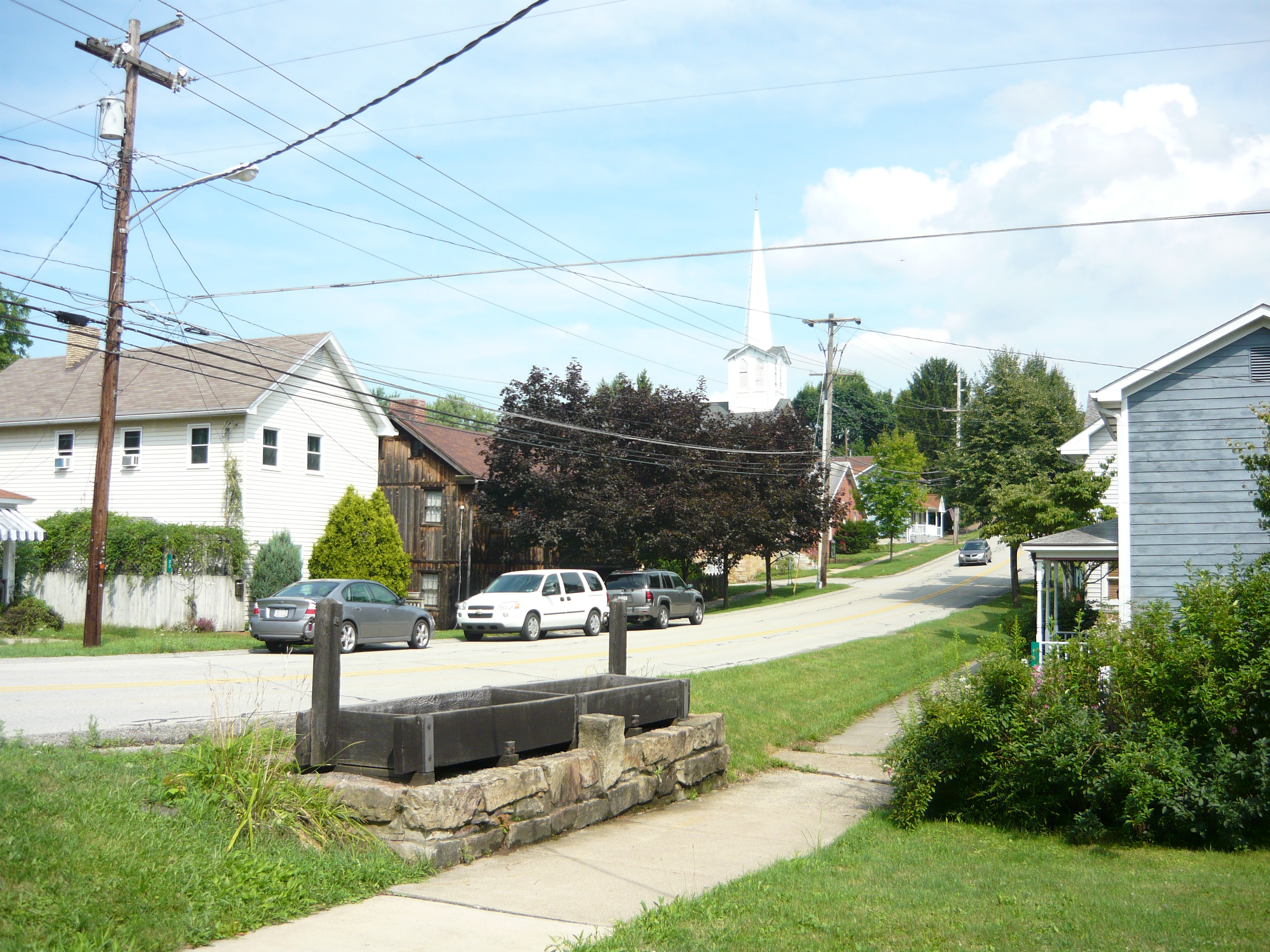
- Historic water trough on East Pittsburgh Street in Delmont

- Location of Delmont in Westmoreland County, Pennsylvania (left) and of Westmoreland County in Pennsylvania (right)

- Location within Pennsylvania
- Coordinates: 40°24′47″N 79°34′17″W
- Country: United States
- State: Pennsylvania
- County: Westmoreland
- Settled: 1814
- Incorporated: 1833

Government
  - Type: Borough Council

Area
  - Total: 1.05 sq mi (2.73 km^{2})
  - Land: 1.05 sq mi (2.73 km^{2})
  - Water: 0 sq mi (0.00 km^{2})
- Elevation: 1,260 ft (380 m)

Population (2020)
  - Total: 2,596
  - Density: 2,458.4/sq mi (949.19/km^{2})
- Time zone: UTC-5 (Eastern (EST))
  - Summer (DST): UTC-4 (EDT)
- Zip Code: 15626
- FIPS code: 42-18768
- Website: Delmont's website

Delmont is a borough in Westmoreland County, Pennsylvania. The population was 2,592 at the 2020 census.

== History ==
Delmont was initially known as New Salem. The 300 acres of land was warranted to William Wilson in 1784, and upon his arrival in 1785, he named the area New Salem. In 1812, a post office was established in New Salem, "Salem X Roads" (Salem Crossroads), Pennsylvania. Hugh Bigham was the first postmaster. Wilson continued to farm on the land until he died in 1796.

After Wilson died in 1796, his estate was divided between his sons, Thomas and George. It was not until 1812 that the patent was validated. Eventually, the family conveyed their deeds to Thomas, who became the property's sole owner. Thomas divided the property into 48 lots to form a crossroads village. Thomas Wilson designed the town around a watering trough built in 1810 by Hugh Bigham. The watering trough was initially known as the running pump. The watering trough was connected with wooden pipes to a big Spring that's never known to run dry. In 1814, 48 lots were auctioned off two days before Christmas to form a crossroads town. As the area developed, the town was referred to locally as Salem Crossroads.

On April 8, 1833, the town was incorporated as "New Salem Borough." The mailing address was Salem Crossroads until 1871 when town postmaster Zachariah Zimmerman changed it to Delmont. The town and the post office carried two different names until May 16, 1967, when residents voted to change the borough's name to Delmont after a promotional campaign by then-Mayor Franklin Mangery. Major navigational roads were built through the area in the late 18th century, and local Route 66 was built in 1800. The East-West Northern Turnpike was completed in 1819, linking Philadelphia to Pittsburgh. Delmont was a busy stagecoach stop boasting at one time five stage coach lines through the village. Travelers would stop, tired and hungry, and patronize the several inns and taverns in town. In 1853, the Pennsylvania Railroad was completed through Westmoreland County to Pittsburgh. This was a faster, more economical way to travel. In 1855, the last stagecoach passed through the crossroads village, ending the stagecoach era for the crossroads town.

Several areas and businesses in and around the borough still carry the Salem reference. Others refer to "Cloverleaf," which referred to the interchange at Routes 22 and 66, formerly a "cloverleaf" style exchange. It was changed to a single-point diamond interchange in 2000.

In the late 1970s, the Salem Crossroads Historical Restoration Society worked to maintain the local history and restore the area. As a result of its efforts, the National Register of Historic Places listed the Salem Crossroads Historic District in 1978. In 1980, the society purchased Shields Farm. The farm hosts an annual Apple' N Arts festival during the first week of October; the festival held a 40th-anniversary event in 2022.

The society disbanded at some point after its initial accomplishments. Downtown Delmont lost some businesses with the opening of chain retailers along the U.S. Route 22 corridor. Residents have discussed ways to reinvest in downtown Delmont and focus again on the town's historic resources.

Salem Township and Delmont, a book about the area's history by writer Tracy Searight, was published in 2012.

== Geography ==
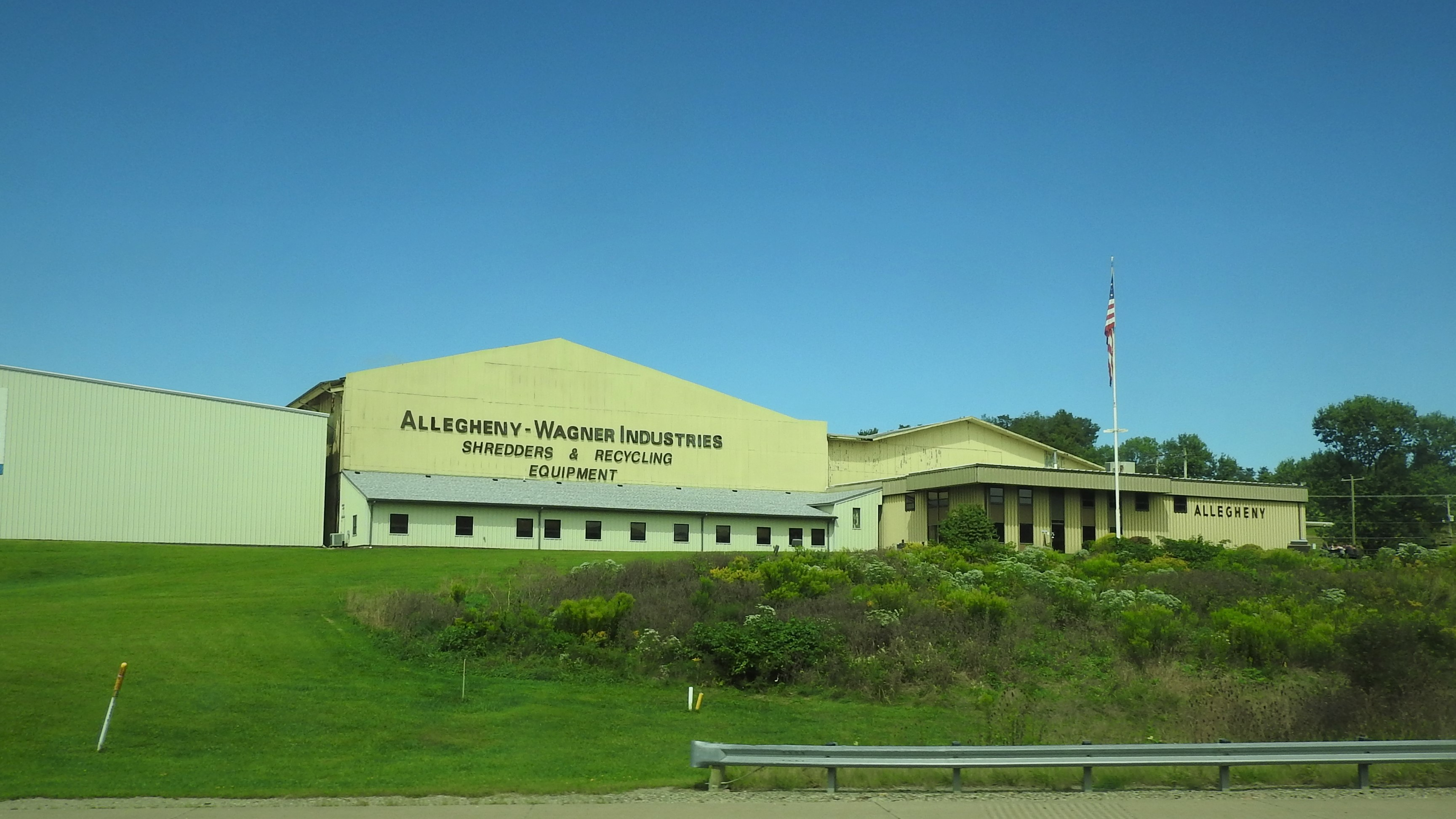
Allegheny-Wagner Industries on US Route 22

Delmont is located at 40°24′47″N 79°34′17″W (40.412971, -79.571433). According to the U.S. Census Bureau, the borough has a total area of 1.1 square miles (2.8 km^{2}), all land. Delmont has been assigned the ZIP Code 15626.

== Demographics ==
Historical population
Census	Pop.	Note	%±
1850	299		—
1860	419		40.1%
1870	448		6.9%
1880	440		−1.8%
1890	311		−29.3%
1900	381		22.5%
1910	424		11.3%
1920	671		58.3%
1930	721		7.5%
1940	705		−2.2%
1950	695		−1.4%
1960	1,313		88.9%
1970	1,934		47.3%
1980	2,159		11.6%
1990	2,041		−5.5%
2000	2,497		22.3%
2010	2,686		7.6%
2020	2,596		−3.4%
2021 (est.)	2,569	▼	−1.0%

As of the census of 2000, there were 2,497 people, 1,070 households, and 714 families residing in the borough. The population density was 2,333.1 inhabitants per square mile (900.8/km^{2}). There were 1,139 housing units at an average density of 1,064.2 per square mile (410.9/km^{2}). The racial makeup of the borough was 97.96% White, 0.52% African American, 0.04% Native American, 0.44% Asian, 0.04% from other races, and 1.00% from two or more races. Hispanic or Latino of any race were 0.24% of the population.

There were 1,070 households, of which 31.0% had children under 18 living with them, 55.4% were married couples living together, 9.3% had a female householder with no husband present, and 33.2% were non-families. 29.9% of all households were made up of individuals, and 12.1% had someone living alone who was 65 years of age or older. The average household size was 2.33, and the average family size was 2.91.

The borough's population was spread out, with 24.4% under 18, 6.2% from 18 to 24, 31.0% from 25 to 44, 24.7% from 45 to 64, and 13.7% who were 65 years of age or older. The median age was 39 years. For every 100 females, there were 92.2 males. For every 100 females aged 18 and over, there were 88.2 males.

The median income for a household in the borough was $39,700, and the median income for a family was $52,056. Males had a median income of $39,097 versus $25,804 for females. The per capita income for the borough was $21,090. About 4.6% of families and 6.9% of the population were below the poverty line, including 7.1% of those under age 18 and 14.9% of those aged 65 or over.

== Education ==
Most primary and secondary education is provided by two school districts - Greensburg Salem, in Greensburg, and Franklin Regional, in Murrysville. Students to the south and east of the borough are generally assigned to Greensburg Salem, while the bulk of the students in the borough, and those who reside in the north and west portions, attend Franklin Regional.

The Franklin Regional district consists of three elementary schools (Sloan, Newlonsburg, Heritage), Franklin Regional Middle School, and Franklin Regional High School. The Greensburg-Salem District consists of three elementary schools (Metzgar, Nicely, Hutchinson), Greensburg-Salem Middle School, and Greensburg Salem High School.

== Roads ==
Aside from the historical genesis of the town as a toll intersection and stagecoach stop, one of Delmont's notable characteristics is that it is the meeting point of two major highways, U.S. Route 22 and State Route 66.

These roads were not directly intersected for many years but were linked by a cloverleaf interchange. Delmont became known for this interchange; many local merchants incorporated "Cloverleaf" into their business names. In 2000, the "cloverleaf" system was dismantled, and a single-point urban interchange was built in its place. This change was made to accommodate the widening of Route 22, one of Pennsylvania's most heavily traveled roads. The interchange on Route 22 marks the boundary between suburban Pittsburgh and the more rural foothills of the Appalachian Mountains.

Other notable roads within Delmont's borders include Old William Penn Highway, which begins at the termination of Pittsburgh Street, just west of Route 66, and Manor Road, which begins on the west side of Route 66 as well, just across from Greensburg Street, and runs from 66 through the southeastern portion of the 22/66 corridor until it reaches Route 22 outside of city limits, as 22 goes toward Export and Murrysville.

== Historical sites ==
- The watering trough provided 19th-century stagecoach horses water from a spring. The watering trough was disconnected from the big spring in the 1970s; it was refurbished by The Delmont Lions club and still stands today.
- Several buildings near the intersection of East Pittsburgh and Greensburg streets are historically relevant. The building at 1 West Pittsburgh Street is a notable historic building that formerly served as The First National Bank of Delmont and Mook's Hardware, among other stores. The Central Hotel is a historic building that served as lodging for early stagecoach passengers. This now serves as an office for several businesses. Other historic buildings near this block include the former Delmont firehouse and the current Agway building, which dates back to the late 1800s when it was a flour mill.
- Salem Evangelical Lutheran Church was constructed in 1868. Today, the church is nationally recognized as a historical place and still holds worship every Sunday morning.
- Jacob Earnest's home, built in 1825. Earnest was a descendant of Indiana Eve. He owned a gunsmith shop and was a woodcarver and rifle maker in the area. He also served on the city council.
- Eastview Union Cemetery. Those interred include Jimmy Ripple and Jacob Earnest.
- Riddle Cemetery, a private cemetery on Mark Drive near the former Apple Hill Playhouse. A small cemetery with the marked graves of a few settlers and some unmarked graves. It is believed that some Native American remains may also be buried there. The grounds are cared for by private residents; for several years, local Boy Scout troops tended this area.
- Robert Shields tannery, located on East Pittsburgh Street. Now a private home, this was once the Shields' tannery during the early days of New Salem.
- Shields Farm, frequently used for gatherings and recreation. The farm is the location of the Apple' N Arts Festival, "Christmas in Salem Crossroads", and Delmont Area Athletic Association (D.A.A.A.) recreational baseball and softball games.
- Apple Hill Playhouse hosted plays and theatrical performances, including theater productions and educational classes for children. The theater commemorated its 50th season in 2006. Apple Hill closed its doors in 2020; its future fate is unknown.
- The former Delmont Public School Building - a prominent building downtown. It held classes from 1898 until the early 1980s when Franklin Regional consolidated its elementary school buildings. Until recently, it was the home of the Delmont Public Library; it houses several offices, including some borough offices, and also hosts some classroom and meeting spaces.
- Delmont Public Library - after several decades in the former school building, a new library was built adjacent to nearby and opened in 2021.

== Recreation sites ==
- Center Ice Arena – an ice skating and recreational facility consisting of three NHL-size ice rinks, a skate shop, a party room, a conference area, a video arcade, and a fitness center. It hosts local high school and college hockey games and other events during the year.
- Newhouse Park – a recreational park with a walking/running path, two tennis courts, a basketball court, a deck hockey rink, a little league baseball field, and a standard-size baseball field.
- Kovalcik Park - includes a baseball field, tennis courts, and a small play area within the Surrey Farm housing development. While Surrey Farm homes all have Delmont addresses, Kovalcik Park is managed by the neighboring Municipality of Murrysville.
- Cloverleaf Golf Club – a 27-hole public golf course that accommodates outings and weekly leagues.
- Steel City Raceway – a professional motocross racetrack that hosts a variety of races throughout the year, including an AMA Motocross Championship.

== Sources ==
- Images in America: Salem Township and Delmont, Arcadia Publishing, October 2012. Author: Tracy Searight
