= Free Gospel Church =

Holiness Pentecostal denomination

- Classification: Protestant
- Orientation: Holiness Pentecostalism
- Polity: Connexionalism
- Origin: 1916
- Congregations: 48
- Tertiary institutions: 1
- Official website: fgbi.org

The Free Gospel Church is a Holiness Pentecostal denomination of Christianity. It is headquartered in Export, Pennsylvania, with churches and orphanages in the United States, Philippines, India, Taiwan, and Sierra Leone.

The United Free Gospel and Missionary Society was founded in 1916 by Frank Casley and William Casley. The work became known as the Free Gospel Church in 1958. The Free Gospel Church adheres to Holiness Pentecostal theology, affirming three works of grace: (1) New Birth, (2) entire sanctification, and (3) Baptism with the Holy Spirit. It teaches the doctrine of outward holiness as well, which is manifested in godly conduct, sober speech and the wearing of modest clothing.

The Free Gospel Church operates the Free Gospel Bible Institute (FGBI) in Murrysville, Pennsylvania, which serves as a Bible college for Holiness Pentecostals from various parts of the world. A camp meeting is held annually in Export, Pennsylvania at the denomination's campground.

== See also ==
- Apostolic Faith Church, a Holiness Pentecostal denomination similar to the Free Gospel Church
