= Raber's Almanac =

Raber's New American Almanac is an almanac used by many Old Order Amish, published by an Amish bookstore in Baltic, Ohio. The German edition has been published since 1930, and the English edition since the 1970s; both have a plain black and white cover. It includes a register of all the Amish ministers in America, listed by state, community, and church district, a calendar of Bible verses and hymns which will be used in worship services, and traditional weather and planting forecasts.

== Sources ==
- "For the Amish, almanacs help keep the year in order." Robert Rhodes, Mennonite Weekly Review.
- "Almanacs long a part of American Anabaptist culture." Robert Rhodes Mennonite Weekly Review
