= Tom Ricketts (American football) =

American football player (born 1965)

No. 71, 68, 64
- Positions: Tackle, guard

Personal information
- Born: November 21, 1965 (age 60); Pittsburgh, Pennsylvania, U.S.
- Listed height: 6 ft 5 in (1.96 m)
- Listed weight: 305 lb (138 kg)

Career information
- High school: Franklin Regional (Murrysville, Pennsylvania)
- College: Pittsburgh
- NFL draft: 1989: 1st round, 24th overall pick

Career history
- Pittsburgh Steelers (1989–1991); Indianapolis Colts (1992); Kansas City Chiefs (1993); New Orleans Saints (1994)

Career NFL statistics
- Games played: 53
- Games started: 15
- Stats at Pro Football Reference

Thomas Gordon Ricketts Jr. (born November 21, 1965) is an American former professional football player who was an offensive tackle for five seasons in the National Football League (NFL). He played college football for the Pittsburgh Panthers and was selected by the Pittsburgh Steelers 24th overall in the first round of the 1989 NFL draft. He played in the NFL for the Steelers, Indianapolis Colts, and Kansas City Chiefs.
