= Steven Marrs =

American businessman

- Born: March 11, 1967 (age 59); Landstuhl, Germany
- Education: University of Florida
- Spouse: Courtney Hazlett (m. 2009; div. 2024)

Steven Marrs (born March 11, 1967, in Landstuhl, Germany) is the founder, President and Managing Partner of OutEast Entertainment, an independent multimedia entertainment studio.

== Career ==
Marrs was the co-founder, President & COO of Tribal DDB, a worldwide internet services company part of the Omnicom Group. Before Tribal DDB, he was a partner at an internet advertising agency and entertainment company, Blue Marble A.C.G.

Marrs was the founder and owner of Branded Pictures, formerly Brand Entertainment Studios, an independent cross-platform production and distribution company folded into Momentum Entertainment Group at its inception. He was the executive producer of such shows as NBC's World Music Awards, CW's Sean Combs presents Americas Party, and CBS' Christmas from Central Park as well as several cable, live event and internet shows, including Comedy Hall of Fame on ABC, Got Game on Spike, and Anatomy of An Awkward Situation.

Marrs was the Founder and President of Momentum Entertainment Group, part of the Momentum Worldwide group of companies owned by Interpublic Group. Under Marrs' leadership, MEG launched scripted, reality and special series and programs, including Rogue, Full Circle, Croc Files, How Sweet the Sound, the award-winning PG&E Energy House Calls Digital Series and Elite Model Look. In February 2013, Marrs and Momentum parted ways.

OutEast Entertainment was launched in November 2013 with its first script-to-series drama project with The CW Network, titled The Cover, and the scripted drama series titled Ashley Madison. The company announced its first foray into the unscripted television business by acquiring the Dutch format Fish Tales.

== Early life ==
Raised in New Orleans, Louisiana, Marrs is a 1991 graduate of the University of Florida, where he majored in advertising. He is the son of Cynthia H. Marrs, a noted New Orleans entrepreneur.
