= Salem Crossroads Historic District =

Historic district in Pennsylvania, United States

- U.S. National Register of Historic Places
- U.S. Historic district
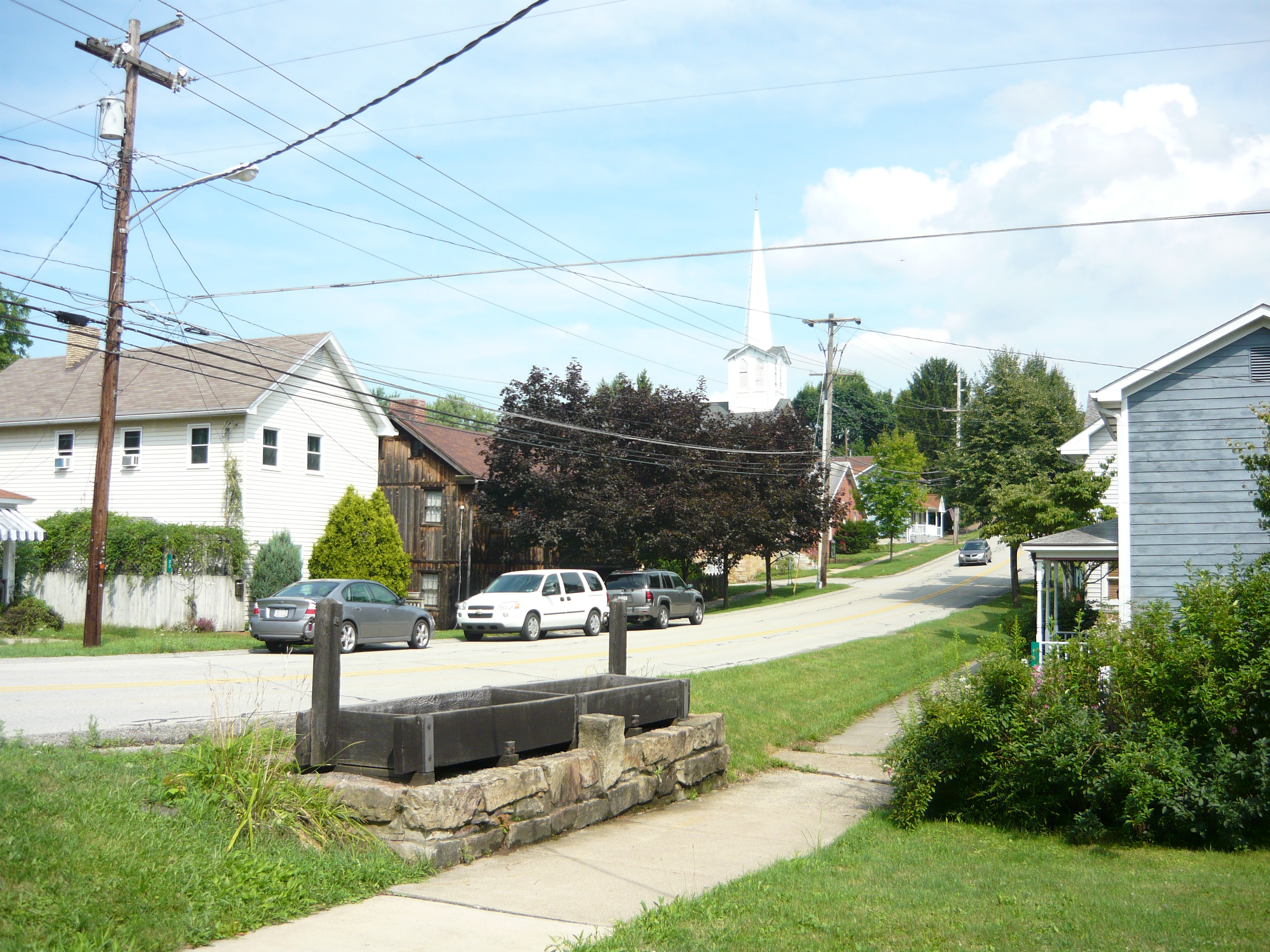
- Historic water trough on East Pittsburgh Street

- Location within Pennsylvania Location within the United States
- Location: Pittsburgh and Greenburg Sts., Delmont, Pennsylvania
- Coordinates: 40°24′44″N 79°34′10″W
- Area: 20 acres (8.1 ha)
- Architectural style: Greek Revival, Italianate
- NRHP reference No.: 78002484
- Added to NRHP: September 18, 1978

Salem Crossroads Historic District is a national historic district located at Delmont, Westmoreland County, Pennsylvania. It encompasses 64 contributing buildings in the historic core of Delmont, originally called Salem Crossroads. The district includes buildings largely constructed between 1830 and 1870. It includes four log houses, numerous Greek Revival style buildings, the Central Hotel, a Gothic Revival style church, feed mill, wagon shop, livery stable, brickyard, blacksmith shop, and an old Ford Garage, dated to the 1920s. Plans to restore the area as a living museum never materialized.

It was added to the National Register of Historic Places in 1978.
