= Export, Pennsylvania =

Borough in Pennsylvania, US

- Borough
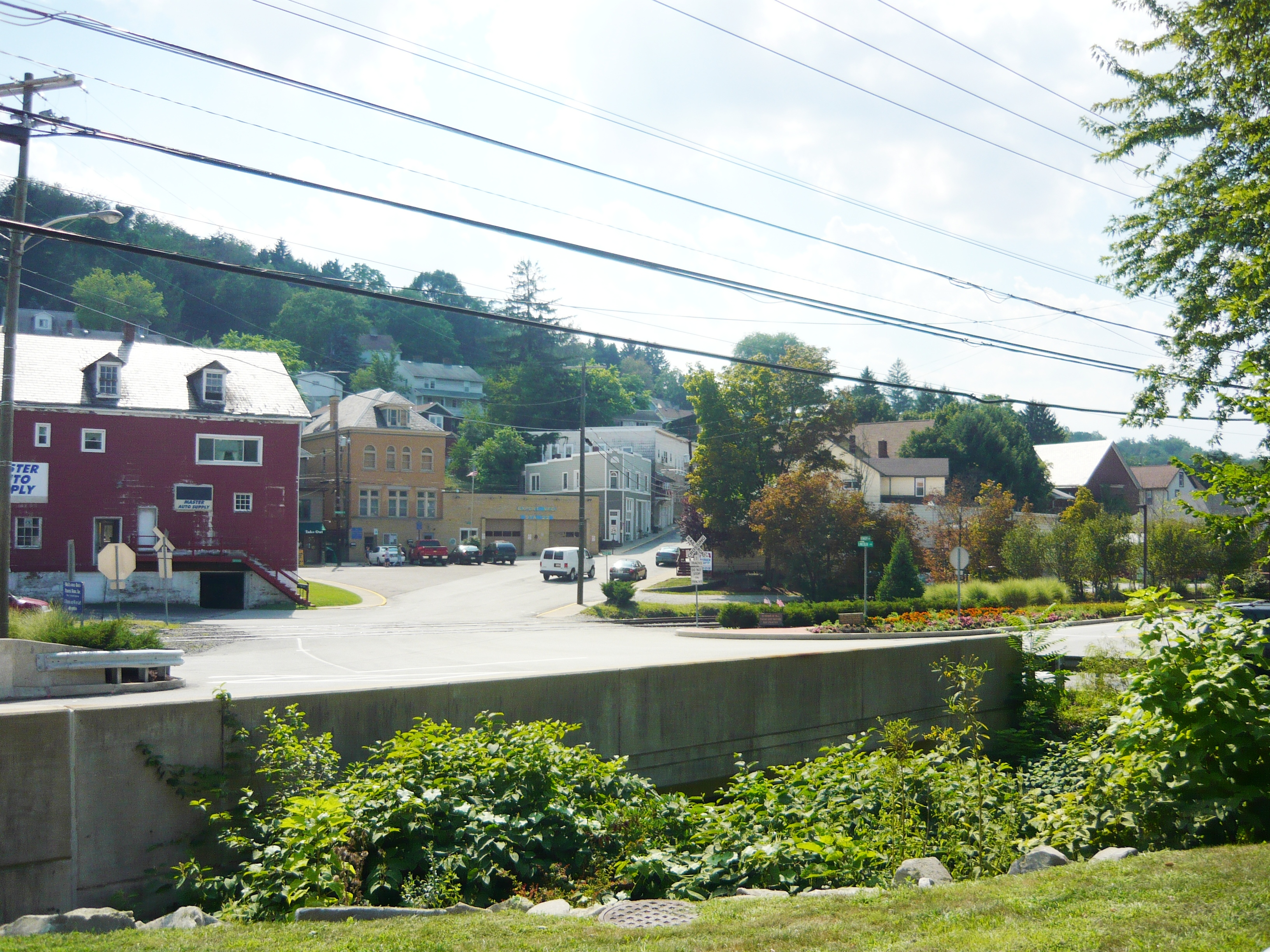
- Export's business district

- Flag Seal

- Location of Export in Westmoreland County, Pennsylvania

- Location within Pennsylvania
- Coordinates: 40°24′59″N 79°37′25″W
- Country: United States
- State: Pennsylvania
- County: Westmoreland
- Incorporated: November 11, 1911

Government
  - Type: Borough council

Area
  - Total: 0.40 sq mi (1.04 km^{2})
  - Land: 0.40 sq mi (1.04 km^{2})
  - Water: 0 sq mi (0.00 km^{2})
- Elevation: 1,027 ft (313 m)

Population (2020)
  - Total: 894
  - Density: 2,216.1/sq mi (855.66/km^{2})
- Time zone: UTC−5 (Eastern (EST))
  - Summer (DST): UTC−4 (EDT)
- ZIP Code: 15632
- Area codes: 724, 878
- FIPS code: 42-24432
- Website: exportpennsylvania.com

Export is a borough in Westmoreland County, Pennsylvania, United States, surrounded entirely by the municipality of Murrysville. The population was 893 at the 2020 census.

== History ==
A post office called Export has been in operation since 1892. The borough was so named because coal was once mined in and exported from the town.

The remains of Westmoreland Coal Company's South (#2) mine are still visible behind the District Court building in Export. A 2018 project unearthed three entrances. A fourth entrance was rediscovered in January 2019 by Michael Mance and Lou Corsi.

== Geography ==
Export is located at 40°24′59″N 79°37′25″W (40.416251, -79.623679).

According to the United States Census Bureau, the borough has a total area of 0.4 square miles (1.0 km^{2}), all land.

== Education ==
Export is within the Franklin Regional School District. The district consists of two elementary schools (Intermediate and Primary), Franklin Regional Middle School, and Franklin Regional High School. Export is also home to Free Gospel Bible Institute, an international Ministerial and Missionary College for Holiness Pentecostals founded in 1958.

== Demographics ==
Historical population
Census	Pop.	Note	%±
1920	2,596		—
1930	2,184		−15.9%
1940	1,990		−8.9%
1950	1,690		−15.1%
1960	1,518		−10.2%
1970	1,371		−9.7%
1980	1,143		−16.6%
1990	981		−14.2%
2000	895		−8.8%
2010	917		2.5%
2020	894		−2.5%
2021 (est.)	886	▼	−0.9%

As of the census of 2000, there were 895 people, 455 households, and 232 families living in the borough. The population density was 2,346.5 inhabitants per square mile (906.0/km^{2}). There were 513 housing units at an average density of 1,345.0 units per square mile (519.3 units/km^{2}). The racial makeup of the borough was 98.44% White, 0.11% African American, 0.67% Asian, and 0.78% from two or more races. Hispanic or Latino of any race were 0.56% of the population.

There were 455 households, out of which 22.0% had children under the age of 18 living with them, 32.1% were married couples living together, 12.1% had a female householder with no husband present, and 49.0% were non-families. 43.7% of all households were made up of individuals, and 21.1% had someone living alone who was 65 years of age or older. The average household size was 1.97 and the average family size was 2.74.

In the borough the age distribution of the population shows 18.8% under the age of 18, 6.0% from 18 to 24, 33.2% from 25 to 44, 18.8% from 45 to 64, and 23.2% who were 65 years of age or older. The median age was 41 years. For every 100 females, there were 90.4 males. For every 100 females age 18 and over, there were 85.9 males.

The median income for a household in the borough was $28,350, and the median income for a family was $36,591. Males had a median income of $30,677 versus $22,031 for females. The per capita income for the borough was $20,170. About 3.1% of families and 7.6% of the population were below the poverty line, including 2.2% of those under age 18 and 6.9% of those age 65 or over.

== Notable people ==
- Scott McKillop, NFL linebacker for the San Francisco 49ers
- Bob Moose, former Pittsburgh Pirates player.
- Jimmy Ripple, former New York Giants, Brooklyn Dodgers, Cincinnati Reds and Philadelphia Athletics player.
- Laura Howard, founder of the world's first goat milk ice cream company, Laloo's.

== Photo gallery ==
The following are the remains of Westmoreland Coal Company's South (#2) mine in Export.

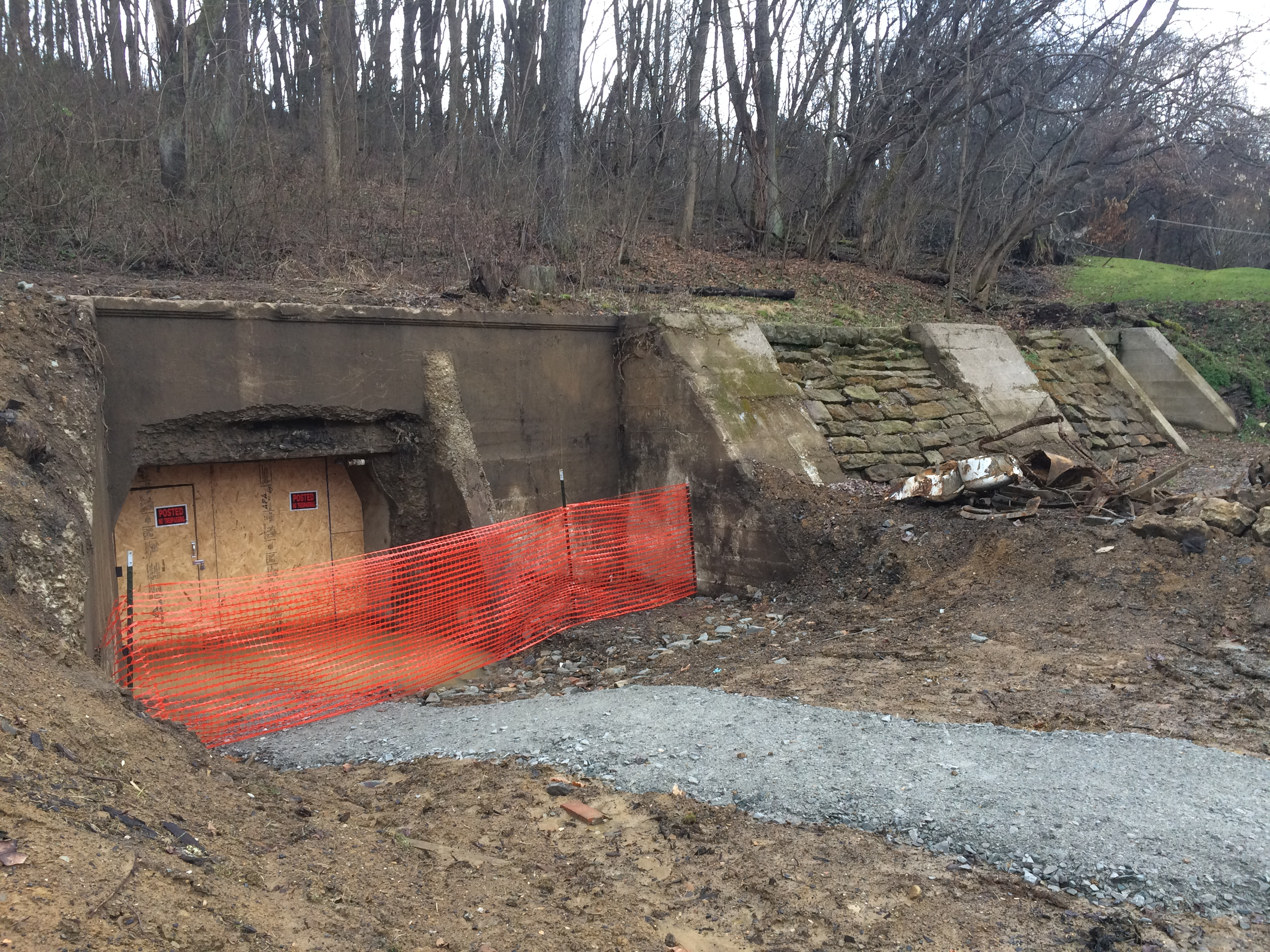
Entrances

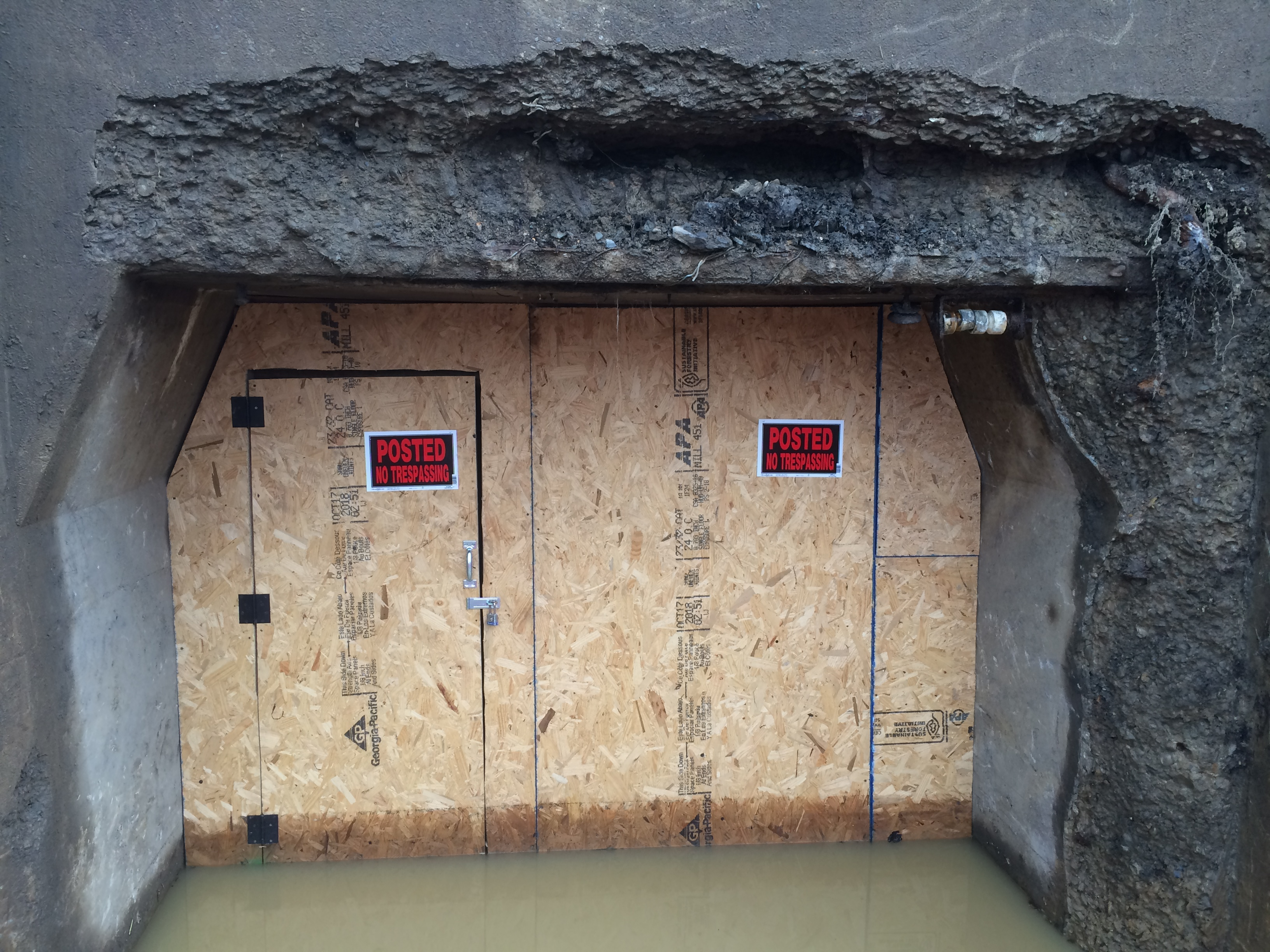
Entrance uncovered in January 2019

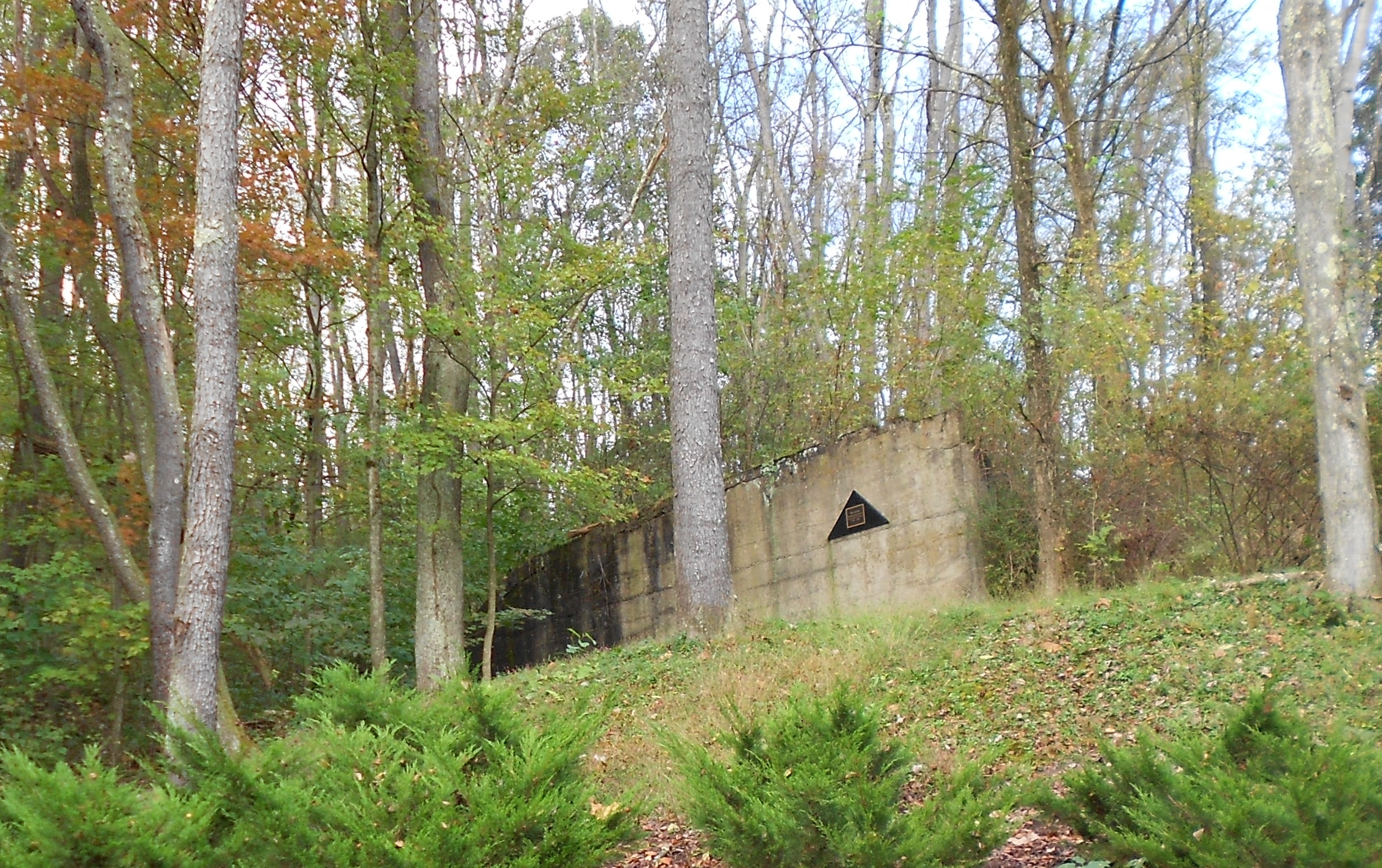
Fan house

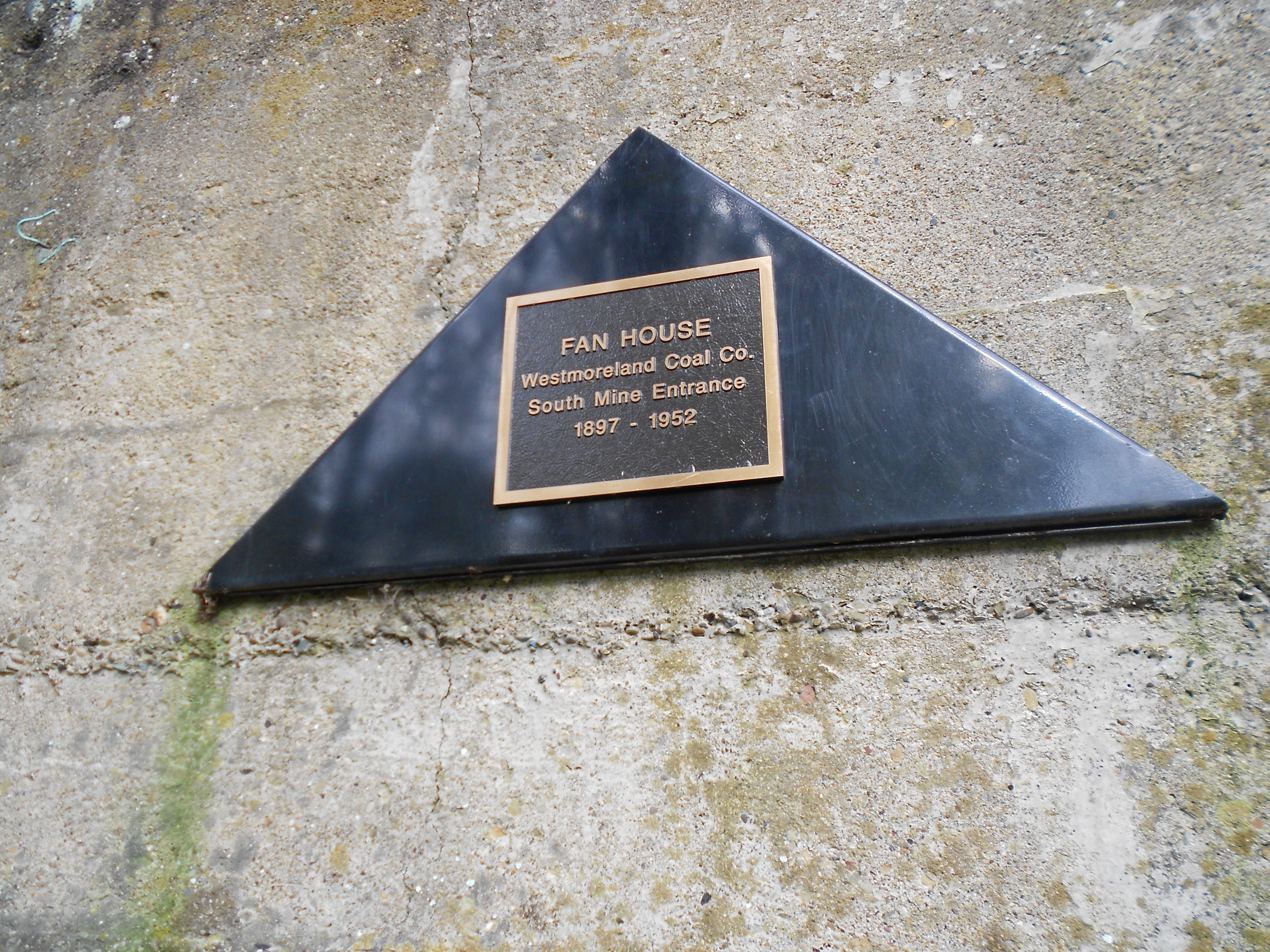
Plaque
