= Franklin Regional High School =

Public high school in Murrysville, Pennsylvania, U.S.

Franklin Regional Senior High School

Location
- 3200 School Road; Murrysville, Pennsylvania 15668; United States
- 40°25′45″N 79°40′8″W

Information
- Type: Public high school
- School district: Franklin Regional School District
- Superintendent: Gennaro Piraino
- Principal: Ron Suvak
- Teaching staff: 80.33 (FTE)
- Enrollment: 1,106 (2023-2024)
- Student to teacher ratio: 13.77
- Colors: Blue; Gold
- Athletics conference: PIAA District 7
- Mascot: Panthers
- USNWR ranking: 1067
- Website: highschool.frsdk12.org

Franklin Regional Senior High School is a public high school (grades 9–12) in Murrysville, Pennsylvania and is part of the Franklin Regional School District.

== History ==
On April 9, 2014, Franklin was the site of a mass stabbing and slashing incident that wounded 21 students and a security guard. Eight of the students were wounded seriously. A 16-year-old student, Alex Hribal, was arrested and charged with attempted homicide and aggravated assault. In January 2018, after pleading guilty to 21 counts of attempted homicide and aggravated assault, Alex Hribal was sentenced to 23.5 to 60 years in prison and fined $269,000 in restitution.

In June 2026, a school yearbook published an antisemitic quote referencing a Holocaust-denial slogan, after being approved by the yearbook advisor prior to publication.

== Athletics ==
Franklin offers the following sports through the Pennsylvania Interscholastic Athletic Association (District 7):

Franklin Sports
| Gender | Sport | Class |
|---|---|---|
| Boys | Baseball | AAAAA |
| Boys | Basketball | AAAAA |
| Boys | Cross Country | AAA |
| Boys | Football | AAAAA |
| Boys | Golf | AAA |
| Boys | Lacrosse | AA |
| Boys | Soccer | AAA |
| Boys | Swimming and Diving | AAA |
| Boys | Tennis | AAA |
| Boys | Track and Field | AAA |
| Boys | Wrestling | AAA |
| Girls | Basketball | AAAAA |
| Girls | Competitive Spirit | AAA |
| Girls | Cross Country | AAA |
| Girls | Golf | AAA |
| Girls | Lacrosse | AA |
| Girls | Soccer | AAA |
| Girls | Softball | AAAAA |
| Girls | Swimming and Diving | AAA |
| Girls | Tennis | AAA |
| Girls | Track and Field | AAA |
| Girls | Volleyball | AAA |

== Notable alumni ==
- Julie Benz – actress
- Courtney Hazlett – journalist
- Sean Hickey – American football player
- Spencer Lee – wrestler
- John Malecki – American football player
- John F. Meier – U.S. Navy aviator and rear admiral
- Tom Ricketts – American football player
- Manu Narayan – Broadway actor
- Jeremie Rehak– Major League Baseball umpire
- Brooke Hyland — Reality TV Star
- Paige Hyland — Reality TV Star
