= Mount Hope, Ohio =

Unincorporated community in Ohio, U.S.

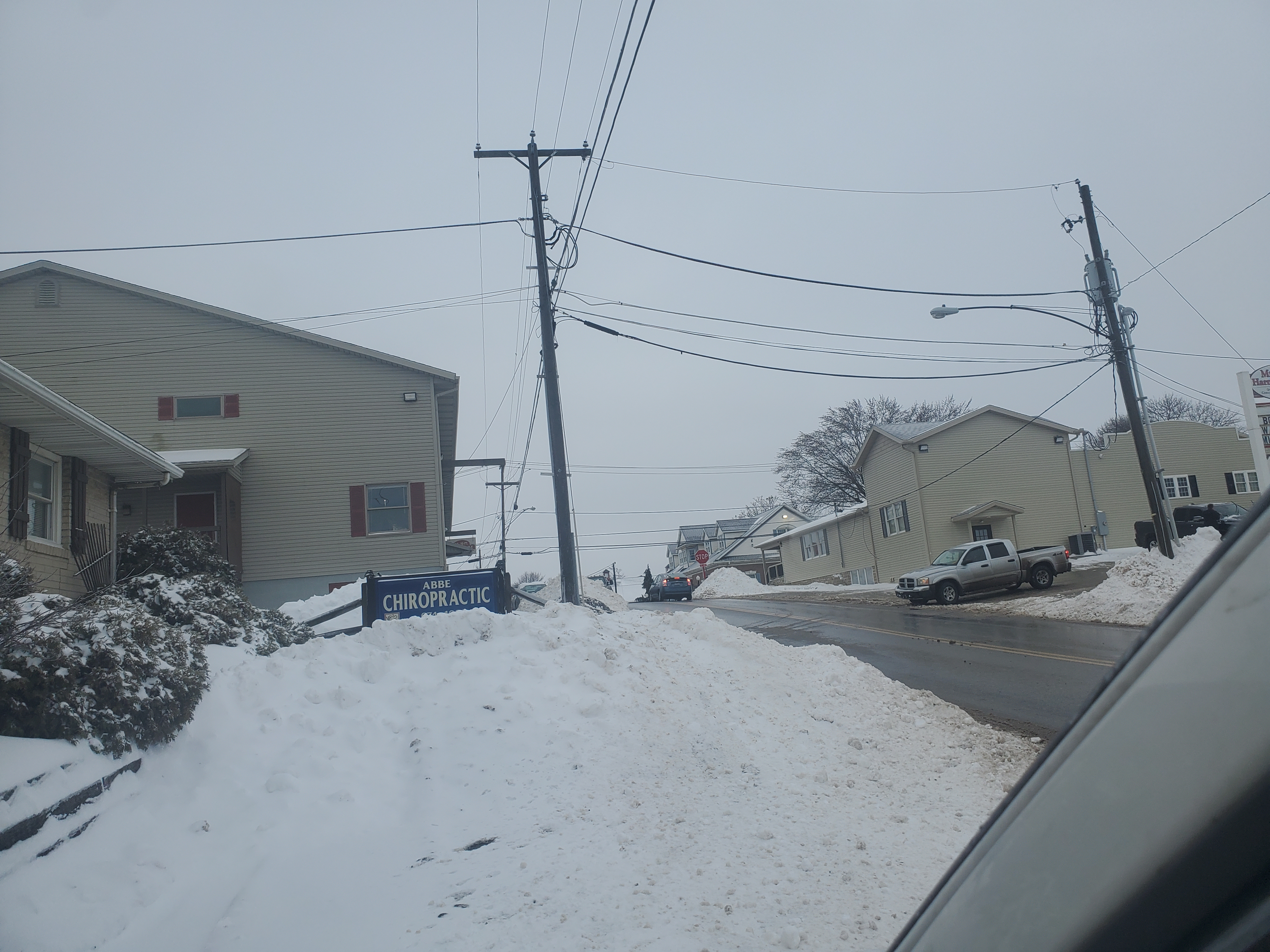
- Mount Hope in 2022

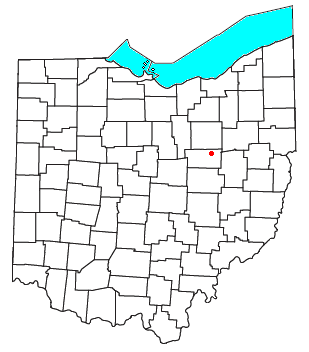
- Location of Mount Hope, Ohio
- Coordinates: 40°37′32″N 81°46′34″W
- Elevation: 380 m (1,247 ft)
- GNIS feature ID: 2805298

Mount Hope is an unincorporated community and census-designated place in eastern Salt Creek Township, Holmes County, Ohio, United States. At the 2020 census, Mount Hope had a population of 197.

Until April 13, 2024, a post office with the ZIP code 44660 was operational; however, due to the building lease expiring, local postal operations were temporarily relocated to the post office in the nearby village of Mount Eaton in Wayne County. In December 2025, a new location for the Mount Hope post office was selected.

Mount Hope lies along State Route 241.
