= Murrysville, Pennsylvania =

Municipality in Pennsylvania, US

- Home rule municipality
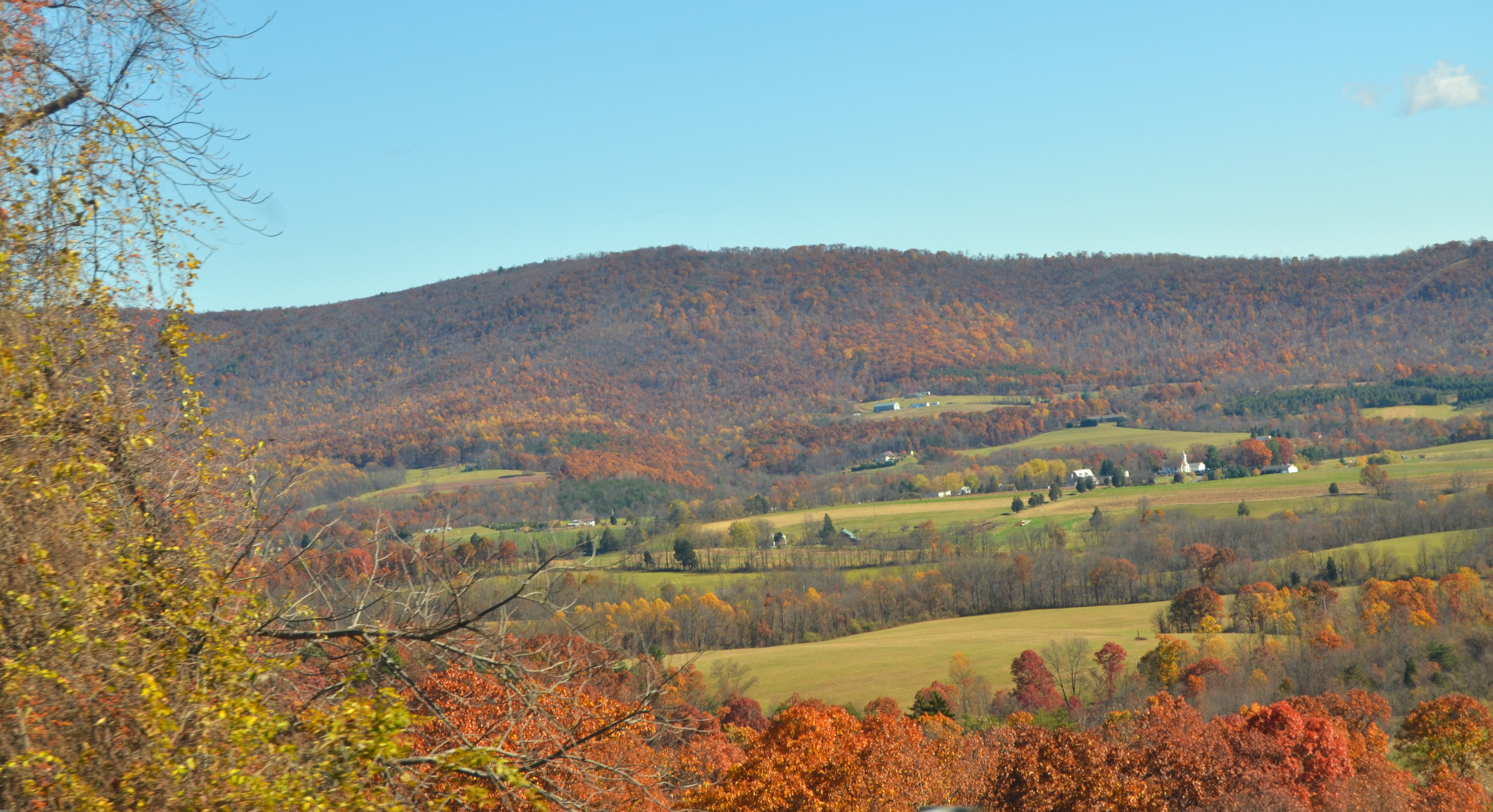
- Hills in Murrysville

- Flag Seal

- Location of Murrysville in Westmoreland County, Pennsylvania.

- Location within Pennsylvania Location within the United States
- Coordinates: 40°26′5″N 79°39′24″W
- Country: United States
- State: Pennsylvania
- County: Westmoreland
- Settled: 1788 (as Franklin Township)

Government
  - Mayor: Dayne F. Dice
  - Chief Administrator: Michael L. Nestico

Area
  - Total: 36.84 sq mi (95.41 km^{2})
  - Land: 36.83 sq mi (95.39 km^{2})
  - Water: 0.0077 sq mi (0.02 km^{2})
- Elevation: 1,110 ft (338.3 m)

Population (2020)
  - Total: 21,006
  - Density: 570.3/sq mi (220.21/km^{2})
- Time zone: UTC-5 (Eastern)
  - Summer (DST): UTC-4 (Eastern)
- ZIP code: 15668, 15632
- Area codes: 724, 412
- FIPS code: 42-52432
- Website: www.murrysville.com

The Municipality of Murrysville is a home rule municipality in Westmoreland County, Pennsylvania, United States. As of the 2020 United States census, the population was 21,006, making it one of the larger communities in the county. It is part of the Pittsburgh metropolitan area and is located approximately 20 miles east of Pittsburgh along U.S. Route 22.

== History ==
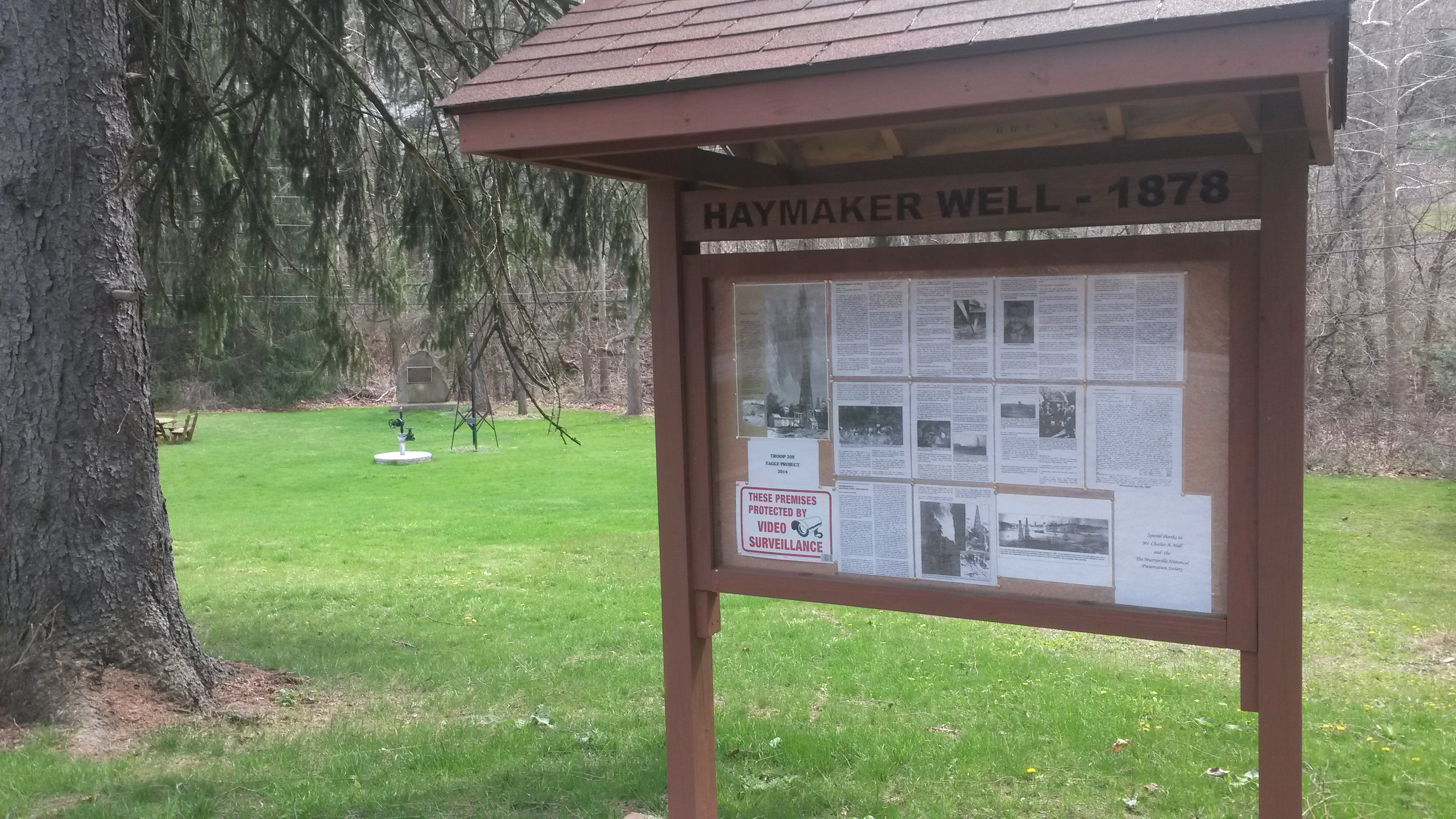
The approximate site where the Haymaker brothers struck natural gas in Murrysville on November 3, 1878

Murrysville was originally settled as Franklin Township in 1788 and underwent several name and structural changes before adopting a home rule charter in 1976, becoming the Municipality of Murrysville.

The area is historically significant for its early role in the development of the natural gas industry in the United States. In 1878, brothers Michael and Obediah Haymaker drilled what became one of the nation’s first commercial natural gas wells in Murrysville. The well produced vast quantities of natural gas and helped spur the formation of early gas companies, including operations that later contributed to the development of what became Sunoco and other regional utilities.

The Haymaker Gas Well was the nation's first commercial natural gas well. For some time, it remained the largest commercial gas well in the world. The well was drilled in 1878, and until a gas pipe line was attached to the well in 1883, approximately 35 million cubic feet of gas a day was released into the atmosphere, resulting in a total of about 60 billion cubic feet of natural gas released into the atmosphere from this single site. Murrysville was described in the first half of the 20th century as being "the center of a district dotted with gas wells, the first of which was bored in 1878; wild speculation in leases precipitated the open conflict known as the 'Haymaker Riots,' named for the speculator killed in one of them."

Since 1933, a large hillside “Murrysville tree sign” created by local Boy Scouts has spelled out the name "Murrysville" and functioned as a distinctive local landmark; the “Y” in the sign is said to point toward the original Haymaker well site. The sign is situated on a large hill as one enters the Municipality from the Murrysville–Monroeville border, near U.S. Route 22. In 1947, the sign was featured in "Ripley's Believe It Or Not" as the world's largest arboreal sign. (It is no longer the world's largest).

In 1977, Murrysville was designated the "Gateway to Westmoreland County" by Mayor Walt Dollman in conjunction with the Chamber of Commerce. In 2012, community leaders upgraded sign and landscaping elaborately at the main entrance at the Allegheny / Westmoreland border featuring this designation. As is shown at the introduction of this page, the Gateway designation is featured on the official Seal of the Municipality.

Murrysville became a home rule municipality in August 1976, when its electorate voted for a charter.

== Geography ==
Murrysville is located at 40°26′5″N 79°39′24″W (40.434828, -79.656724). It is roughly 20 miles east of Pittsburgh on U.S. Route 22, just east of the county line that separates Westmoreland and Allegheny counties. Murrysville is a control city on the sign for eastbound US 22 at the eastern end of I-376 in Monroeville.

According to the United States Census Bureau, the municipality covers an area of approximately 36.84 square miles (95.41 km²), nearly all land, with very minimal water surface. It lies in the western part of Westmoreland County, bordering Allegheny County to the west, and is composed of a mix of residential neighborhoods and rural landscapes.

Among the neighborhoods within Murrysville are Murrysville Heights, Heather Highlands, Franklin Estates, Settlers Ridge (The Ridge), Dunningtown, Newlonsburg, Ringertown, Sardis, and White Valley. Murrysville surrounds but does not include the Borough of Export, which is a separate municipal entity.

Murrysville has eight borders, including Upper Burrell Township to the north, Washington Township to the north and east, Salem Township to the south and southeast, Delmont to the southeast, Penn Township to the south, and the Allegheny County municipalities of Monroeville to the southwest and Plum to the west. The borough of Export is situated inside Murrysville in the south-southeast section.

== Demographics ==
Historical population
Census	Pop.	Note	%±
1880	81		—
1930	3,535		—
1940	3,797		7.4%
1950	4,937		30.0%
1960	8,517		72.5%
1970	12,244		43.8%
1980	16,036		31.0%
1990	17,240		7.5%
2000	18,872		9.5%
2010	20,079		6.4%
2020	21,006		4.6%
source:,

=== 2020 census ===
As of the 2020 census, Murrysville had a population of 21,006. The median age was 49.1 years. 20.3% of residents were under the age of 18 and 25.7% of residents were 65 years of age or older. For every 100 females, there were 97.0 males, and for every 100 females age 18 and over there were 95.0 males age 18 and over.

80.6% of residents lived in urban areas, while 19.4% lived in rural areas.

There were 8,323 households in Murrysville, of which 27.3% had children under the age of 18 living in them. Of all households, 63.8% were married-couple households, 12.1% were households with a male householder and no spouse or partner present, and 20.2% were households with a female householder and no spouse or partner present. About 23.7% of all households were made up of individuals and 14.3% had someone living alone who was 65 years of age or older.

There were 8,737 housing units, of which 4.7% were vacant. The homeowner vacancy rate was 1.3% and the rental vacancy rate was 7.4%.

Racial composition as of the 2020 census
Race	Number	Percent
White	18,642	88.7%
Black or African American	260	1.2%
American Indian and Alaska Native	30	0.1%
Asian	1,162	5.5%
Native Hawaiian and Other Pacific Islander	5	0.0%
Some other race	104	0.5%
Two or more races	803	3.8%
Hispanic or Latino (of any race)	374	1.8%

=== 2000 census ===
As of the 2000 census, there were 18,872 people, 7,083 households, and 5,630 families located in the municipality. The population density was 511.0 inhabitants per square mile (197.3/km^{2}). There were 7,396 housing units at an average density of 200.3 per square mile (77.3/km^{2}). The racial makeup of the Municipality was 95.38% White, 0.61% African American, 0.05% Native American, 3.28% Asian, 0.01% Pacific Islander, 0.16% from other races, and 0.50% from two or more races. Hispanic or Latino of any race were 0.56% of the population.

There were 7,083 households, out of which 34.5% had children under the age of 18 living with them, 71.8% were married couples living together, 5.5% had a female householder with no husband present, and 20.5% were non-families. 18.4% of all households were made up of individuals, and 9.0% had someone living alone who was 65 years of age or older. The average household size was 2.63 and the average family size was 3.01.

In the Municipality population was spread out, with 24.9% under the age of 18, 4.9% from 18 to 24, 24.3% from 25 to 44, 30.3% from 45 to 64, and 15.6% who were 65 years of age or older. The median age was 43 years. For every 100 females, there were 97.9 males. For every 100 females age 18 and over, there were 93.1 males.

The median income for a household in the Municipality was $64,071, and the median income for a family was $72,740. Males had a median income of $58,553 versus $32,567 for females. The per capita income for the Municipality was $32,017. About 2.2% of families and 2.8% of the population were below the poverty line, including 3.1% of those under age 18 and 3.9% of those age 65 or over.

== Government ==
Murrysville operates under a home rule charter adopted by voters in August 1976, transitioning from earlier township and borough statuses. The municipality is governed by a mayor, elected to two-year terms, and a seven-member council, elected to four-year terms.

Local government oversees municipal services, planning and zoning, and public works, with advisory boards and commissions supporting functions including parks, recreation, and environmental matters.

== Education ==
Murrysville is served by the Franklin Regional School District, which includes primary, intermediate, middle, and high schools. The district frequently ranks highly in regional academic performance evaluations and has a high graduation rate. The district's high school boasts a graduation rate of 99.3% compared to the national average for public high schools of 82% and is ranked #213 in Newsweek's 2016 "America's Top High Schools".

In addition to public schools, private educational options include Mother of Sorrows Catholic School, and the historically rooted Free Gospel Bible Institute is also located within the municipality.

== Parks and Recreation ==
Murrysville maintains an extensive parks and recreation system with more than 1,200 acres of parkland. Major parks include Murrysville Community Park, which features sports complexes, playground areas, and planned community amenities.

The Westmoreland Heritage Trail, a regional multi-use trail, passes through the municipality, providing recreational access to walking, cycling, and historical sites linked to former railroad corridors and industrial heritage.

Local amenities also include golf courses and community facilities like libraries and indoor recreation centers, contributing to year-round active lifestyles for residents.

== Economy and Infrastructure ==
Murrysville’s economy is a mix of residential, commercial, and service activities. The U.S. Route 22 corridor functions as a commercial hub, supporting retail, professional services, and light industry while many residents commute to the Pittsburgh metropolitan area.

Infrastructure includes major road connections to nearby urban centers, local utilities managed through municipal and county authorities, and community services that support operations across municipal departments.

== Culture and Community Life ==
Community events, recreational programming, and local library offerings contribute to civic engagement in Murrysville. Annual local festivals, parks programs, and historical society activities provide forums for community participation.

Historical organizations document and preserve local heritage, including early industrial history and landmark sites related to the natural gas industry.

== Notable people ==
- Mary Bach (born 1944), consumer rights activist
- Julie Benz (born 1972), actress
- Jeremiah Burrell (1815–1856), Western Pennsylvania lawyer and judge
- Bobby Engram (born 1973), Seattle Seahawks wide receiver; San Francisco 49ers assistant offensive coordinator
- Eli Evankovich (born 1982), PA House of Representatives, 54th District
- Tom Flynn (born 1962), defensive back for Green Bay Packers and New York Giants
- Josiah Given (1828–1908) attorney, soldier and Supreme Court justice of Iowa
- Spencer Lee (born 1998), Cadet and Junior World Champion in freestyle wrestling, three-time NCAA wrestling National Champion at the University of Iowa
- Ken Macha (born 1950), Milwaukee Brewers manager and major league third baseman
- Robert Moose (1947–1976), Pittsburgh Pirates, pitcher 1967–1976
- Manu Narayan (born 1973), actor
- Candace Otto (born 1980), Miss Pennsylvania 2003
- Maddie Ziegler (born 2002), dancer and actress
- Mackenzie Ziegler (born 2004), dancer, singer, model and actress
