= Garage door =

Large door on a garage that accommodates vehicles entering and exiting

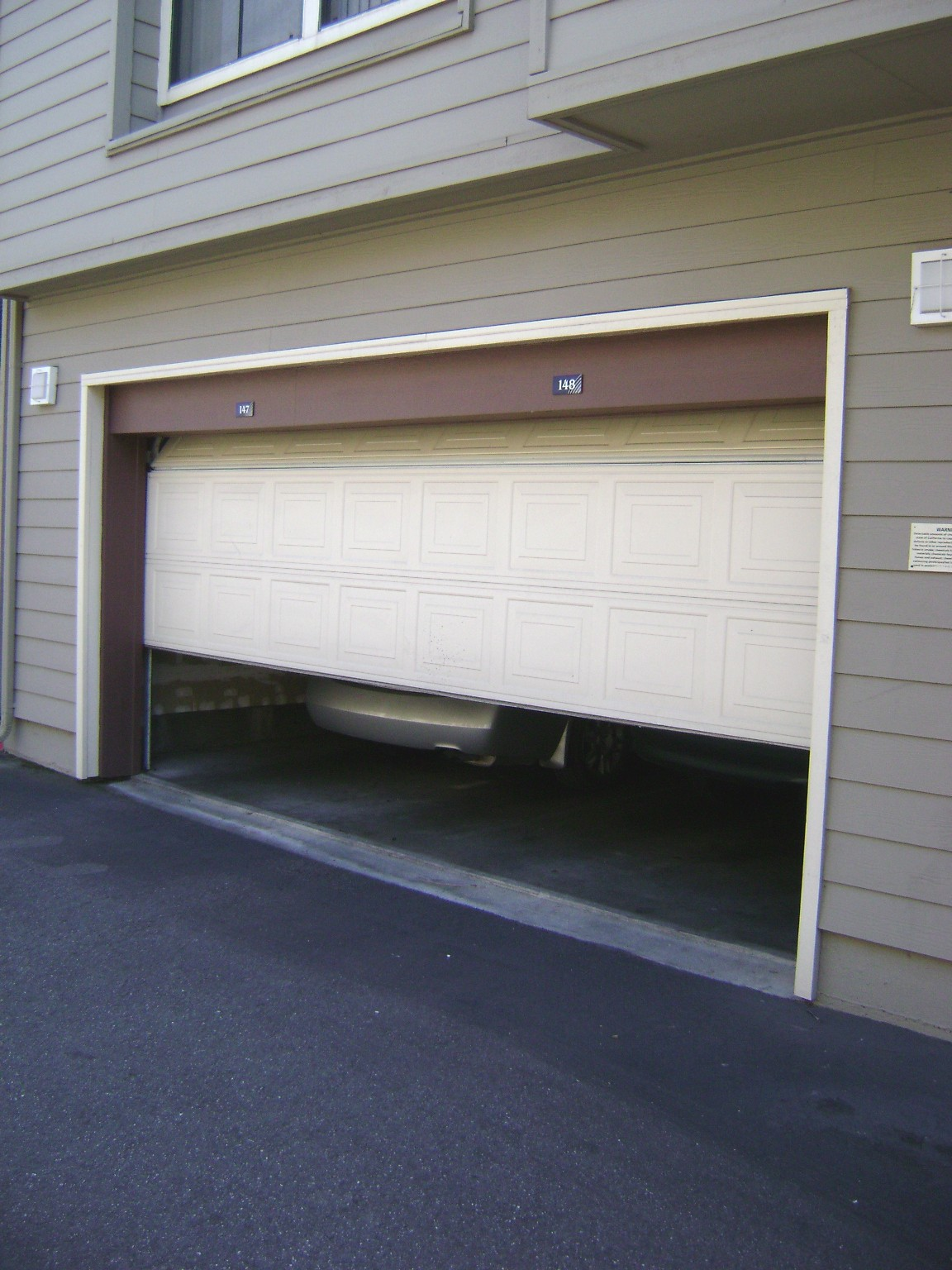
Modern sectional garage door

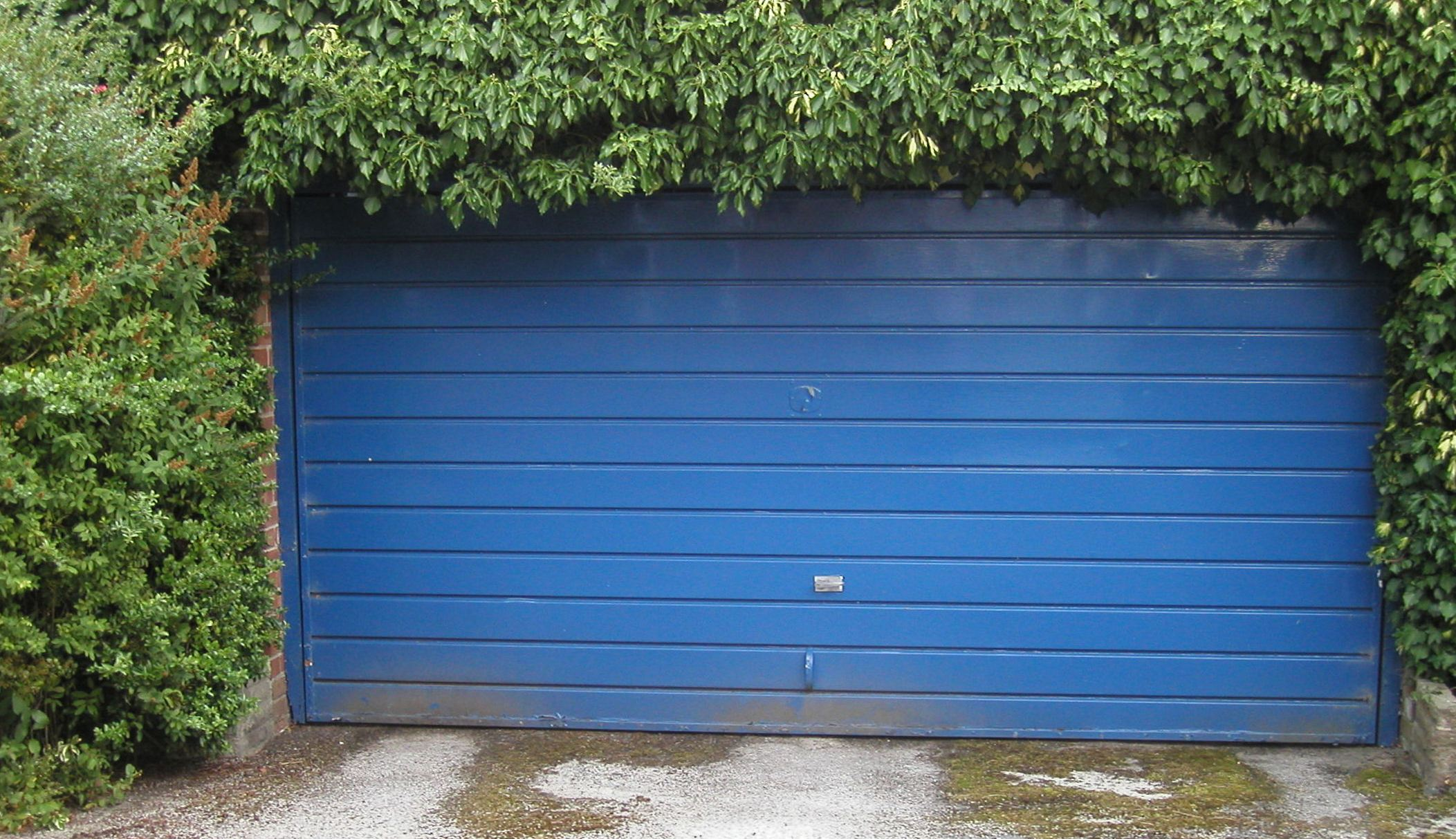
Traditional single-panel garage door

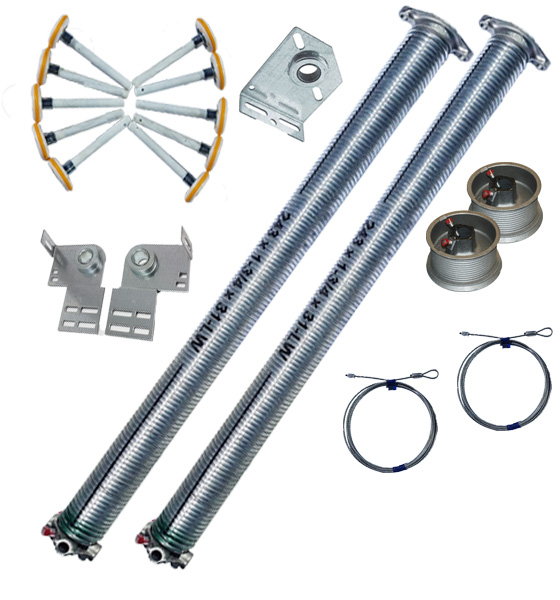
Garage door hardware

A garage door is a large door allowing access to a residential garage, commercial garage, or facility that opens either manually or via a motorized garage door opener. Garage doors are often large enough to accommodate cars and sometimes other vehicles or equipment. The operating mechanism is usually spring-loaded or counterbalanced to offset the door's weight and reduce the effort required to open and close it. Some doors can have no counterbalance mechanism and be fully motor-driven, often in commercial applications.

Garage doors are made of wood, metal, or fiberglass, and may be insulated to reduce heat loss. Less commonly, some garage doors slide or swing horizontally or vertically.

== Design ==
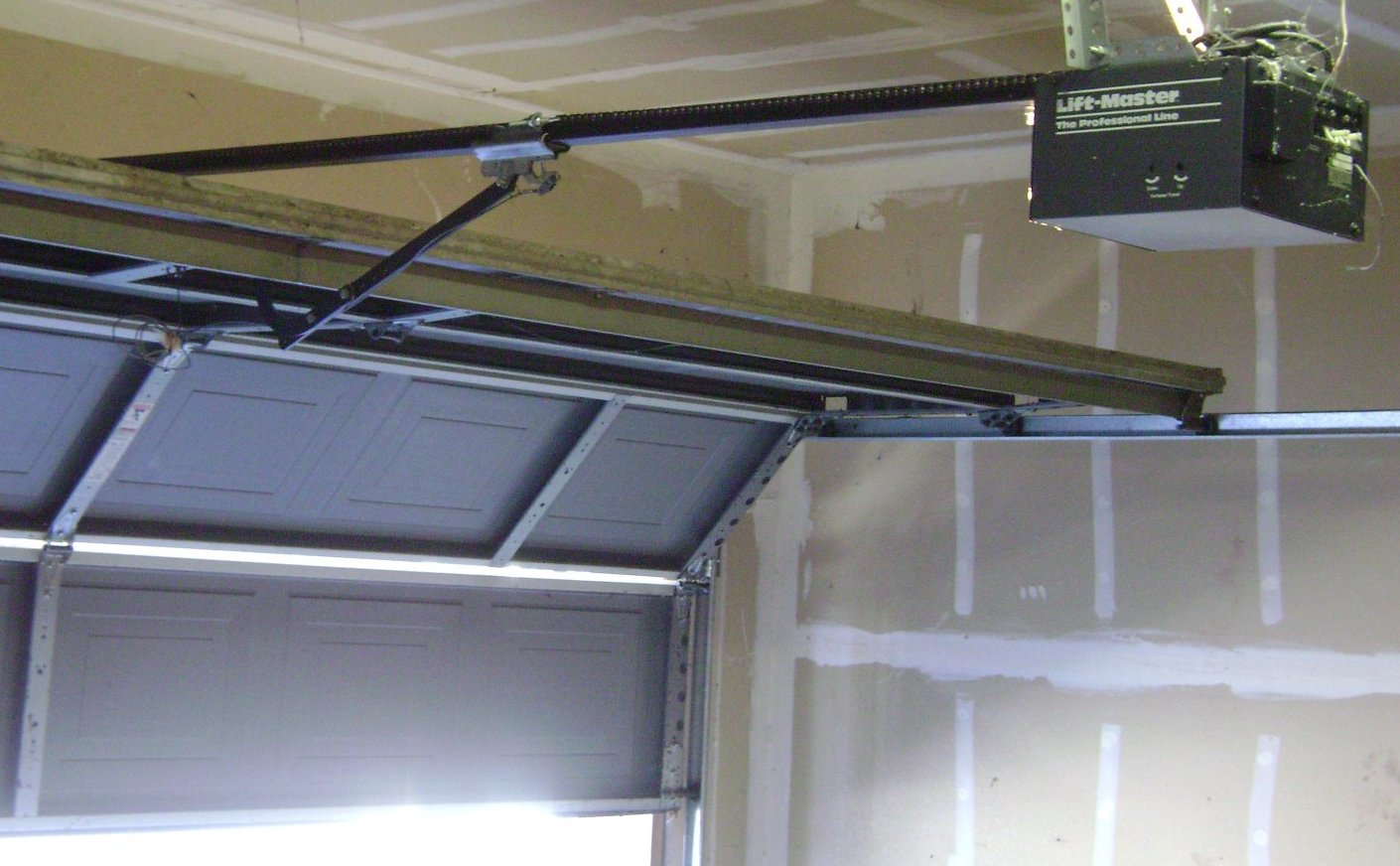
An electric garage door opener opens a residential sectional door

A typical version of an overhead garage door used in the past would have been built as a one-piece panel. The panel was mounted on each side to an unequal quadrilateral-style lifting mechanism. Newer overhead garage doors are now generally built as several panels that are hinged together and are guided by rollers along tracks on each side. The weight of the door may be 400 lb (180 kg) or more, but is balanced by either a torsion spring system or a pair of extension springs, to make the door seem light when a person lifts it.

Garage doors can be made of many materials, including steel, aluminum, wood, copper, glass, PVC, and polyethylene. Some manufacturers incorporate polyurethane foam insulation within the door panel(s).

A garage door opener is a motorized mechanism for opening garage doors. It can be activated with a remote control, a wall-mounted button, or a keypad for convenience, safety, and security.

=== Materials ===
Sectional steel doors with exterior cladding, in the style of old carriage house doors

Wooden garage doors offer aesthetic appeal, but are high-maintenance and may be expensive. Low-priced wood garage doors may warp and break easily.

Steel doors come in a variety of sizes and styles, offer strength and security, are cost-competitive, and may include insulation. Steel door varieties include sandwich-type doors with foam-core sections in a steel skin, steel-framed sections with inserts, and non-insulated, single-layer versions (sometimes referred to as "pan doors"). Many new garage doors are made from sheet steel, formed or stamped to resemble a raised-panel wooden door. Designs mimicking carriage house doors are available with manufacturers cladding the exterior of a steel door with composite, vinyl boards, or other trim to give it the appearance of wood.

Fiberglass and vinyl garage doors are composite units that combine a steel frame with a fiberglass or vinyl skin. They may have polyurethane insulated sections or other types of foam insulation. These types of doors perform similarly to steel doors and can be lighter, but they are not as durable. Fiberglass or aluminum doors are commonly used near the ocean, where saltwater can ruin regular steel doors.

Aluminum garage doors are typically used in commercial settings when aesthetics or natural light are priorities. Aluminum is generally used only for full-view garage doors (doors composed of glass sections separated by aluminum stiles). Aluminum doors are rust-proof, but the counterbalance mechanism, rollers, hinges, and track are still made of steel and require regular lubrication and maintenance. These "full-view" style doors can be used in residential applications, but are expensive.

=== Insulation ===
In situations involving residential attached garages, the insulating effectiveness of a garage door is essential to avoid overheating or freezing problems, as well as for comfort and energy savings. Insulation is measured with R value, and various levels can be achieved depending on the product.

== History ==
The history of the garage door could date back to 450 BC when chariots were stored in gatehouses.

Early upward acting doors seem to crop up around the mid-1850s from manufacturers like Cornell & Althouse. In 1854 J.B. Cornell patented a method of joining wooden or metal slats for revolving shutters that could be used for store windows and other security applications. J.B. Cornell later partnered with his sons in 1911 to form a new company called Cornell Iron Works, primarily focused on the production of rolling door products.

In 1921, Cornell introduced the metal security grille to the American market, targeting shops and malls. This would replace the wooden security grille, which was the standard at the time.

In 1919, Owen L. Dautrick applied for a patent for an upward acting "rollable or flexible" door that would not interfere with a vehicle. The patent was granted on February 28, 1922. In 1921 Dautrick and C.G. Johnson apply for another patent for further developments in garage doors. The pair established the Dautrick-Johnson Mfg. Co. in Detroit. The company consisted of them and one carpenter, Arthur Kraska, and they initially produced one door per day.

The three continued to file new patents, and the business continued to grow. The doors they produced became popular in the Detroit area, garnering media attention. In a January 1923 article of the Detroit Free Press, they are for the first time identified as The Overhead Door Company.

Johnson displayed the product at the 1923 New York automobile show, traveling thousands of miles around the country with an operational sectional overhead door installed on the back of a Model T to display the door's ease of operation.

Johnson continued to expand the business and be awarded further patents relating to new inventions and improvements to the overhead door until his sudden death in 1935.

The company continued on, and invents further innovations, like the "Miracle Wedge" with inclined track and graduated hinge system to allow the door to "wedge tightly, but open easily".

Both Cornell Iron Works and The Overhead Door Company continue to operate.

== Types ==
=== Single-panel ===
Single-panel door with jamb-type hardware

Single-panel door on tracks

Single-panel doors are constructed from one monolithic panel. A single-panel door swings up and overhead with a hinge on each side from the closed position to the fully open position. A disadvantage of single-panel doors with jamb-type hardware is that the swing-up arc of the door occurs partially outside the garage, requiring a vehicle to stop and park an increased distance away from the door to avoid being hit when it is opened.

Single-panel doors may also be installed with a single horizontal track on each side of the garage, and a roller mounted at the top of the door on each side. Using tracks, a car can be parked much closer to the door, as the door is positioned entirely inside the garage when opening. A single-panel door running along tracks has less of an arc when raising and lowering the garage door than with jamb-type hardware.

Sectional

Sectional doors usually have three to eight panels and slide up and overhead in an approximate L shape. Sectional doors occupy the same internal garage space as single-panel doors, with two advantages:

- Sectional doors do not require any space outside the garage to open. A vehicle may park very close to the garage before opening the door.
- Each panel of a sectional door has a connection to the door tracks. This increases durability and robustness compared to monolithic doors, which have only a few track connections for the whole panel.

Side-sliding sectional doors also exist, trading ceiling space for wall space.

=== Rolling ===
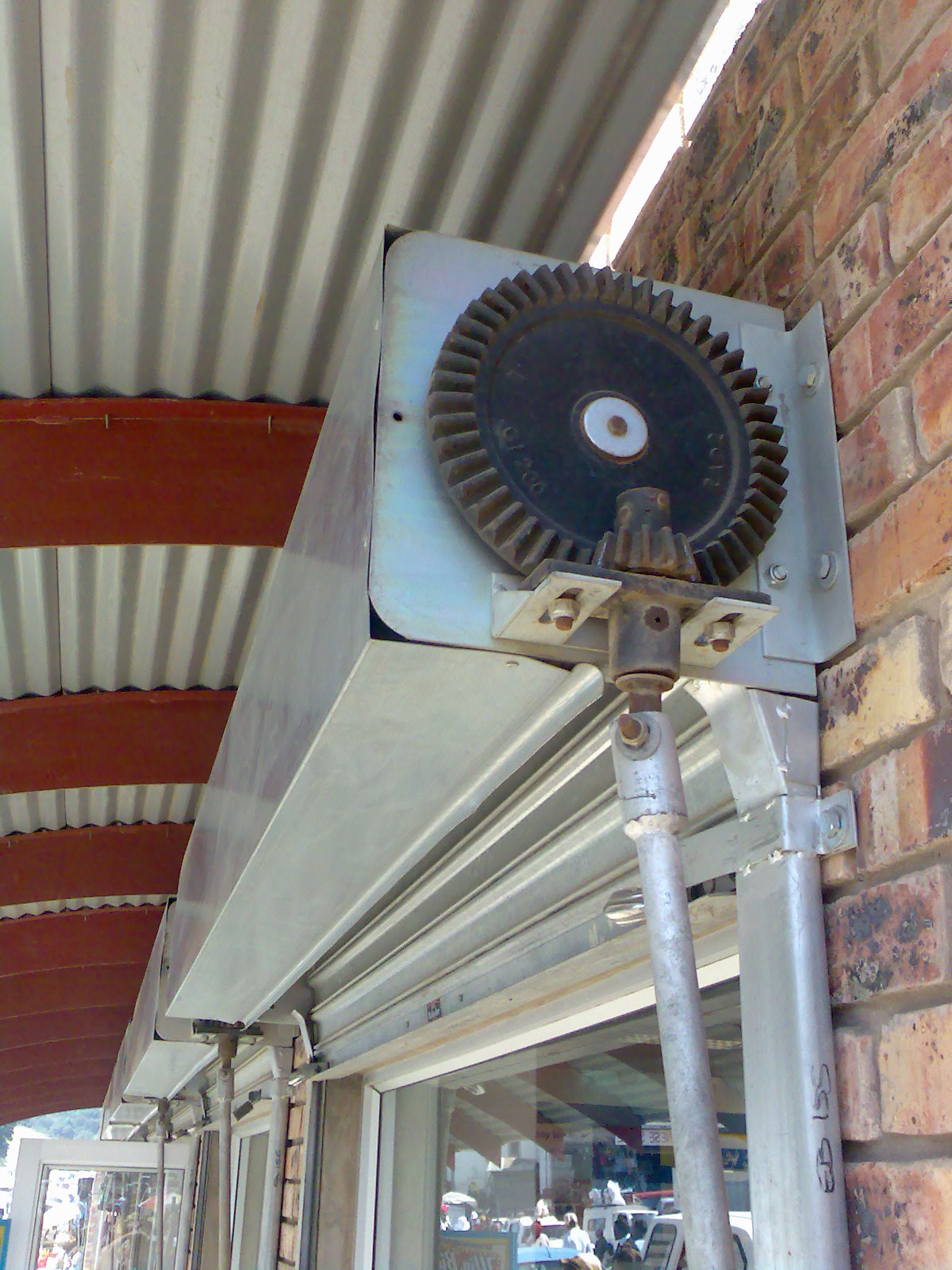
Rolling door mechanism

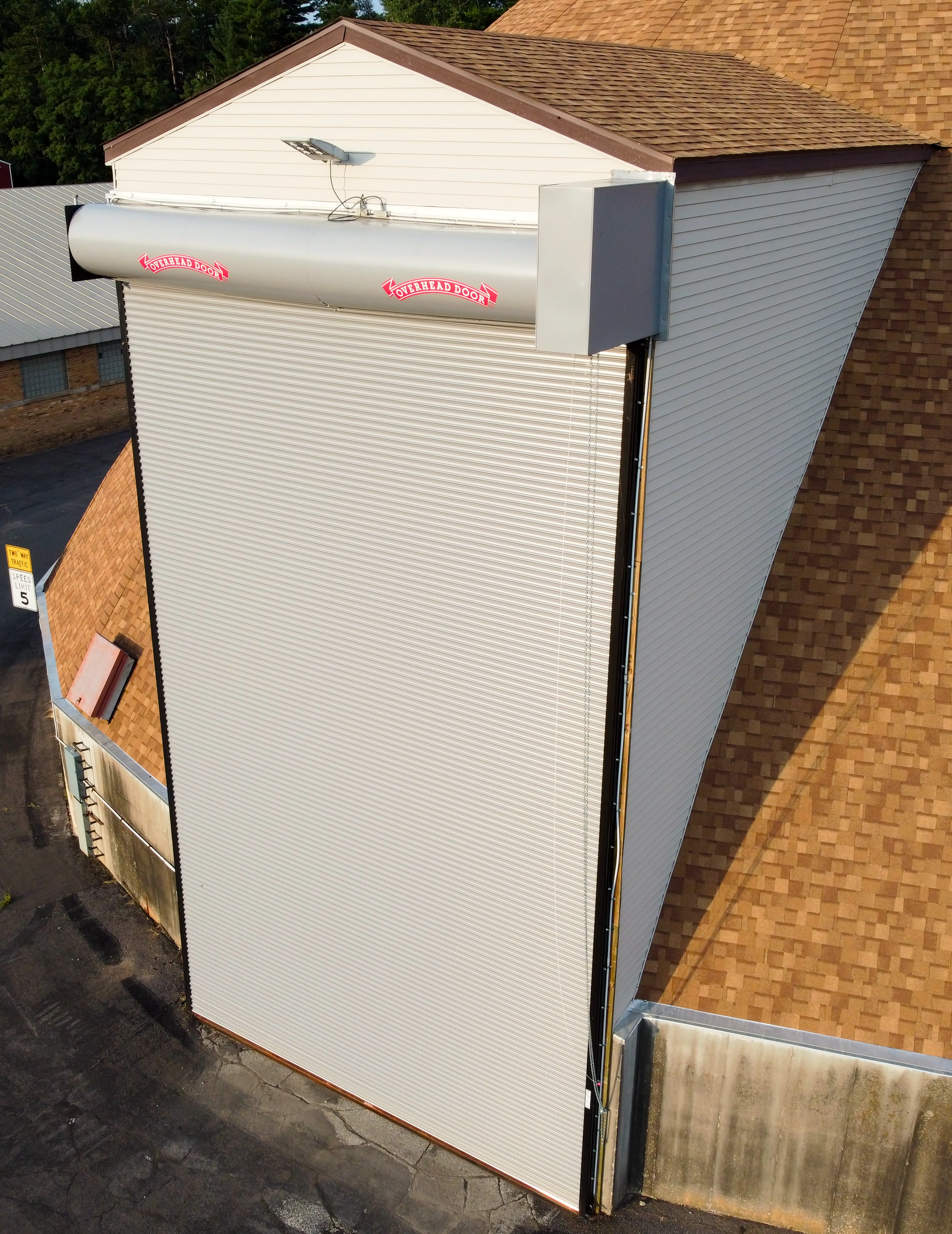
Overhead Door Company rolling steel door

Rolling, service doors, coiling doors, or grilles evolved from window and door coverings.

Rolling doors can come in several styles and materials. Materials can include steel, aluminum, or even wood. Metal variations can be insulated or non insulated.

A typical rolling door has a "barrel" that the "curtain" (the upward acting portion of the door) is attached to. This barrel has an internal spring or springs that are wound to a specific tension to provide counterbalance for the ease of the user, or to make operation easier on a motorized opener.

This type of door can be operated multiple ways depending on the size and configuration, including: by hand, chain hoist, hand crank, or motor.

Rolling doors can be manufactured in fenestrated or perforated versions to provide ventilation if needed.

Rolling fire doors

Rolling fire doors can function as an automatic acting closure necessary for certain openings in buildings pursuant to NFPA 80. These doors drop via a fusible link with melting solder, or an electrical activation from the fire panel. Fire doors must be tested by IDEA certified fire door technicians familiar with rolling door drop mechanisms yearly for compliance.

Rolling grilles

Rolling grilles use almost entirely the same components as a rolling door, but the curtain is made up of a linkage of rods and links as opposed to slats. This allows for security, but maintains high visibility and ventilation. They are often used in storefronts, malls, or parking garages for these reasons.

Sheet doors

Sheet doors are a variation of rolling doors where the upward acting portion of the door is made from a single sheet, or several joined sheets, of corrugated sheet steel or fiberglass.

Sheet doors cannot be effectively insulated; they have a typical insulation R-value of 4.9 to 5.2. By comparison, a sheet steel garage door has a typical insulation R-value of 0.5 to 2.7. An application that needs more thermal insulation typically uses a foam-filled sectional garage door, which provides typical insulation R-values of 6.1 to 6.4.

Sheet doors only provide some rigidity and resistance to damage, and are a cheap way of securing an opening. They are often used in storage unit facilities.

Coiling shutters

Shutters are generally smaller versions of the above varieties. Often used to cover windows for security or fire concerns.

=== High-speed & high-performance doors ===
High performance doors are sectional or rolling style doors that are built for high speed opening and long duty-cycles. These doors are generally designed for a minimum of 100,000 cycles (one cycle is one open and one close of the door). For this reason these doors generally operate with a larger number of springs than other doors, or a counterweight system. Some of the first doors of this kind were rubber or fabric rolling doors that are used in factory or warehouse facilities for keeping openings to clean rooms or cold storage open for as little time as possible.

== Spring mechanisms ==
=== Torsion springs ===
A torsion spring counterbalance system consists of one or two tightly wound springs on a steel shaft, with cable drums at both ends. The apparatus mounts on the header wall above the garage door and has three supports: a center bearing plate with a steel or nylon bearing, and two end bearing plates at both ends. The springs consist of a steel wire with a stationary cone at one end and a winding cone at the other. The stationary cone is attached to the center bearing plate. The winding cone consists of holes every 90 degrees for winding the springs, and two set screws to secure the springs to the shaft. Steel counterbalance cables run from the roller brackets at the bottom corners of the door to notches in the cable drums. When the door is raised, the springs unwind and the stored tension lifts the door by turning the shaft, thus turning the cable drums and wrapping the cables around the grooves on the cable drums. When the door is lowered, the cables are unspooled and the springs are rewound.

Garage door manufacturers typically produce doors fitted with torsion springs that provide a minimum of 10,000 to 15,000 cycles (one cycle being a single opening and closing sequence) and are guaranteed to last for three to seven years. Most manufacturers offer 30,000-cycle springs. However, it is essential to remember that if the garage door's weight is increased by adding glass, additional insulation, or even several coats of paint, the torsion spring's life may be significantly reduced. Additionally, springs in highly humid environments such as coastal regions tend to have a significantly shorter lifespan due to corrosion.

Other factors like poor garage door maintenance or loose components shorten torsion spring life. Owners are advised to avoid applying grease to garage door tracks, as it makes the wheels slide in their tracks without turning. Only bearings, hinges, and spring wires require lubricant.

=== Extension springs ===
An extension spring counterbalance system consists of a pair of stretched springs running parallel to the horizontal tracks. The springs lift the door through a system of pulleys and counterbalance cables running from the bottom corner brackets through the pulleys. When the door is raised, the springs contract, thus lifting the door as the tension is released. Typically, these springs are made of 11 gauge (3 mm) galvanized steel, and the lengths of these springs are based on the height of the garage door. Their lifting weight capacity can be identified by the color painted on the ends of the springs.

== Safety ==
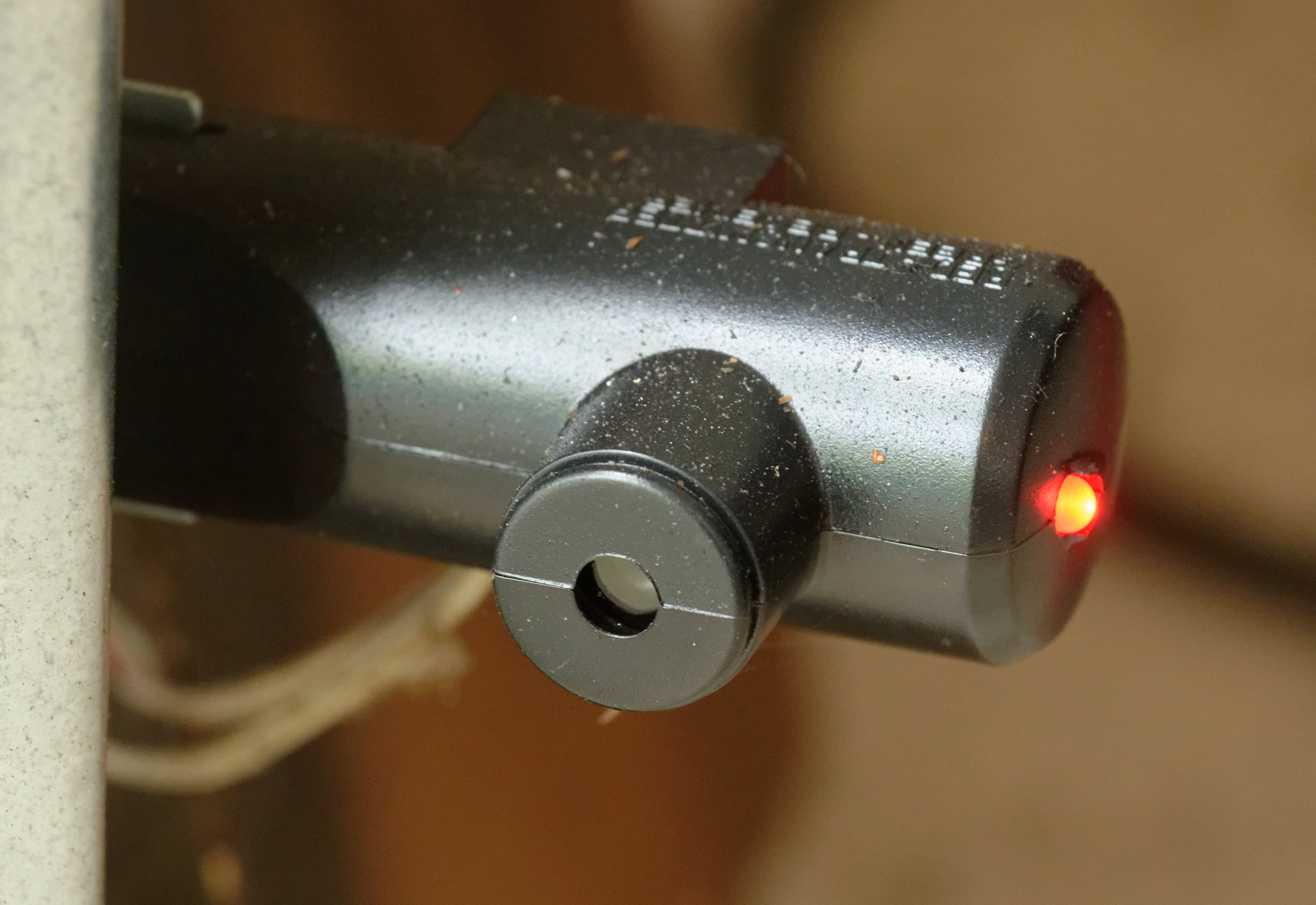
Garage door electric eye

Garage doors can cause injury and property damage (including damage to the door itself) in several ways. The most common causes of injury from garage door systems include falling doors, pinch points, improperly adjusted opener force and electric eye safety settings, attempts at do-it-yourself repair without proper knowledge or tools, and uncontrolled release of spring tension on torsion spring systems.

A garage door with a broken spring or the wrong strength can fall with great force. Because the effective mass of the door increases as the garage door sections transfer from the horizontal to vertical door tracks, a falling garage door accelerates rapidly. A free-falling garage door can cause severe injury or death.

The sections and rollers on garage doors represent a significant pinch hazard. Children should never be allowed near a moving garage door for this reason. On manually operated garage doors, handles should be installed vertically to promote "vertical orientation of the hand".

Mechanical garage door openers can pull or push a garage door with enough force to injure or kill people and pets if they become trapped. Modern openers have “force settings” that make the door reverse if it encounters too much resistance while closing or opening. Any garage door opener sold in the United States after 1992 requires secondary entrapment protection, most commonly electric eyes—sensors that prevent the door from closing if obstructed. Force settings should cause a door to stop or reverse on encountering more than approximately 20 lb (10 kg) of resistance, and electric eyes should be installed a maximum of 6 inches (15 cm) above the ground. Many garage door injuries, and nearly all garage door-related property damage, can be avoided by following these precautions.

Certain parts, especially springs, cables, bottom brackets, and spring anchor plates, are kept under extreme tension. Injuries can occur if parts under tension are removed. Severe injury or death can be caused by the projectile pieces of a failed torsion spring; many people have been injured or killed trying to adjust torsion springs. The Door & Access Systems Manufacturers Association states that spring systems are dangerous and should be repaired only by trained professionals.

Extension spring systems should always be restrained by a safety cable that runs through the middle of the spring, being tied to solid points at the rear and front of the horizontal door track. The safety cable minimizes hazards to bystanders if a spring, pulley, or cable breaks under tension.

Maintenance of garage doors is described in the manufacturer's instructions and consists of periodic checks for correct operation, visual inspection of parts, and lubrication.
