= PKS 1538+149 =

BL Lacertae object located in the constellation Serpens

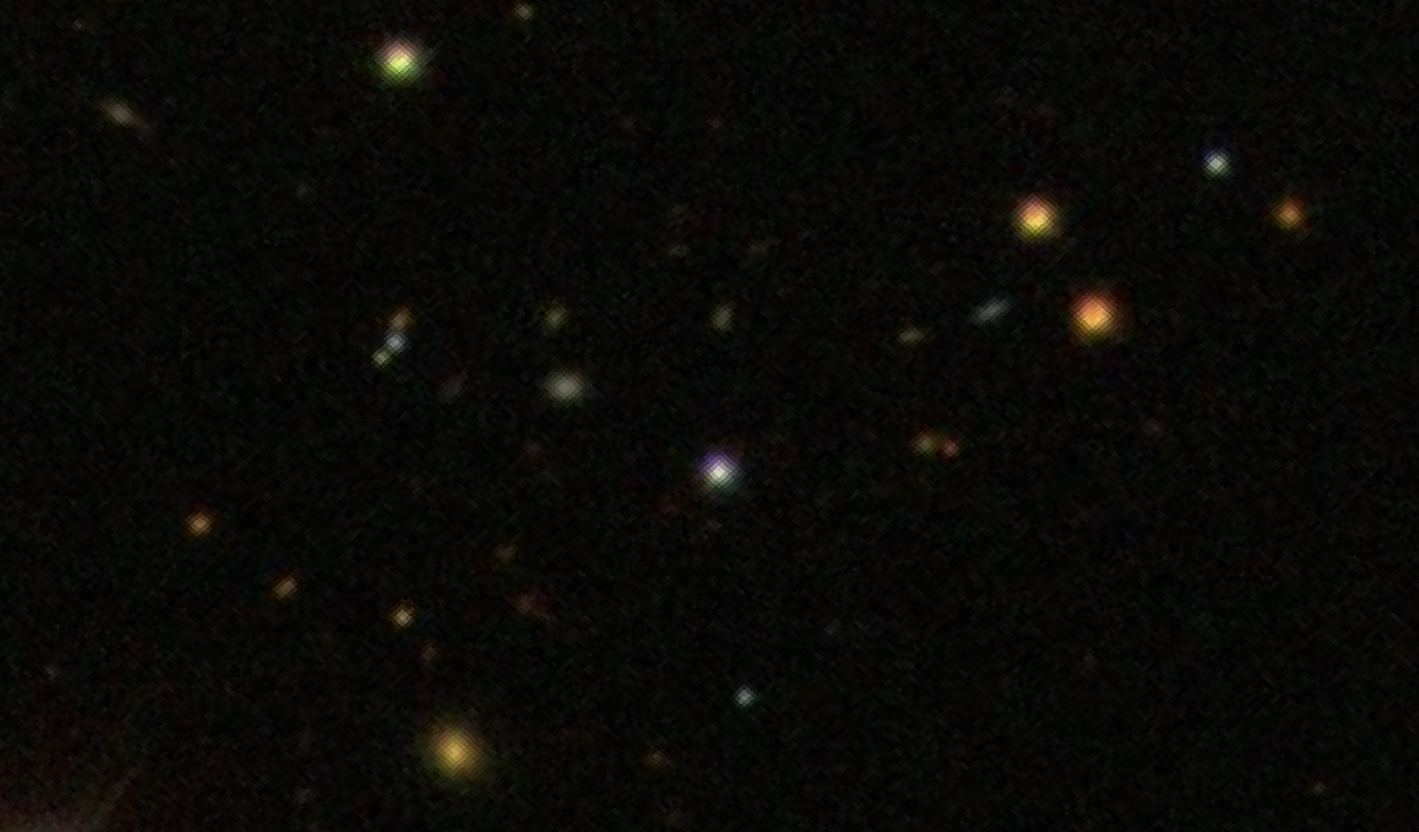
- Sloan Digital Sky Survey image of PKS 1538+149.

Observation data (J2000.0 epoch)
- Constellation: Serpens
- Right ascension: 15^{h} 40^{m} 49.49^{s}
- Declination: +14° 47′ 45.88″
- Redshift: 0.606441
- Heliocentric radial velocity: 181,806 km/s
- Distance: 5.733 Gly
- Apparent magnitude (V): 17.30
- Apparent magnitude (B): 17.72

Characteristics
- Type: Opt. var; FRSQ BLLAC

Other designations
- 4C +14.60, MG J1540+1447, LEDA 2819234, OR +165, CoNFIG 226, Cul 1538+149, RX J1540.8+1447, 2MASSI J1540494+144745, SDSS J154049.49+144745.8

PKS 1538+149 also known as 4C 14.60, is a BL Lacertae object located in the constellation of Serpens. The redshift of the object is found to be (z) 0.605 and was discovered through photoelectric observations in February 1975 by astronomers who observed it had a continuous spectra. The radio spectrum of the source is flat, describing it a flat-spectrum radio quasar (FRSQ).

== Description ==
PKS 1538+149 is shown undergoing a decrease in brightness levels by displaying a low visual magnitude of 1.7 as observed by E.R. Craine and K. Johnson. It is noted to be variable too, when it was detected by J.T. Pollock in 1975, who noted the object had an amplitude exceeding more than a magnitude of 2.8 ± 0.20, however it has no evidence of variations in X-ray flux. During the period between April and June 1986, the light curve data, showed it undergoing a decrease of 0.0026 magnitude per day, averaging on the magnitude of 18.54. The object is also classified as a blazar due to its high optical polarization, displaying large variations more than 1 magnitude while the spectral index described as both steep and also variable, remained constant.

The radio structure of PKS 1538+149 is described as compact. On arcsecond scales, the source has a size of 6 centimeters with radio emission depicted as being concentrated in its northern region. Observations also showed the source is elongated with radio frequency identification imaging finding the emission further extends northwest by 60 milliarcseconds and by 10 milliarcseconds at 8.4 GHz frequencies. It is found PKS 1538+149 has a jet with jet power of 2.36 × 10^{45} ergs with an opening angle of 16.1°. The radio core is noted shifting by 0.032 milliarcseconds in frequencies of 8.1-15.3 GHz.

Earlier observations, especially using near-infrared H-band found PKS 1538+149 has an unresolved host galaxy. Imaging with Hubble Space Telescope would later reveal the host galaxy is indeed a round elliptical galaxy, surrounded by several other faint galaxies within its vicinity. It has a low surface brightness and V-I color of 2.85. A de Vaucouleurs model also described the host galaxy as large and luminous with a measured magnitude of -25.1 and length of 21 kilometers in size. A central supermassive black hole mass of 7.54 × 10^{4} M_{☉} was found for the object.
