= Garage door opener =

Motorized device that opens and closes garage doors

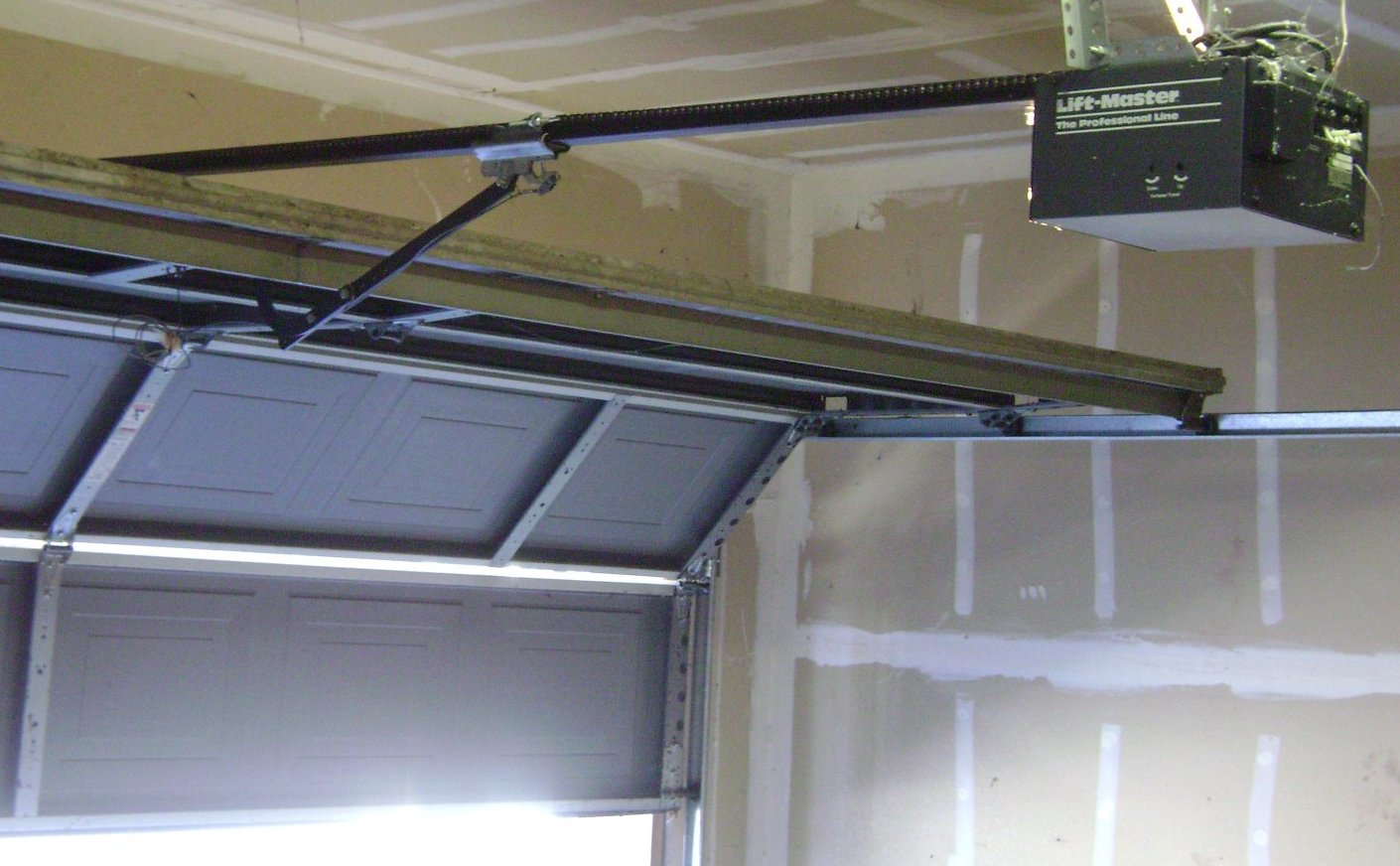
A residential garage door opener. The motor is in the box on the upper-right.

A garage door opener is a motorized device that opens and closes a garage door controlled by switches on the garage wall. Most also include a handheld radio remote control carried by the owner, which can be used to open and close the door from a short distance.

== The electric opener ==
The electric overhead garage door opener was invented by C.G. Johnson in 1926 in Hartford City, Indiana. Electric Garage Door openers did not become popular until Era Meter Company of Chicago offered one after World War II where the overhead garage door could be opened via a key pad located on a post at the end of the driveway or a switch inside the garage.

As in an elevator, the electric motor does not provide most of the power to move a heavy garage door. Instead, most of door's weight is offset by the counterbalance springs attached to the door. (Even manually operated garage doors have counterbalances; otherwise, they would be too heavy for a person to open or close them.) In a typical design, torsion springs apply torque to a shaft, and that shaft applies a force to the garage door via steel counterbalance cables. The electric opener provides only a small amount of force to control how far the door opens and closes. In most cases, the garage door opener also holds the door closed in place of a lock.

The typical electric garage door opener consists of a power unit that contains the electric motor. The power unit attaches to a track. A trolley connected to an arm that attaches to the top of the garage door slides back and forth on the track, thus opening and closing the garage door. The trolley is pulled along the track by a chain, belt, or screw that turns when the motor is operated. A quick-release mechanism is attached to the trolley to allow the garage door to be disconnected from the opener for manual operation during a power failure or in case of emergency. Limit switches on the power unit control the distance the garage door opens and closes once the motor receives a signal from the remote control or wall push button to operate the door.

The entire assembly hangs above the garage door. The power unit hangs from the ceiling and is located towards the rear of the garage. The end of the track on the opposite end of the power unit attaches to a header bracket that is attached to the header wall above the garage door. The powerhead is usually supported by punched angle iron.

Recently another type of opener, known as the jackshaft opener, has become more popular. This style of opener was used frequently on commercial doors but in recent years has been adapted for residential use. This style of opener consists of a motor that attaches to the side of the torsion rod and moves the door up and down by simply spinning the rod. These openers need a few extra components to function safely for residential use. These include a cable tension monitor, to detect when a cable is broken, and a separate locking mechanism to lock the door when it is fully closed. These have the advantage that they free up ceiling space that an ordinary opener and rail would occupy. These also have the disadvantage that the door must have a torsion rod to attach the motor to.

== Types ==
There are six types of garage door openers:

1. Chain drive openers. These have a chain (similar to a bicycle's) that connects the trolley to the motor.
2. Belt drive openers use a rubber belt in place of a chain.
3. Screw drive openers have a long screw inside the track. The trolley connects to this screw.
4. Direct drive openers have the motor installed inside the trolley and use a gear wheel to guide the trolley along a fixed chain.
5. Jackshaft openers mount on the wall at either end of the torsion bar.
6. Roller openers automate roller doors, which roll upward and coil around a drum above the garage entrance, maximizing space. These openers typically feature two tines that slide into a drum wheel within the roller door mechanism, engaging to smoothly lift or lower the door.

== Remote control ==
The first wireless garage door openers were invented and developed by two US inventors at the same time, one in Illinois and the other in Washington state, around 1930. They were unknown to each other.

The first garage door opener remote controls were simple and consisted of a simple transmitter (the remote) and receiver which controlled the opener mechanism. The transmitter would transmit on a designated frequency; the receiver would listen for the radio signal, then open or close the garage, depending on the door position. The basic concept of this can be traced back to World War II. This type of system was used to detonate remote bombs. While novel at the time, the technology ran its course when garage door openers became popular. While the garage door remote control transmitter is low power and has limited range, its signal can be received by other, nearby, garage door openers. When two neighbors had garage door openers, then opening one garage door might open the neighbor's garage door as well.

The second stage of the Wireless garage door opener system solved the opening-the-neighbor's-garage-door problem. The remote controls on these systems transmitted a digital code, and the receiver in the garage responded only to that code. The codes were typically set by eight to twelve DIP switches on the receiver and transmitter, so they allowed for 2^{8} = 256 to 2^{12} = 4,096 different codes. As long as neighbors used different codes, they would not open each other's garage doors. The intent of these systems was to avoid interference with nearby garage doors; the systems were not designed with security in mind. Intruders were able to defeat the security of these systems and gain entry to the garage and the house. The number of codes was small enough that even an unsophisticated intruder with a compatible remote control transmitter could just start transmitting all possible codes until he found one that opened the door. More sophisticated intruders could acquire a black box master key that automatically transmitted every possible code in a short time. An even more sophisticated method is known as a replay attack. The attacker would use a code grabber, which has a receiver that captures the remote's digital code and can retransmit that digital code at a later time. The attacker with a code grabber would wait nearby for the homeowner to use his remote, capture the code, and then replay the code to open the door when the homeowner was gone. Multicode openers became unpopular in areas where security was important, but due to their ease of programming, such openers are often used to operate such things as the gates in gated apartment complexes.

An intermediate stage of the garage door opener market eliminated the DIP switches and used remotes preprogrammed to one out of roughly 3.5 billion unique codes. The receiver would maintain a security list of remotes to which it would respond; the user could easily add the unique remote's code to the list by pressing a button on the garage door opener while activating the remote control. A large number of codes made the brute force try-all-possible-digital-codes attacks infeasible, but the systems were still vulnerable to code grabbers. For user convenience, these systems were also backward compatible with the older DIP switch remote codes, but adding an old technology remote to the security list made the garage door opener vulnerable to a brute force attack to find the DIP switch code. The larger code space approach was an improvement over the fixed DIP switch codes but was still vulnerable to the replay attack.

The third stage of garage door opener technology uses a frequency spectrum range between 300–400 MHz and rolling code (code hopping) technology to defeat code grabbers. In addition to transmitting a unique identifier for the remote control, a sequence number and an encrypted message are also sent. Although an intruder could still capture the code used to open a garage door, the sequence number immediately expires, so retransmitting the code later would not open the garage door. The encryption makes it extremely difficult for an intruder to forge a message with the next sequence number that would open the door. Some rolling code systems are more involved than others. Because there is a high probability that someone will push the remote's button while not in range and thus advance the sequence number, the receiver does not insist the sequence number increase by exactly one; it will accept a sequence number that falls within a narrow window or two successive sequence numbers in a much wider window. Rolling code technology is also used on car remote controls and with some internet protocols for secure sites.

The fourth stage of garage door opener systems is similar to third stage, but it is limited to the 315 MHz frequency. The 315 MHz frequency range avoids interference from the land mobile radio system (LMRS) used by the U.S. military.

The following standards are used by units manufactured by Chamberlain (including LiftMaster and Craftsman):

Dates	System	Color of programming button and LED on unit	Color of LED on remote*
1984–1993	8-12 DIP switch on 300–400 MHz	white, gray, or yellow button with red LED	red
1993–1997	Billion Code on 390 MHz	green button with green or red LED	green
1997–2005	Security+ (rolling code) on 390 MHz	orange or red button with amber LED	amber or none
2005–2014	Security+ (rolling code) on 315 MHz	purple button with amber LED	none
2011–2025	Security+ 2.0 (rolling code) on 310, 315, and 390 MHz	yellow button with amber LED and yellow antenna wires	red or blue
2025–present	Security+ 3.0 (BLE LR) on 2.4 GHz	white button with amber LED	red, amber, or blue

* Does not apply to keyless entry keypads or universal remotes.

Recent Chamberlain garage door openers that have Security+ 2.0 features also use a special serial protocol on wired connections rather than a simple switch closure.

The following standards are used by units manufactured by Overhead Door Corporation and its subsidiary The Genie Company†:

Dates	System
1985–1995	9–12 DIP switch on 360, 380, or 390 MHz
1995–2005	Intellicode/CodeDodger (rolling code) on 390 MHz
2005–present	Intellicode/CodeDodger (rolling code) on 315 MHz
2011–present	Intellicode 2/CodeDodger 2 (rolling code) on 315 and 390 MHz

† Note: There are no standard color codes for the learn button or LED on units manufactured by Overhead Door or Genie. All accessories made for later versions of Genie Intellicode and Overhead Door CodeDodger are backward compatible with previous generations of Intellicode and CodeDodger.

== Cloning garage door opener remotes ==
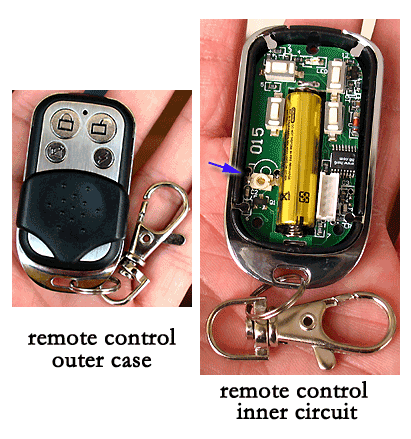
A typical photo of both the outer case and inner circuit of a garage door opener remote control.

Many garage door opener remote controls use fixed-code encoding which use DIP switches or soldering to do the address pins coding process, and they usually use pt2262/pt2272 or compatible ICs. For these fixed-code garage door opener remotes, one can easily clone the existing remote using a self-learning remote control duplicator (copy remote) which can make a copy of the remote using face-to-face copying.

== Additional features ==
Additional features that have been added over the years have included:

- Automatic courtesy lights that turn on when the door opens (or via motion sensors) and automatically turn off after a preset delay
- A remote lockout feature, which turns off the radio receiver while one is on vacation or away for an extended time.
- The availability of accessories has increased, including such features as wireless keypads, key chain remotes, and solenoid-operated deadbolts to lock the door itself.
- Automatic door closing feature, which after a fixed time by the owner, closes the garage door to prevent theft.

More sophisticated features are also available, such as an integrated carbon monoxide sensor to open the door in case of the garage being flooded with exhaust fumes. Other systems allow door activation over the Internet to allow home owners to open their garage door from their office for deliveries.

Another recent innovation in the garage door opener is a fingerprint-based wireless keypad. This unit attaches to the outside of the garage door on the jamb and allows users to open and close their doors with the press of a finger, rather than creating a personal identification number (PIN). This is especially helpful for families with children who may forget a code and are latchkey kids.

== Safety ==
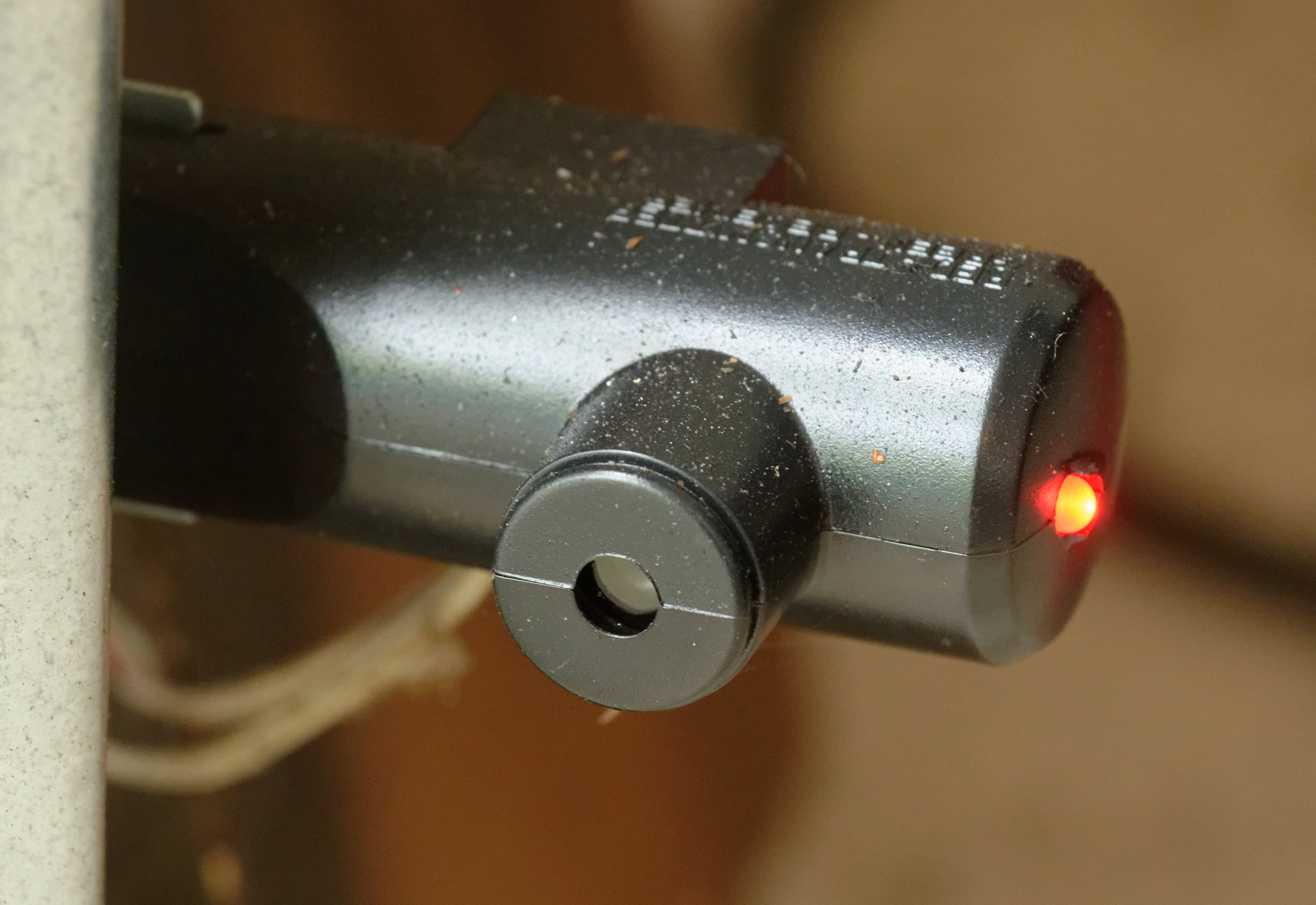
Electric eye for safety

The garage door is generally the largest moving object in a home. An improperly adjusted garage door opener can exert strong and deadly forces and might not reverse the garage door in an emergency. The manufacturer's instructions provide guidance to the user on the proper adjustment and maintenance of the opener.

Garage door openers manufactured and installed in the United States since 1982 are required to provide a quick-release mechanism on the trolley that allows for the garage door to be disconnected from the garage door opener in the event of entrapment. Garage door openers manufactured since 1991 are also required to reverse the garage door if it strikes a solid object.

In the United States, the Consumer Product Safety Improvement Act of 1990 required that automatic residential garage door operators manufactured on or after 1 January 1991 conform to the entrapment protection requirements of the 1988 version of ANSI/UL standard 325. A requirement for redundant entrapment-prevention devices was added in 1993; such a system can use an electric eye, a door edge sensor, or any other device that provides equivalent protection by reversing the travel of the closing door if an object is detected in its path.

=== California Senate Bill No. 969 ===
In California, Senate Bill No. 969 requires that any automatic residential garage door opener that is manufactured for sale, sold, offered for sale, or installed in a residence to have a battery backup function that is designed to operate when activated because of an electrical outage. The bill went into effect on July 1, 2019. Under the bill, any automatic garage door opener that is in violation is subject to a civil penalty of $1000.

The bill was passed by Gov. Jerry Brown on Sept. 21, 2018, in response to the 2017 California Wildfires in which at least 5 individuals lost their lives because they could not open their garage door when the power went out.

The Door and Access Systems Manufacturers Association International opposed the bill arguing that garage door openers with backup batteries require regular maintenance and that the bill should be amended to make this clear. In addition, they said that "garage door openers with backup batteries are not designed to serve as life safety devices, and should not be relied upon to prove a means of egress from a garage during an electrical outage."

The bill passed, despite most garage doors having a release pull cord.
