= Electric eye =

Device for detecting obstruction of a light beam

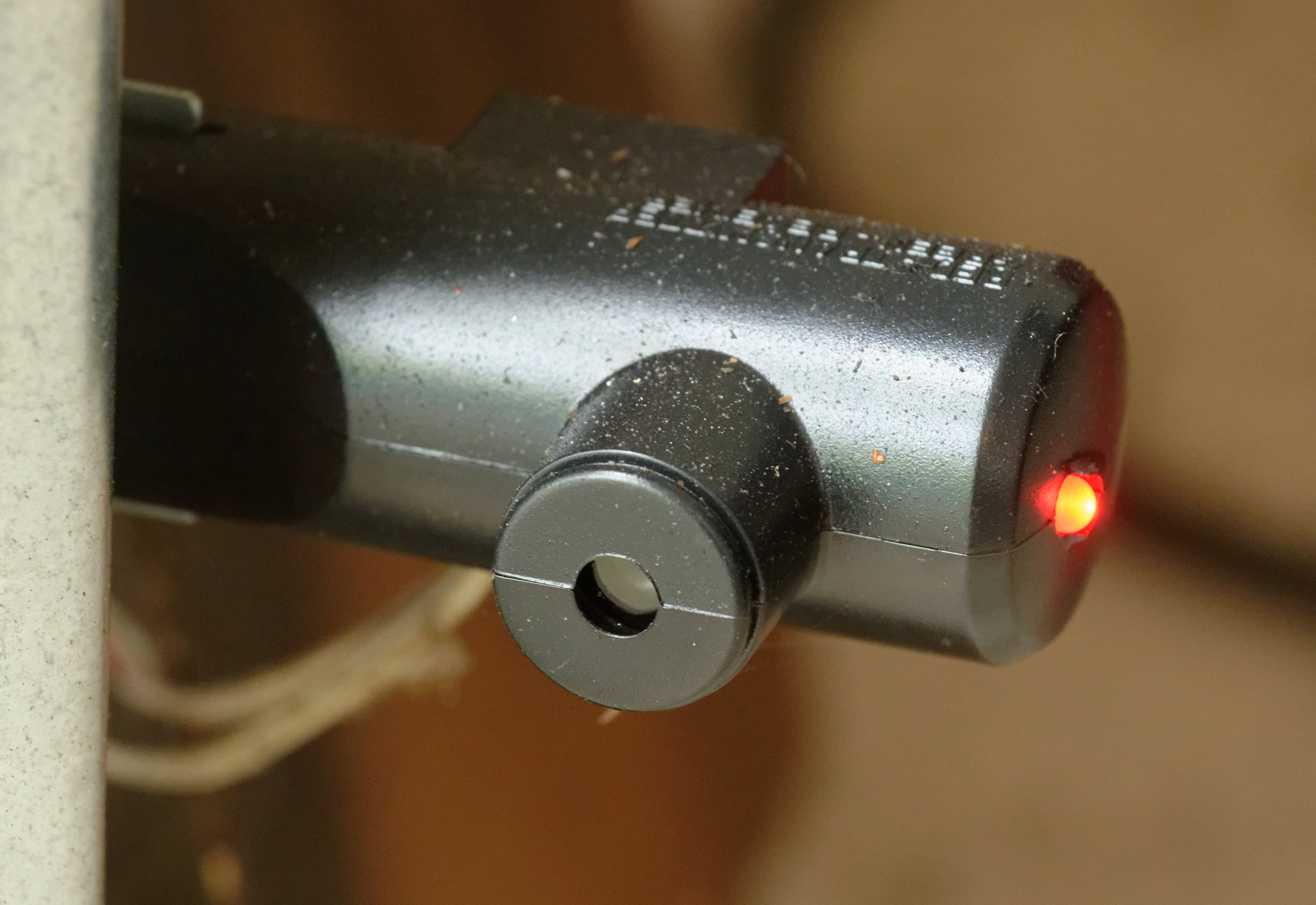
Electric eye for a garage door opener

An electric eye is a photodetector used for detecting obstruction of a light beam. An example is the door safety system used on garage door openers that use a light transmitter and receiver at the bottom of the door to prevent closing if there is any obstruction in the way that breaks the light beam. The device does not provide an image; only the presence of light is detectable. Visible light may be used, but infrared radiation conceals the operation of the device and typically is used in modern systems. Originally, systems used lamps powered by direct current or the power line alternating current frequency, but modern photodetector systems use an infrared light-emitting diode modulated at a few kilohertz, which allows the detector to reject stray light and improves the range, sensitivity, and security of the device.

== Examples ==
Highway vehicle counter

- In the 1930s, an electric eye vehicle counter was introduced in the US using two IR lamps set apart so that only cars and pedestrians would be counted.

First compact commercial unit

- A compact type of electric eye was offered in 1931 that was enclosed in a small steel case and much easier to install compared to older models.

Automatic wrapping machines

- In the 1930s, an electric eye apparatus was developed to help a wrapping machine wrap 72 boxes a minute.

Automatic door opener

- In 1931, General Electric tested the first automatic door openers now popular in hospitals. They called their electric eye the Magic Eye.

Business alarm system

- In 1931, an electric eye that used invisible UV wavelength was offered to businesses in need of a 24-hour alarm system. A system of this type is demonstrated in the first scene of the 1932 film Jewel Robbery.

Automatic cameras

- In 1936, Dr. Albert Einstein and Dr. Gustav Bucky received a patent for a design which applied the electric eye to a camera. The camera was capable of automatically determining the proper aperture and exposure.

== See also ==
- Photoelectric sensor
- Machine vision
