= Photoelectric sensor =

Device used to determine location of an object

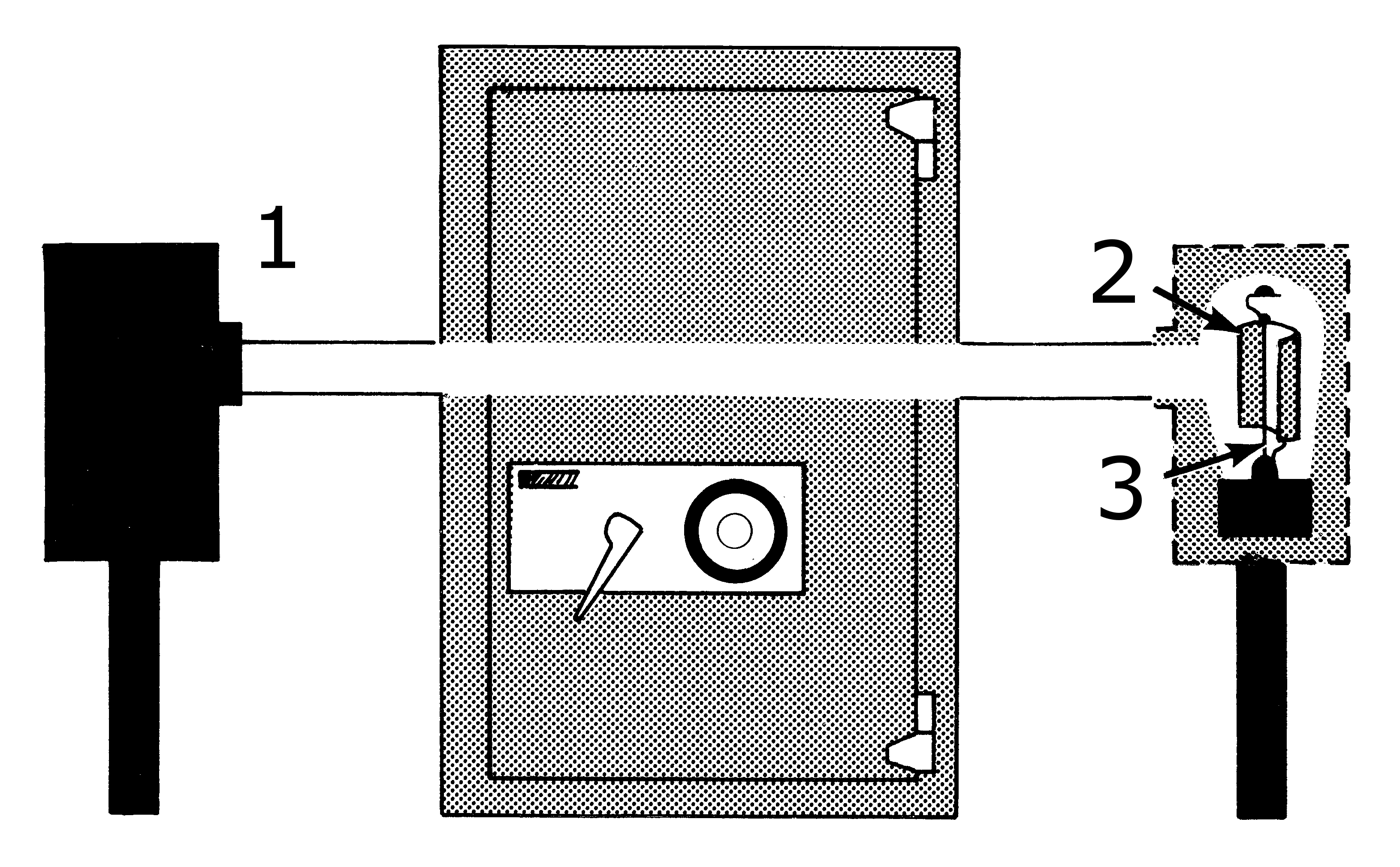
Conceptual through-beam system to detect unauthorized access to a secure door. If the beam is interrupted, the detector triggers an alarm.

A photoelectric sensor is a device used to determine the distance, absence, or presence of an object by using a light transmitter, often infrared, and a photoelectric receiver. They are largely used in industrial manufacturing. There are three different useful types: opposed (through-beam), retro-reflective, and proximity-sensing (diffused).

== Types ==
A self-contained photoelectric sensor contains the optics, along with the electronics. It requires only a power source. The sensor performs its own modulation, demodulation, amplification, and output switching. Some self-contained sensors provide such options as built-in control timers or counters. Because of technological progress, self-contained photoelectric sensors have become increasingly smaller.

Remote photoelectric sensors used for remote sensing contain only the optical components of a sensor. The circuitry for power input, amplification, and output switching is located elsewhere, typically in a control panel. This allows the sensor, itself, to be very small. Also, the controls for the sensor are more accessible, since they may be bigger.

When space is restricted or the environment too hostile even for remote sensors, fibre optics may be used. Fibre optics are passive mechanical sensing components. They may be used with either remote or self-contained sensors. They have no electrical circuitry and no moving parts, and can safely pipe light into and out of hostile environments.

== Sensing modes ==
A through-beam arrangement consists of a receiver located within the line-of-sight of the transmitter. In this mode, an object is detected when the light beam is blocked from getting to the receiver from the transmitter.

A retroreflective arrangement places the transmitter and receiver at the same location and uses a reflector to bounce the inverted light beam back from the transmitter to the receiver. An object is sensed when the beam is interrupted and fails to reach the receiver.

A proximity-sensing (diffused) arrangement is one in which the transmitted radiation must reflect off the object in order to reach the receiver. In this mode, an object is detected when the receiver sees the transmitted source rather than when it fails to see it. As in retro-reflective sensors, diffuse sensor emitters and receivers are located in the same housing. But the target acts as the reflector so that detection of light is reflected off the disturbance object. The emitter sends out a beam of light (most often a pulsed infrared, visible red, or laser) that diffuses in all directions, filling a detection area. The target then enters the area and deflects part of the beam back to the receiver. Detection occurs and output is turned on or off when sufficient light falls on the receiver.

Some photo-eyes have two different operational types, light operate and dark operate. The light operates photo eyes become operational when the receiver "receives" the transmitter signal. Dark operate photo eyes become operational when the receiver "does not receive" the transmitter signal.

The detecting range of a photoelectric sensor is its "field of view", or the maximum distance from which the sensor can retrieve information, minus the minimum distance. A minimum detectable object is the smallest object the sensor can detect. More accurate sensors can often have minimum detectable objects of minuscule size.

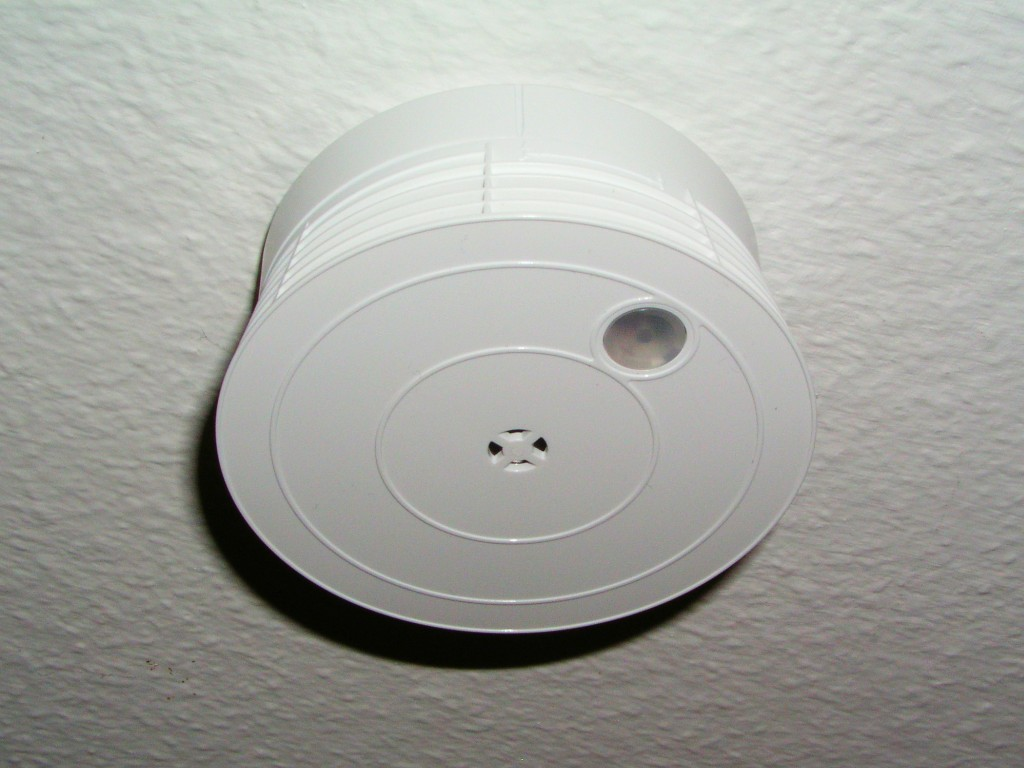
Certain types of smoke detector use a photoelectric sensor to warn of smouldering fires.

=== Difference between modes ===
Name	Advantages	Disadvantages
Through-beam	Most accurate; Longest sensing range; Very reliable	Must install at two points on system: emitter and receiver; May not detect translucent objects; False triggers when misaligned.
Reflective	Only slightly less accurate than through-beam; Sensing range better than diffuse; Very reliable	Must install at two points on the system: sensor and reflector; Slightly more costly than diffuse; Sensing range less than through-beam; May not detect objects with high albedo
LASER-Reflective	Single point installation; Good for detecting small objects; Clearly defined sensing ranges; Very reliable	Blind to objects outside specified range; Not good for mirror finishes
Diffuse	Only install at one point; Cost less than through-beam or reflective	Less accurate than through-beam or reflective; More setup time involved

== Advantages and disadvantages ==
Photoelectric sensors have benefits like:

- Compact size
- Versatility of material to be detected
- Wide range of detection, variability of the range
- Fast contactless operation

Limitations however are:

- To enable operation mode certain conditions specified by manufacturer have to be met; excessive lighting like sunlight may interfere with operational mode, requiring proper shielding and filtering.
- Reflectivity of the object being detected can impact sensor performance, especially in retroreflective and diffuse-reflective modes
- The detection range of photoelectric sensors is limited unless emitter+receiver pair is used
- Some photoelectric sensors, especially through-beam types, require precise alignment for reliable operation
- Harsh environment (e.g. high temperatures, acidity, fumes, dirt) can affect performance

== See also ==
- List of sensors
- Photodetector
- Proximity sensor
- Sensor
- Electric eye
- Photodiode
