= WHT =

WHT may stand for:

- Walsh–Hadamard transform
- Westmoreland Heritage Trail, a rail trail in Pennsylvania
- Western Harbour Tunnel, a transport tunnel in Hong Kong
- Whitchurch railway station (Wales), Cardiff, Wales (National Rail station code)
- White coat hypertension, the phenomenon where people exhibit hypertension in a clinical setting, although they do not exhibit it in other settings
- William Herschel Telescope, a 4.20-metre (165 in) telescope located on the island of La Palma
- William Howard Taft (1857–1930), 27th president and 10th chief justice of the United States
- Withholding tax, a tax deducted at the source
- Wometco Home Theater, a short-lived over-the-air subscription television service
- World Harvest Television, a channel from television network Family Broadcasting Corporation
