= Turtle Creek (Monongahela River tributary) =

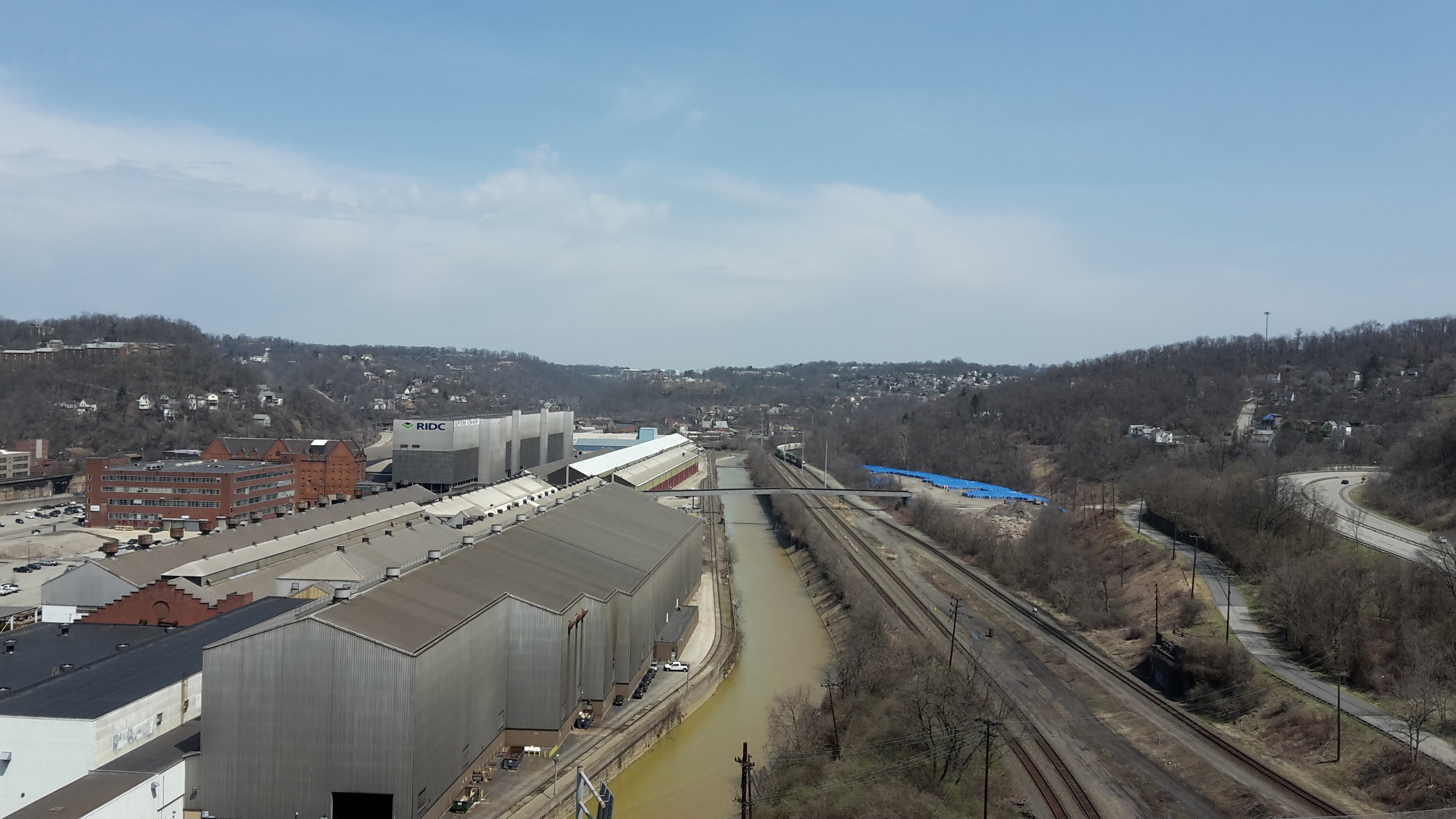
- Turtle Creek, as seen looking north from the George Westinghouse Bridge

Location
- Country: United States
- State: Pennsylvania
- Counties: Westmoreland, Allegheny

Physical characteristics
- Source
  - coordinates: 40.4275675°N 79.5769871°W
- Mouth
  - coordinates: 40.3897913°N 79.8519929°W
  - elevation: 718.7 ft (219.1 m)
- Length: 21.1 mi (34.0 km)
- Basin size: 147.41 mi^{2} (381.8 km^{2})
- Discharge
  - location: Wilmerding, Pennsylvania
  - average: 189 cu ft/s (5.4 m^{3}/s)
  - minimum: 13 cu ft/s (0.37 m^{3}/s)
  - maximum: 10,100 cu ft/s (290 m^{3}/s)

Basin features
- River system: Monongahela River

Turtle Creek is a 21.1-mile-long (34.0 km) tributary of the Monongahela River that is located in Allegheny and Westmoreland counties in the U.S. state of Pennsylvania. Situated at its juncture with the Monongahela is Braddock, Pennsylvania, where the Battle of the Monongahela ("Braddock's Defeat") was fought in 1755.

During the mid-nineteenth century, the Pennsylvania Railroad laid tracks along the stream as part of its Main Line from Philadelphia to Pittsburgh.

== Course ==
The headwaters of Turtle Creek are located in Delmont. The stream flows westward through the municipalities of Export, Murrysville, Monroeville, Penn Township, Trafford, Pitcairn, Wilmerding, Turtle Creek, East Pittsburgh and North Braddock, before and entering the Monongahela River in North Versailles Township.

== History ==
=== The western frontier: 1700s ===
1751 map depicting "Turtle C" near top, just left of center

Turtle Creek is the English translation of the Native American name, naming the area for its abundance of turtles.

During the mid-eighteenth century, the Turtle Creek valley lay on the western frontier of the British colony of Pennsylvania, and much of its early written history revolved around the French and Indian War. In 1755, the first major battle in the theater took place near the mouth of Turtle Creek at the Monongahela river, where the British General Edward Braddock was mortally wounded and his forces compelled to retreat from what became a failed expedition to capture the French Fort Duquesne. In 1758, General John Forbes led a more formidable and ultimately successful expedition against the fort, establishing a more northerly military road which crossed Turtle Creek in what is now Murrysville.

In 1763, the war with the French was concluded and Pontiac's War began, in which Henry Bouquet's forces engaged a group of allied tribal forces at the Battle of Bushy Run. Upon defeating his opponents, Bouquet followed them downstream to the banks of Turtle Creek near what would become the town of Pitcairn, where he found the Native American forces had hastily abandoned their camp site, which Boquet referred to as a "Dirty Camp." Bouquet's description inspired the name of small stream that flows into Turtle Creek there, "Dirty Camp Run."

After these hostilities abated, George Washington, who was part of both Braddock's ill-fated expedition and Forbes' successful campaign, returned to the area and is believed to have followed roads along Brush Creek and Turtle Creek en route to and from Fort Pitt. Washington traveled through the area multiple times, and was known to have stopped at the residences of two early settlers of the Turtle Creek area. One was Martha Miers, a French and Indian war widow, who had an inn near Thompson Run. The other was John Fraser, who had served with Washington under General Braddock and who settled near the mouth of Turtle Creek.

=== Railroads and industrialization: ~1850-1900s ===
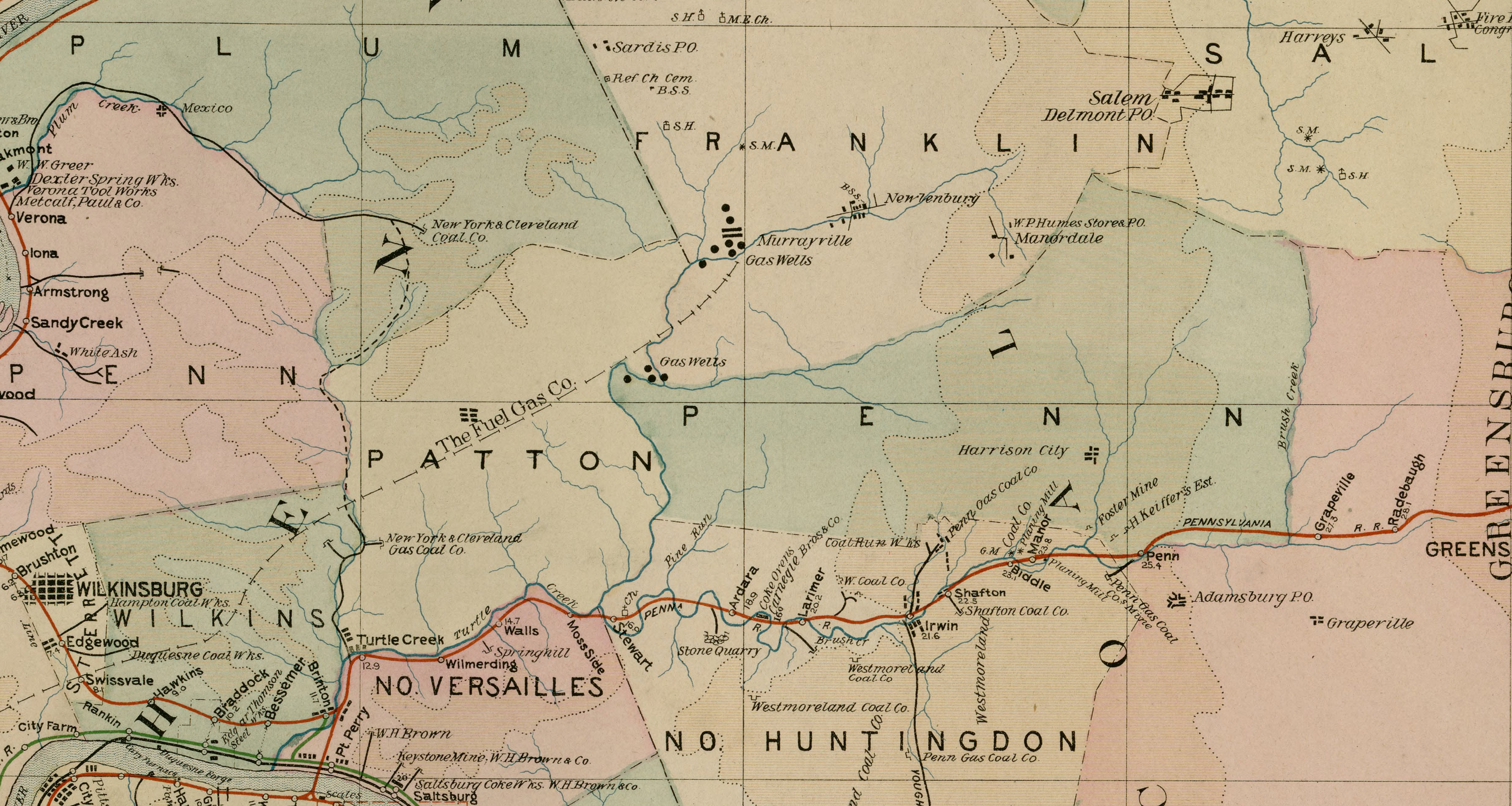
Turtle Creek, 1884; the highlighted Pennsylvania Railroad (red) and the coalfields (brown) are highlighted had lasting impacts on the course of the creek and the quality of water flowing through it

A century after the first military roads were carved through the Turtle Creek valley, another type of road took advantage of the gentle gradient that the creek carved through the surrounding hills. In 1852, the Main Line of the Pennsylvania Railroad opened for business, transporting passengers and freight between Philadelphia and Pittsburgh via track laid along the left bank of the lower section of Turtle Creek and farther upstream through the Brush Creek valley.

In 1891, the Turtle Creek Valley Railroad began service from Trafford, proceeding along the middle and upper sections of Turtle Creek. It was acquired by the PRR in 1903, and the railroad would be further extended beyond the bounds of the Turtle Creek watershed to Saltsburg. Andrew Carnegie's Union Railroad was laid along Turtle Creek and its tributary, Thompson Run connecting to his Edgar Thomson Steel Works in Braddock. George Westinghouse's Interworks Railway began service in 1902, connecting his three major manufacturing facilities in the lower Turtle Creek valley.

As industry grew in the Turtle Creek valley, several towns began to grow around the factories, railroads and resources along the creek. By 1876, the largest towns along Turtle Creek were the railroad towns of Port Perry, which no longer exists, and Turtle Creek, which was incorporated in 1892. Pitcairn incorporated in 1894 and the borough of Wall incorporated on the opposite bank of the creek a decade later; both grew in response to the sprawling rail-yard between them.

East Pittsburgh, Wilmerding and Trafford were all populated by the workers of the Westinghouse factories. The town of Export was established near the headwaters of Turtle Creek as a mining community, which exported coal via the Turtle Creek Branch of the PRR to industrial areas downstream and elsewhere.

=== Twenty-first century ===
At the beginning of the twenty-first century, much of the infrastructure that changed the Turtle Creek valley remained in place, but had changed in form and purpose. The Pennsylvania Railroad's main line has become Norfolk Southern's Pittsburgh Line, where heavy freight traffic still runs, but passenger service has been reduced to once per day on Amtrak's Pennsylvanian. Passengers no longer board trains at Pitcairn Station; its yards have been converted into NS's Intermodal Terminal. The Edgar Thomson Steel Works and Union Railroad still operate, now under the control of US Steel and its subsidiary Transtar. Westinghouse's railroad is gone, but his airbrake facility still operates at its original site under the name Wabtec; the Westinghouse electrical plant is now the Keystone Commons industrial park, and portions of the foundries in Trafford have become baseball facilities, with other parts awaiting redevelopment.

The Turtle Creek Branch of the Pennsylvania Railroad served out its final three decades as a privately owned short-line, the Turtle Creek Industrial Railroad, before flooding from the creek prompted its end of service and eventual conversion into part of the Westmoreland Heritage Trail. The coal mines in the Turtle Creek watershed have all closed, but the abandoned mine drainage they emit continues to adversely effect the aquatic life in the creek.

== Watershed ==
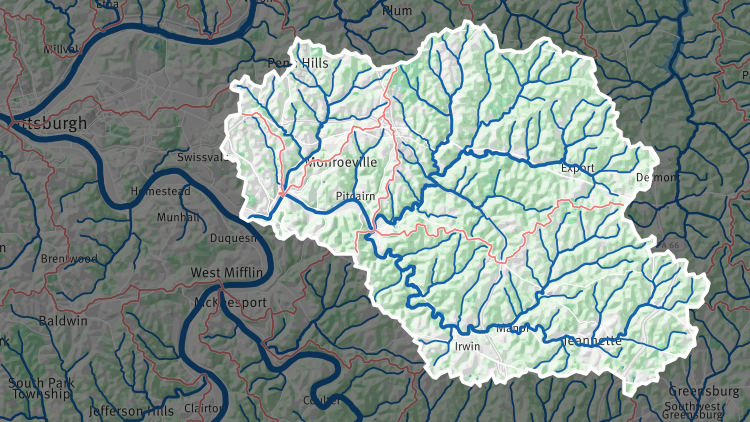
The Turtle Creek watershed is highlighted, with the dividing lines for its USGS subwatersheds shown in red.

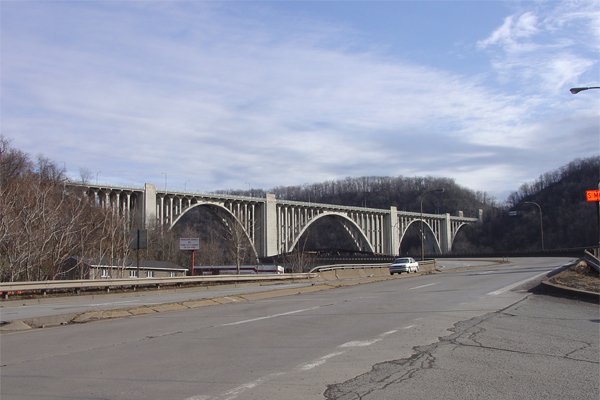
Photo of the George Westinghouse Bridge over the Turtle Creek Valley.

The Turtle Creek watershed is the region drained by Turtle Creek. Sixty-six percent of its area is located in Westmoreland County, with the balance in Allegheny County. The watershed's area is 147.41 square miles (381.79 km^{2}). It drains forests, farmlands, abandoned mines, and urban and suburban communities. The watershed includes portions of thirty-three municipalities. The lower watershed drains a heavily industrial area between the cities of Pittsburgh and McKeesport.

The number of "subwatersheds" within the Turtle Creek Watershed depends on which organization defines the boundaries of these geographical regions. The United States Geological Survey (USGS) divides the Turtle Creek Watershed into four subwatersheds, giving each a 12-digit hydrologic unit code (HUC).

The Turtle Creek Watershed Association (TCWA), motivated by guidelines which stated that a watershed should be "2 to 15 square miles" in size, has further divided most of the USGS subwatersheads into fourteen subwatershed planning units. Both the USGS's and the TCWA's defined watersheds are listed in the table in this section.

Designator	Subwatershead	Sq mi	Sq km
USGS	050200050701	67.42	132.22
TCWA	Upper Turtle Creek	12.98	33.62
TCWA	Steel's Run	4.81	12.46
TCWA	Haymaker Run	10.97	28.41
TCWA	Abers Creek	10.64	27.56
TCWA	Middle Turtle Creek	19.24	7.43
TCWA	Lyons Run	8.78	22.74
USGS	050200050702	80.63	148.92
TCWA	Upper Brush Creek	26.13	67.68
TCWA	Bushy Run	13.94	36.10
TCWA	Lower Brush Creek	17.43	45.14
USGS	050200050704	18.43	47.73
TCWA	Lower Turtle Creek	10.02	25.95
TCWA	Dirty Camp Run	3.23	8.37
TCWA	Sawmill Run	2.02	5.23
TCWA	Ardmore Run	3.16	8.18
USGS	050200050703	15.87	41.10
TCWA	Thompson Run	15.87	41.10

== Flow Alterations ==
=== Channelization ===
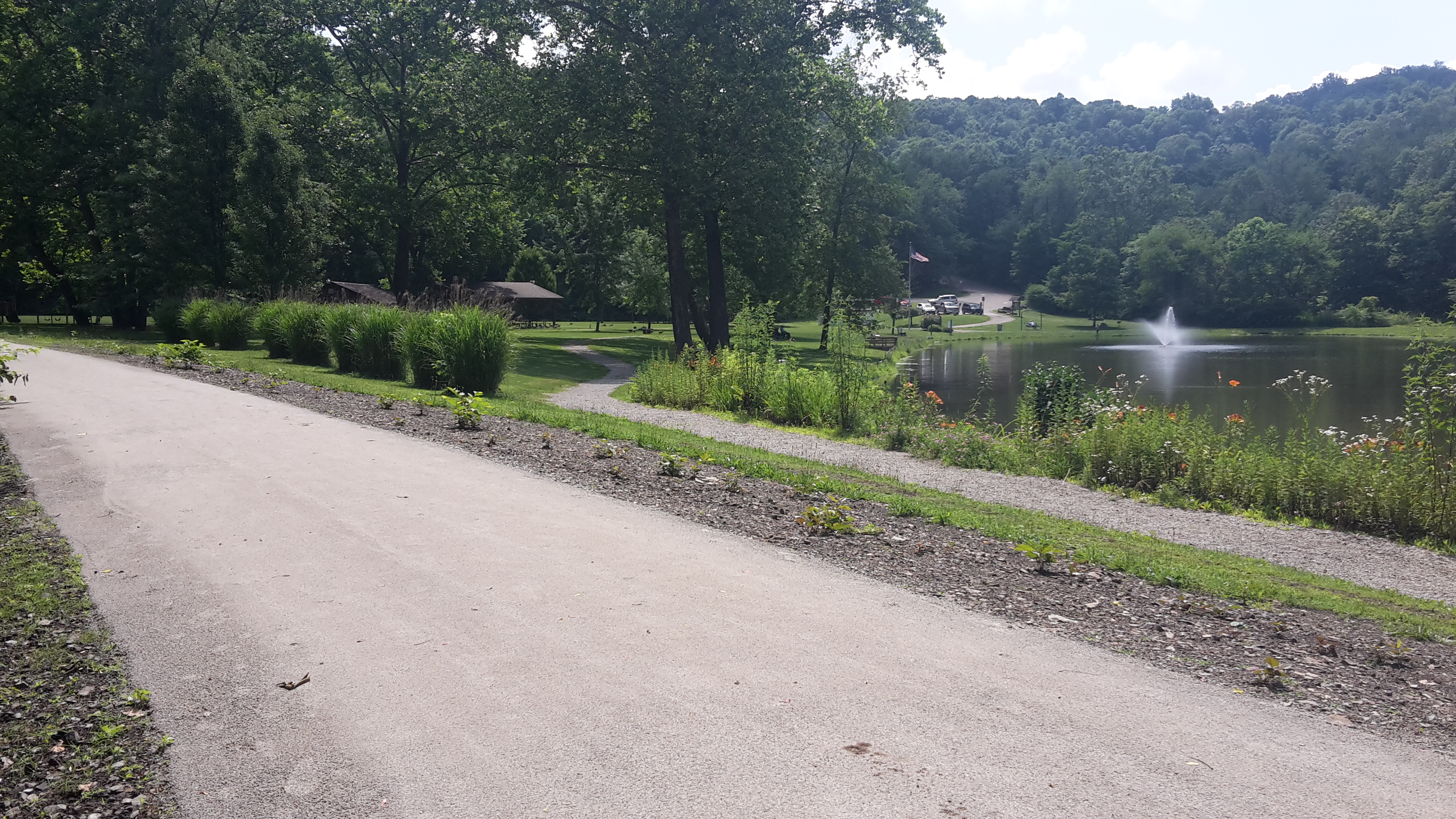
B-Y Pond in Trafford, Pennsylvania was formed when the flow of Turtle Creek was shortened to accommodate a railroad, which has since become the rail-trail in the foreground

The flow-line of mid-twentieth century Turtle Creek meandered noticeably less than it did a hundred years earlier, particularly in its lower regions between Trafford and the mouth of the creek at the Monongahela River. This artificial channelization of the creek was prompted by industrialization of the region. Diversions to suit the expanding railroads of the Pennsylvania Railroad Company had the most obvious impacts, while alterations to suit the needs of George Westinghouse's manufacturing companies and Andrew Carnegie's steel operations are also evident in changes shown in historical maps of the creek.

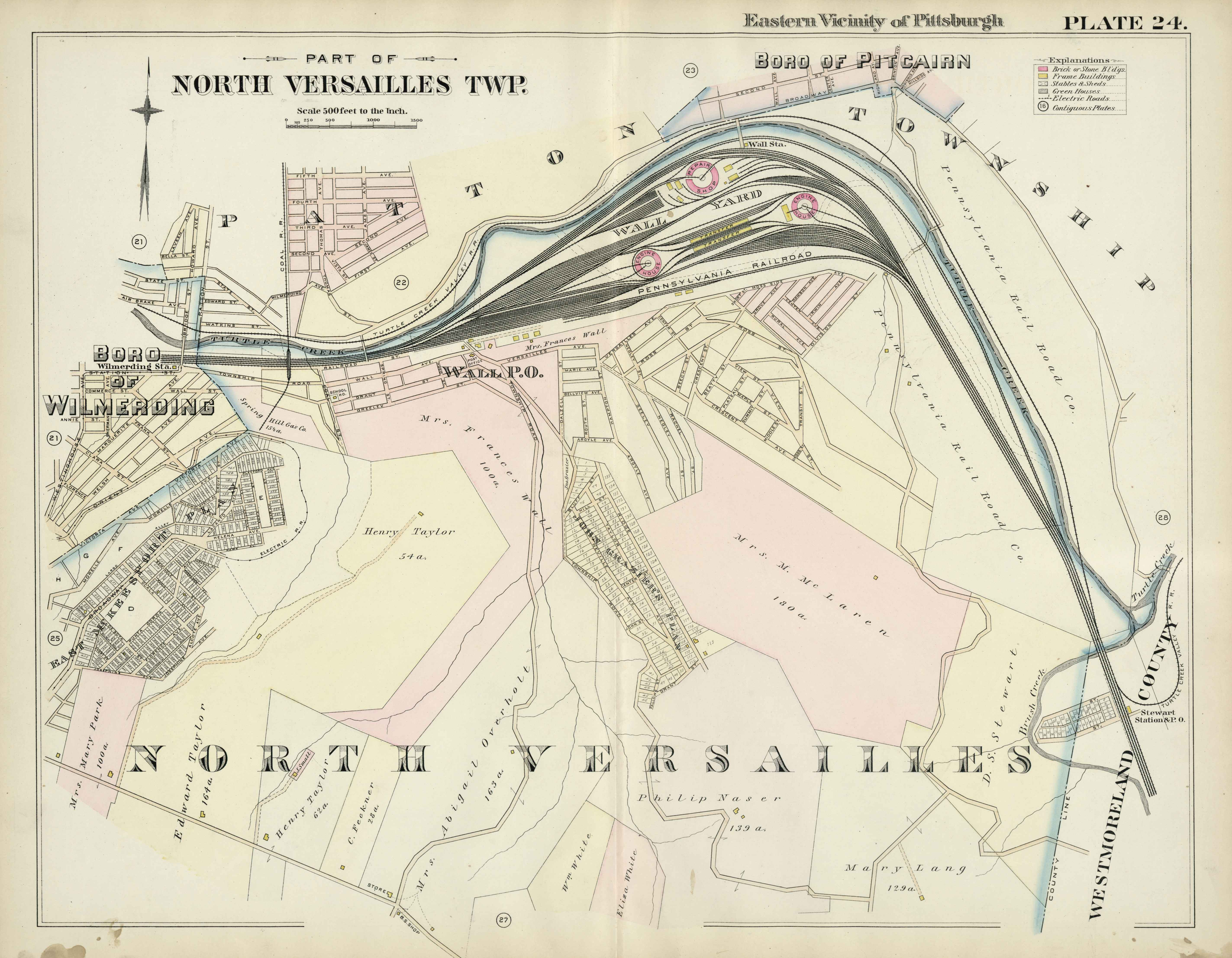
Wall Yard, 1895; the dashed lines show the flow-line of the creek before the yard was built

In 1852, the Pennsylvania Railroad Company began running its main line along the left bank of the lower section of Turtle Creek. In 1874, it acquired 215 acres (87 ha) of land for its Wall Yard (later known as Pitcairn Yard), construction of which would involve relocating much of Turtle Creek northward before the completion of the yards on the left bank of the creek in 1892. Sometime between 1903 and 1915 the creek was further diverted to straighten the tracks of the railroad on its right bank, where the Westinghouse Interworks Railway company ran its trains.

The Pennsylvania Railroad Company also diverted the flow of the creek in the Blackburn neighborhood of Trafford to create a wye (pronounced like the letter "Y") to enable its trains to switch directions there. The pond formed by part of the old creek-bed eventually took a name derived from that of Blackburn's farm and this wye, "B-Y Pond".

Turtle Creek served as part of the political boundary between what were once North Versailles and Patton townships, as well as part of the boundary between Allegheny and Westmoreland Counties. When the flow-line of the creek was altered, the political divisions were not redrawn, and so some seemingly out of place borders now exist near the banks of Turtle Creek. For example: a portion of US Steel's Edgar Thomson Works which appears to be in North Braddock is actually in North Versailles.

Businesses in Broadway Park on PA Route 130 are also in North Versailles, but have addresses in Monroeville. The Pitcairn Intermodal Terminal (formerly Pitcairn Yard, and Wall Yard before that) lies in both Monroeville and North Versailles, but, ironically, not in Pitcairn. All American Park, a baseball and softball complex built at a former Westinghouse site in Trafford, has some fields which straddle the Allegheny/Westmoreland County border.

=== Westinghouse Dams ===
By 1908, two dams were known to exist on Turtle Creek; both were built at water intakes for industrial facilities. One was at the Westinghouse Machine Company in East Pittsburgh; it was described as being low and not appreciably obstructing the flow of the stream. The Trafford dam, located just upstream of Turtle Creek's confluence with Brush Creek, was more imposing, once standing at eight feet (2.4 m) tall and 50 feet (15 m) wide in the shadow of the bridge which carried PA Route 130.

By the time the Westinghouse plant in Trafford closed, the nearby dam had outlived its original purpose. The water which pooled around the dam had found use as a swimming hole by those who would break through the fence around it, and this was considered a potential drowning hazard, in part due to the currents which could form around the dam. The dam was also hazardous to fish and other aquatic life, promoting a rise in water temperature which causes a decrease in its dissolved oxygen, while physically impeding the migration of fish up and down the stream. It not only blocked the travel of fish, but also that of local canoeists, who described the dam as "dangerous, unrunnable and unportageable". The Trafford dam was finally removed in September 2013.

=== Flood Control ===
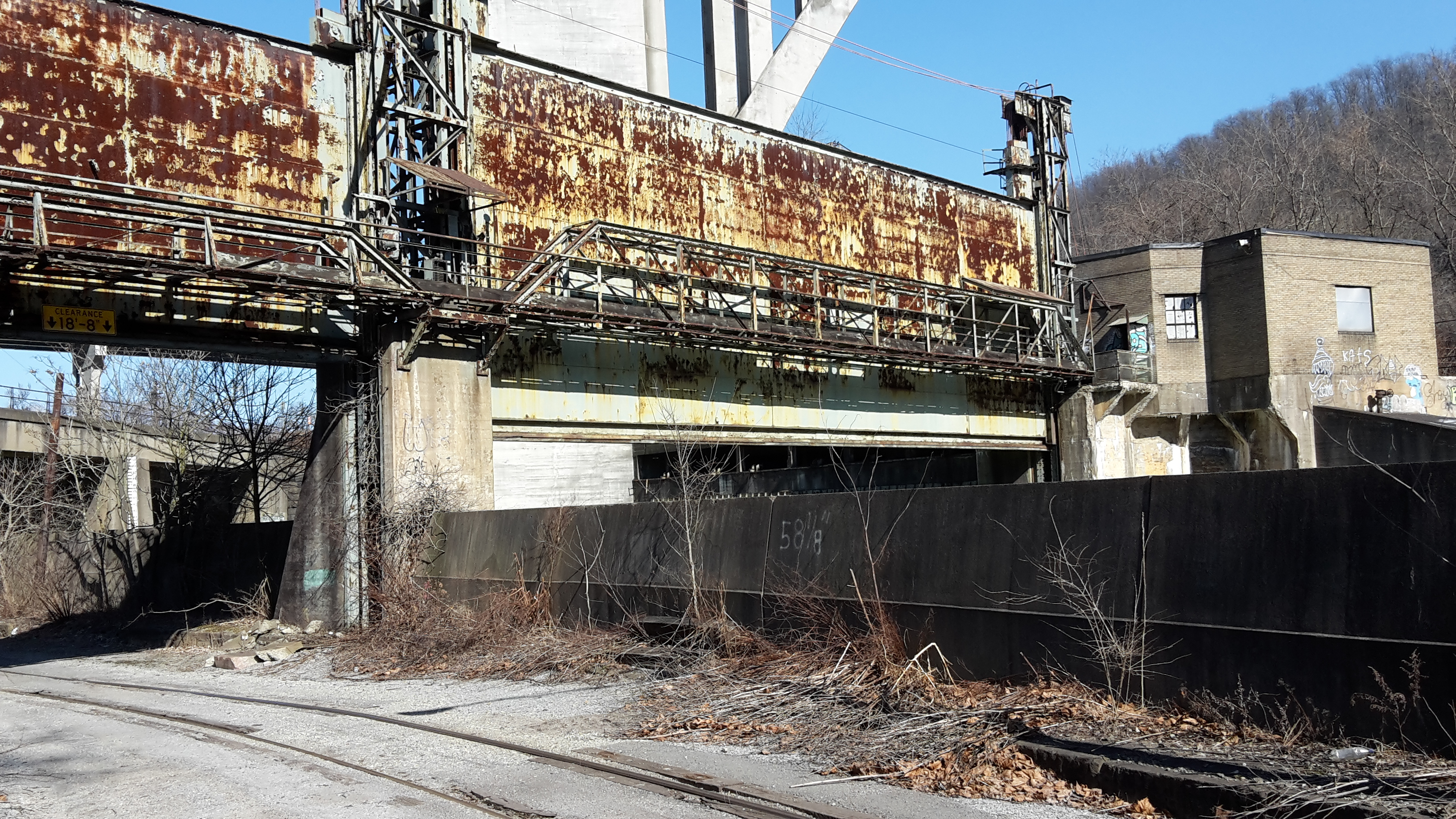
The Westinghouse Floodgates in East Pittsburgh PA in 2017

Because of their relatively low elevation with respect to that of the Monongahela river, the Westinghouse facilities in East Pittsburgh and Turtle Creek were vulnerable to back water flooding, when the waters of the Monongahela reach such a height as to cause water to back up into the Turtle Creek channel. This happened multiple times, notably during the Great St. Patrick's Day flood of 1936.

The Westinghouse Floodgate project was undertaken from 1937 to 1938 for the purpose of blocking similar floods from backing up into the Turtle Creek channel. The project consisted of two adjoining floodgates, one 80 by 30 foot (24 m × 9 m) gate which could be lowered to block the creek itself, and an adjoining 40 by 20 foot (12 m × 6 m) gate that would be simultaneously block (Old) Braddock Avenue, which runs parallel to Turtle Creek in its floodplain.

On the left bank of the creek next to the gates stands a gatehouse/pump-house, which held three 5,000 hp (3,700 kW) pumps capable of pumping 7,500 cubic feet (210 m^{3}) of water downstream per second in the event that the gates needed to be lowered. The height of the gates meant that they could withstand backwater from the Monongahela river as long as the river surface remained below 750 feet above sea level.

In 1999, the Turtle Creek Valley Council of Governments determined that operating and maintaining the facility placed too great a financial burden upon the boroughs of Wilmerding, Turtle Creek and East Pittsburgh. Photos taken in 2013 indicate the floodgate facility is no longer being maintained.

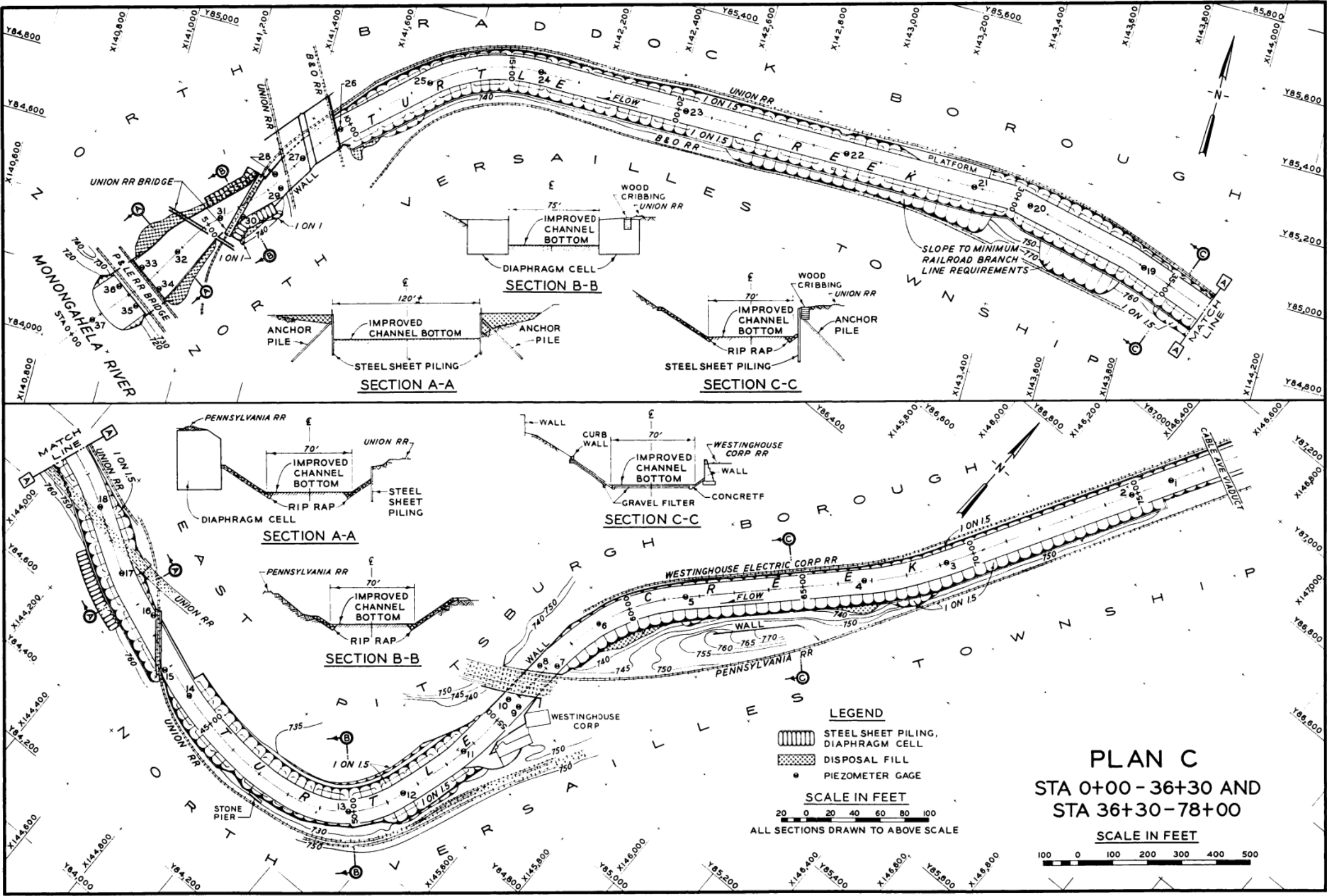
Channel improvements, lower section of Turtle Creek, as illustrated for a 1967 model by the United States Army Corps of Engineers

While the Westinghouse Floodgates protected the lower Turtle Creek Valley from backwater flooding from the Monongahela River downstream, it was not designed to protect from flash flooding pouring down from tributaries upstream. Flash floods in 1911, 1942 and 1950 all deposited rain at a rate which exceeded the capacity of Turtle Creek to drain it, and, in October 1954, the remnants of Hurricane Hazel caused what was then the flood of record by attempting to discharge 12,300 cubic feet (350 m^{3}) of water per second through a Turtle Creek channel that had a drainage capacity of only 5,100 cu ft/s (140 m^{3}/s), overflowing its banks and causing an estimated $13 million in damages (approximately $123 million in 2025).

The following year, the Turtle Creek District Flood Authority was organized to work with the Army Corps of Engineers on a massive channelization project whose design and construction continued into the next decade.

From its confluence with Brush Creek in Trafford to a point 2.2 miles (3.5 km) downstream, Turtle Creek was channelized to the extent needed to accommodate a flow equal to that caused by Hazel. For the 3.8 miles (6.1 km) downstream to the river, the channel was improved with stone and concrete walls and a similarly lined bottom, affording a 20,000 cu ft/s (570 m^{3}/s) capacity for this more heavily developed, lowest section of the creek. Construction of the concrete channel lining was completed in 1967, and control was turned over to the local flood authority, which was expected to maintain the channel at its constructed drainage capacity by occasionally removing accumulation of sediment, vegetation and other debris.

The channel proved adequate to discharge the rainfall caused by the remnants of Hurricane Agnes in June 1972 (13,200 cu ft/s or 370 m^{3}/s at East Pittsburgh), Hurricane Ivan in September 2004 (9,760 cu ft/s or 276 m^{3}/s at Wilmerding), and a non-tropical cyclone-related flash flood in June 2009 (10,100 cu ft/s or 290 m^{3}/s at Wilmerding).

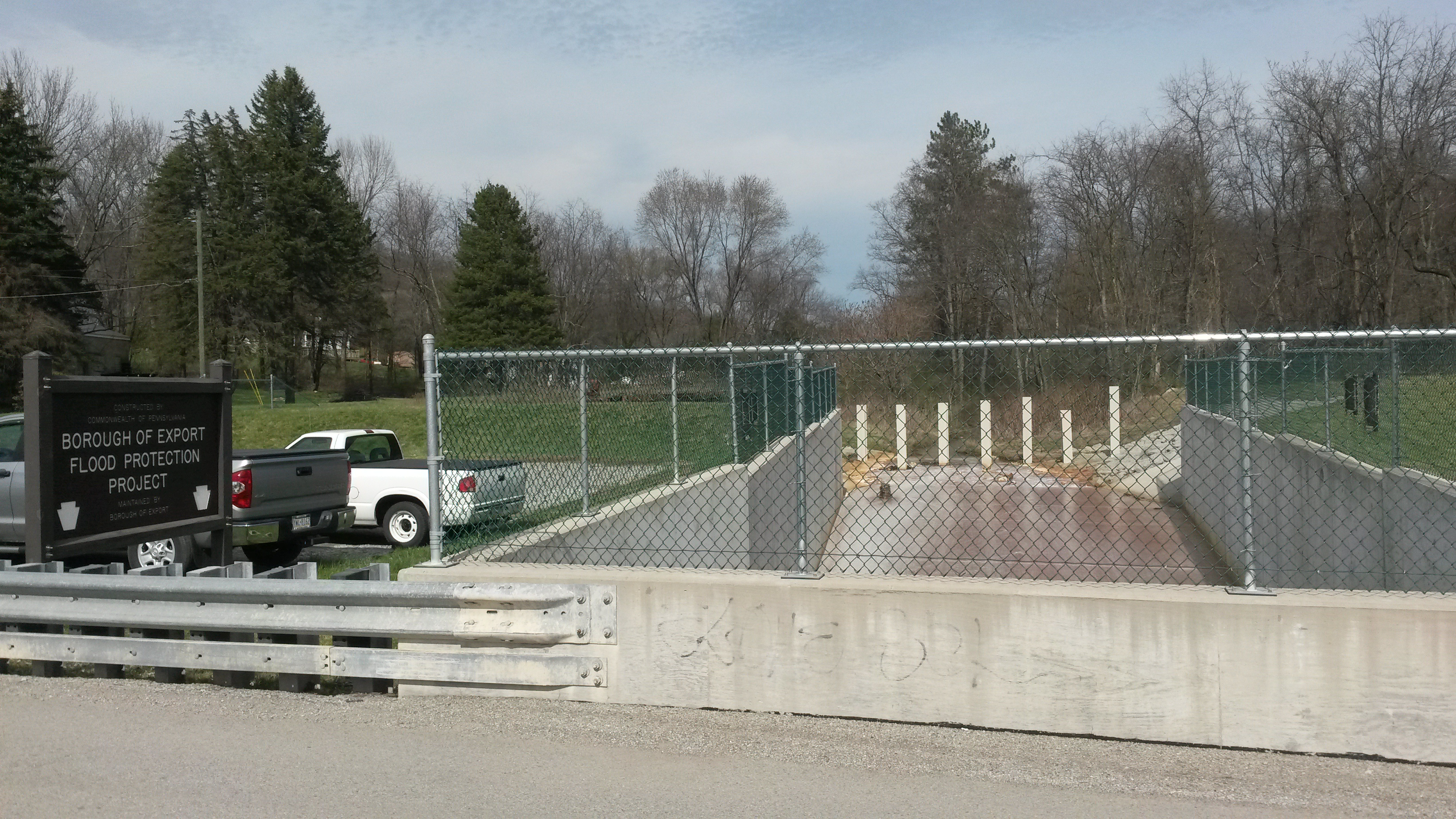
The flow of Turtle Creek is directed through a concrete flood protection culvert in Export, Pennsylvania

The June 2009 flood not only damaged the Thompson Run valley, but also flooded parts of Turtle Creek several miles upstream of the concrete-lined lower section. The town of Export, which the upper section of Turtle Creek flows through, sustained nearly $2 million in damages (approximately $2.91 million in 2025) from this flood alone.

Construction on its flood control system began in 2010, and work on the $9.8 million (approximately $14.1 million in 2025) project was completed in the fall of 2012.

The completed project begins just upstream of Puckety Drive, with a levee near the eastern edge of the Dura-Bond steel tube coating facility. The levee contains a small removable gate though which the tracks of the company's Turtle Creek Industrial Railroad pass, though the railroad's services were halted due to damage from the 2009 flood and it would never resume regular operation. The levee directs Turtle Creek into a concrete channel that runs beneath the road and continues for 1,315 feet (401 m).

At this point low flow waters are allowed into the natural Turtle Creek stream channel alongside Old William Penn Highway, while excess flow is directed underground through an additional 2,905 feet (885 m) of culvert to rejoin the meandering stream on the west side of Export. Initially, a second phase of construction with additional protective elements was planned, which was needed for "full 100-year protection", but state officials later decided that the second phase was not necessary and the protection from a "50-year storm" provided by phase one of the project would suffice.

== See also ==
- List of rivers of Pennsylvania
