= West Penn Trail =

Rail trail in Pennsylvania, United States

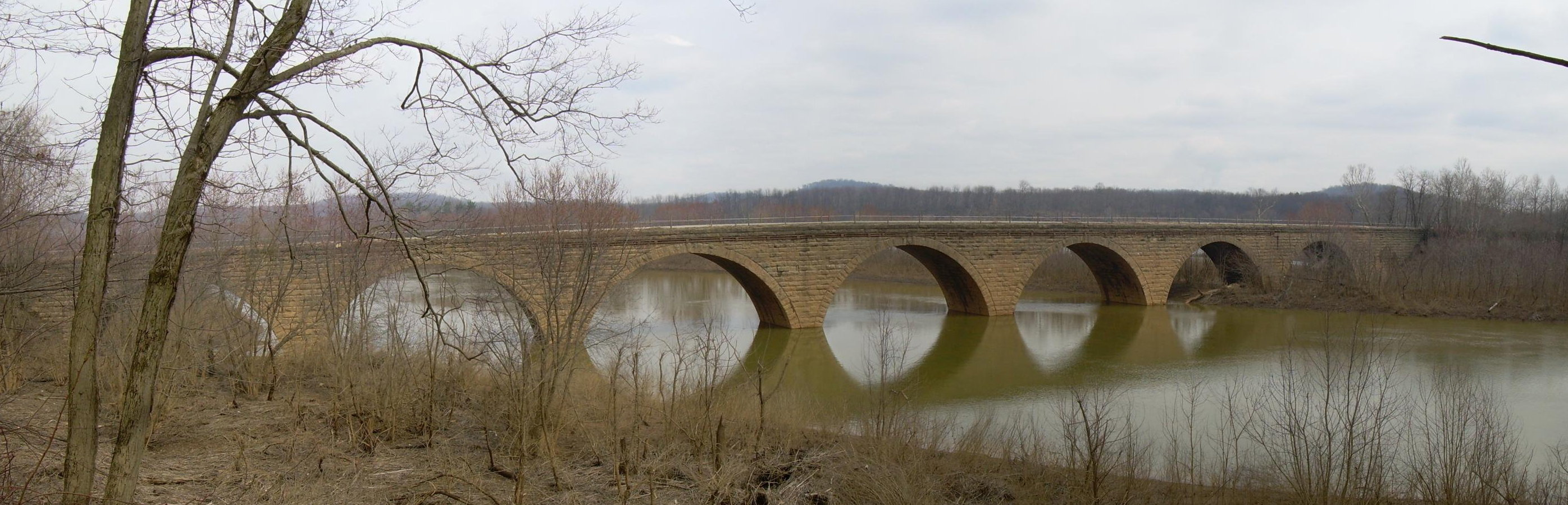
- Length: 17 mi (27 km)
- Designation: National Recreation Trail
- Use: hiking, cycling
- Difficulty: medium
- Hazards: Rough terrain, flooding (Conemaugh River Lake section)

The West Penn Trail is a 17-mile long rail trail in western Pennsylvania. It runs on old rail alignments of the Conemaugh Line near the Conemaugh River.

== See also ==
- Ghost Town Trail
- Westmoreland Heritage Trail
