= Conemaugh Line =

Rail line in Pennsylvania, United States

- Map of the Western Pennsylvania Railroad, the predecessor to the Conemaugh line

Overview
- Status: Operational
- Owner: Norfolk Southern
- Locale: Western Pennsylvania, U.S.
- Termini: New Florence, Pennsylvania, U.S.; CP-PENN in Pittsburgh, Pennsylvania, U.S.

Service
- Type: Freight rail
- System: Norfolk Southern
- Operator(s): Norfolk Southern

History
- Opened: 1863 (independent), 1865 (PRR), 1968 (PC), 1976 (Conrail), 1999 (NS)
- Closed: 1865 (independent), 1968 (PRR), 1976 (PC), 1999 (Conrail)

Technical
- Number of tracks: 1
- Track gauge: 1,435 mm (4 ft 8 1/2 in) standard gauge

The Conemaugh Line is a rail line owned and operated by the Norfolk Southern Railway in the U.S. state of Pennsylvania. The line runs from Conpit Junction, Pennsylvania (west of New Florence) northwest and southwest to Pittsburgh, following the Conemaugh, Kiskiminetas, and Allegheny rivers, on the former main line of the Conemaugh Branch of the Pennsylvania Railroad (PRR). At its east end, it merges with the Pittsburgh Line; its west end is where it merges with the Fort Wayne Line at the northwestern tip of Allegheny Commons Park. The PRR used the line as a low-grade alternate to its main line, which is now part of Norfolk Southern's Pittsburgh Line, in the Pittsburgh area.

== History ==
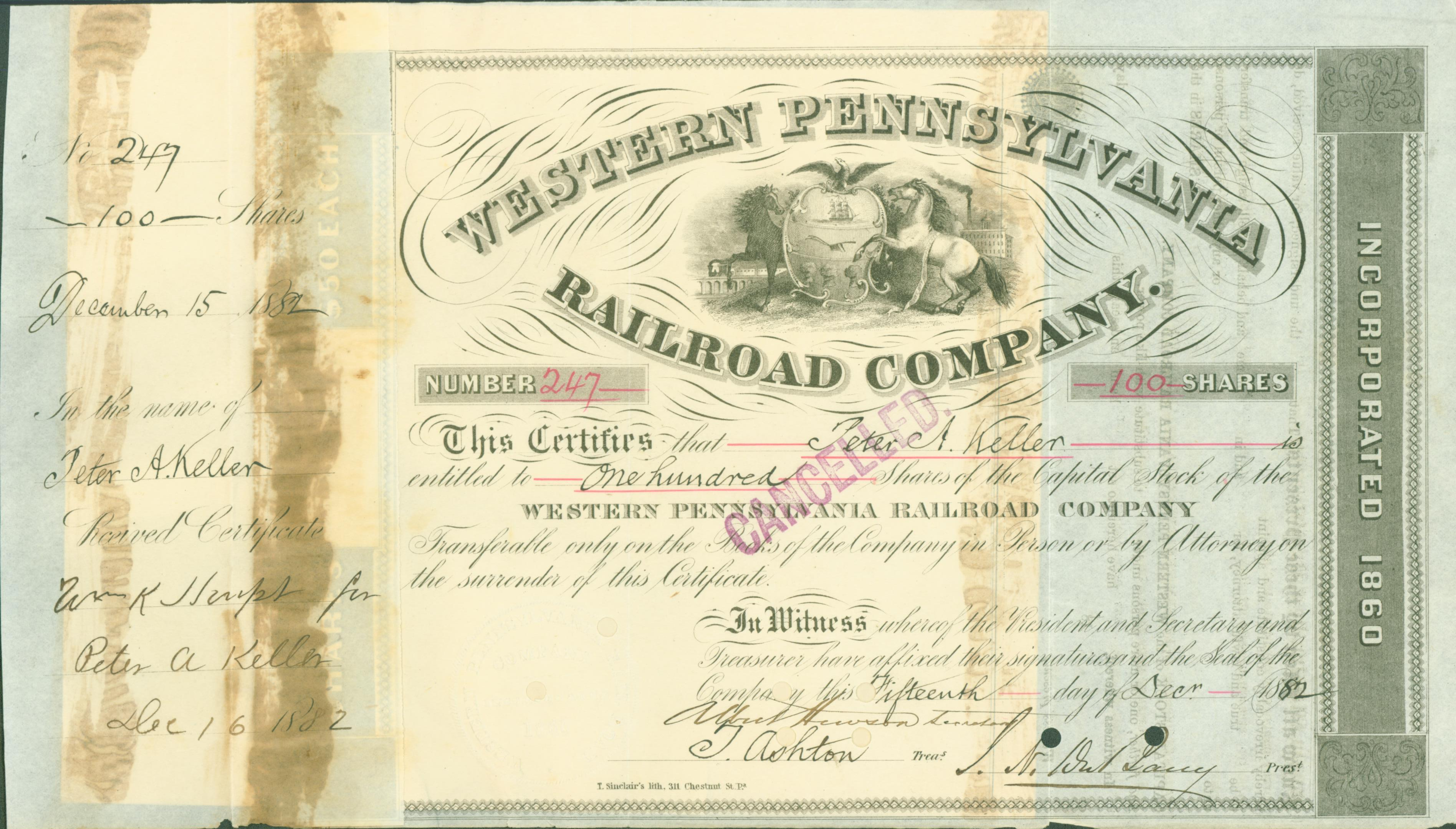
Share of the Western Pennsylvania Railroad Company, issued 15 December 1882

A short branch of the Pennsylvania Railroad from Torrance on the main line to Blairsville opened in 1851; only a small piece of this at Blairsville is still in use. The Western Pennsylvania Railroad (formerly the North Western Railroad) opened from Blairsville west to Saltsburg in 1863 and to Kiskiminetas (Kiski) Junction (near Freeport) in 1864 or 1865. The line from Freeport to Allegheny (Pittsburgh) opened in 1866. A new, more direct line east from Blairsville was built by the Western Penn in the early 1880s, meeting the PRR main line at Bolivar. The PRR's Sang Hollow Extension, now Main 3 of the Pittsburgh Line east of CP Conpit, opened east to Johnstown in 1876; the portion east of Conpit Junction was operated as a one-way line for westbound freight. All of the aforementioned lines became part of the PRR through leases and mergers, became Penn Central in 1968, and were taken over by Conrail in 1976. In the 1999 breakup of Conrail, the line was assigned to Norfolk Southern.

Around 1950, a (then double-track) 16.94-mile (27.26 km) portion of the line was relocated to a higher elevation, as part of a flood control project on the Conemaugh River. The previous alignment (built in 1907) would later become the bulk of the West Penn Trail.

The Conemaugh Line is notable for being the recipient of a variation of the PRR's cab signal system in 1940, which eliminated the wayside signals between interlockings from Conemaugh Junction to Kiski Junction, requiring the operation of trains by cab signal indication only. This system (whose visual NORAC Rule 562), modified by Conrail to operate bidirectionally. Until 2019, trackage from Pittsburgh to Kiski used wayside signaling in place of cab signals. By 2020, the line received Positive Train Control and upgrades to the signaling system. The upgrades to the signal system included the use of cab signaling across the entire Conemaugh and Pittsburgh Lines and the elimination of all wayside intermediate signals. Furthermore, all legacy signaling systems were discontinued, leaving only Safetran wayside signals at interlockings only. The line is dispatched remotely in Atlanta, GA by the Pittsburgh East dispatcher.

== See also ==
- West Penn Trail
- List of Norfolk Southern Railway lines
