= Westmoreland Heritage Trail =

Rail trail in Pennsylvania, U.S.

- Length: 18.0 mi (29.0 km)
- Location: Westmoreland, Allegheny and Indiana counties, Pennsylvania, USA
- Trailheads: Trafford, Pennsylvania; 40.385043°N 79.761981°W; Saltsburg, Pennsylvania; 40.481809°N 79.447618°W
- Use: Hiking, cycling
- Elevation change: eastern 338 feet (103 m); western: 421.4 feet (128.4 m)
- Highest point: Salem Twp, PA, near PA Route 819, 1,193.5 ft (363.8 m)
- Lowest point: east end: 856 feet (261 m) at Saltsburg, Pennsylvania; west end: 772.1 feet (235.3 m) at Trafford, Pennsylvania
- Grade: up to 2.08%
- Difficulty: Easy
- Hazards: Traffic (at road crossings)
- Surface: Crushed limestone (completed sections)
- Right of way: Turtle Creek Valley Railroad / Turtle Creek Industrial Railroad
- Website: https://westmorelandheritagetrail.com/
Trail map

The Westmoreland Heritage Trail is a partially completed rail trail in southwestern Pennsylvania. As of 2019, 18.0 miles of the 21.9 planned miles of trail are complete, including an 8.7 mile section from Saltsburg to the fringe of Delmont as well as a 9.3 mile section from Trafford to Export.

Westmoreland Heritage Trail

== Right of way ==
The trail as proposed follows a 21.9 mile long right-of-way that was once the Turtle Creek Branch of the Pennsylvania Railroad (PRR), a portion of which continued independent short-line operation as the Turtle Creek Industrial Railroad for decades after it was sold off by Conrail. The right of way proceeds from Saltsburg through Loyalhanna and Salem townships, alongside Delmont into the outskirts of Murrysville before passing through Export, the Murrysville business district, Monroeville and Penn Township, finally terminating in Trafford shortly before the remaining tracks merge into the Pittsburgh Line, which is still active. The portions of the trail that have thus far been constructed follow the former rail line rather faithfully. Ties and rails have been replaced primarily with crushed limestone (asphalt was used in short sections near road crossings), and old railroad bridges have been re-decked for use by cyclists and pedestrians.

== Elevation ==
The elevation profile of the former railway that the Westmoreland Heritage Trail follows is a complex one. Rather than simply paralleling a single river as many rail-trails do, it instead runs alongside and over multiple waters, twice approaching 1200' as the right of way transitions between different watersheds. Beginning at the planned eastern terminus at 772.1' by the location of the former Trafford North Station, the trail follows Turtle Creek toward its headwaters near PA Route 66. Here the Pennsylvania Railroad's track maps show the old right of way crossing under the route through a tunnel at 1181.1' above sea level, however this tunnel has since been buried rendering it unusable. Since the path by which the trail will cross Route 66 is not yet decided, the ultimate elevation of this crossing remains unknown. From here the trail descends towards the causeway across the Beaver Run Reservoir at an elevation of 1069.8', rising again to its current high point of 1193.5' as it passes through a cut about 1/4 mile west of route 819. From there the trail descends toward its western terminus at 856', where it merges into the West Penn Trail.

Westmoreland Heritage Trail elevation profile. Note: central section between Export and Delmont not constructed as of 2019

This descent eastward from Slickville represents the steepest gradient on the track chart at 2.08%. Between Delmont and Saltsburg the trail departs from the rail grade for several road crossings previously made on rail overpasses which have since been removed, meaning that the actual slope of the trail exceeds the rail gradient for brief stretches. These grades are higher than those of some other prominent rail trails in the area; for example the Great Allegheny Passage lists its maximum as 1.5%. However it is still well below the 5% limit set for the “running slope” of an accessible route under the Americans with Disabilities Act. Farther away from the highpoints where the streams grow deeper, such as alongside Loyalhanna Creek, the trail becomes noticeably more level. Using a three-tiered evaluation system, Trans Allegheny Trails rates this section of the WHT as “easy”, while it rates the formerly mentioned steepest section near Slickville as “moderate” in cycling difficulty.

== Points of Interest ==
=== Landmarks ===
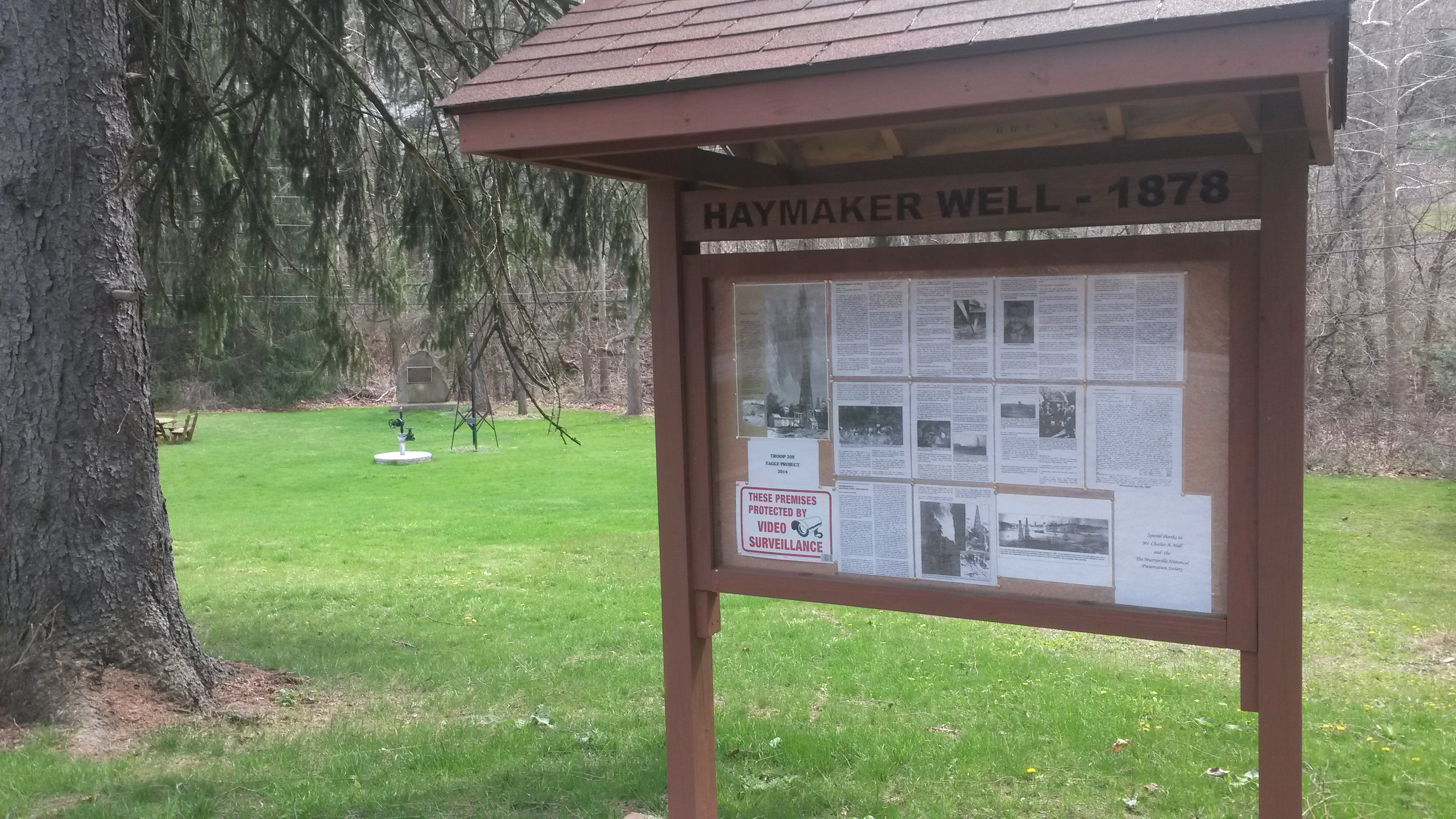
The (approximate) site where the Haymaker brothers struck natural gas in Murrysville, PA on November 3, 1878

The path of the Westmoreland Heritage Trail runs by several prominent landmarks associated with the old railroad and the industries that grew around it. The corridor of the eastern half of the trail is dotted with mine ruins and piles of slate left over from the coal industry; one of the most prominent of which is adjacent to the trail in Slickville, where the town's name is spelled out atop it. In the borough of Export sits a newly restored 1939 railroad caboose. A model derrick as well as a plaque and display stand by the trail in Murrysville, honoring the gas well tapped by the Haymaker brothers in 1878, though the exact location of that well is not known precisely. Finally, the ruins of a railroad bridge and the turn of the century brickyard once serviced by it lie across the creek from the trail in Monroeville near TCKR milepost number 2 in Trafford.

=== Parks ===
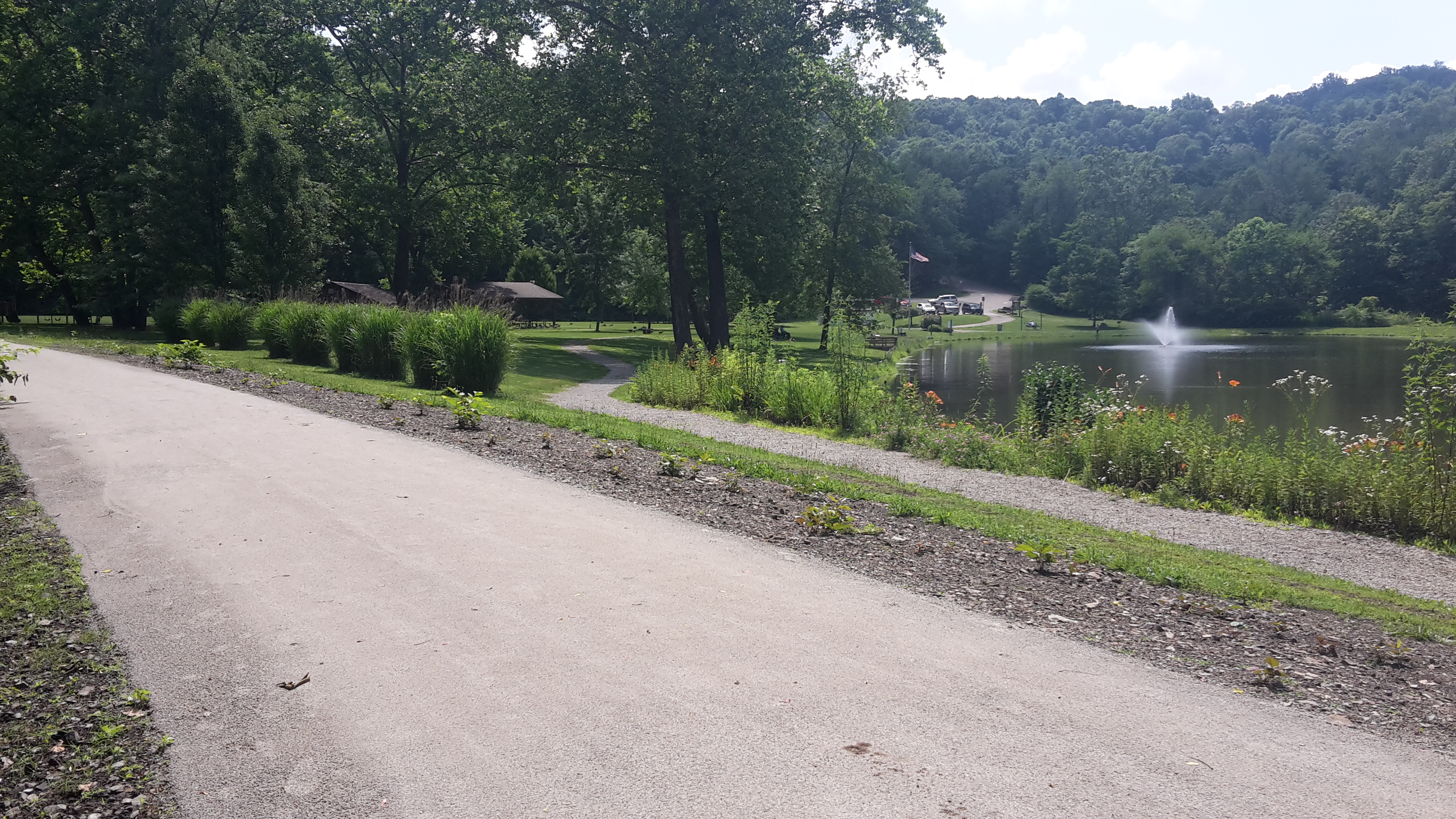
The Westmoreland Heritage Trail in B-Y Park; Trafford, PA

The trail also runs by and through several parks and recreational areas. The trail begins in Saltsburg next to a small playground. Export has plans to build a new park next to the trail that is set to extend through the borough. Farther west the trail runs alongside Murrysville's Duff Park, which has a biking trail and several hiking trails. Neighboring Monroeville owns several parcels of land across the water from the trail, including Alpine Park and Valley Park, however a lack of nearby bridges over Turtle Creek currently limits access to them. The last major park the trail runs through before its current western terminus is B-Y Park in Trafford, which has picnic pavilions and a pond that is used for fishing and ice skating, depending on the season.

== Construction history ==
=== Completed and planned ===
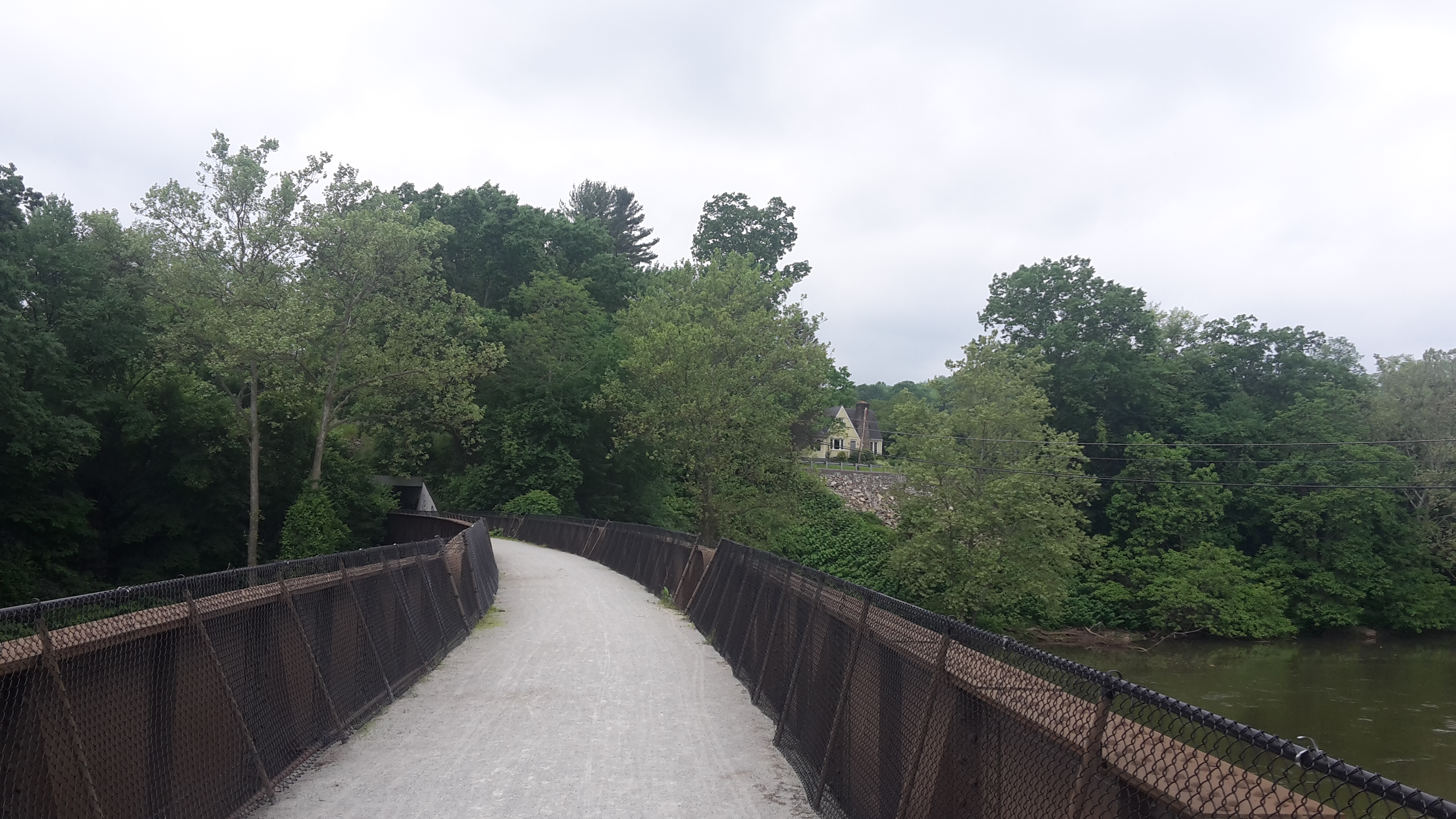
The WHT crosses over the Conemaugh River and under Rt 981 in Loyalhanna Township, PA

Nearly nine years passed between the time the discussion of the WHT began in 1998 and when the first section was built. With this first five-mile segment from Saltsburg to Slickville completed, momentum for development of the trail continued to grow, and a 3.7 mile westward extension towards Delmont was opened in 2013. The following year, trail developers set their sights on the Turtle Creek valley, when they raised the funds to purchase the right of way of the Turtle Creek Industrial Railway. Construction on a 5.9 mile section of this corridor between Trafford and Monroeville was completed in the fall of 2017, and construction of a further 3.4 mile section from Murrysville to Export was completed in the summer of 2019.

=== Future goals ===
Which section will be built next and when is not yet certain. The future connection between Export and Delmont is complicated by the need to cross PA route 66, a busy highway once traversed by a railroad tunnel that is now buried. In 2018 a grant was awarded to fund a study of the possible development of the trail on this ~4 mile segment. On the western front, expansion from Trafford must first involve acquisition of the rights to the final fraction of a mile of the Turtle Creek Industrial Railway, currently owned by Norfolk Southern. From here the trail could continue alongside Turtle Creek through East Pittsburgh, and some proposed trail maps imply that this could be done along the abandoned East Pittsburgh Branch of the PRR, where the Westinghouse Interworks Railway once ran.

== Connecting trails ==
=== Mega Greenways ===
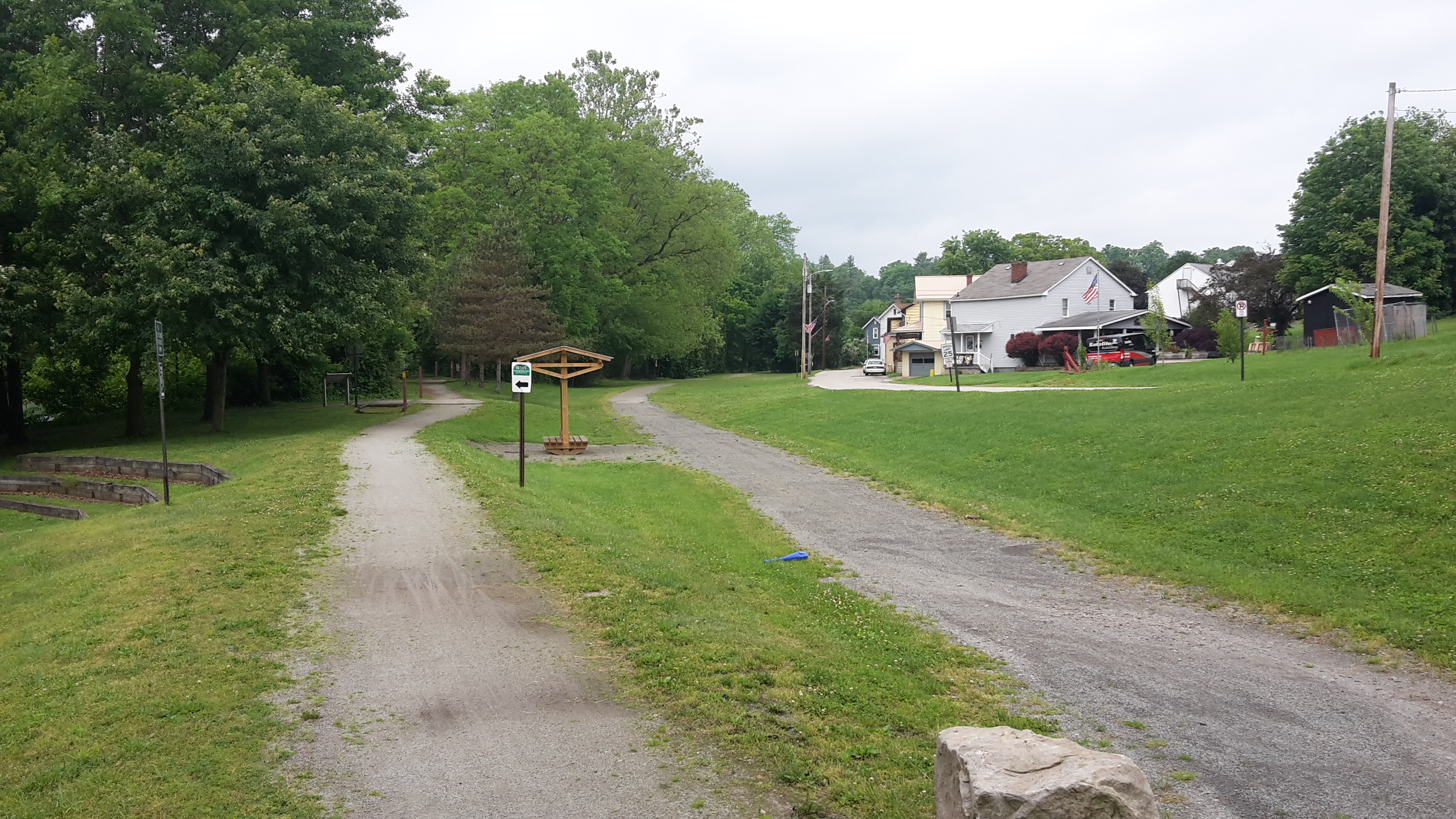
The Westmoreland Heritage Trail (left) meets the West Penn Trail in Saltsburg, PA

At its eastern terminus, the WHT connects seamlessly to the West Penn Trail, which is part of the 320 mile Pittsburgh-to-Harrisburg Main Line Canal Greenway. On its western end the Westmoreland Heritage Trail has no connections as of yet, however continuing the trail downstream along Turtle Creek and through Braddock would allow the WHT to connect to the Steel Valley Trail, a connection that members of both respective trail councils have expressed support in making. This would link the WHT with the Great Allegheny Passage, a 150-mile rail-trail from Pittsburgh to Cumberland, Maryland, which, along with the Chesapeake and Ohio Canal towpath trail, forms a continuous hiking and biking trail between Pittsburgh and Washington, DC.

=== Rough Diamond Trail Project ===
The Westmoreland Heritage Trail is also part of the Rough Diamond Trail Project, a circuit of completed and proposed trails between Pittsburgh, Freeport, Saltsburg and Trafford that is being promoted by locally born actor David Conrad He has produced and starred in two videos thus far about this project. The first shows the WHT only briefly, while the second features Conrad riding through a few different sections of the trail, which includes the Turtle Creek gorge before the railroad tracks were removed.
