= Turtle Creek Industrial Railroad =

Former short line freight railroad in western Pennsylvania, United States

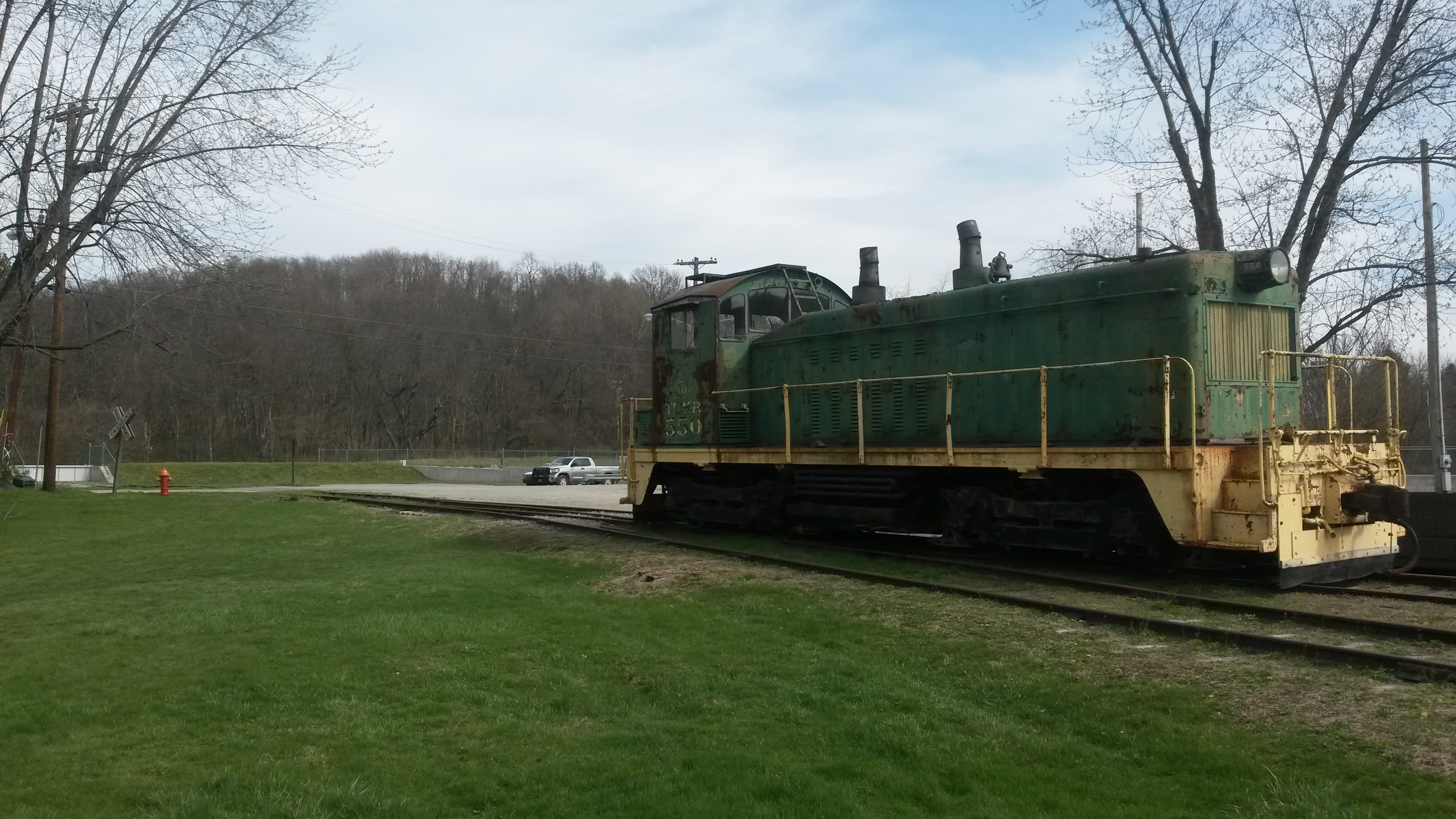
- Turtle Creek Industrial Railroad locomotive #550 in Export, PA

Overview
- Headquarters: Export, Pennsylvania
- Reporting mark: TCKR
- Locale: Westmoreland and Allegheny counties, Pennsylvania, USA
- Dates of operation: 1982–2009
- Predecessor: Turtle Creek Industrial Track of the Consolidated Rail Corporation
- Successor: Westmoreland Heritage Trail

Technical
- Track gauge: 4 ft 8 1/2 in (1,435 mm) standard gauge
- Length: 10.7 miles (17.2 km)

The Turtle Creek Industrial Railroad (reporting mark TCKR) was a short line freight railroad that operated in western Pennsylvania between the boroughs of Export and Trafford, where it connected to the Pittsburgh Line. The TCKR was a wholly owned subsidiary of the Dura-Bond Corporation, a steel products company headquartered in Export. The company purchased the railroad from Conrail (the successor to the Pennsylvania Railroad) in 1982. For the next 27 years, three to five trains per week made the round trip along just over ten miles (16 km) of track, delivering materials such as steel pipe to the shortline's parent company in Export and lumber to lumber yards in neighboring Murrysville. In the shortline's heyday, trains of typically about four cars in length were hauled by one of the railroad's two 1940s era switch engines, operated by a two-man crew. The railroad was in service until 2009, when flash flooding of Turtle Creek severely damaged the TCKR's tracks which ran adjacent to the stream. After cessation of service, most of the right-of-way was sold to Westmoreland County to become part of the Westmoreland Heritage Trail.

Turtle Creek Industrial Railroad

== Founding and acquisition by Pennsylvania RR: 1886-1982 ==
The Turtle Creek Industrial Railroad traces its origins back to 1886, when George Westinghouse chartered what was then called the Turtle Creek Valley Railroad with the hopes of exploiting the natural gas fields in Murrysville. At its westernmost point, the line began in East Pittsburgh where it dovetailed into Andrew Carnegie's Union Railroad and then ran eastward along the right bank of Turtle Creek to a junction near SZ tower. In Trafford, it intersected the main line of the Pennsylvania Railroad before proceeding farther up the Turtle Creek Valley to Murrysville. Service on the line began to Murrysville in 1891 and was extended to Export the following year. A branch along Lyons Run was built in 1892 or 1893, which ran 3.86 miles (6.21 km) from Saunders Station to Pleasant Valley. In 1917 the primary line was extended eastward from Export to the mines in Slickville.

The Pennsylvania Railroad Company began operating the line in 1891 and purchased it outright in 1903. It assigned names to these new branches of its expanding rail network. The portion which ran downstream from Trafford on the right bank of the Turtle Creek waterway would be dubbed the East Pittsburgh Branch and was leased back to the Westinghouse Company, which operated its Interworks Railway on the tracks until a flood control project on Turtle Creek broke apart the tracks in 1962. The Lyons Run Branch was used to transport coal from the mines in Pleasant Valley; it was retired in 1950 and the Pennsylvania Turnpike was extended over part of its path the following year. The section which ran up the main stem of Turtle Creek from Trafford through Export was called the Turtle Creek Branch; of the three branches it would have the longest history as an active rail line, which would culminate with its service as the Turtle Creek Industrial Railroad.

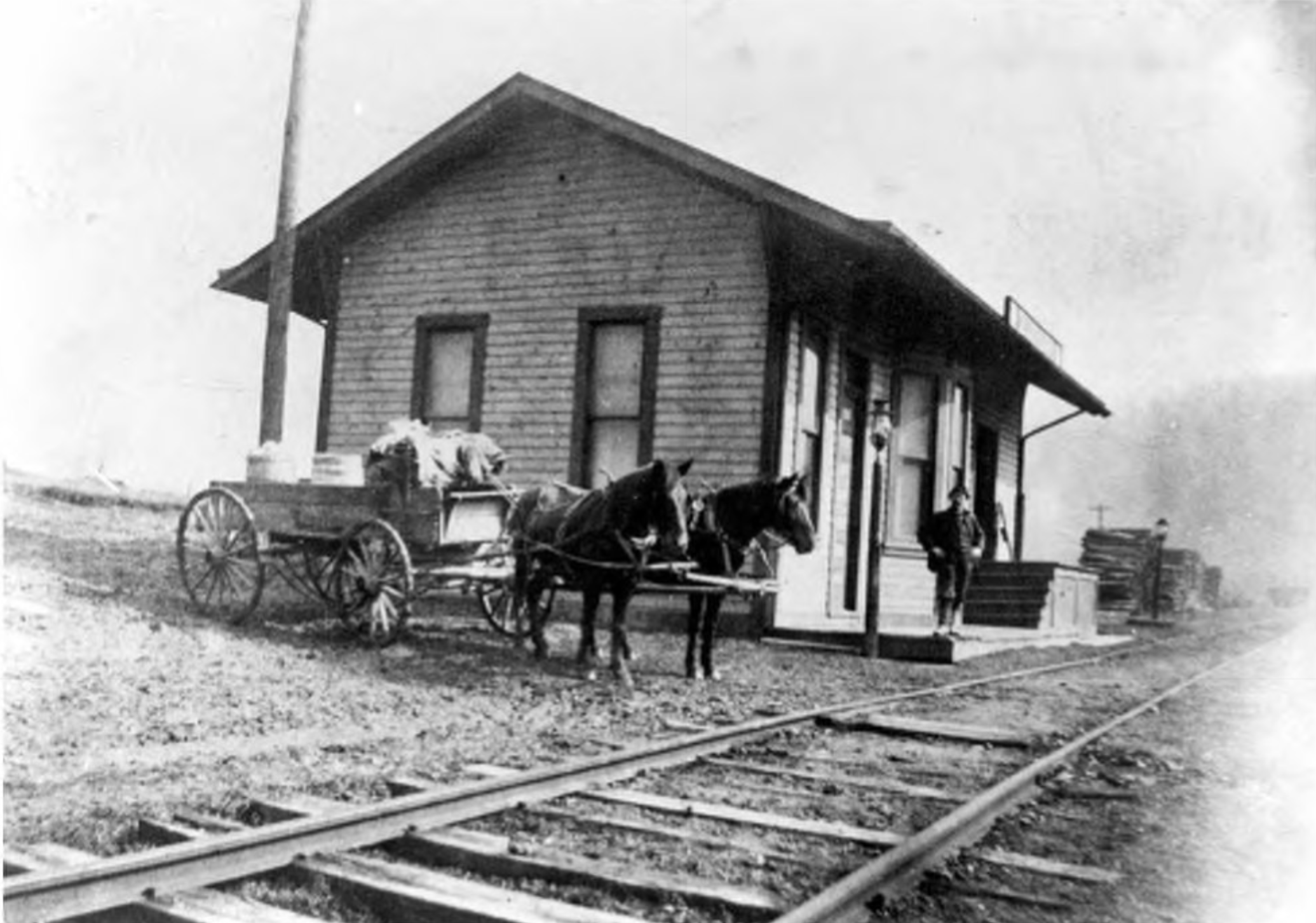
A circa 1900 photo depicts Murrysville station next to what was originally the Turtle Creek Valley Railroad. This right of way eventually became the TCKR.

At its peak the Turtle Creek Branch extended from Westinghouse's facilities in Trafford all the way through Saltsburg, and its primary cargo was not gas but coal. Passenger service to and from Pittsburgh and points west was also popular, first served by steam engine trains and later by a single car diesel vehicle known as the Doodlebug. Vehicles made stops in North Trafford, Blackburn, Saunders, Murrysville, Newlonsburg and Export. At its peak, an average of 1000 passengers each weekend would ride this rail line down to Pittsburgh, but passenger service eventually declined, ultimately ending in 1936. Coal shipments declined as well as mines closed, and businesses located along Old and New William Penn Highway became the railroad's only customers.

In 1968 the owner of the Turtle Creek Branch, the Pennsylvania Railroad Company, merged with New York Central Railroad and the New York, New Haven and Hartford Railroad to form Penn Central, which declared bankruptcy only two years later. A new company, Conrail, was formed to take over the freight lines of the short-lived Penn Central; it renamed its "Branches" as "Industrial Tracks", giving the Turtle Creek railroad its penultimate name: The Turtle Creek Industrial Track. In 1980, Congress passed the Staggers Rail Act which deregulated the rail industry, permitting carriers to sell-off unprofitable lines. Subsequently, Conrail announced that it was looking to abandon several lines, and its Turtle Creek Industrial Track was among them.

== Sale from Conrail to Dura-Bond: 1982 ==
In November 1981, Conrail announced intention to abandon its unprofitable Turtle Creek Valley Line. At the time several businesses relied on it for shipments, including Dura-Bond, an Export-based protective coating company owned by the Norris family. Wayne Norris then sized up the company's situation: "Losing this line would be inconvenient for the other companies, but it would be devastating for us". He noted that Dura-Bond needed to move large steel products too big and heavy to ship by truck, a number of truck strikes had occurred in the area and his company needed a reliable, competitive transportation alternative. They were faced with a choice: move their company to a new location served by rail, subsidize Conrail's existing operations, or purchase the railroad. After discussing their options, Dura-Bond decided to purchase the railroad outright, taking on other businesses along the line as paying customers. They renamed the railroad the "Turtle Creek Industrial Railroad" and would own and operate it themselves as a privately owned subsidiary company.

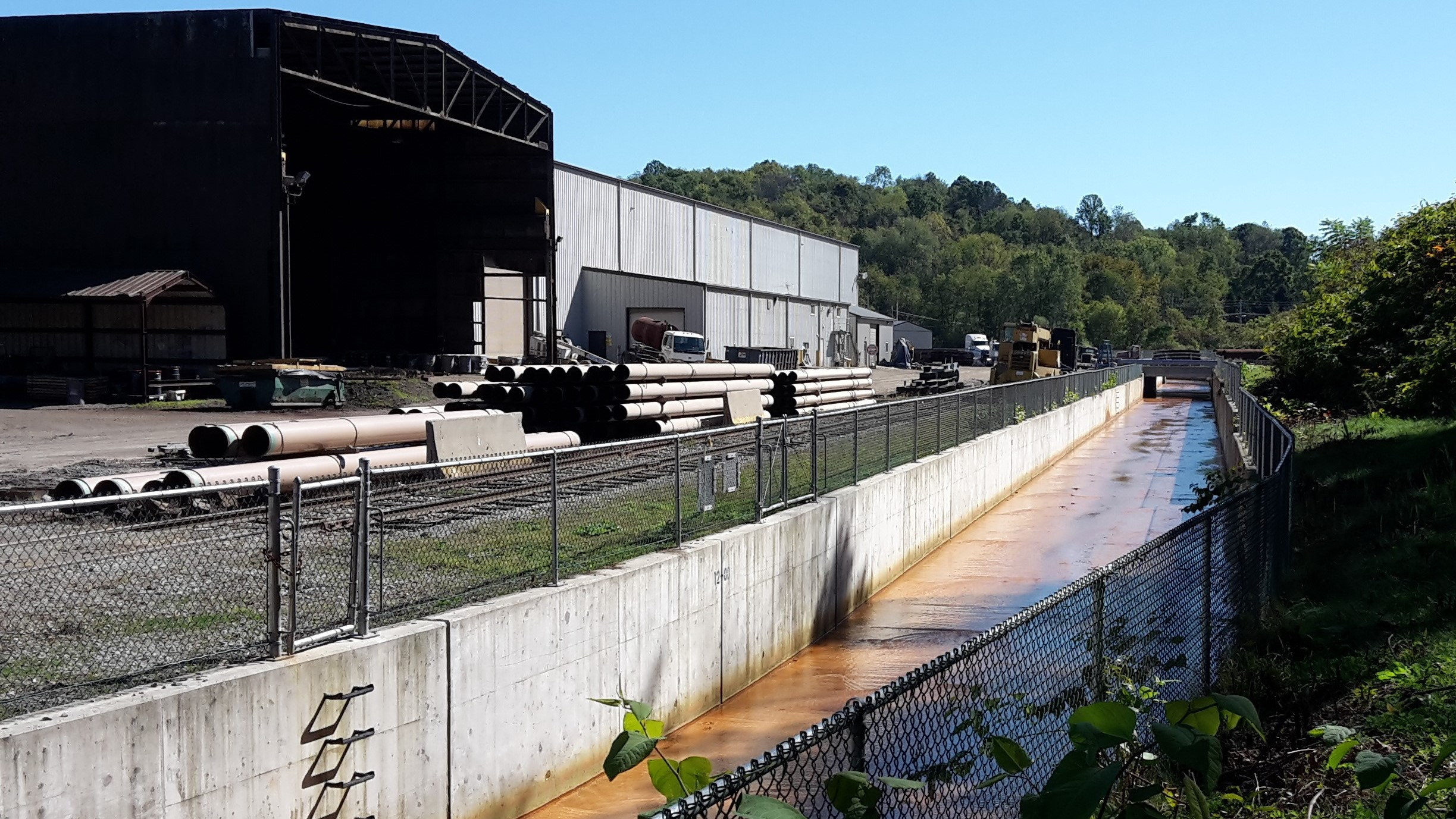
The Dura-Bond steel pipe coating company adjacent to the track of the TCKR in Export, PA (note: the flood protection channel in this photo was not constructed until after the railroad had ceased operations)

To defray some of the startup costs, Dura-Bond received a $313,240 grant from the commonwealth of Pennsylvania. Governor Dick Thornburgh, who traveled to Export for the newly acquired railroad's opening ceremony, justified the grant, remarking that the rail service would preserve more than 700 industrial jobs in Westmoreland County. The Westmoreland County Industrial Development Authority also backed the project with low interest revenue bonds. The purchase price of the line would be $125,000, but this relatively low number reflected something all of the parties in the deal knew: the track was in very poor condition. Dura-Bond secured a bank loan to help pay the additional costs that it knew would soon come.

The newly purchased short-line railroad began operations on June 6, 1982, and experienced 12 derailments in its first month. Since the trains were limited to a maximum of 10 miles per hour (16 km/h), these were not necessarily as dramatic as the word "derailment" can imply but were still disruptive enough for Dura-Bond to quickly hire a contractor to perform two months' worth of track repair on an expedited basis. In addition to its general state of disrepair that came from decades of neglect, the track was also too steeply banked around its bends, causing the TCKR's relatively slow, heavy trains to exert too much pressure on the inner rail as they went through turns. Track rehabilitation costs would total $418,000 in the first year, when the railroad lost money, and $225,000 in the second year, when it hoped to break even. These were anticipated costs, as Dura-Bond had committed to operating the rail line for at least two years and could not sell it for at least five as conditions of the acquisition.

== Short line operations: 1982-2009 ==
A Norris family engineer summarized the company's key to its plan for turning the railroad to profitability, "Conrail needed a seven man crew to run the line. We do it with two men and a dog." In addition to the engineer's pit-bull, the TCKR employed 4 people, nominally two engineers and two brakemen. These employees would do everything including driving the trains, keeping the railroad's 1940s era locomotives running and maintaining the track. They also had the skills and equipment to re-rail minor derailments, as well as replace damaged rail ties using only hand tools if need be.

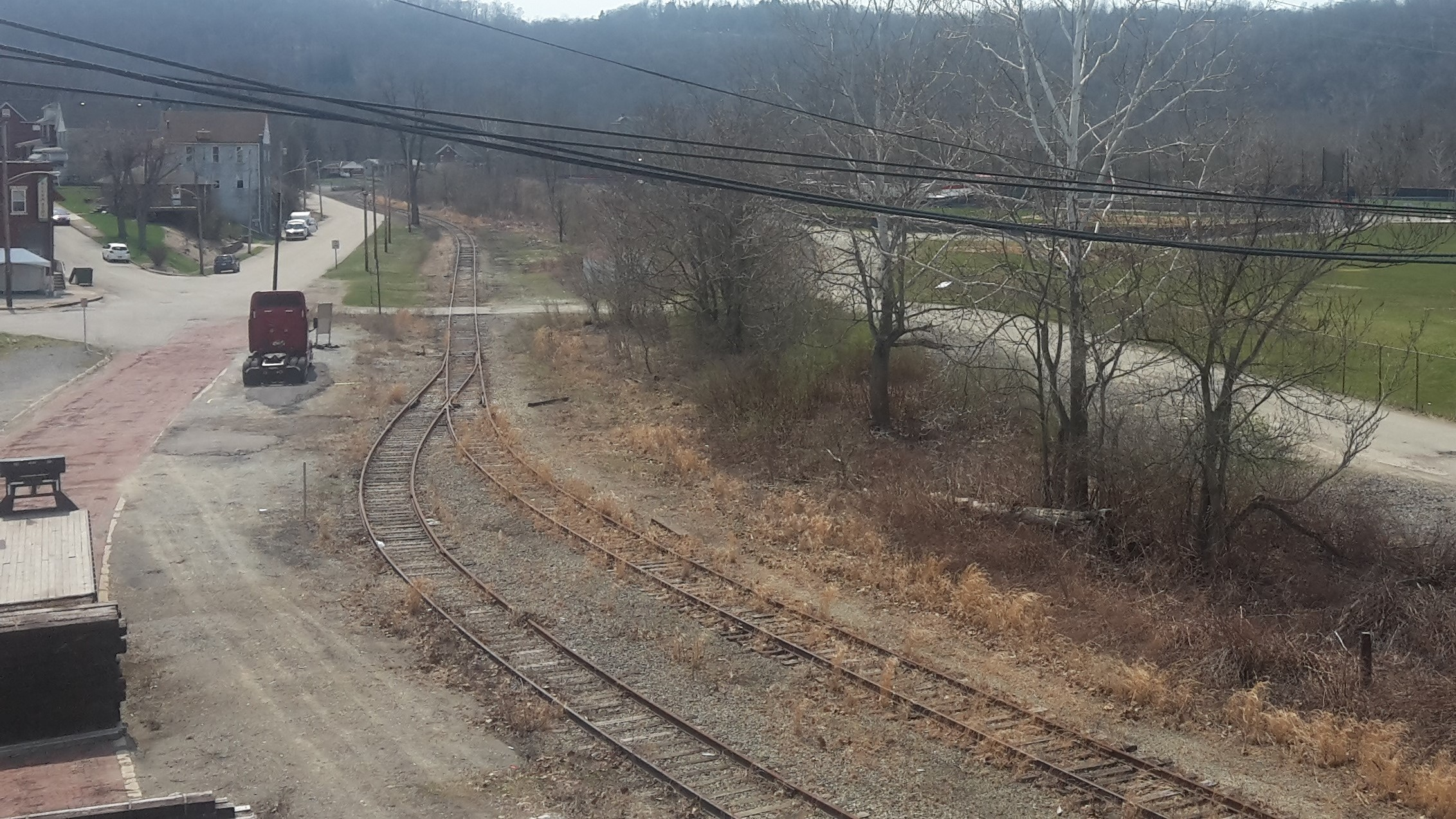
The siding in Trafford, PA where trains were exchanged between TCKR locomotives and those of Conrail and its successor Norfolk Southern

As many as three round trips per day were possible on the line, and Dura-Bond believed that trains of up to 10 cars could be safely transported. Trains running 3-5 times per week, averaging 4 cars per train, would come to be described as typical. A routine daily shipment began with Conrail dropping off a train in Trafford. Next Conrail would pick up a train of empty cars to be returned that had been previously left there by the TCKR. Later that day a TCKR locomotive would pick up the loaded train that had been left by Conrail and take it to Murrysville and/or Export for distribution to customers. Cargo could include steel products, lumber, aluminum and rubber, and a single train could contain cars destined for multiple different locations. Sidings positioned along the single track in Trafford, Murrysville and Export made it possible for a TCKR locomotive to run around a train parked at any of those places, allowing it to detach cars from the train and push them to their individual recipients. Once deliveries had been made, the process would be reversed, as the short line's locomotive would gather and return empty cars to be towed back to Trafford where they would be picked up again by Conrail. The TCKR's staff promised to work to keep the freight cars moving, stating that the cars "cost you money" when just sitting on a siding. This won praise from the customers; two that were interviewed after the first year Dura-Bond owned the railroad commented that service had improved dramatically. One noted that shipments which could be delayed over a week on the transfer track when Conrail owned and operated the line were arriving the same day under the new local ownership and management.

Despite the positive reviews and the efforts to expand the railroad's customer base, the number of shippers reported on the line was at its highest when it first began operations and would decline slowly over the next three decades. A preliminary report indicated that the newly acquired short-line had 10 customers, which, together with Dura-Bond, would total 11 patrons of the railroad. These were Beckwith Machinery, Building Components, Delmont Builders, 84 Lumber, Export Tire, Gateway Packaging, J&M Machinery, Long Mill Rubber, National Aluminum and Weyerhaeuser. A total of 9 shippers were reported for the TCKR later in 1982 and 1983. This had dropped again to 7 by 1984, 5 in 1991 and 4 in 1996. In 2009 this number had dwindled to just 2: Dura-Bond itself and the lumber company Weyerhaeuser, which had long been the railroad's biggest customer.

When it first started operations in 1982, the company estimated it would be hauling 500-1000 cars per year at first and would eventually have to haul "about 1500 cars a year" to turn a profit, and "would like to haul more like 2000" if the economy picked up. Subsequent reports do not indicate that goal was ever met. In 1991 about 500 cars/year was the reported haul; circa 1996 it was again nearly 500; in 1999 it was about 700 cars per year. Between those years Wayne Norris commented that his railroad was making enough money to pay for its basic maintenance, but not enough to replace a locomotive. (The railroad had paid $44,000 for its primary locomotive in 1982 and charged shippers $250 per car when it began operations that year.) In 2009 an engineering survey indicated that only 150 cars per year were traveling over the railroad's bridges. Norris attributed part of the drop off in business to the closure of Pittsburgh-based steel mills.

The railroad was kept running despite falling short of its initial goals of expanding its shipping business. This was partly out of the need to ship materials to the railroad's parent company, but something less tangible may have also factored in. When his company first purchased the railroad, Wayne Norris admitted nostalgia played "a small role" in his decision to buy and operate it. His words shed further light on this: "I was born and raised here in Export. I remember steam engines rolling through here. The trains were a part of our lives..I'm proud to be running a piece of Turtle Creek Valley history... Coal gave this borough its name... I'd read somewhere that a community suffers psychologically when it loses its rail service, and I believe there's some truth in it."

== End of service and conversion to rail-trail: 2009-2019 ==
On the night of June 16–17, 2009, a powerful storm struck western Pennsylvania causing flash flooding along many streams and creeks, including Turtle Creek. Flooding in the borough of Export was particularly bad; its mayor commented that he had not seen water so high since the 1960s. In addition to damaging Dura-Bond's main facility, the water washed out five feet of the embankment that the Turtle Creek Industrial Railroad rested on. Dura-Bond reported approximately $1 million in uninsured losses in addition to $1/4 million in losses to its railroad. Governor Ed Rendell requested federal aid to deal with the impact or the storms, however this request was denied as the damages were not determined to be of such severity and magnitude to exceed the ability of state and local agencies to deal with them. The flooding caused an extended outage of rail service, during which the only remaining customer on the line made arrangements to have rail cars sent to their facility via truck.

=== The rails become a trail ===
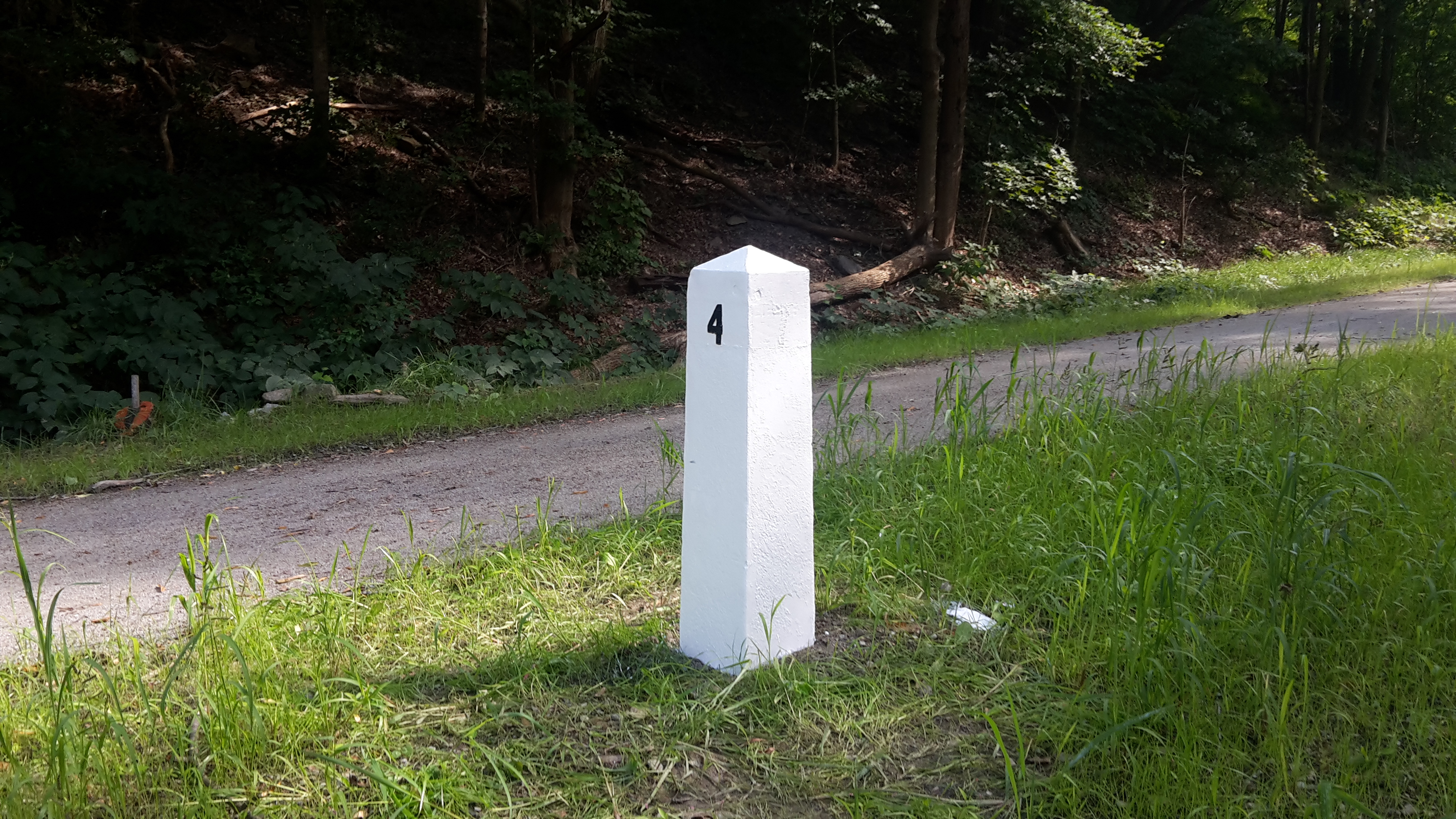
A PRR-standard TCKR milepost next to the former railroad, now part of the Westmoreland Heritage Trail

The Regional Trail Corporation had long expressed interest in creating a rail-trail along the path of the TCKR, though initially the railroad's owners did not share this interest. Sensing that the flood may have changed this, in 2011 the RTC and Westmoreland County put together an extensive plan to convert the railroad to a greenway. In 2013 the TCKR officially filed for a discontinuation of service, having previously acknowledged that service actually ended in 2009. Soon thereafter, an agreement was finalized to sell most of the railroad to Westmoreland County for the appraised value of $863,000. Dura-Bond president Wayne Norris acknowledged that continuing to operate the railroad would result in "a lot of flood related costs", noting a general trend of water flowing into the Turtle Creek valley more rapidly than in the past and attributing the increased runoff to increased suburban development in the watershed. Conversion of the railroad proceeded in phases, with a portion being completed in 2017 and the remainder in 2019.

A few sections of TCKR track remained in place after this rail trail section was completed. About 1.5 miles (2.4 km) of the railroad track was not part of the original sale to Westmoreland county. A portion of this lies at the end of the line in Export, where Dura-Bond maintains its facilities. The other major segment is 0.9 miles (1.4 km) of track at the beginning of the line in Trafford; this portion of track was not owned by Dura-Bond but was retained by Conrail, which handed it down to one of its successors, Norfolk Southern. Westmoreland County has expressed interest in acquiring a portion of this track to extend the rail-trail to the Trafford business district.

== Rolling stock: locomotives and caboose ==
Dura-Bond is reported to have owned and operated four locomotives during the lifetime of its railroad; all of them were diesel-electric switchers. The two smaller locomotives were used only for intra-yard switching. These were a 300-horsepower 44-ton Whitcomb Co. switch engine that the company had owned prior to buying the railroad and a comparable General Electric 50-ton switcher which later took over this 44-toner's duties. To operate the length of the railroad, Dura-Bond needed more powerful locomotives to haul trains of up to 10 fully loaded cars up the steepest section of the track, reported to be a 2 percent gradient section in Murrysville. For this the company used a 600 h.p. 99-ton switch engine known by as its roster number as "TCKR 462" and a heavier switcher known as "TCKR 550". Dura-Bond listed TCKR 550 as a 110-ton 1200 h.p. model in an official filing with the Surface Transportation Board, while the 5th edition of Edward Lewis' American Shortline Railway Guide listed the locomotive as a different 1000 h.p. model. Engine 550 saw "occasional duty" hauling trains up and down the line, while TCKR 462 was "the primary workhorse of the railroad". When the Turtle Creek Industrial Railroad finally ceased operations, Engine 462's days of service did not end; before the tracks were removed this locomotive was relocated westward to Dura-Bond's Duquesne facility.

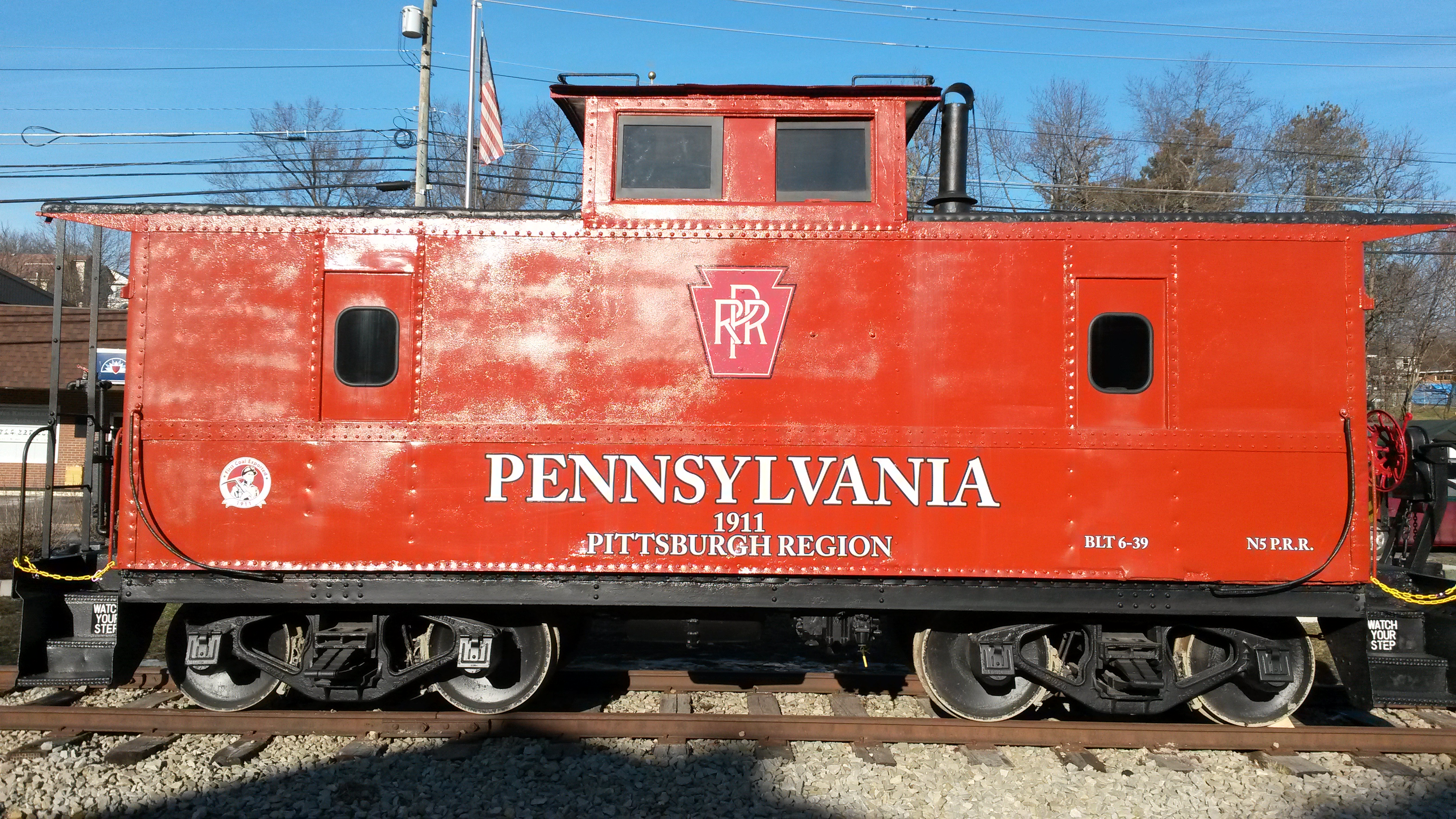
The former TCKR caboose sitting in Export, PA

When Dura-Bond purchased Engine 462 in 1982 it also acquired a cupola caboose, which the seller insisted had to be taken along with the locomotive as part of a two-for-one deal. The company originally discussed using this car to serve as a lookout at the end of its trains. But during the 1980s freight operators in the US were phasing out this traditional role of the caboose, and a documentary video of the Turtle Creek Industrial Railroad produced just after this decade showed many of its freight trains in operation, but none with a caboose in tow. By 1999, the caboose was spending most of its days parked near Old William Penn Highway in Export, serving as "a symbol of days gone by". Dura-Bond maintained the caboose in rail-worthy condition for the special occasions on which it would see use, such as transporting Santa Claus during Export's Christmas celebrations. Once service on the line ended, the caboose was thoroughly restored by Dura-Bond and donated to the Export Historical Society, to remain on display on what remains of the TCKR track in downtown Export, Pennsylvania.

| Vehicle | Road Number | Model | Builder No. | Manufacture Date | Purchase Date | Previous Owner |
| switcher | | Whitcomb 44-ton | | | | |
| switcher | unnumbered | GE 50-ton | 29871 | June 1948 | | |
| switcher | TCKR 462 | EMD SW1 | 7509 | August 1949 | May 1982 | Johnstown and Stony Creek Railroad |
| switcher | TCKR 550 | EMD NW2 or EMD SW7 | 8534 | 1947 or October 1949 | 1985 | Union Railroad |
| caboose | TCKR 9 | | | 1927, 1937 or June 1939 | May 1982 | Johnstown and Stony Creek Railroad |

== Operational Statistics ==
- Total Train Miles
- Employee Hours Worked

Data logged with the Federal Railroad Administration showed that service on the Turtle Creek Industrial Railroad was steady from 1987 through 2008. (Data prior to 1987 are incomplete.) Given that the track distance between Trafford and Export is 10 miles (16 km) in each direction, the total train miles reported per year are consistent with the "three to five trains per week" cited in the 1991 documentary. The drop-off in miles logged as a result of the June 2009 flood is apparent. Regular train service halted in June 2009, and after a three-month pause, a final 64 train miles were recorded in October. Employee work hours continued to be logged each month through July 2010.
