= Westinghouse Interworks Railway =

Railway in Allegheny County, Pennsylvania

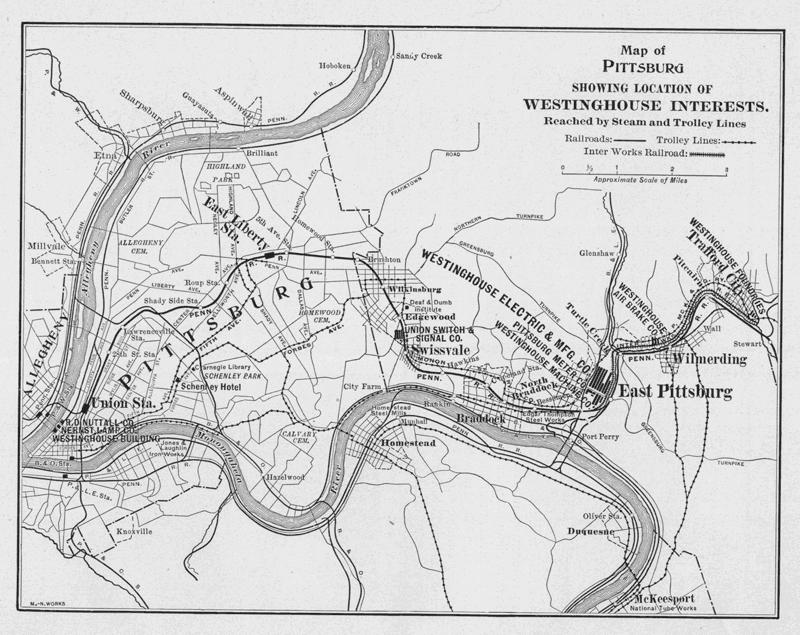

Overview
- Headquarters: Trafford, Pennsylvania
- Locale: Allegheny County, Pennsylvania
- Dates of operation: 1902–1962

Technical
- Track gauge: 4 ft 8 1/2 in (1,435 mm) standard gauge
- Electrification: partial
- Length: 5 miles (8.0 km)

The Westinghouse Interworks Railway was a short line railroad that operated in the lower Turtle Creek valley east of Pittsburgh, Pennsylvania. A subsidiary of the Westinghouse Electric Corporation, the railway used former Turtle Creek Valley Railroad tracks that Westinghouse rebuilt and extended from Trafford through Wilmerding to East Pittsburgh along the right bank (northern side) of the creek. The railroad transported freight between the Westinghouse plants and also tested and demonstrated electric rail cars.

== History of Operations: 1902-1962 ==
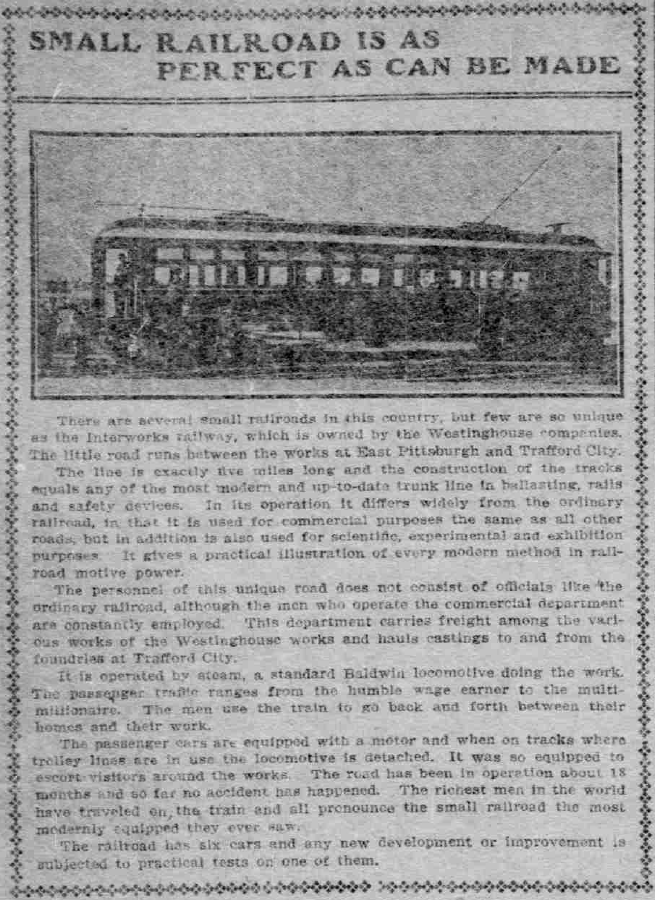
A 1904 promotional article for the Westinghouse Interworks Railway

The Westinghouse Interworks Railway was chartered on February 25, 1902, and on April 8 of the following year the company signed a 25-year lease allowing its trains to operate over a portion of the East Pittsburgh Branch owned by the Pennsylvania Railroad (PRR). J.C. Bair, a civil engineer for the PRR, was assigned as superintendent of the Interworks Railway in June 1903. The Interworks Railway began limited service on August 9, 1903, and became fully operational on December 1, 1904. This company shipped raw materials and finished products between the Westinghouse facilities charging tonnage fees for the freight and hourly fees for the labor. The line shuttled factory workmen to and from their jobs as well.

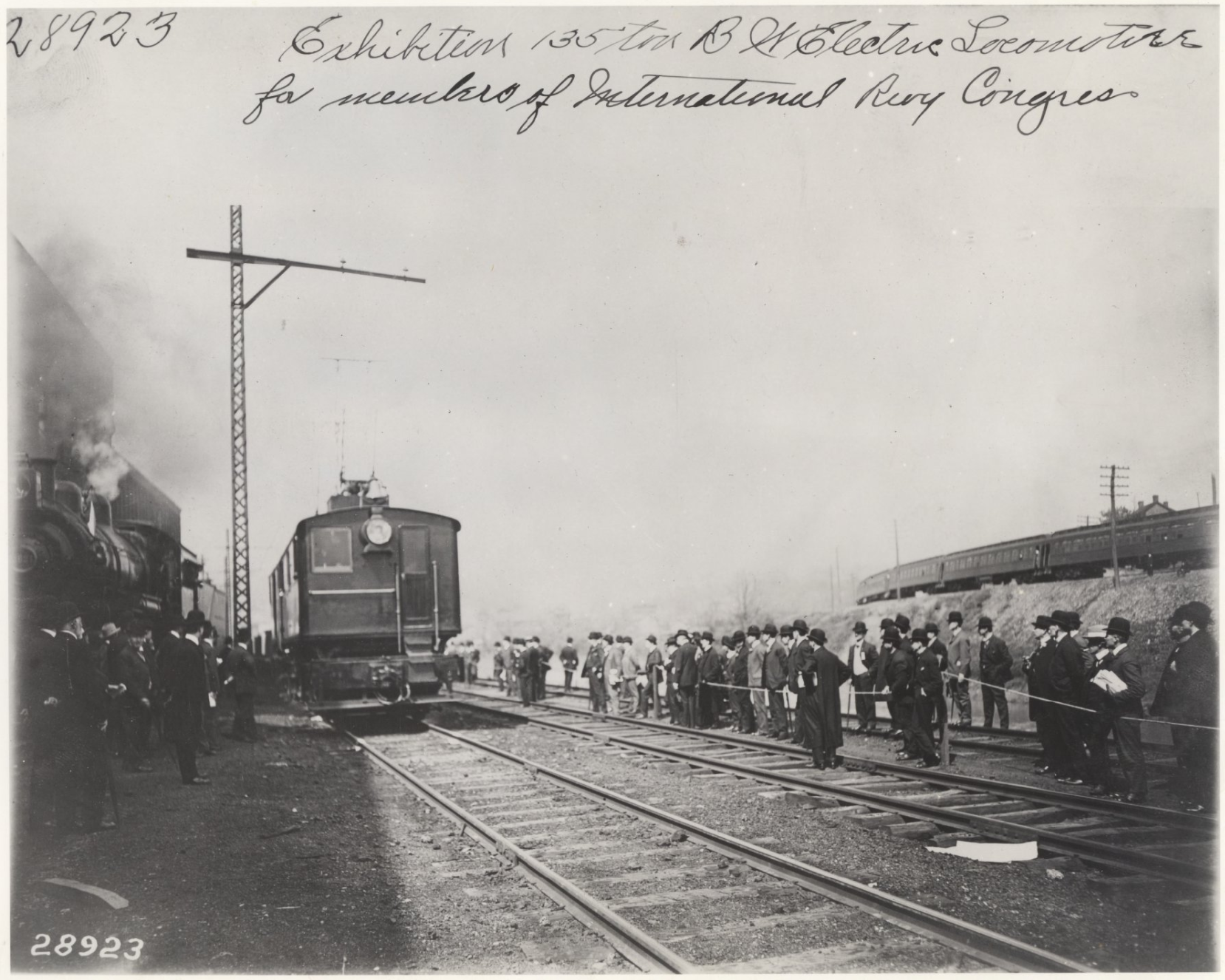
Exhibition of 135 ton Baldwin-Westinghouse electric locomotive to members of the International Railway Congress on May 16, 1905

Ridership on this line was not limited to workmen, and the vehicles that rode the rails were not limited to steam powered freight trains. A portion of the railway was electrified, allowing its use for the testing and promotion of Westinghouse's new electric trains. One such promotional event occurred in 1905, when during an international railway congress the track was used to demonstrate a new 1500 horsepower Baldwin-Westinghouse single-phase alternating-current electric locomotive. This locomotive type was then shipped out of the plant via the railway in 1906.

By 1938 the railway owned over 40 pieces of rolling stock, which it operated along five miles of track between Trafford and East Pittsburgh. Maps indicate that Westinghouse owned only the portions of the track nearest its facilities, with the connecting segments being owned by the Pennsylvania Railroad company. However long-term Interworks Railway superintendent J.C. Bair believed his company compared well to the much larger railroad from which it leased track rights; he was known to often say, “Our tracks may not be as long as the Pennsylvania’s, but they’re just as wide.” (Note: Bair passed away in 1944; he had served as superintendent of the line continuously since its opening in 1903.) A 21st century evaluation also echoed the relative importance of the Westinghouse interworks Railway, opining that it had played a greater role in the creation and growth of the borough of Trafford than did the neighboring Turtle Creek Branch of the Pennsylvania Railroad.

== Post Operational Years : 1962 - present ==
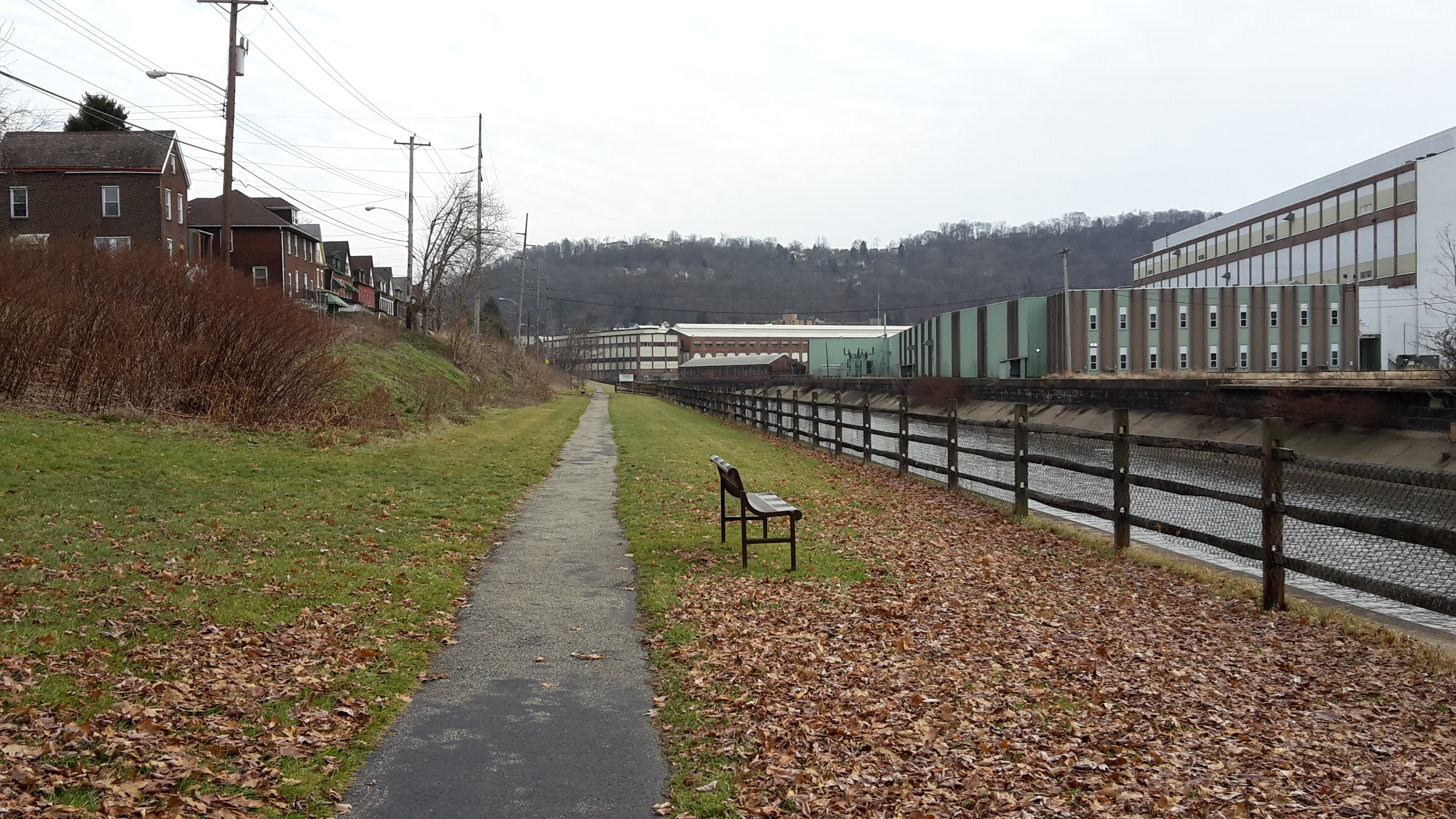
The Airbrake Park Walking Trail follows part of the path of the old Westinghouse Interworks Railway in Wilmerding, Pennsylvania. The buildings of the Westinghouse Air Brake Company can be seen across Turtle Creek.

A large flood control project stretching from the 1950s through the '60s included a change to the banks of the Turtle Creek waterway that required the removal of Interworks tracks between Wilmerding and Pitcairn, and the decision was made not to rebuild them. Thus on September 30, 1962, the rail link on the right bank of Turtle Creek between Trafford and Wilmerding was severed, and nearly all of its track between these two boroughs was eventually removed. Most of this track-bed now lies abandoned, save for a fraction of a mile in Wilmerding which became the Airbrake Avenue Walking Trail. Proposals exist to convert the rest of the abandoned line into a rail-trail as well.

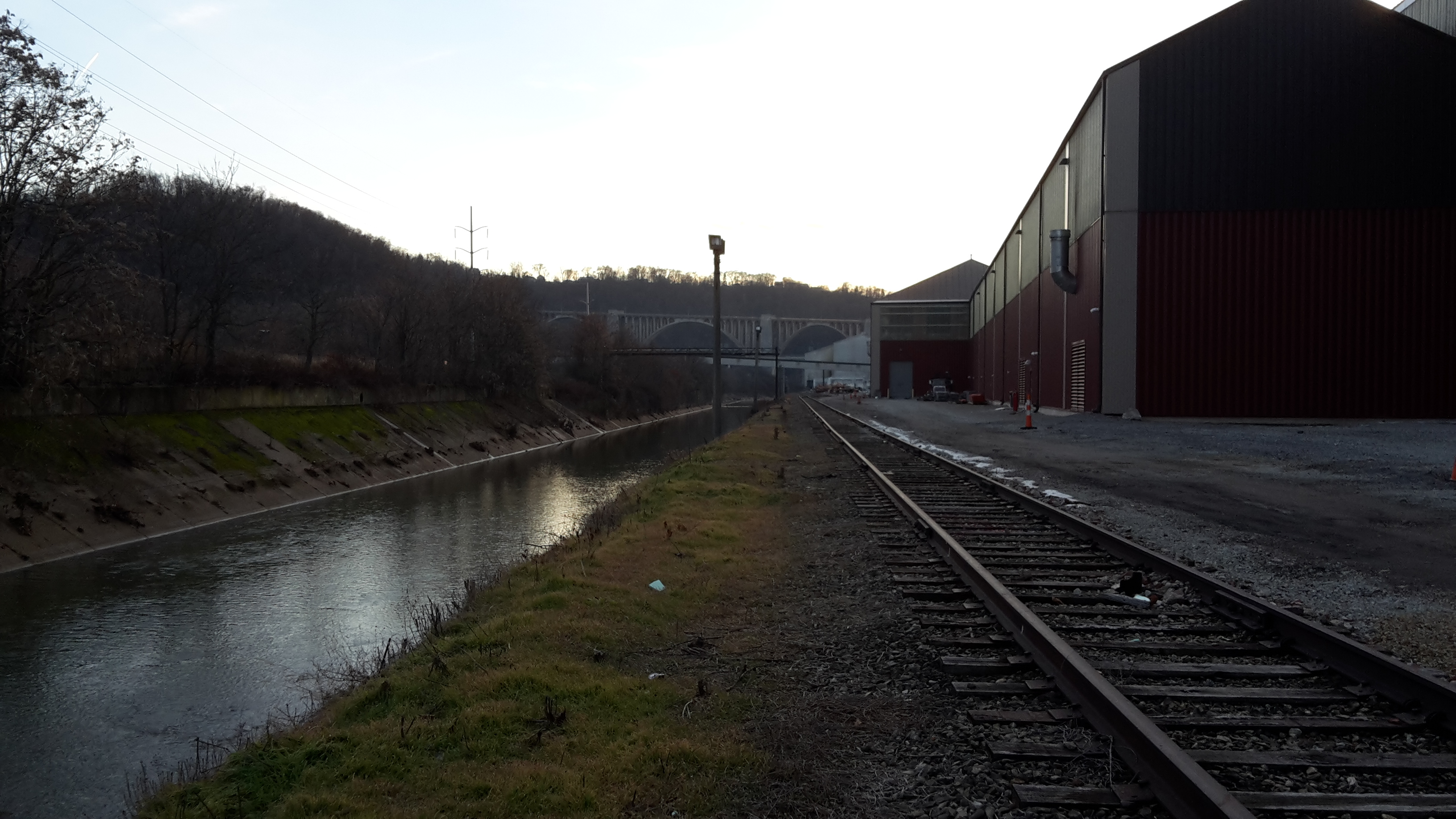
Remnants of the railway lie idle between Turtle Creek and the Keystone Commons in Turtle Creek, PA

The remaining portion of the railroad west of Wilmerding was never formally abandoned, and has been acquired by the Regional Industrial Development Corporation of Southwestern Pennsylvania (RIDC) who also purchased the old Westinghouse Electric plant adjacent to the rail, renaming it, "The Keystone Commons". Since this acquisition some limited rail activity has been observed at the southernmost section of The Commons in East Pittsburgh, where a locomotive from the adjoining Union Railroad has been occasionally spotted pushing deliveries. Farther north in the borough of Turtle Creek the remainder of the tracks appear to have fallen into prolonged disuse, as it was reported that no trains have traveled there since the 1980s.

Controversy over this idle section of track arose in 2014 when Allegheny County replaced the Greensburg Pike bridge, which passed over the remnants of the railway. The rails had to be temporarily removed during part of the bridge constriction; their owner wanted them replaced, and the Pennsylvania Public Utility Commission agreed that the county was obligated to replace them. Local civic leaders as well as neighboring businessmen voiced their objections, questioning the wisdom of using public funds to restore unused track, arguing that the money could have been better spent. The county ultimately spent $365,000 restoring the rails. The 10.114 acres of vacant industrial land on which they lie was assessed at $39,700 in 2017. No specific plans to restore train service on the tracks were reported.
