= Shaler North Hills Library =

Library in United States of America

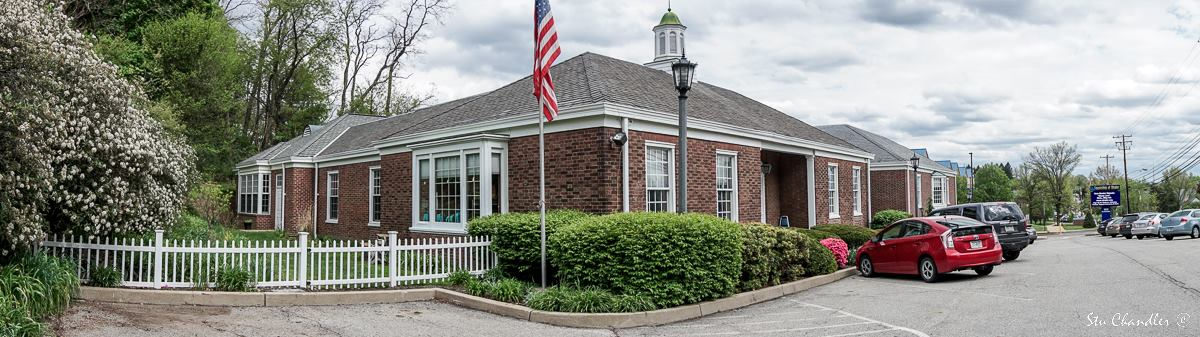
- Shaler North Hills Library, 1822 Mount Royal Boulevard, Glenshaw, PA, USA 15116
- 40°31′41.76″N 79°57′59.26″W
- Location: Shaler Township, Pennsylvania, United States
- Established: 1942

Collection
- Size: 120,137

Access and use
- Circulation: 414,100
- Population served: 28,757

Other information
- Budget: $1,183,479
- Director: Sharon McRae
- Employees: 40; includes 34 Part- and 6 Full-Time; FTE 19.18
- Website: shalerlibrary.org

The Shaler North Hills Library is the public library serving Shaler Township, Pennsylvania, the Shaler Area School District and environs. The library can be found in Glenshaw, Pennsylvania, the central municipality of Shaler Township, located 7.2 miles (11.6 km) north northeast of Pittsburgh. A community and cultural resource since 1942, the Shaler North Hills Library offers a variety of materials and services. Shaler North Hills Library holds over 120,000 titles at its single branch location, including fiction and non-fiction books, DVDs, music CDs, audio books, and magazines, along with online resources. The Library also has access to the materials of all other participating Allegheny County Library Association libraries.

== Special services ==
- The library offers free parking and is located on a bus route serviced by Pittsburgh Regional Transit.
- A book drop is located in the back of the building and is accessible 24-hours a day.
- The library offers free use of all PC computers, which include word processing and other software for public use; free Wi-Fi and Internet access; and access to extensive online databases.
- Patrons gain access to most public library collections in Allegheny County.
- Children's, young adult, and adult educational and recreational programming is offered year-round.
- The library has numerous meeting and study rooms.

== History ==
Glenshaw, Pennsylvania, and its neighboring communities have been served by a local library since the establishment of the Glenshaw Public Library in 1895. As the community grew, plans were made to build a new dedicated library facility owned by the Township. Groundbreaking for the new Shaler Library occurred on December 7, 1941—coincidentally, the day of the attack on Pearl Harbor.

== Awards and recognition ==
- In 2010, the Pennsylvania Library Association awarded Shaler North Hills Library the David J. Roberts EXCEL Library Service Award in recognition of its Discovery Kids program.
- Shaler North Hills Library received the National Medal for Museum and Library Service in 2012. Citing over 50,000 patrons attending library programming annually, the Institute of Museum and Library Services (IMLS), which presents the National Medal, recognized the library's commitment to community outreach and service. According to Susan Hildreth, IMLS Director, “Shaler North Hills Library has a proactive approach to providing community service. Members of the library staff are just as likely to be out in the community working as they are to be within the library building. When they see a need … they try to find a solution.” The award ceremony was attended by Library Director Sharon McRae and U.S. Representative Jason Altmire (D-PA).
- The Pennsylvania Forward Star Libraries Program currently recognizes Shaler North Hills Library as a Bronze Star Library (effective 2018 through 2021).

== Partnerships and funding ==
Primary funding for the library is provided by Shaler Township. Partial funding and other forms of in-kind support and collaboration are provided by the following partner agencies.

- Allegheny Regional Asset District
- Commonwealth of Pennsylvania/Commonwealth Libraries
- The Friends of the Shaler North Hills Library
- The Shaler Garden Club
- The Kiwanis Club of Glenshaw
- Shaler Area School District (SASD) and area schools
- Shaler Area Rotary
- Western Pennsylvania Humane Society
- Allegheny County Library Association (ACLA)
- The eiNetwork
- The Carnegie Library of Pittsburgh
- The Pittsburgh Foundation
- The Carnegie Museum of Natural History
- The Kearns Spirituality Center
- The Pennsylvania Library Association
