= HSWP =

HSWP may refer to:

- Hungarian Socialist Workers' Party
- Historical Society of Western Pennsylvania
