= Montae Nicholson =

American football player (born 1995)

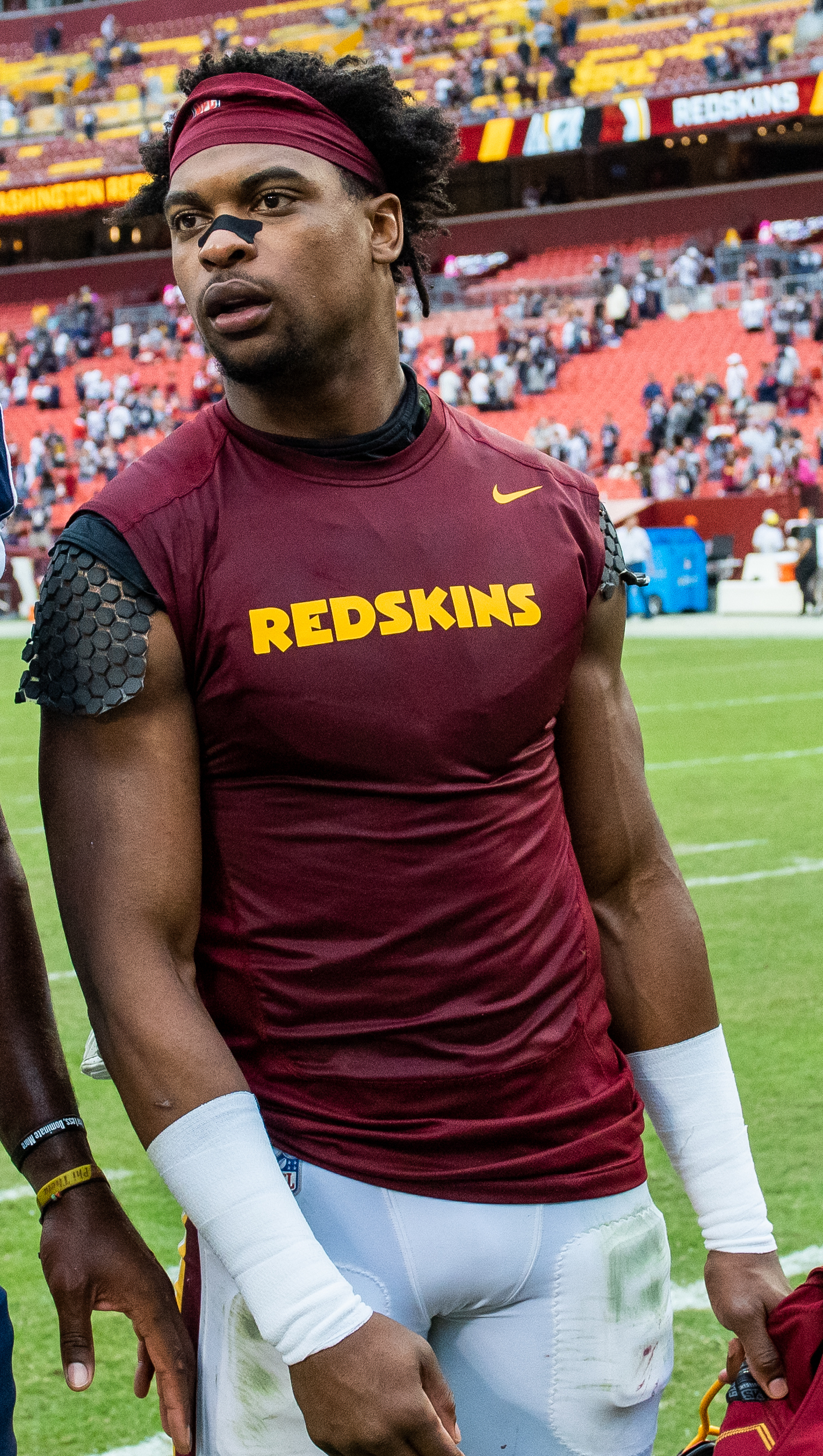
- Nicholson with the Washington Redskins in 2019

Profile
- Position: Safety

Personal information
- Born: December 4, 1995 (age 30); Columbus, Ohio, U.S.
- Listed height: 6 ft 2 in (1.88 m)
- Listed weight: 212 lb (96 kg)

Career information
- High school: Monroeville (PA) Gateway
- College: Michigan State (2014–2016)
- NFL draft: 2017: 4th round, 123rd overall pick

Career history
- Washington Redskins (2017–2019); DC Defenders (2023–2025)

Awards and highlights
- UFL champion (2025)

Career NFL statistics
- Total tackles: 127
- Fumble recoveries: 2
- Pass deflections: 7
- Interceptions: 3
- Stats at Pro Football Reference

Montae Nicholson (born December 4, 1995) is an American professional football safety. He played college football at Michigan State and was selected by the Washington Redskins in the fourth round of the 2017 NFL draft.

== Early life ==
Nicholson attended Gateway High School in Monroeville, Pennsylvania, where he starred in football, basketball and track and field. His senior year, Nicholson won PIAA gold medals in the 110 hurdles and 400-meter relay along with the state's 60-meter indoor hurdles title. He was named the Pittsburgh Tribune-Review Male Athlete of the Year.

Regarded as a four-star recruit by Rivals.com, Nicholson was ranked as the No. 13 safety prospect in the class of 2014. He chose Michigan State over offers from Florida State, Ohio State, Oregon, Penn State, Pittsburgh, and Virginia Tech, among others.

== College career ==
Nicholson played safety for Michigan State from 2014-2016. A three-year letterman, Nicholson played in 38 games with 23 starts, recording 200 tackles, 4 interceptions, 4 pass deflections, 3 fumble recoveries and 1 forced fumble. As a junior in 2016, he played in 11 games, starting 10 and being voted honorable mention All-Big Ten at safety.

== Professional career ==
External videos
- Redskins select Nicholson 123rd overall

Pre-draft measurables
Height	Weight	Arm length	Hand span	40-yard dash	Vertical jump	Broad jump
6 ft 2 3/8 in (1.89 m)	212 lb (96 kg)	33 3/8 in (0.85 m)	9 1/2 in (0.24 m)	4.42 s	35.0 in (0.89 m)	10 ft 5 in (3.18 m)
All values from NFL Combine

=== Washington Redskins ===
==== 2017 ====
The Washington Redskins selected Nicholson in the fourth round (123rd overall) of the 2017 NFL draft. On May 11, 2017, Nicholson signed a four-year, US$3 million contract.

Throughout training camp, he competed for the job as a backup safety against Will Blackmon, Deshazor Everett, Earl Wolff, Josh Evans, Stefan McClure, and Fish Smithson. Head coach Jay Gruden named him the backup strong safety, behind Deshazor Everett, to begin the regular season after the original starting strong safety, Su'a Cravens, announced his decision to retire a week before their season-opener.

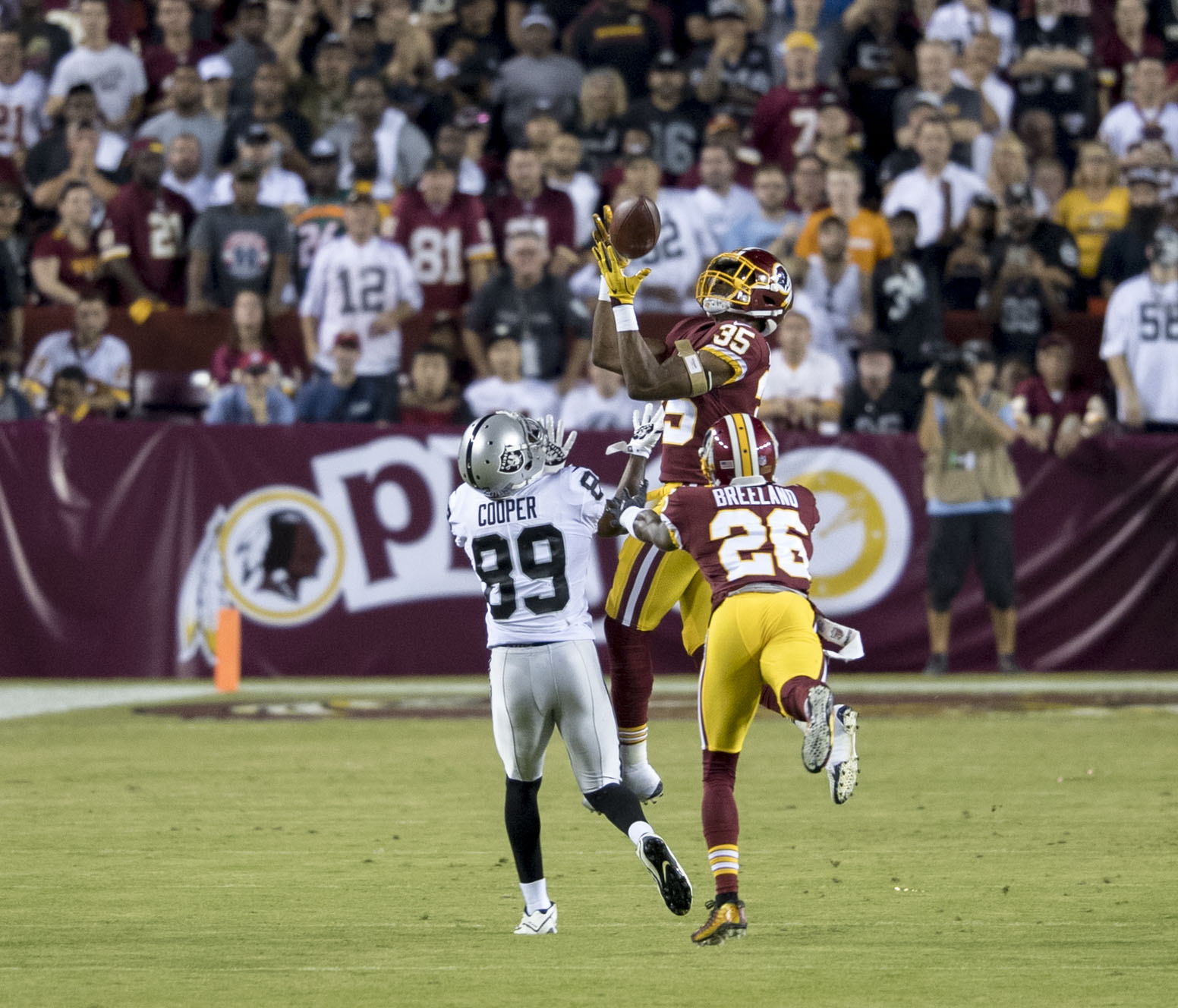
Nicholson intercepts a pass meant for Oakland Raiders wide receiver Amari Cooper in 2017.

He made his professional regular season debut in the Redskins' season-opening 30–17 loss to the Philadelphia Eagles. On September 17, 2017, Nicholson earned his first career start and made two solo tackles in the Redskins' 27–20 victory at the Los Angeles Rams in Week 2. Defensive coordinator Greg Manusky opted to use Nicholson in nickel packages and Everett in base formations. In Week 3, Nicholson recorded a solo tackle, a pass deflection, and made his first career interception off a pass by Derek Carr during a 27–10 victory against the Oakland Raiders. On October 15, 2017, he recorded a season-high six combined tackles and broke up a pass, but left in the second quarter of the Redskins' 26–24 win against the San Francisco 49er after sustaining a concussion. His concussion occurred in the last 45 seconds of the half after Nicholson attempted to tackle wide receiver Pierre Garcon, but lowered shoulder and took a blow directly to his head that knocked off his helmet and rendered him unconscious. His concussion sidelined him for the next two games (Weeks 9–10). On November 18, 2017, he made four solo tackles before leaving in the third quarter of the Redskins' 20–10 victory against the New York Giants after receiving another concussion. On December 19, 2017, Nicholson was placed on injured reserve. He finished his rookie season with 24 combined tackles (18 solo), two pass deflections, and an interception in eight games and six starts.

==== 2018 ====
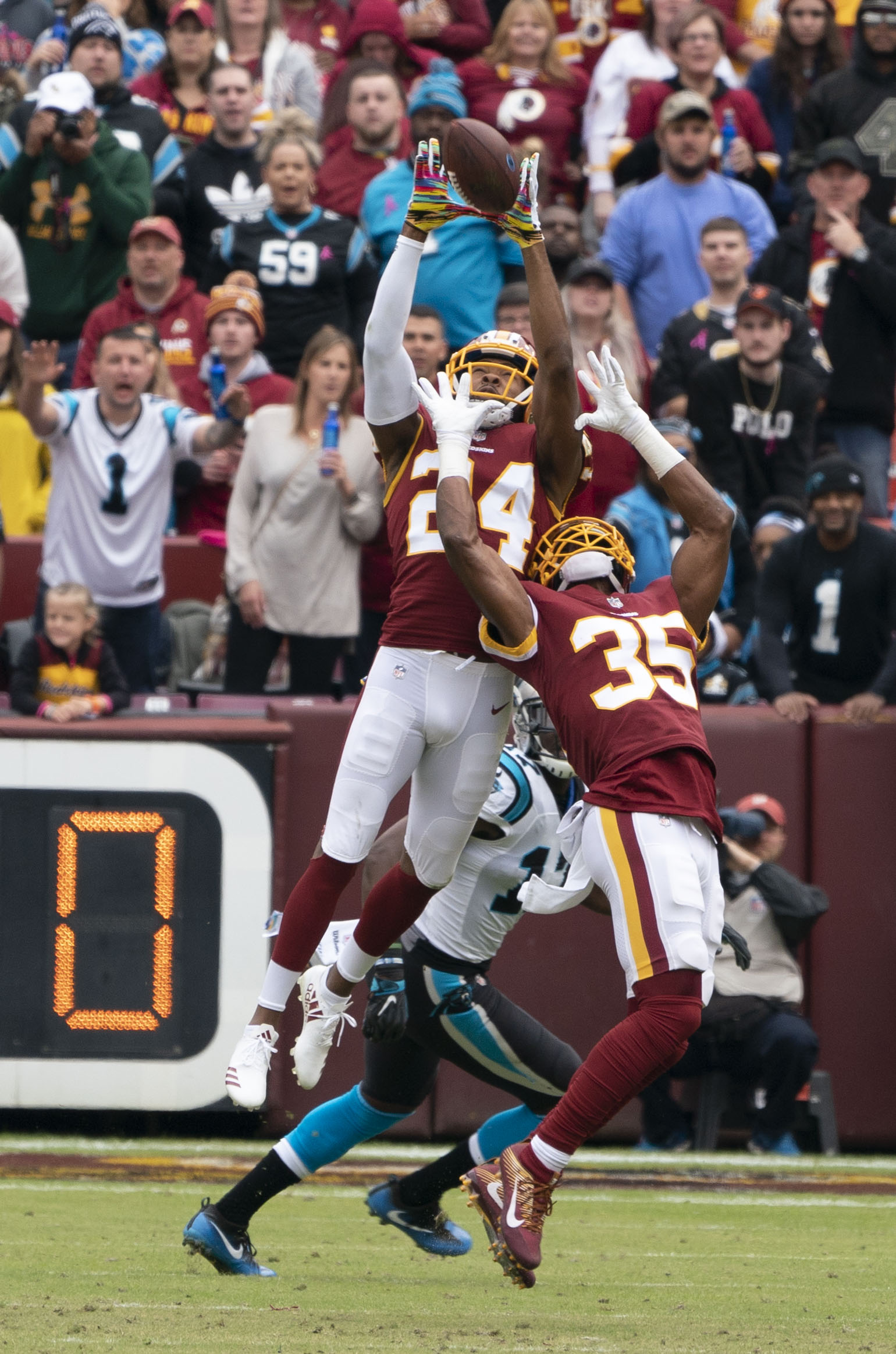
Nicholson (#35) playing against the Carolina Panthers in 2018.

Nicholson entered the 2018 season as the Redskins starting free safety alongside strong safety D. J. Swearinger. He started the first seven games before losing the starting job in Week 9 after the Redskins traded for Ha-Ha Clinton-Dix. He was placed on the reserve/NFI list on December 19, 2018, following an assault and battery arrest.

==== 2019 ====
In week 2 against the Dallas Cowboys, Nicholson recorded his first interception of the season off Dak Prescott and returned it 23 yards as the Redskins lost 31–21. In week 5 against the New England Patriots, Nicholson intercepted Tom Brady once in the 33–7 loss. He was placed on injured reserve on December 27, 2019. He finished the season with 62 tackles, four passes defensed, and two interceptions through 13 starts. He was waived on March 23, 2020, with a failed physical designation.

=== DC Defenders ===
Nicholson signed with the DC Defenders of the XFL on March 8, 2023. He was placed on the team's reserve list on April 18, and activated on May 16. He re-signed with the team on January 30, 2024, and again on October 4. He was placed on injured reserve on April 4, 2025, and activated on May 12. He was placed on injured reserve again on May 14.

== Personal life ==
On December 18, 2018, Nicholson was arrested and charged with public swearing, intoxication, and misdemeanor assault in Ashburn, Virginia. The charges were dropped in May 2019. On November 14, 2019, it was reported that the Loudoun County Sheriff's Office was investigating Nicholson regarding the death of 21 year-old Julia Crabbe. On the night of Crabbe's death, Nicholson and another man were identified as the ones who drove Crabbe to a hospital. Crabbe's cause of death was linked to drug overdose, with Nicholson not being officially charged.
