= Gateway High School (Pennsylvania) =

Coordinates: 40.432°N 79.755°W

- Map of Allegheny County, Pennsylvania School Districts
- 3000 Gateway Campus Boulevard, Monroeville, PA 15146

Information
- School district: Gateway School District
- NCES School ID: 421062000170
- Principal: Justin Stephans
- Grades: 9–12
- Enrollment: 1,152 (2024-2025)
- Colors: Black and gold
- Athletics conference: Western Pennsylvania Interscholastic Athletic League, Pennsylvania Interscholastic Athletic Association
- Mascot: The Gateway Gator
- Website: https://www.gatewayk12.org/ghs/index

Gateway High School (GHS) serves the residents of Monroeville and Pitcairn, Pennsylvania. It is part of the Gateway School District and serves grades 9 through 12.

== History ==
Gateway High School was built in 1958 and dedicated on November 15, 1959.

== Athletics ==
Gateway High School is a member of the Pennsylvania Interscholastic Athletic Association (PIAA) and the Western Pennsylvania Interscholastic Athletic League (WPIAL), District 7. The mascot of the school district is the Gateway Gator, a stylized alligator.

== Notable alumni ==
- Sam Adonis - Professional wrestler
- Curtis Bray (Class of 1987) - College football coach
- Jaquan Brisker (Class of 2017) - NFL Player
- Bob Buczkowski (Class of 1982) - NFL player
- Darienne Driver (Class of 1996) - School superintendent
- Paul Graham (Class of 1982) - Computer scientist, entrepreneur, author, and investor
- Corey Graves - Former professional wrestler, current color commentator for WWE NXT
- Courtney Jackson (Class of 2019) - NFL wide receiver for the Seattle Seahawks
- Kathy Keller (Class of 1968) - Author and church founder
- Don Roy King (Class of 1965) - Television director
- Marilyn Suzanne Miller (Class of 1967) - Television writer and producer
- Montae Nicholson (Class of 2014) - NFL player
