= Jefferson Hills Public Library =

Public library serving Allegheny County, Pennsylvania

Coordinates: 40.29744°N 79.92877°W

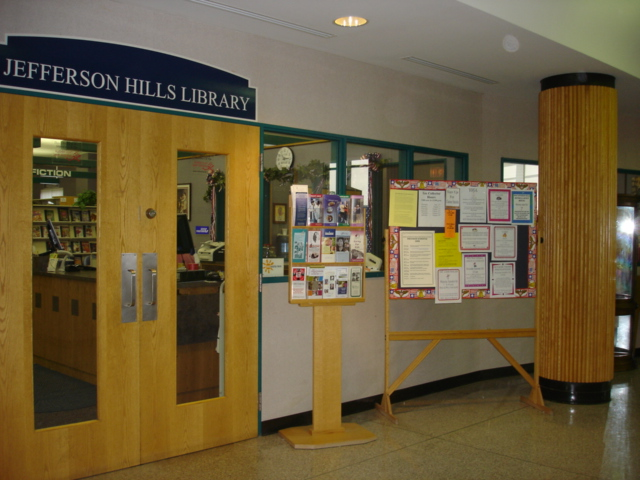
- Location: Jefferson Hills, Pennsylvania
- Established: 1959

Other information
- Website: Jefferson Hills Public Library

The Jefferson Hills Public Library is a public library serving Allegheny County, Pennsylvania. The library is located in Jefferson Hills, Pennsylvania, formed in 1959 to promote reading, thinking, learning, enjoyment of the arts, and to enhance the quality of life for all members of the community.

== History ==
Jefferson Hills Library (originally named Jefferson Borough Library) was founded in 1959 by the joint efforts of the Jefferson Borough Lions' Club and a group of private citizens.

In October 1992, the library moved into the newly erected Municipal Center at 925 Old Clairton Road. Today under the leadership and direction of an appointed Library Board and Library Director, the library is growing rapidly into the 21st century.

The library is now open 50 hours per week. With the addition of computers connected to the World Wide Web and WiFi, as well as a collection of approximately 41,000 books, audio tapes, DVD's and file materials, the library is entering yet another exciting time in its development. In total, the library offers access to over 50,000 electronic resources (44,322 electronic books, 11,460 downloadable audios, and 2,126 downloadable videos.

The library sponsors programs for all ages ... storytimes, exercise classes, how-to and informational classes ... as well as special events such as light up night.

== See also ==
- Pennsylvania Library Association
- Allegheny County Library Association
- Carnegie Library of Pittsburgh
