= Curtis Bray =

American football player and coach (1970–2014)

Biographical details
- Born: May 9, 1970; Monroeville, Pennsylvania, US
- Died: January 15, 2014 (aged 43); Ames, Iowa, US
- Education: University of Pittsburgh

Playing career
- 1988–1991: Pittsburgh
- Position: Linebacker

Coaching career (HC unless noted)
- 1993–1994: Duquesne (DC/LB/ST)
- 1995–1996: Western Kentucky (DL)
- 1997–1999: Villanova (DE)
- 2000–2002: Pittsburgh (DE)
- 2003–2006: Pittsburgh (LB)
- 2007–2008: Temple (LB)
- 2009–2013: Iowa State (DE)

Curtis Sidney Bray (May 9, 1970 – January 15, 2014) was an American football coach. He was a coach for Duquesne University, Western Kentucky University, Villanova University, the University of Pittsburgh, Temple University and Iowa State University.

== Early years ==
Bray attended Gateway High School in Monroeville, Pennsylvania, where he was a star athlete in football, basketball, and track. Bray followed in the foot steps of his father and uncles who played professionally with teams including the Cleveland Browns, Washington Redskins, Toronto Argonauts, Memphis Southmen, and the N.Y. Giants. He was a starter in football from his freshman year of high school and contributed to record 33 victories of the 1984–1986 season teams. Bray was the first athlete in Gateway history to acquire 12 letters in his 4 years at Gateway. Further Bray led the Gators basketball team to the WPIAL playoffs and also State Playoffs in three seasons and won the state championship for javelin in his senior year. Bray was an academic All-American and received the Monroeville Citizen of the Year award. In 1987, he became the first defensive player to win the Gatorade National High School Football Player of the Year Award.

== College career ==
Bray was recruited nationally by top universities including Pitt, Notre Dame, Michigan, Oklahoma, and Penn State and demonstrated academic prowess by being accepted by Ivy League schools including Yale, Harvard and the Univ. of Pennsylvania. Bray ultimately stayed close to home and played linebacker at the University of Pittsburgh starting his first game of his freshman year. During his career he had 170 tackles, despite battling through numerous injuries during his junior and senior season.

== Death ==
On the morning of January 15, 2014, Bray collapsed while going to a meeting due to a pulmonary embolism and later died.
