= Monroeville Public Library =

Pennsylvania public library

- 40.42903°N 79.75478°W
- Location: Monroeville, Pennsylvania, United States
- Established: 1964

Other information
- Website: Monroeville Public Library

Monroeville Public Library is a public library system located in Monroeville, Pennsylvania. It opened on November 3, 1964, as part of Gateway Campus directly opposite the administration building of the Gateway School District and three schools: Gateway High School, Moss Side Middle School, and Dr. Cleveland Stewart Jr. Elementary School. The library has undergone numerous renovations and additions.

== History ==
In 1960, Maude Helen Malick organized the Monroeville Citizens Committee for Library Service which pushed an agenda to erect a library in Monroeville. Having raised funds of $109,000 from the community and a federal grant of $21,000, they were able to build the library on a plot of land opposite the, then, new Gateway high School. Construction of the two-story facility ended in October 1964, and its doors opened on November 3, 1964, with over 7,000 books. By, November 1965, the library had over 13,500 items in the catalog. In 1975, the library underwent a major renovation, adding space to the main lobby, main desk, and space for adult materials including audio.

The library is a member of the Allegheny County Library Association, which promotes collaboration between libraries in Allegheny County.
