= YCL =

YCL may refer to:

- All-Union Leninist Young Communist League, the youth wing of the Communist Party of the Soviet Union
- YCL, the IATA code for Charlo Airport in Charlo, New Brunswick, Canada
- York County Libraries, a public library system in York County, Pennsylvania, United States
- Young Calvinist League, a youth ministry in Canada and the United States
- Young Communist League, list of various organisations, some with variant names
  - Young Communist League, the youth wing of the historical Communist Party of Australia (1920–1991)
  - Young Communist League (Great Britain) the youth wing of the Communist Party of Britain
  - Young Communist League of Canada the youth wing of the Communist Party of Canada
  - Young Communist League, Nepal is the youth wing of the Communist Party of Nepal (Maoist)
  - Young Communist League, USA the youth wing of the Communist Party USA
