= Bob Buczkowski =

American football player (1964–2018)

No. 95, 94
- Position: Defensive end

Personal information
- Born: May 5, 1964; Pittsburgh, Pennsylvania, U.S.
- Died: May 23, 2018 (aged 54); Monroeville, Pennsylvania, U.S.
- Listed height: 6 ft 5 in (1.96 m)
- Listed weight: 260 lb (118 kg)

Career information
- High school: Gateway (Monroeville, Pennsylvania)
- College: Pittsburgh
- NFL draft: 1986: 1st round, 24th overall pick

Career history
- Los Angeles Raiders (1987); San Diego Chargers (1989)*; Phoenix Cardinals (1989); Cleveland Browns (1990); Seattle Seahawks (1991)*
- * Offseason or practice squad member only

Career NFL statistics
- Sacks: 1.5
- Fumble recoveries: 1
- Stats at Pro Football Reference

John Robert Buczkowski (May 5, 1964 – May 23, 2018) was an American professional football player who was a defensive end in the National Football League (NFL) for the Los Angeles Raiders in 1986 and 1987, as well as the Phoenix Cardinals and the Cleveland Browns. He was selected by the Raiders in the first round of the 1986 NFL draft with the 24th overall pick. He played college football for the University of Pittsburgh. He attended Gateway Senior High School in Monroeville, Pennsylvania.

== Legal Battles ==
In 2005 Buczkowski and his 29-year-old girlfriend Amy Schifano were charged with running a prostitution ring out of his parents basement. From 2003 to 2005 the business called Buckwild Entertainment generated about $1 million in revenue.

In 2007 he pleaded guilty to two counts of promoting prostitution and six counts of possessing and dealing cocaine. He was sentenced to 90 days house arrest and three years probation.

== Health and death ==
Later in his life Buczkowski suffered from several illnesses. In 2014 he was diagnosed with leukemia and he also suffered from type-2 diabetes and COPD. Buczkowski had to undergo several surgeries on his back, shoulders, feet and knees. In his last years he began experiencing severe memory loss.

On 23 May 2018 he was found dead in his Monroeville, PA, home by his son. The cause of death was reported as an accidental drug overdose. After his death he donated his brain to the Boston University CTE Center for research.
