= Marilyn Suzanne Miller =

American television writer and producer

- Born: January 3, 1950 (age 76)
- Education: University of Michigan (B.A. 1972)
- Occupations: Television writer, producer
- Writing career
- Notable work: Saturday Night Live
- Notable awards: Three Emmy Awards

Marilyn Suzanne Miller (born January 3, 1950) is an American television writer and producer. She was one of only three female writers on the original staff of Saturday Night Live and was also a writer for such 1970s sitcoms as The Odd Couple, The Mary Tyler Moore Show, Rhoda, Maude, and Barney Miller.

== Early life ==
Miller was born in Neptune, New Jersey, the oldest of four daughters to Dr. Norman R. Miller, a psychologist, and Shirley M. Miller, a writer and editor. Her family moved to Monroeville, Pennsylvania near Pittsburgh, where she attended Gateway High School, graduating in 1967.

As an undergraduate at the University of Michigan, she pursued a degree in playwriting, graduating in 1972. She was accepted into the University of Iowa's writer's workshop, but she deferred enrollment in the Master of Fine Arts program there for financial reasons.

== Television ==
After college, Miller worked as a fashion copy writer for a Pittsburgh department store. During that time she wrote the draft of a script for The Mary Tyler Moore Show, and cold-called executive producer James L. Brooks at CBS to pitch the script. Soon after sending Brooks the script, she was flown to Hollywood by Garry Marshall to be a junior writer for The Odd Couple. For Brooks, she wrote for The Mary Tyler Moore Show and the spinoff Rhoda. She also went on to write for Maude, Barney Miller, and Welcome Back, Kotter.

For her work on the 1974 Lily Tomlin special, Lily, Miller earned an Emmy Award nomination for Outstanding Writing in a Comedy, Variety or Music Special. One of the special's producers, Lorne Michaels, was assembling the writing staff for Saturday Night Live, and he asked Miller to join. Though she at first declined, she was convinced to join the show's original writing staff at the age of 25. She was one of only three women on the staff, along with Anne Beatts and Rosie Shuster, however, Miller did not join the staff until the Lily Tomlin-hosted episode, as it was suggested to her by Michaels, since she had previously worked on the aforementioned Lily special.

On SNL, Miller's writing appeared in the "Judy Miller" and "Rhonda Weiss" recurring sketches, both for Gilda Radner. She collaborated with Steve Martin and Dan Aykroyd on the "Festrunk Brothers" ("Wild and Crazy Guys") sketches. She also wrote the classic "Dancing in the Dark" sketch for Radner and Martin in 1978. For her work on SNL she won two Emmys and received three other nominations, as well as winning several Writers Guild of America Awards.

Miller left the SNL staff in 1978 to work on Radner's one-woman Broadway revue and movie, Gilda Live. After more theatrical work, including briefly returning to SNL for most of the 1981-82 season, when Dick Ebersol had taken over as producer of the show, and Eddie Murphy was the star of the show back then; Miller returned to weekly television as a producer on The Tracey Ullman Show, for which she won another Emmy for Outstanding Writing in a Variety or Music Program in 1990. In 1991, she was the co-executive producer of the briefly revived The Carol Burnett Show.

Miller was diagnosed with advanced breast cancer in 1992. She returned to the writing staff of SNL later that year, although she was not credited as a writer until the March 13, 1993 episode of season 18, by which point, Michaels had been back producing the show for several years by then. She has since talked about working with younger cast members such as Adam Sandler and Mike Myers, and younger writers like Dave Mandel and Steve Koren. After seven non-consecutive seasons, Miller permanently exited the show at the end of the show's infamous 20th season in 1995, alongside most of the writing staff and cast.

In 1998, she wrote an episode about breast cancer for Murphy Brown, winning a Humanitas Prize. In 2001, she won her third Writers Guild Award for SNL's 25th anniversary show, Saturday Night Live 25.

== Book ==
Miller is the author of How to Be a Middle-Aged Babe (published in 2007), "a bawdy, smart satire of earnest women's magazines and self-help books".
