= York County Libraries =

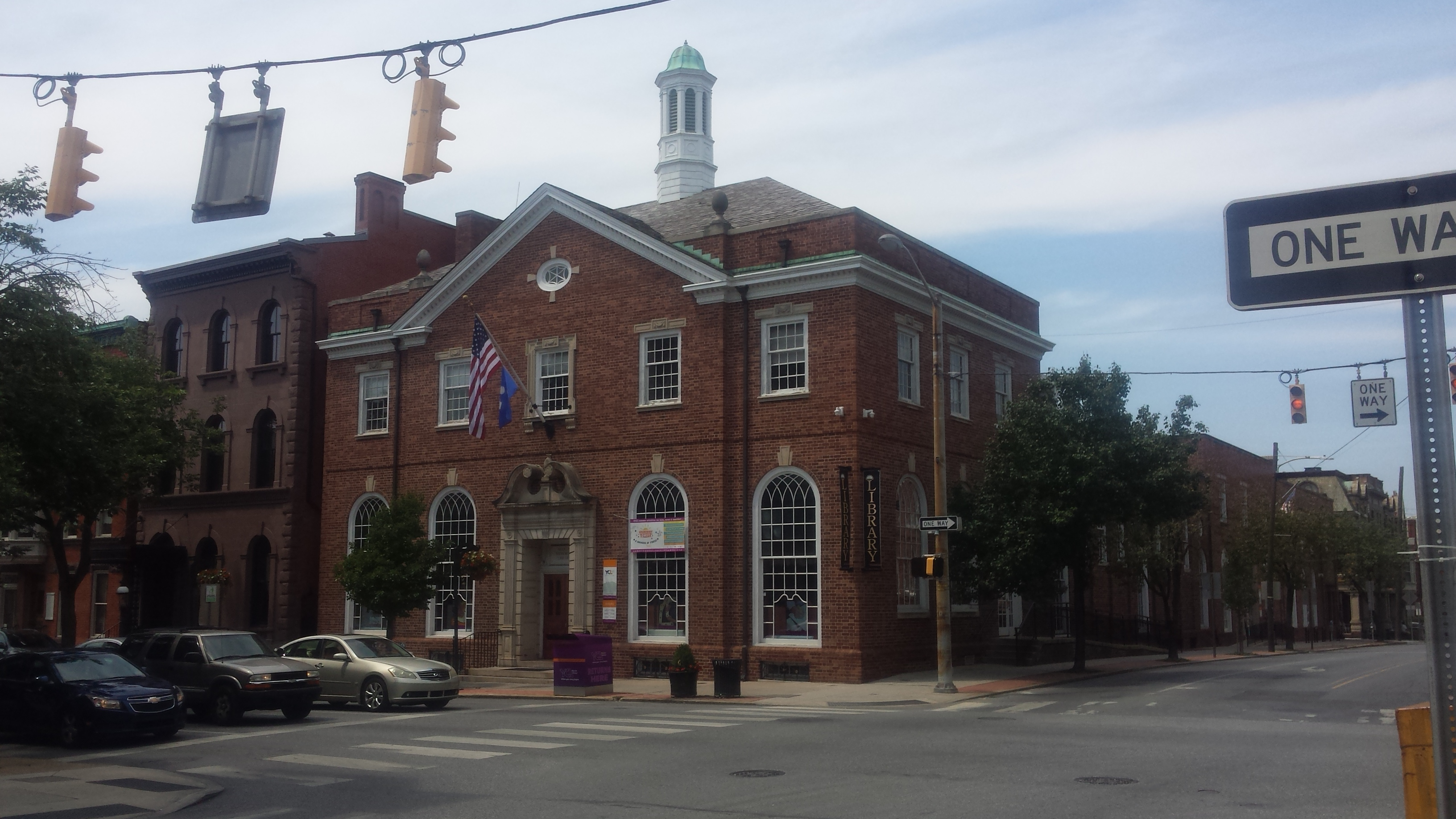
- Martin Library, the district center.
- Location: York County, Pennsylvania
- Established: 1974
- Branches: 13

Collection
- Size: 600,000

Access and use
- Circulation: 1.6 million (2016)
- Population served: 434,972 (2010)
- Members: 245,000 (2019)

Other information
- Director: Robert Lambert
- Employees: 35
- Website: www.yorklibraries.org

York County Libraries (YCL) is a library system located in York County, Pennsylvania. It is a member of the Pennsylvania Library Association, the state's professional association for librarians. The library system consists of 13 full-service libraries, one neighborhood library, and 2 additional pick-up and drop-off locations in the county.

YCL offers programming for children, teens, adults, and seniors, and provides over 600,000 print and digital items for loan and use. The libraries use an interlibrary loan system between all 13 locations, and allows for loan requests from other counties and areas. Those with a valid library card to York Country Libraries are able to reserve materials online and pick them up in their local library. Books may likewise be returned at any library in the system.

== History ==
The York County library system first came into existence on February 13, 1974 when York County commissioners passed legislation allowing for the federation of the area's libraries. The impetus for its creation was the 1964 Library Services and Construction Act which appropriated money "to promote the further development of public library services." Since the independent libraries in York County were now considered to be a county system, the county would be qualified to receive state funding. From this act, the county received a grant of $50,000 for the development of the libraries.

In 2018, the Pennsylvania Library Association awarded Paula Gilbert of the York County Libraries their Distinguished Service Award. That same year the Martin Library won Library of the Year.

In 2019, the library system underwent a $10 million renovation campaign, funded in part through state grants and private donations. The purpose of the renovation was to upgrade the Martin, Kreutz Creek, and Kaltreider-Benfer libraries to include more community spaces, technology, and overall space. This campaign came after an initial $1 million state grant through Pennsylvania's 2018 Redevelopment Assistance Capital Program.

== Library Locations ==
Name	Address
Arthur Hufnagel Public Library of Glen Rock	32 Main St, Glen Rock, PA 17327
Collinsville Community Library	2632 Delta Rd, Brogue, PA 17309
Dillsburg Area Public Library	204 Mumper Ln, Dillsburg, PA 17019
Dover Area Community Library	3700-3 Davidsburg Rd, Dover, PA 17315
Glatfelter Memorial Library	101 Glenview Rd, Spring Grove, PA 17362
Guthrie Memorial Library	2 Library Pl, Hanover, PA 17331
Kaltreider-Benfer Library	147 S Charles St, Red Lion, PA 17356
Kreutz Creek Library	66 Walnut Springs Rd, York, PA 17406
Martin Library	159 E Market St, York, PA 17401
Mason-Dixon Public Library	250 Bailey Dr, Stewartstown, PA 17363
Paul Smith Library of Southern York County	80 Constitution Ave, Shrewsbury, PA 17361
Red Land Community Library	70 Newberry Commons, Goldsboro, PA 17319
Salem Square Library	596 W Princess St, York, PA 17401
Village Library	35 N Main St #C, Jacobus, PA 17407
