= Gateway School District =

School district in Pennsylvania, United States

Address
- 9000 Gateway Campus Blvd Monroeville, Allegheny County, Pennsylvania, 15146-3378; United States

District information
- Type: Public school district
- Grades: K-12
- Established: 1958

Students and staff
- Colors: Black & Vegas Gold

Other information
- Website: www.gatewayk12.org

The Gateway School District is a large, suburban, public school district located in Monroeville, Pennsylvania. It also serves residents of Pitcairn. Gateway School District encompasses approximately 19 square miles (49 km^{2}). Per the 2000 federal census data, the Gateway School District serves a resident population of 33,038. By 2010, the district's population was 31,686 people. In 2009, the District residents' per capita income was $22,998, while the median family income was $51,250. In the Commonwealth, the median family income was $49,501 and the United States median family income was $49,445, in 2010. By 2013, the median household income in the United States rose to $52,100.

== Schools ==
All students in the district attend Gateway High School for 9th grade to 12th grade. Depending on the location of their home, students in kindergarten through grade four attend either: Evergreen Elementary School, Dr. Cleveland Steward, Jr. Elementary School, Ramsey Elementary School, or University Park Elementary School.

- Evergreen Elementary School - 3831 Evergreen Drive, Monroeville, PA 15146.
- Dr. Cleveland Steward, Jr. Elementary School- 5000 Gateway Campus Boulevard, Monroeville, PA 15146.
- Ramsey Elementary School - 2200 Ramsey Road, Monroeville, PA 15146.
- University Park Elementary School - 320 Noel Drive, Monroeville, PA 15146.
- Moss Side Middle School - Grades 5, 6, 7 & 8 (for 2021-2022 - 2023-2024 school year), 9000 Gateway Campus Boulevard, Monroeville, PA 15146.
- Gateway Middle School - Grades 5, 6, 7 & 8, for (2024 & 2025 school year and beyond) 4450 Old William Penn Highway, Monroeville, PA 15146.
- Gateway High School - 3000 Gateway Campus Boulevard, Monroeville, PA 15146

== Extracurriculars ==
The district offers a variety of clubs, activities and sports.

=== Athletics ===
The mascot of the school district is the Gateway Gator, a stylized alligator.

==== Gateway Middle School ====
Beginning in 7th grade, at Gateway Middle School, Gateway School District offers competitive play in several sports while representing the district and their specific school. While athletics conducted by the middle school are not WPIAL/PIAA recognized and therefore do not offer playoffs/championships, they do serve as the first introduction to competition on an interscholastic basis for many student-athletes, preparing them for high school competition where much more may be expected of them.

==== Gateway High School ====
Gateway High School is recognized as a member of the Pennsylvania Interscholastic Athletic Association (P.I.A.A.) on the state level. Within the PIAA, Gateway competes in the Western Pennsylvania Interscholastic Athletic League (W.P.I.A.L.), otherwise known as "District 7", on the regional level. On October 7, 2015, the PIAA voted to expand the classification system for football, basketball, baseball, and softball from four to six classifications. The vote for football passed by a 26–4 vote, while the vote for basketball, baseball, and softball passed by a 23–7 vote. All other sports still operate on the PIAA's original scale of four classifications. While most sports offered by the high school are competitive and recognized by the PIAA/WPIAL, some are noncompetitive and are not recognized by the PIAA/WPIAL, and others are combination of both.

=== Sports Offered/Classifications ===
Gateway High School offers a plethora of athletic programs. PIAA/WPIAL-recognized programs offered include cross country, football, golf, soccer, tennis, volleyball, basketball, swimming and diving, indoor track, track and field, wrestling, baseball, softball, volleyball, bowling, and lacrosse. Programs that are not PIAA/WPIAL-recognized include ice hockey and cheerleading, and therefore have no classification. Both of these programs are considered "clubs" and may or may not compete competitively while not being recognized as a school-supported sport. Per the aforementioned PIAA ruling, size classification for football, basketball, baseball, and softball sports is "AAAAA" (Five-A), which is the second largest of the six classifications (A, AA, AAA, AAAA, AAAAA, and AAAAAA). With the exception of lacrosse, size classification for all other PIAA/WPIAL-recognized programs is "AAA" (Triple-A), which is the second largest of the four classifications (A, AA, AAA, and AAAA). Lacrosse is a relatively new athletics program at Gateway High School, with its inaugural season being in 2011. Since then, officials worked hard to push for it to become a PIAA/WPIAL-recognized sport after initially operating as a club, which they eventually achieved. The Gateway High School lacrosse program is in the "AA" size classification, which is the third largest of the four classifications (A, AA, AAA, and AAAA).

=== Clubs ===
Gateway High School offers many clubs for its students to join.

Gateway's Student Councils and Student Governments play a large role in student life. They are in charge of all school dances, fund-raisers, school spirit activities, and also attend and host various leadership workshops and conferences through the Pennsylvania Association of Student Councils.

Gateway also competes in the FIRST Robotics Competition, an annual event for high-school aged participants. Gateway's team, Quasics, is FRC Team #2656. They have competed annually at the Pittsburgh Regional since 2008, and won the 2023 regional.

== History ==
Before 1948, Monroeville students could choose to attend nearby schools on a tuition basis. In the mid-1950s, the districts joined and began making plans for a new senior high school. Official action began February 1956, breaking ground in January 1957.

In 2007, the district completed its reconstruction and expansion of the high school complex. This complex includes the Monroeville Public Library, Pete Antimarino Football Stadium, the high school, Moss Side Middle School, administration offices, and various other multi-use sports fields.

== Legal issues ==
In March 2017, Franklin Vigo was sentenced to five years' probation for inappropriately touching a minor student at school. Vigo pled guilty to endangering the welfare of children. Charges of indecent assault and institutional sexual assault were dropped.

In August 2023, Micahel Carsone resigned after being accused of excessive communication with a student.

In 2021, a woman sued the school district for discrimination after being passed over for a job with the district. The suit was backed by the NAACP, and resulted in the resignation of Paul Caliari, a school board member who was implicated in the scandal.
