= Andrew Bayne Memorial Library =

Public library in Pennsylvania, United States

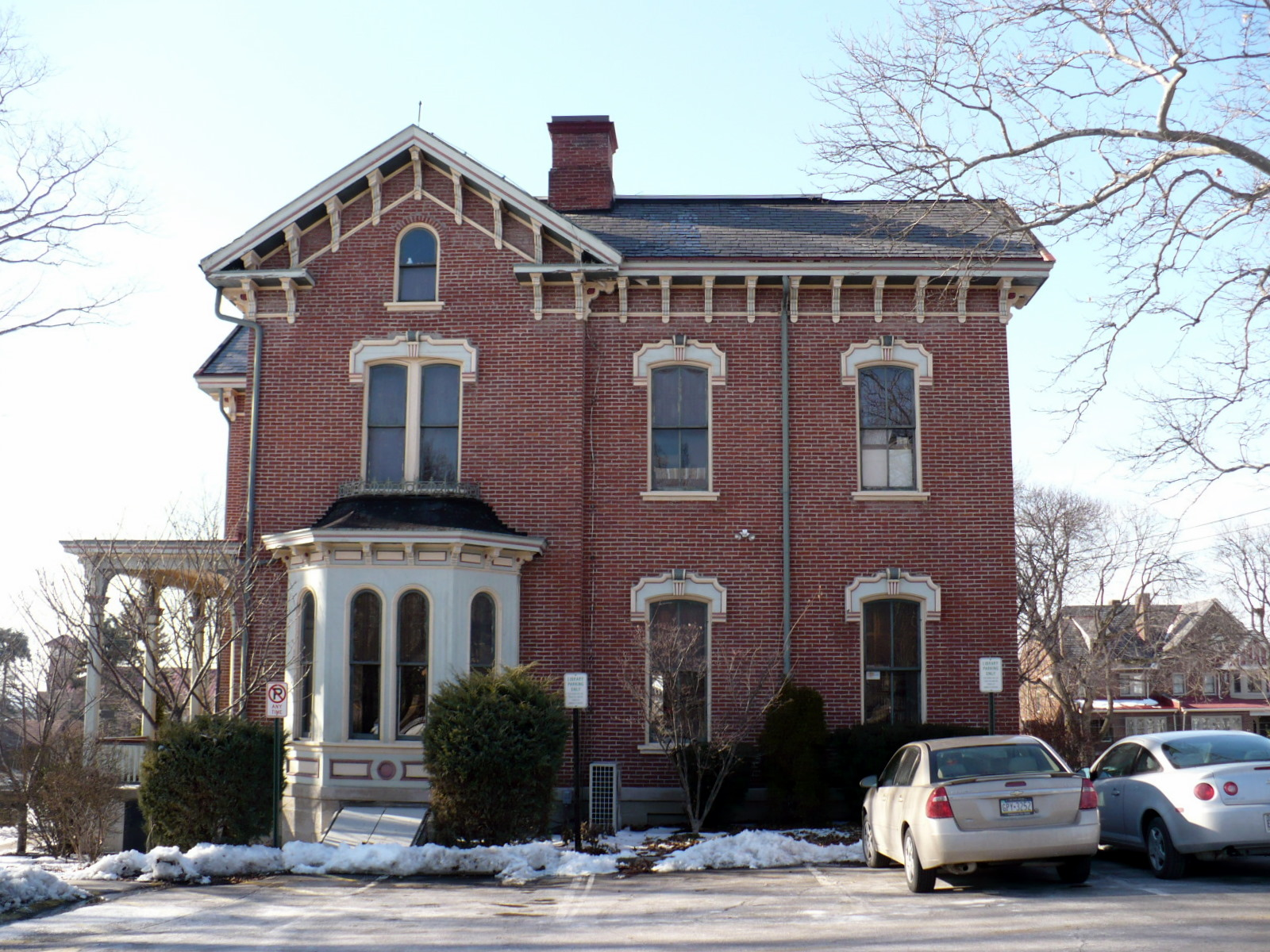
- 40°29′47″N 80°3′15″W
- Location: 34 N Balph Avenue, Pittsburgh, PA 15202
- Established: May 1914

Collection
- Size: approx. 14,000

Access and use
- Population served: 8,770 (Bellevue borough, 2000)

Other information
- Website: www.baynelibrary.org

Pittsburgh Landmark – PHLF
- Official name: Bellevue Public Library
- Designated: 1976

The Andrew Bayne Memorial Library is a public library in Bellevue, a suburb of Pittsburgh, Pennsylvania in the United States. The library sits on a four-acre (1.6 ha) parcel of land donated to Bellevue borough in 1912 by the daughters of Allegheny County sheriff Andrew Bayne, and houses approximately 14,000 print volumes.

== History ==
The historic building housing the library collection was once the home of Amanda Bayne Balph, the daughter of Andrew Bayne, the namesake of the library. Andrew Bayne was a member of the Pennsylvania Constitutional Convention of 1837–1838 and Sheriff of Allegheny County in 1838. His daughters, Amanda Balph and Jane Teece, bequeathed the homestead and 4 acres (16,000 m^{2}) surrounding it to Bellevue Borough to be used as a library and park.

Amanda's husband, James Madison Balph, was a prominent architect of Allegheny County, and designed and built the Victorian-style home in 1875. There is a marble fireplace in each room of the house, and James Balph's initials are engraved in the glass transom over the front door. Mrs. Balph, widowed in 1899, lived on in the large white house until her death in August 1912, when it became borough property.

In May 1914, a library committee announced the opening of two rooms in the old home for use as a library. Walkways were laid out, and in 1916, a swimming pool was built in the southernmost part of the park. (The pool has since been removed.) The upstairs rooms were cleaned and furnished in the early 1920s by a group of women called the Bellevue Federation, who also built tennis courts on the property.

On Memorial Day 1927, the borough formally dedicated the park and library to the citizens of Bellevue.

Today, Andrew Bayne Memorial Library is accompanied by a park. This park has playground equipment for children and a large field that is often used to play football and ultimate frisbee. Next to the field is the Jim Porch Gazebo that is reserved for parties, picnics, and family gatherings. From June-October, the park hosts the Bellevue Farmer’s Market on Wednesdays. Throughout the year, the Library offers children's activities and various holiday celebrations.

=== World War I memorial ===
On 29 May 1920, the Mothers of Democracy dedicated twelve trees in Bayne Park as memorials to "those boys whose lives were given to the cause of our always-loved freedom". On 29 November 1921, a bronze sculpture by Giuseppe Moretti was unveiled on the corner on North Balph and Teece Avenues. The monument is of the soldier as an artisan, a worker, but also a man of heroic courage, "who fought only when needed and then fought well and helped bring home a just and honorable victory". The doughboy is depicted standing with left foot on an anvil, but holding a winged figure representing liberty. The statue is 10 feet (3.0 m) tall and situated on a 4-foot (1.2 m) high granite pedestal, upon which is an inscription: "Erected by the loyal citizens of Bellevue to their patriotic sons who served in the World War. They loved peace, but dared to fight".

=== The "Lone Sentinel" ===
The "Lone Sentinel" was an elm tree (Ulmus americana) that stood in Bayne Park for approximately 400 years. In 1983, the tree was designated the largest American elm east of the Mississippi River. The tree's crown spread 320 feet (98 m) and reached 110 feet (34 m) in height. The tree had become substantially weakened by Dutch elm disease, and in May 1998, a windstorm tore a large branch, weighing several tons, from the southern side of the tree. The loss of so much of the tree's mass caused the trunk to split, and it had to be taken down in 1998.

== Library resources ==
At the time of the formal dedication, the library contained approximately 3,000 books, some of which were original gifts from the libraries of Mrs. Teece and Mrs. Balph. The first librarian, Mrs. W.R. Newell, issued 954 cards to Bellevue residents. The collection was cataloged and updated in December 1962. The recently renovated building currently houses more than 14,000 titles, several magazine subscriptions, reference materials, and Internet access.

The library is a member of the Access PA statewide library system, and the Allegheny County Library Association.
