= Allegheny County Library Association =

Coordinates: 40.44366°N 79.95111°W

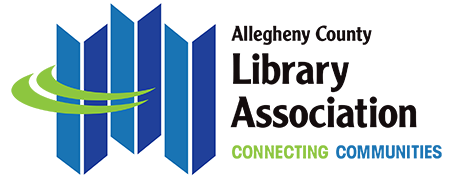
- Location: Pittsburgh, Pennsylvania
- Established: 1991

Other information
- Website: www.aclalibraries.org

The Allegheny County Library Association (ACLA) is a federated library system that highlights the work of its membership, which includes 46 independent public libraries with more than 70 locations serving the residents of Allegheny County, Pennsylvania.

ACLA operates as a collaborative organization dedicated to ensuring equitable access to high-quality library services across the entire county. Our mission is centered on empowering these local libraries in a wide variety of ways, including providing access to shared resources, administrative support, funding opportunities, and professional development. By maintaining the independence of our community libraries, ACLA allows each community library to maintain its individual character and deep local connections while benefiting from the strength and efficiency of a unified network.

ACLA believes that libraries are vital hubs for civic life, and our work is focused on championing their relevance and sustainability for future generations. We also believe that collectively we can all do more than we can individually. By pooling our collective expertise and resources, the Allegheny County Library Association ensures that every resident, regardless of where they live, has the opportunity to learn, connect, and grow through the power of their local public library.

== History ==
ACLA's story began in 1991 when the County Controller's office issued "A Quiet Crisis: Libraries in Allegheny County". This nearly 100-page report offered an in-depth discussion on the state of the libraries in Allegheny County and the problems each of the independent institutions faced.

Recommendations were made in the form of 10 steps for better citizen access and to address several key challenges – insufficient funding, deteriorating facilities, a shift in population from the urban core, and increasing use of the independent suburban libraries. The report concluded that Allegheny County's libraries needed to identify a stable source of operating support and establish a broad based organization to take advantage of potential economies of scale.

As a result of this report, the Commission on the Future of Libraries in Allegheny County (CFLAC) was established and charged with addressing the recommendations given. Additionally, the County Library Association Serving the People (CLASP) was formed as the first countywide library association, and in 1992, a County Library Director was hired with funds from The Buhl Foundation.

In 1993, the Allegheny Regional Asset District (ARAD) was authorized by an act of the Pennsylvania Legislature, and funds from half the proceeds of the 1% Allegheny County Sales and Use Tax were to be distributed to cultural assets. CLASP was designated as one of the set of contractual assets to receive funding, meaning member libraries were eligible to receive these funds.

CLASP was renamed the Allegheny County Library Association and was formally incorporated as a 501c3 in 1994. Libraries in Allegheny County were required to be members of ACLA and be eligible to receive state aid to qualify for ARAD funds. In 1995, initial ARAD funding was distributed by ACLA to the 38 suburban member libraries.

ACLA became a state recognized federated library system in 1997, and a member library agreement was structured for each system member library to sign off on. In the years following, libraries continued to become members of ACLA which provided them with dependable funding through the state and RAD. By 2016, ACLA's membership included 46 independent member libraries with more than 70 locations throughout Allegheny County.

== Allegheny County Library Association Member Libraries ==
As of 2025:

- Andrew Bayne Memorial Library
- Andrew Carnegie Free Library
- Avalon Public Library
- Baldwin Borough Public Library
- Bethel Park Public Library
- Braddock Carnegie Library
- Brentwood Library
- Bridgeville Public Library
- C.C. Mellor Memorial Library
- Carnegie Free Library of Swissvale
- Carnegie Library of Homestead
- Carnegie Library of McKeesport
- Carnegie Library of Pittsburgh
- Clairton Public Library
- Community Library of Allegheny Valley
- Community Library of Castle Shannon
- Cooper-Siegel Community Library
- Coraopolis Memorial Library
- Crafton Public Library
- Dormont Public Library
- F.O.R. Sto-Rox Library
- Green Tree Public Library
- Hampton Community Library
- Jefferson Hills Public Library
- Millvale Community Library
- Monroeville Public Library
- Moon Township Public Library
- Mt. Lebanon Public Library
- North Versailles Public Library
- Northern Tier Regional Library
- Northland Public Library
- Oakmont Carnegie Library
- Penn Hills Library
- Pleasant Hills Public Library
- Plum Borough Community Library
- Robinson Township Library
- Scott Township Public Library
- Sewickley Public Library
- Shaler North Hills Library
- South Fayette Township Library
- South Park Township Library
- Springdale Free Public Library
- Upper St. Clair Township Library
- Western Allegheny Community Library
- Whitehall Public Library
- Wilkinsburg Public Library
