= Joel Monroe =

American farmer and real estate developer

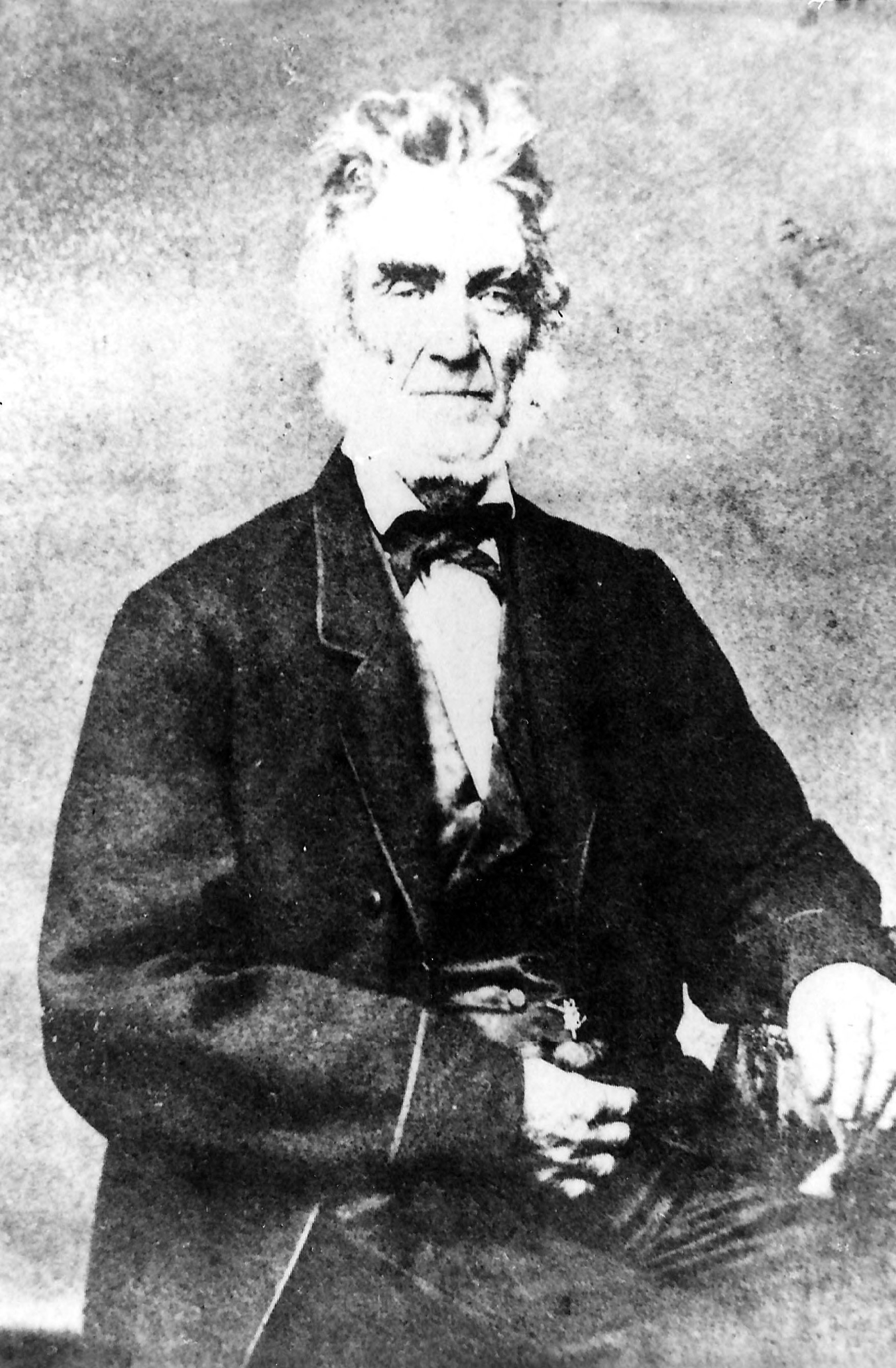
- Born: 1793; Virginia
- Died: April, 1877 (aged 84)
- Burial place: New Castle, Pennsylvania
- Known for: First postmaster of Monroeville, PA
- Spouse: Margaret Bing Monroe (m. 1815, died 1864)
- Children: Sarah, Nancy, Rebecca, Margaret, James, Mary Ann, Joel, Priscilla, and Lavenia

Joel Monroe (1793–1877) was an American farmer and real-estate developer during the 19th century. He was the eponym for the community of Monroeville, Pennsylvania.

== Biography ==
Monroe owned a farm that stretched from the Old Stone Church to the present-day Municipal Building, and it went northward into Garden City. The Tusk family owned the farm that stood on a tract measuring 122 acres (0.49 km^{2}) and 63 perches (parts of an acre), according to an 1828 deed. Monroe purchased this farmland in 1829. By selling off small lots, he encouraged development along the Northern Turnpike. In 1850, the farming community was highly developed, yet the mail was picked up in Turtle Creek.

Monroe subsequently became Monroeville's first postmaster, a position he held from 1851 to 1855. In 1855, he bought a farm in New Castle, Pennsylvania. He went on to pass the farm to his daughter, Rebecca Monroe Duff, who owned it along with her husband.

=== Marriage and children ===
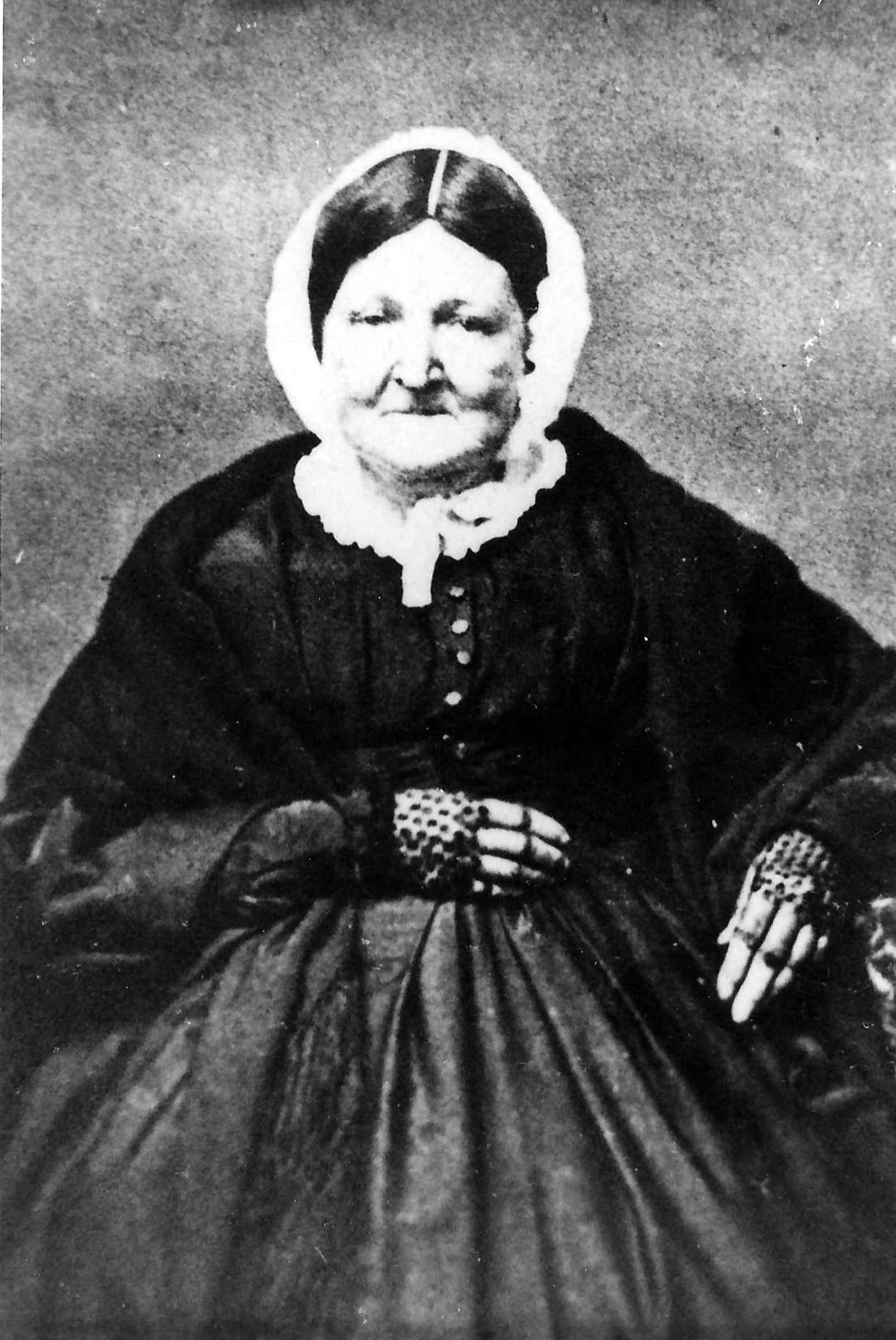
Margaret Bing Monroe, wife of Joel Monroe from 1815 until her death in 1864

Monroe married Margaret Bing of Lawrence County, Pennsylvania, on May 11, 1815. The couple had nine children: Sarah, Nancy, Rebecca, Margaret J., James M., Mary Ann, Joel, Priscilla and Lavenia.

=== Death and legacy ===
His wife perished in an 1864 house fire, and Joel died 13 years later. He was buried next to his wife at the Greenwood Cemetery in New Castle.
