= Fox's Pizza Den =

Pizza restaurant chain

Fox’s Pizza Den

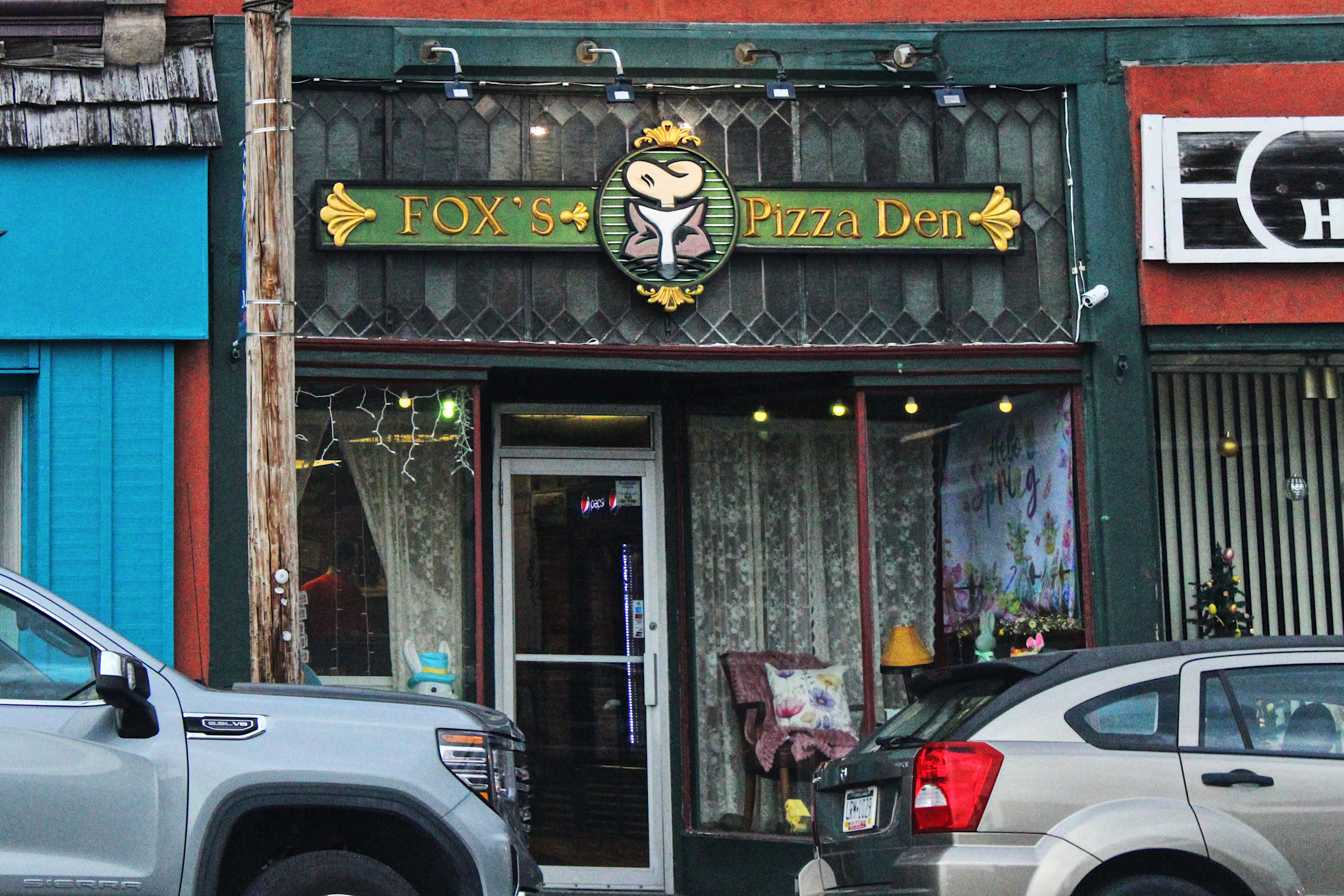
- Fox’s Pizza Den location in Scottdale, Pennsylvania
- Type: Franchise
- Industry: Restaurant
- Genre: Pizzeria
- Founded: 1971
- Founder: Jim Fox
- Headquarters: Murrysville, Pennsylvania
- Number of locations: 200+ (2025)
- Area served: United States
- Website: www.foxspizza.com

Fox's Pizza Den is a pizzeria chain based in Murrysville, Pennsylvania, United States.

== History ==
Fox’s Pizza Den was founded in 1971 by Jim Fox in Pitcairn, Pennsylvania. The first location operated out of a small rented space with secondhand equipment. Additional locations opened in nearby communities during the early 1970s. The company began offering delivery service in 1973. Franchising expanded during the 1970s, allowing independently owned locations to operate under the Fox’s Pizza Den name. By the 1990s, a distribution system was established to supply franchisees with ingredients and products. By the 2020s, the chain had grown to more than 200 locations in approximately 25 states, all franchise-owned.

Fox’s Pizza Den operates through a franchise system, with most locations owned and operated independently. The Small Business Administration recognized Jim Fox during the National Small Business Week from May 5–11, 2002.
