= Pittsburgh–Monroeville Airport =

Private airport in Monroeville, Pennsylvania

Pittsburgh–Monroeville Airport - CLOSED Harold W. Brown Memorial Airfield
- IATA: none; ICAO: none; FAA LID: 15PA

Summary
- Airport type: Private - CLOSED
- Owner: Estate of Helen M. Brown
- Serves: Monroeville, Pennsylvania
- Elevation AMSL: 1,187 ft / 362 m
- Coordinates: 40°27′08″N 079°46′29″W
- Interactive map of Pittsburgh–Monroeville Airport - CLOSED

Runways
Direction	Length		Surface
Direction	ft	m	Surface
5/23	2,280	695	Asphalt

Statistics (2007)
- Aircraft operations: 5,709
- Based aircraft: 17
- Source: Federal Aviation Administration

Pittsburgh–Monroeville Airport (FAA LID: 15PA) was a private airport located one nautical mile (1.8 km) north of the central business district of Monroeville, in Allegheny County, Pennsylvania, United States. The airport was privately owned by the estate of Harold and Helen Brown and was also known as Harold W. Brown Memorial Field after its founder.

Prior to its closing, 2,000 planes landed and took off at the airport every year, according to former manager Ray Wible. Pilots using the field paid $3 (on the honor system) to defray the expenses of mowing the grass and maintaining the runway for an overnight stay.

The airport hosted a gathering every other year for the Aero Club of Pittsburgh. The airport buildings also served as the meeting place for Cadet Squad 604 of the Civil Air Patrol.

The airfield was used as a filming location in a pivotal scene in the 1978 horror film Dawn of the Dead, and an exterior set of Jordy Verrill's space-grass-covered farmhouse was constructed on a grassy slope behind the main runway for the 1982 George A. Romero/Stephen King film Creepshow.

In 2023 The airport was sold to Clover Communities Monroeville LLC, which has built an assisted-living apartment complex on the property.

== History ==
Harold and Helen Bohinski Brown opened Pittsburgh–Monroeville Airport in 1948. Before it closed in the early 1970s, it was noted for its air shows that attracted hundreds of spectators and for handling the air mail for the Wilmerding Post Office.

At one time Pittsburgh–Monroeville Airport housed sixteen privately owned planes in several hangars, down from 74 in 1970, and 112 between 1952 and 1958.

In 2021, the primary charthouse was severely damaged when vandals lit a fire inside. In 2023 the airport was razed by CCM – including all hangars, runways, charthouse, and maintenance hangar – to make way for a senior living facility. No visible remnants of the airport remain.

== Facilities and aircraft ==
Pittsburgh–Monroeville Airport covered an area of 63 acres (25 ha) at an elevation of 1,187 feet (362 m) above mean sea level. It has one runway designated 5/23 with a 2,280 by 28 ft (695 x 9 m) asphalt surface. For the 12-month period ending June 12, 2007, the airport had 5,709 aircraft operations, an average of 15 per day: 99.8% general aviation and <0.2% military. At that time there were 17 aircraft based at this airport: 94% single-engine and 6% ultralight.

== See also ==
- List of airports in Pennsylvania
