= Allegheny Regional Asset District =

Special purpose unit of local government in Allegheny County, Pennsylvania

- Founded: 1993 (33 years ago)
- Location(s): Regional Enterprise Tower; Pittsburgh, Pennsylvania
- Region served: Pittsburgh & Allegheny County
- Website: RADWorksHere.org

The Allegheny Regional Asset District (RAD) is a special purpose unit of local government in Allegheny County, Pennsylvania. Its physical boundaries are the same as those of Allegheny County, and include the City of Pittsburgh.

== History ==
The district was authorized by an act of the Pennsylvania Legislature (Act 77) on December 22, 1993. It provides grants from half of the proceeds of the 1% Allegheny County Sales and Use Tax.

The County levied the tax in March 1994 and every municipal government in Allegheny County voted to participate in its benefits. 25% of the funds go directly to the County and 25% goes to the other municipal governments based on a formula weighted to help distressed communities. The proceeds are used to help shift the tax burden away from property taxes and for municipal functions such as road repair and police protection. Municipal funds do not go through the RAD Board; they are distributed directly to the municipalities from the Commonwealth. The remaining 50% is distributed by RAD.

== Mission ==
RAD grants are distributed to civic, cultural and recreational entities, libraries, parks and sports facilities. The distribution is made by a Board of Directors composed of four persons appointed by the County Chief Executive, two appointed by the Mayor of Pittsburgh and one person elected by the six appointees. The six appointees serve terms concurrent with the appointing authority while the seventh member serves for two years. The Board also appoints a 27-person Advisory Board to provide public input and comment on policies and procedures.

The District's annual budget process ends with the adoption of a budget in December for the following calendar year. Each proposed allocation requires the support of six members. All meetings and votes of the Board are conducted under the provisions of Pennsylvania's Sunshine Act which requires public meetings and opportunities for public comment.

For 2018, the District adopted a budget of $99.9 million budget; about 32% of the funding will go to libraries, 30% to parks, trails and other green spaces, 15% to the sports and civic facilities, 12% to art and cultural organizations, 8% to regional facilities (Pittsburgh Zoo, National Aviary, Phipps Conservatory) and 3% to transit. Less than 1% is budgeted for administration.

The greatest share of RAD funding goes to contractual assets which received guaranteed funding for an initial period of five years (2005-2009); five year renewals were adopted in 2010 and 2015. Their total RAD funding for 2018 is nearly $72.4 million:

- Allegheny County Library Association
- Allegheny County – Regional Parks
- Carnegie Library of Pittsburgh
- Carnegie Museums of Pittsburgh
- City of McKeesport – Regional Park: Renziehausen Park Rose Garden and Arboretum
- City of Pittsburgh – Regional Parks: Frick Park, Schenley Park, Highland Park, Riverview Park, Emerald View Park
- The National Aviary in Pittsburgh
- Phipps Conservatory and Botanical Gardens
- Pittsburgh Zoo & Aquarium

RAD also funds multi-year assets, which have been guaranteed funding for more than one year. In 2018, the multi-year grants total about $14.1 million and, as in prior years, pays debt service on 1) bonds that were issued to support the Civic Arena project and related developments, and 2) bonds issued for the construction of Heinz Field, PNC Park and the David L. Lawrence Convention Center.

- The Sports & Exhibition Authority of Pittsburgh and Allegheny County

Each year, other eligible entities can submit applications for annual grants. The total RAD funding for this group for 2018 is about $12.5 million, more than two-thirds of which goes to large, well-established organizations in the region, such as:

- Allegheny Land Trust
- Children's Museum of Pittsburgh
- Historical Society of Western Pennsylvania
- Manchester Craftsmen's Guild
- Pittsburgh Ballet Theater
- Pittsburgh Civic Light Opera
- Pittsburgh Cultural Trust
- Pittsburgh Filmmakers
- Pittsburgh Opera
- Pittsburgh Public Theater
- Pittsburgh Symphony Society
- River City Brass Band
- Soldiers and Sailors Memorial Hall
- Western Pennsylvania Conservancy
- WQED Multimedia

The balance goes to smaller organizations, including arts and culture organizations, as well as organizations that have parks and green spaces. Funding priorities also include the Special Project grants, which are directed at: 1) Accessibility/Inclusion Grants as part of its Regional Assets are for Everyone Initiative; and 2) Connections Grants designed to assist in the implementation of mergers or shared agreements that result in cost-savings.

RAD annual sponsors its signature RADical Days event, featuring free admission and performances on select days by RAD-funded regional assets. RADical Days typically takes place in the early fall.

== Board members ==
Daniel J. Griffin, Chair, Appointed by Allegheny County Executive Rich Fitzgerald; term coincides with the term of office of the appointing authority and until its successor is appointed and qualified.

Dusty Elias Kirk, Vice-Chair, Appointed by Allegheny County Executive Rich Fitzgerald; term coincides with the term of office of the appointing authority and until its successor is appointed and qualified.

Sylvia Fields, Secretary-Treasurer, Appointed by City of Pittsburgh Mayor Bill Peduto; term coincides with the term of office of the appointing authority and until its successor is appointed and qualified.

Jackie Dixon, Appointed by Allegheny County Executive Rich Fitzgerald; term coincides with the term of office of the appointing authority and until its successor is appointed and qualified.

Don Linzer, Appointed by City of Pittsburgh Mayor Bill Peduto; term coincides with the term of office of the appointing authority and until its successor is appointed and qualified.

Dr. Daniel Rosen, Dr. Rosen is the at-large member of the board; term expires in June 2018.

Anthony J. Ross, Appointed by Allegheny County Executive Rich Fitzgerald; term coincides with the term of office of the appointing authority and until its successor is appointed and qualified.
