= Darienne Driver =

American education official (born 1978)

Darienne Driver Hudson (born 1978) is an American education official and nonprofit executive. She joined United Way for Southeastern Michigan as president and CEO in July 2018.

Before joining United Way, Driver Hudson spent the previous four years as superintendent of Milwaukee Public Schools, one of the largest school districts in the United States and the largest school district in Wisconsin. Driver Hudson was appointed superintendent in October 2014, becoming the youngest person to serve as Superintendent of the Milwaukee school district, and the only woman to do so on a permanent basis.

In 2017, Driver Hudson was elected to sit on the Harvard Board of Overseers.

== Early life and education ==
Driver Hudson attended Spelman College, where she received an undergraduate degree in child development. She later received master's degrees in education from Harvard University and in curriculum development from the University of Michigan. She also received a doctorate from Harvard in Urban Superintendency.

== Career ==
Driver Hudson began her career as an elementary school teacher at Detroit Public Schools. She later served as Coordinator of Strategic Management and Accountability and Special Assistant to the Superintendent in Clayton County Public Schools. Driver Hudson then served as Deputy Chief of Empowerment Schools for the School District of Philadelphia.

Driver Hudson became the first Chief Innovation Officer for Milwaukee Public Schools in June 2012. In that role, she worked to narrow the achievement gap in the district.

As superintendent of Milwaukee Public Schools, Driver Hudson focused on improving the academic outcomes of students. She initiated a regional development plan to expand high-performing programs and increase enrollment opportunities, expand advanced placement opportunities, expand college and career readiness programs, and the create a new department to improve the educational achievement of Black and Latino male students.

Driver Hudson has served on the board of directors for the United Way of Greater Milwaukee and Waukesha County, where she also served as chair of the Volunteer Engagement Committee; City Year Milwaukee; Bradley Tech Commission; The Public Policy Forum; Aspin Superintendent Network; and, Junior Achievement. Driver Hudson was a member of the Executive Council for Milwaukee Succeeds and serves as Chair for the Council of the Great City Schools.

== Awards and recognition ==
During her tenure as superintendent, Milwaukee Public Schools earned a Silver Well Workplace award from the Wellness Council of America and a Distinguished Budget Presentation award from the Government Finance Officers Association. In January 2015, Driver Hudson was a "40 Under 40 award recipient" from Milwaukee Business Journal. In 2017, Driver Hudson was named Most Valuable Person by the Boys & Girls Clubs of Greater Milwaukee.
