= Historical Society of Western Pennsylvania =

The Historical Society of Western Pennsylvania (HSWP) is a cultural organization in Pittsburgh, Pennsylvania.

== History ==
After several attempts during the early and mid-century to establish a historical society, an organization called Old Residents of Pittsburgh and Western Pennsylvania was formed on January 10, 1879. Five years later the group changed its name to Historical Society of Western Pennsylvania.

In 1911, society members oversaw the planning and implementation of special events held in conjunction with the centennial of the start of steam navigation services on western rivers.

On February, 17, 1914, the Historical Society of Western Pennsylvania opened its new building on Grant Boulevard near Parkman in Pittsburgh's Schenley district. The Pittsburgh Daily Post reported that "its first concern [was] to foster the patriotism and higher citizenship of the community through giving a more general and accurate knowledge of the people who have built up this section" in a manner that would "stimulate the people of today to their best efforts."

In 1931, historical society leaders recruited Solon Buck, director of the Minnesota Historical Society, to lead the Historical Society of Western Pennsylvania. He was also charged with heading up a five-year research project that was slated to document the history of the Pittsburgh region at an estimated cost of $95,000. That project was supported by faculty and students of the history department of the University of Pittsburgh and the Buhl Foundation.

In 1985, the Historical Society of Western Pennsylvania partnered with the Country Song and Dance Society to present a four-day educational series, "Life, Labor and Leisure in the New Republic," which was funded by the Pennsylvania Humanities Council and focused on the "economic and political conditions of the 1790-1850 period."

Now the region's oldest cultural organization, HSWP does business as and operates both the Senator John Heinz History Center and the Meadowcroft Rockshelter.

== History Center ==
The History Center opened in 1996 in Pittsburgh's Strip District and receives funding from various private, foundation and governmental sources as well as public sources including the Allegheny Regional Asset District. The Detre Library and Archives on the sixth floor are free and open to the public to use. The History Center includes the Library & Archives, which preserves hundreds of thousands of books, manuscripts, photographs, maps, atlases, newspapers, films and recordings documenting over 250 years of life in the region; and the Western Pennsylvania Sports Museum, a museum-within-a-museum documenting Pittsburgh's extensive sports legacy.

== See also ==
- List of historical societies in Pennsylvania
