= Renziehausen Park Rose Garden and Arboretum =

City park in McKeesport, Pennsylvania, US

Coordinates: 40.3401°N 79.8241°W

- Interactive map of Renziehausen Park Rose Garden and Arboretum
- Location: McKeesport, Pennsylvania
- Area: 205 acres (83 ha)
- Website: Official website

Renziehausen Park Rose Garden and Arboretum is a 205 acres (83 ha) city park with rose garden and arboretum located on Eden Park Boulevard off Walnut Street, in the Pittsburgh suburb of McKeesport, Pennsylvania. It is open to the public daily without charge.

The rose garden contains some 1,200 rose bushes in 28 beds, plus an additional 3 raised beds containing 300 miniature rose bushes. The park also includes a bandshell, baseball fields, exercise trails, a fishing pond, picnic pavilions, tennis courts, and restrooms.

Renziehausen Park is named for siblings Henry and Emilie Renziehausen. When they died, they left their money to the city of Pittsburgh after a family dispute over religion. The park features a lake named after Emilie Renziehausen.

== McKeesport Regional History & Heritage Center ==
The McKeesport Regional History & Heritage Center is a local history museum in the park. The museum includes a portrait of Henry Renziehausen, as well as displays of local memorabilia and photographs.

== See also ==
- List of botanical gardens in the United States
