= Pitcairn, Pennsylvania =

Borough in Pennsylvania, US

- Borough
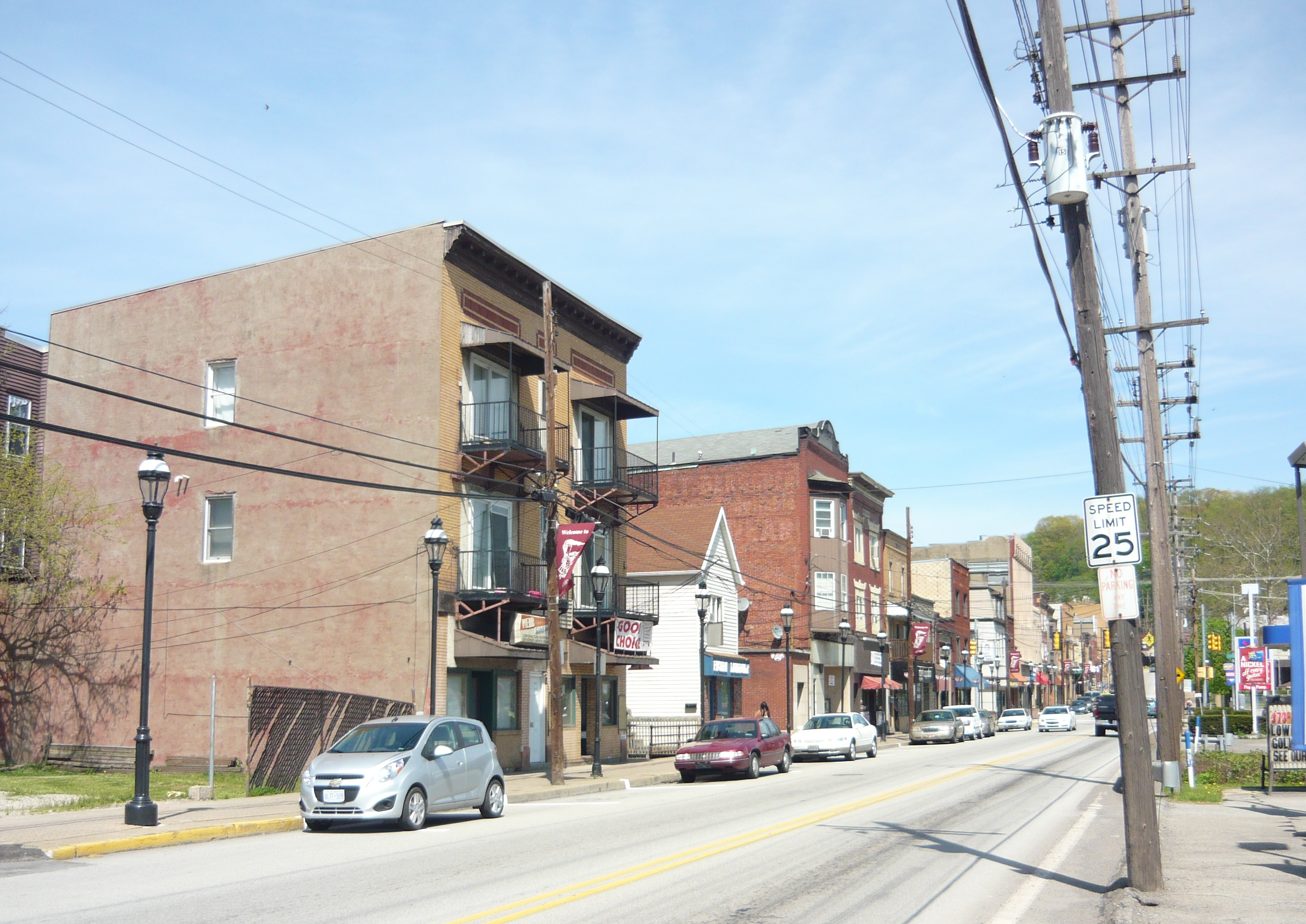
- Broadway Boulevard

- Location in Allegheny County and the U.S. state of Pennsylvania.
- Coordinates: 40°24′21″N 79°46′35″W
- Country: United States
- State: Pennsylvania
- County: Allegheny

Area
  - Total: 0.51 sq mi (1.31 km^{2})
  - Land: 0.51 sq mi (1.31 km^{2})
  - Water: 0 sq mi (0.00 km^{2})

Population (2020)
  - Total: 3,101
  - Density: 6,133.8/sq mi (2,368.28/km^{2})
- Time zone: UTC-5 (Eastern (EST))
  - Summer (DST): UTC-4 (EDT)
- ZIP code: 15140
- FIPS code: 42-60712
- Website: pitcairnborough.us

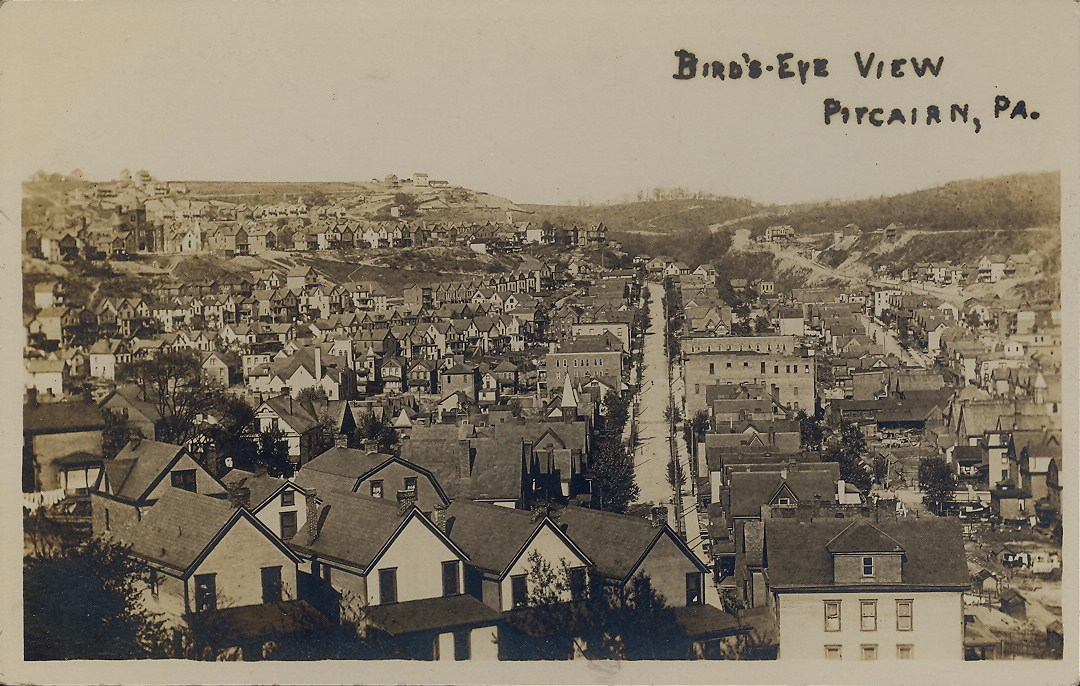
Bird's eye view of Pitcairn, about 1909

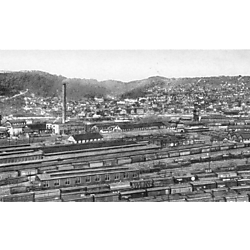
View of the PRR railyard at Pitcairn, 1945

Pitcairn /ˈpɪtkɛərn/ is a borough in Allegheny County, Pennsylvania, United States, located 12 miles (19 km) east of Pittsburgh's central business district, named for Robert Pitcairn, an official of the Pennsylvania Railroad.

Early in the 20th century, Pitcairn was the site of large railroad yards and shops that employed nearly ten thousand men. The population increased from 2,601 in 1900 to 6,310 in 1940, but has since declined. The population was 3,101 at the 2020 census.

== History ==
The settlement that would become modern Pitcairn began to grow on the banks of Turtle Creek in 1841 when farmer John McGinnis began sell land to fellow settlers.

In 1850, the Pennsylvania Railroad purchased a corridor from McGinnis. In 1874, Robert Pitcairn of the Pennsylvania Railroad purchased a further 215 acres in the area to serve as a new hub for the Pittsburgh railyard, the original location of which was deemed too small to support the growing level of rail traffic in the region.

During the late 1800s, the growing settlement was called "Wallurba" by residents. In 1894, the settlement separated from current-day Monroeville (formerly known as Patton Township) and was incorporated as the borough of Pitcairn.

The Pitcairn Rail Yard operated by the Pennsylvania Railroad facilitated the growth of Pitcairn into a robust industrial community during the first half of the 20th century. In 1950, the Pennsylvania Railroad decided to expand the Conway Terminal north of Pittsburgh. This led to a slow decline of the importance of the Pitcairn Rail Yard in the second half of the 20th century, and a subsequent population decline in the borough.

In 1996, the Pitcairn Rail Yard was re-opened as an intermodal facility, operated since 2012 by Norfolk Southern.

== Demographics ==
Historical population
Census	Pop.	Note	%±
1900	2,601		—
1910	4,975		91.3%
1920	5,738		15.3%
1930	6,317		10.1%
1940	6,310		−0.1%
1950	5,857		−7.2%
1960	5,383		−8.1%
1970	4,741		−11.9%
1980	4,175		−11.9%
1990	4,087		−2.1%
2000	3,689		−9.7%
2010	3,294		−10.7%
2020	3,101		−5.9%

=== 2020 census ===
As of the 2020 census, Pitcairn had a population of 3,101. The median age was 38.8 years. 24.1% of residents were under the age of 18 and 17.2% of residents were 65 years of age or older. For every 100 females there were 90.6 males, and for every 100 females age 18 and over there were 84.4 males age 18 and over.

100.0% of residents lived in urban areas, while 0.0% lived in rural areas.

There were 1,405 households in Pitcairn, of which 25.2% had children under the age of 18 living in them. Of all households, 23.8% were married-couple households, 25.5% were households with a male householder and no spouse or partner present, and 41.6% were households with a female householder and no spouse or partner present. About 41.8% of all households were made up of individuals and 17.6% had someone living alone who was 65 years of age or older.

There were 1,705 housing units, of which 17.6% were vacant. The homeowner vacancy rate was 3.3% and the rental vacancy rate was 15.6%.

Racial composition as of the 2020 census
Race	Number	Percent
White	2,038	65.7%
Black or African American	795	25.6%
American Indian and Alaska Native	1	0.0%
Asian	15	0.5%
Native Hawaiian and Other Pacific Islander	6	0.2%
Some other race	18	0.6%
Two or more races	228	7.4%
Hispanic or Latino (of any race)	71	2.3%

=== 2000 census ===
As of the 2000 census, there were 3,689 people, 1,675 households, and 911 families residing in the borough. The population density was 6,892.2 inhabitants per square mile (2,661.1/km^{2}). There were 1,901 housing units at an average density of 3,551.7 per square mile (1,371.3/km^{2}). The racial makeup of the borough was 98.10% White, 0.43% African American, 0.11% Native American, 0.41% Asian, 0.05% from other races, and 0.89% from two or more races. Hispanic or Latino of any race were 0.54% of the population.

There were 1,675 households, out of which 24.7 percent had children under the age of eighteen living with them, 35.9 percent were married couples living together, 13.8 percent had a female householder with no husband present, and 45.6 percent were non-families. Of all households, 39.3 percent were made up of individuals, and 14.6 percent had someone living alone who was sixty-five years of age or older. The average household size was 2.20 and the average family size was 2.98.

In the borough, the population was spread out, with 22.2 percent under the age of eighteen, 9.8 percent from eighteen to twenty-four, 30.7 percent from twenty-five to forty-four, 21.3 percent from forty-five to sixty-four, and 16 percent who were sixty-five years of age or older. The median age was thirty-seven years. For every 100 females, there were 90.9 males. For every 100 females age eighteen and over, there were 90.4 males.

The median income for a household in the borough was $25,688, and the median income for a family was $34,226. Males had a median income of $30,637 versus $21,312 for females. The per capita income for the borough was $14,785. About 7.2 percent of families and 12 percent of the population were below the poverty line, including 13.6 percent of those under age 18 and 12.0 percent of those age 65 or over.

== Notable people ==
Pitcairn was the birthplace of bandleader Ted Weems and of musical instrument maker Carl Thompson, as well as early NFL football player Harry Robb. Pitcairn was also the birthplace of Robert Dewees "Cutty" Cutshall, a trombonist who played with the bands of Jan Savitt, Benny Goodman, Eddie Condon, and was a founding member of Lawson/Haggart's World's Greatest Jazz Band. Cutty's base was out of New York City, where he made countless records and also played at the world-famous Rainbow Room.

== Economic activity ==
Pitcairn Yard, which opened in 1892 and was for many decades a major switching yard of the Pennsylvania Railroad, later the Penn Central Railroad and Conrail, is now, since the 1990s, an intermodal freight transport yard for the Norfolk Southern Railway, where containers are taken off trains and transferred to trucks for delivery, or from trucks to trains.

In 1971, the first Fox's Pizza Den was opened on Broadway Boulevard in Pitcairn. It remains open to this day.

Pitcairn operates its own power distribution system and municipally owned Government-access television (GATV) cable television system.

== Education ==
K–12 students in Pitcairn are served by the Gateway School District, a public school district with a student population of 4,300.

In February 2012, the Gateway School Board approved a Propel charter school proposal to open a kindergarten through eighth grade charter school within the district's borders. Propel operates nine schools in Allegheny County. The Propel charter school re-opened the former Pitcairn Elementary Building on Agatha Street, which the Gateway board had closed in 2011. The school opened with little controversy to approximately 300 kindergarten through sixth grade students in August 2012, with a planned expansion to eighth grade over the following two years.

== Government and politics ==
The incumbent mayor of Pitcairn is Betsy Stevick and she serves alongside seven council members. Meetings of the government are conducted inside the council chambers of the Merle and Olive Lee Gilliand Borough Building on Broadway Boulevard.

Presidential election results
Year	Republican	Democratic	Third parties
2020	48% 635	50% 668	2% 27
2016	49% 628	50% 645	1% 18
2012	47% 582	52% 641	1% 12

== Law enforcement ==
The borough is served by the local Pitcairn Police Department. As of 2022, the Chief of Police is Scott Farally. The department's jurisdiction covers both Pitcairn and Wilmerding. Additionally, it works in conjunction with nearby law enforcement agencies such as the Allegheny County Police Department, Turtle Creek Police Department, and Pennsylvania State Police.
