= Pennsylvania Library Association =

Professional association for librarians in Pennsylvania

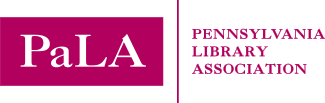
- Abbreviation: PaLA
- Founded: 1901; 125 years ago
- Legal status: 501(c)(3) nonprofit organization
- Headquarters: Mechanicsburg, Pennsylvania
- Executive Director: Christi Buker
- Employees: 4
- Website: www.palibraries.org

The Pennsylvania Library Association (PaLA) is the professional association for librarians in the U.S. state of Pennsylvania. It represents about 2,000 members affiliated with public, academic, special, and school libraries throughout the state, and was founded in 1901.

Located in Mechanicsburg, Pennsylvania, PaLA represents the interests of the profession to the Legislature and others in state government. It has programs providing opportunities for professional growth, leadership development, and continuing education for librarians. It makes annual awards to honor noteworthy librarians and library supporters. Small grants and scholarships are available for worthy recipients.

The association is governed by a 16-member board, and has a four-member staff. The membership consists of qualified persons in the personal, institutional, and commercial categories.

PaLA is organized into eight regional chapters, the better to promote librarianship and library service on a focused geographical basis. Each member is assigned membership in a chapter based on the county in which his or her library is located, if the member is retired, or the county in which they live.

Committees and special interest groups include College & Research Division; Buildings & Equipment; Digital Resources; Technical Services; Archives; Awards; Intellectual Freedom; Legislative Information; Membership; Nominations & Elections; Organization & Bylaws; Public Relations; and Scholarship.

== See also ==
- List of libraries in the United States
