= Monroeville, Pennsylvania =

Borough in Pennsylvania, US

- Borough
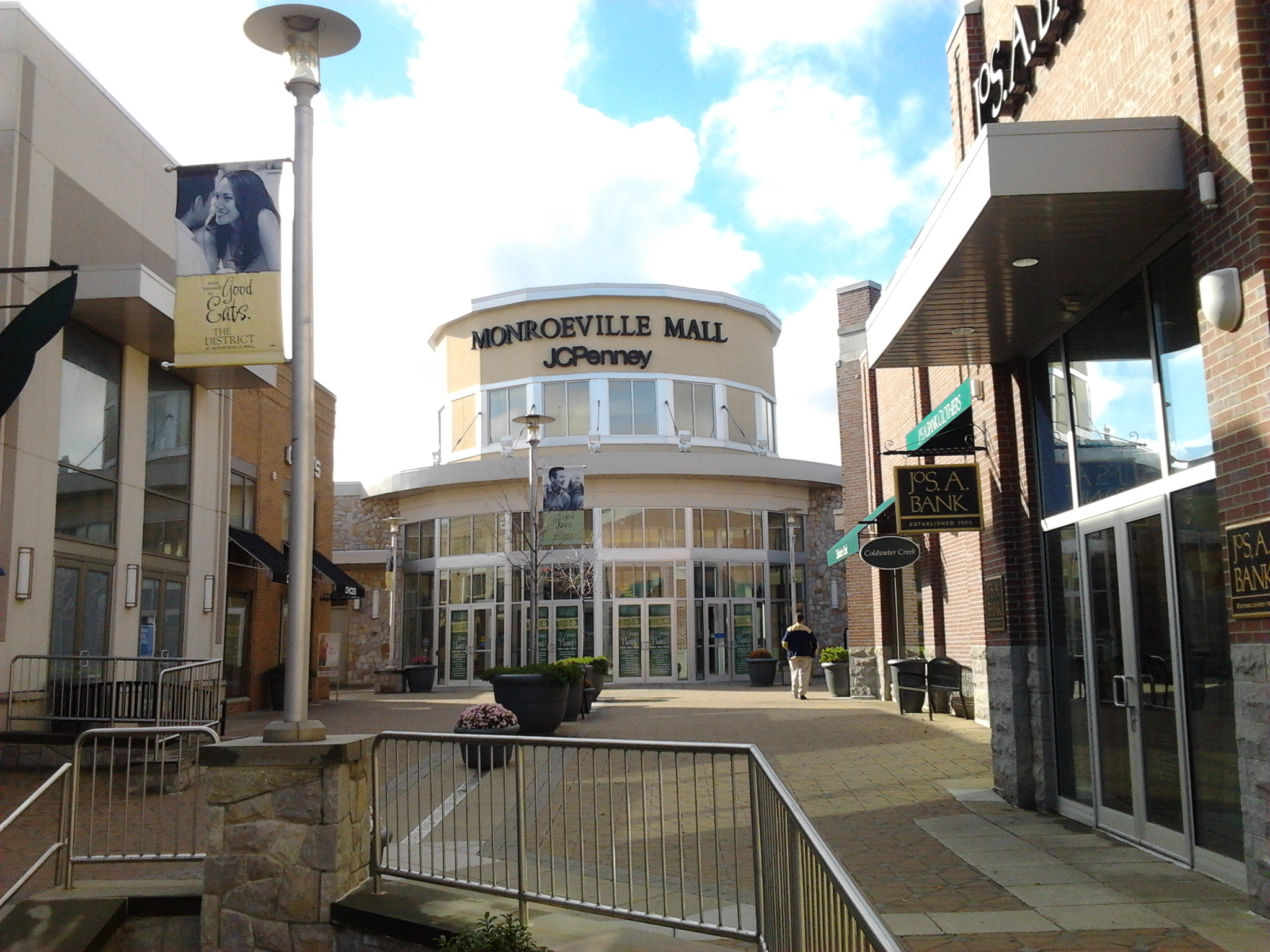
- Monroeville Mall

- Flag Seal
- Interactive map of Monroeville, Pennsylvania
- Location within Pennsylvania Location within the United States
- Coordinates: 40°25′52″N 79°45′55″W
- Country: United States
- State: Pennsylvania
- County: Allegheny
- Incorporated: January 25, 1951

Government
  - Mayor: Dennis Biondo

Area
  - Total: 19.72 sq mi (51.08 km^{2})
  - Land: 19.71 sq mi (51.06 km^{2})
  - Water: 0.0077 sq mi (0.02 km^{2})
- Elevation: 735–1,319 ft (224–402 m)

Population (2020)
  - Total: 28,640
  - Density: 1,452.6/sq mi (560.87/km^{2})
- Time zone: UTC−5 (EST)
  - Summer (DST): UTC−4 (EDT)
- ZIP code: 15146
- Area code: 412
- FIPS code: 42-50528
- Website: www.monroeville.pa.us

Monroeville is a home-rule municipality in Allegheny County, Pennsylvania, United States. It is a suburb with mixed residential and commercial developments located about 10 miles (16 km) east of Pittsburgh. The population was 28,640 at the 2020 census.

== History ==
Named for Joel Monroe, the area's first postmaster, Monroeville was settled in the mid- to late 19th century. The area was incorporated as Patton Township in 1849 before becoming the borough of Monroeville on January 25, 1951. Monroeville became a Home Rule Charter Municipality on May 21, 1974.

== Geography ==
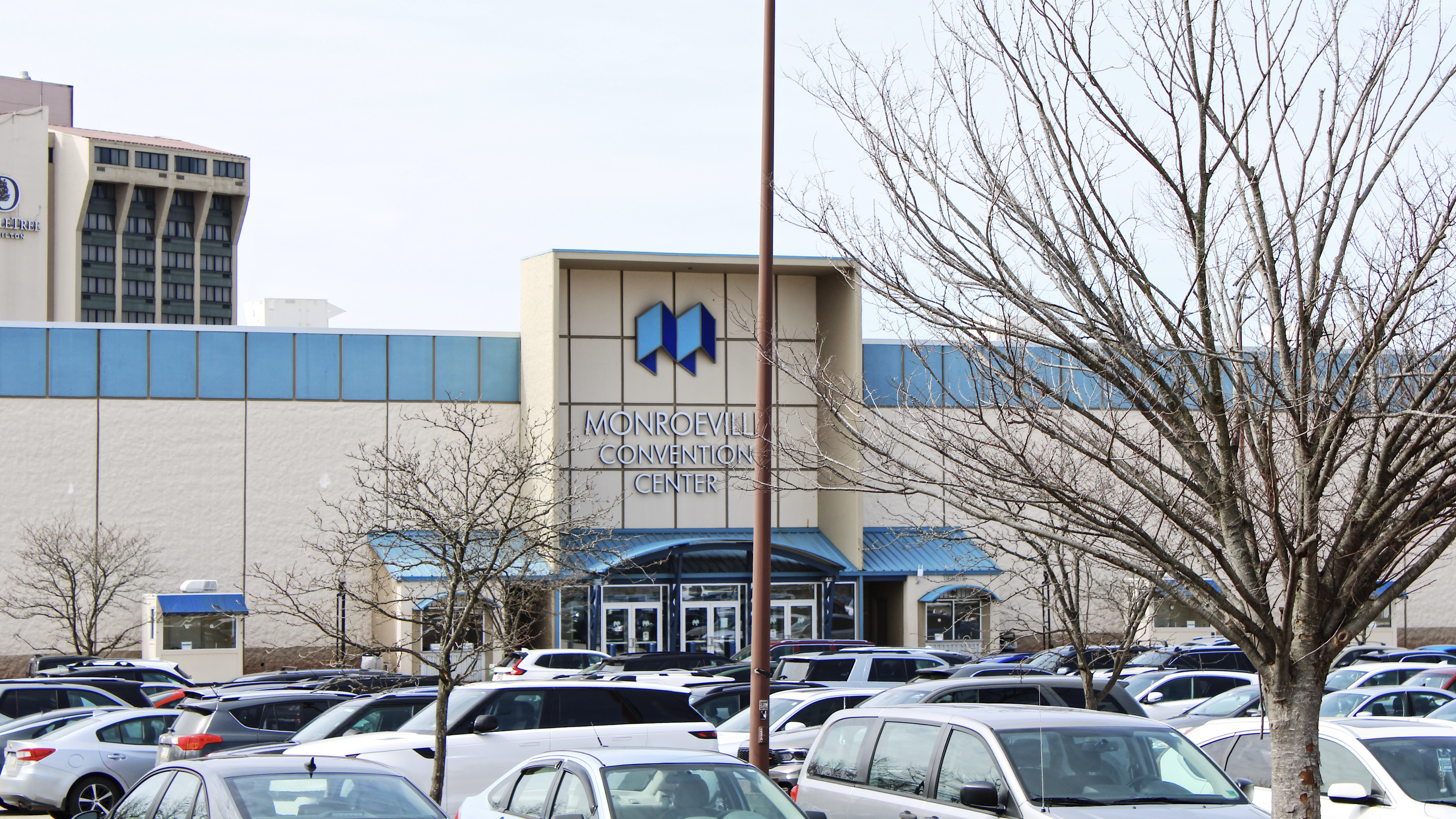
Monroeville Convention Center in March 2026

A suburb of Pittsburgh, Monroeville is located at 40°25′52″N 79°45′55″W. According to the U.S. Census Bureau, the municipality has a total area of 19.8 square miles (51 km^{2}), of which 0.05% is covered by water.

Monroeville has nine borders, including Plum to the north, Murrysville in Westmoreland County to the east, Penn Township in Westmoreland County to the southeast, Trafford in Westmoreland County to the south, North Versailles, Wilmerding and Turtle Creek to the southwest, Wilkins Township to the west, and Penn Hills to the northwest. Also, the borough of Pitcairn is entirely situated inside Monroeville in the south-southwest area.

== Demographics ==
Historical population
Census	Pop.	Note	%±
1960	22,446		—
1970	29,011		29.2%
1980	30,977		6.8%
1990	29,169		−5.8%
2000	29,349		0.6%
2010	28,386		−3.3%
2020	28,640		0.9%

As of the census of 2010, 28,386 people lived in Monroeville. The racial makeup of the city was 79.51% White, 12.58% African American, 6.07% Asian, and 0.42% from other races. Hispanics or Latinos of any race were 1.41% of the population. Monroeville is one of the most racially diverse places in the Pittsburgh area.

As of the census of 2000, 29,349 people, 12,376 households, and 8,044 families resided in the city. The population density was 1,483.0 inhabitants per square mile (572.6/km^{2}). The 13,159 housing units had an average density of 664.9 per square mile (256.7/km^{2}). The racial makeup of the city was 85.58% White, 8.29% African American, 0.14% Native American, 4.41% Asian, 0.04% Pacific Islander, 0.30% from other races, and 1.23% from two or more races. Hispanics or Latinos of any race were 0.77% of the population.

Of the 12,376 households, 25.8% had children under 18 living with them, 52.7% were married couples living together, 9.7% had a female householder with no husband present, and 35.0% were not families. About 30.8% of all households were made up of individuals, and 12.1% had someone living alone who was 65 or older. The average household size was 2.30 and the average family size was 2.89.

In the city, the age distribution was 20.4% under 18, 6.2% from 18 to 24, 27.4% from 25 to 44, 25.8% from 45 to 64, and 20.3% who were 65 or older. The median age was 43 years. For every 100 females, there were 88.5 males. For every 100 females 18 and over, there were 84.8 males.

The median income for a household in the borough was $44,653, and for a family was $53,474. Males had a median income of $41,100 versus $30,232 for females. The per capita income for the borough was $24,031. About 4.9% of families and 6.6% of the population were below the poverty line, including 9.4% of those under 18 and 6.1% of those 65 or over.

== Economy ==
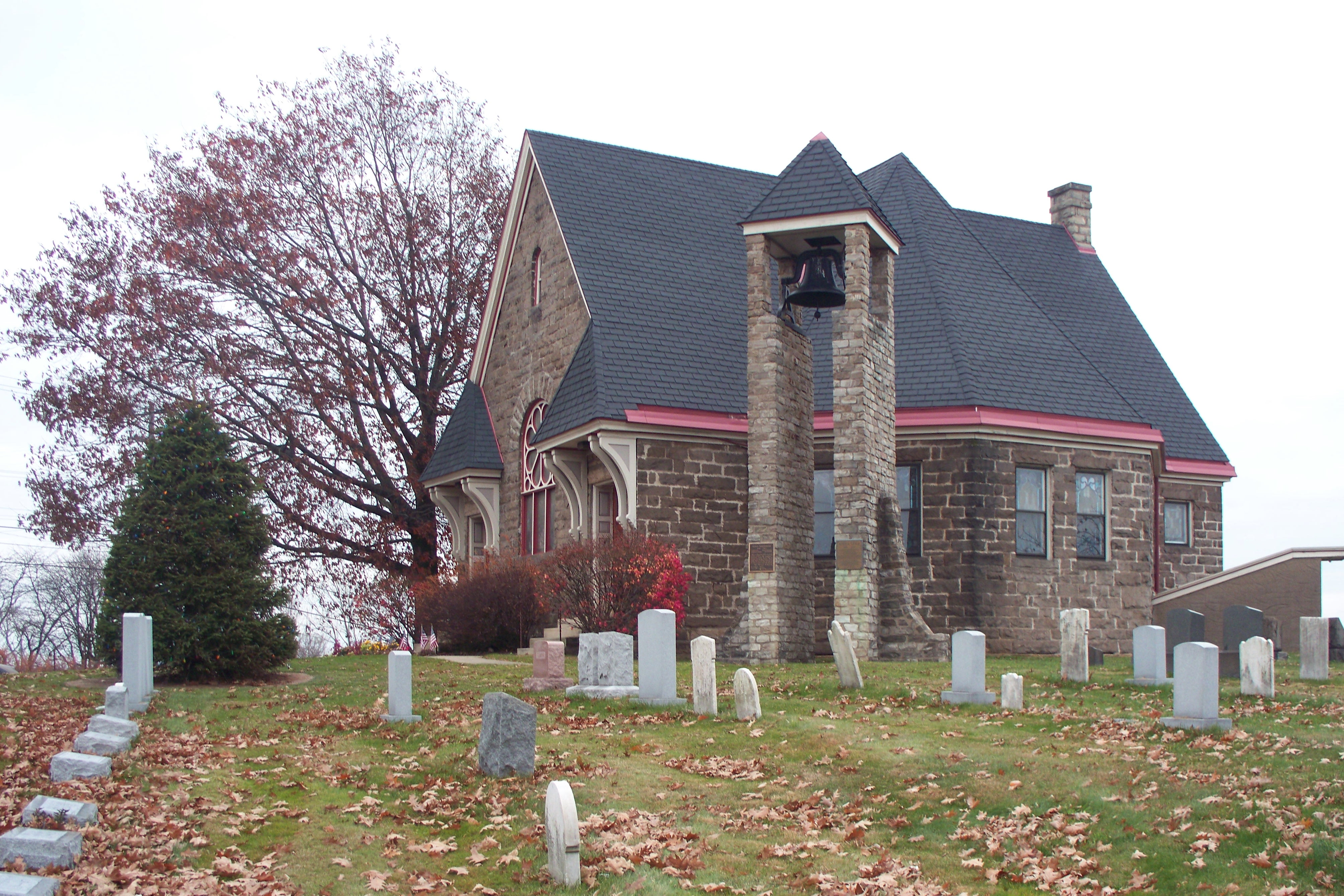
The Old Stone Church, now overseen by the Monroeville Historical Society

Monroeville is home to the Monroeville Mall and several office parks, and since the 1960s, has featured high-rise hotels. The Monroeville Convention Center, formerly known as the ExpoMart, is located near the mall. At its height in 1979, U.S. Steel's research laboratory in Monroeville employed nearly 1,800 people.

== Government and politics ==
Presidential Elections Results
Year	Republican	Democratic	Third Parties
2024	40% 6,779	58% 9,761	2% 271
2020	41% 7,019	57% 9,687	2% 245
2016	45% 6,795	53% 7,937	2% 244
2012	47% 6,830	52% 7,672	1% 142

As of 2026, the mayor of Monroeville is Dennis Biondo.

== Education ==
Students in Monroeville from kindergarten to grade 12 are served by the Gateway School District, a public school district with a student population of 3,800. Higher education is accessible via the Community College of Allegheny County's Boyce Campus and Indiana University of Pennsylvania's satellite facility in Penn Center East. The Western School of Health and Business - Monroeville is also located in Monroeville.

== Transportation ==
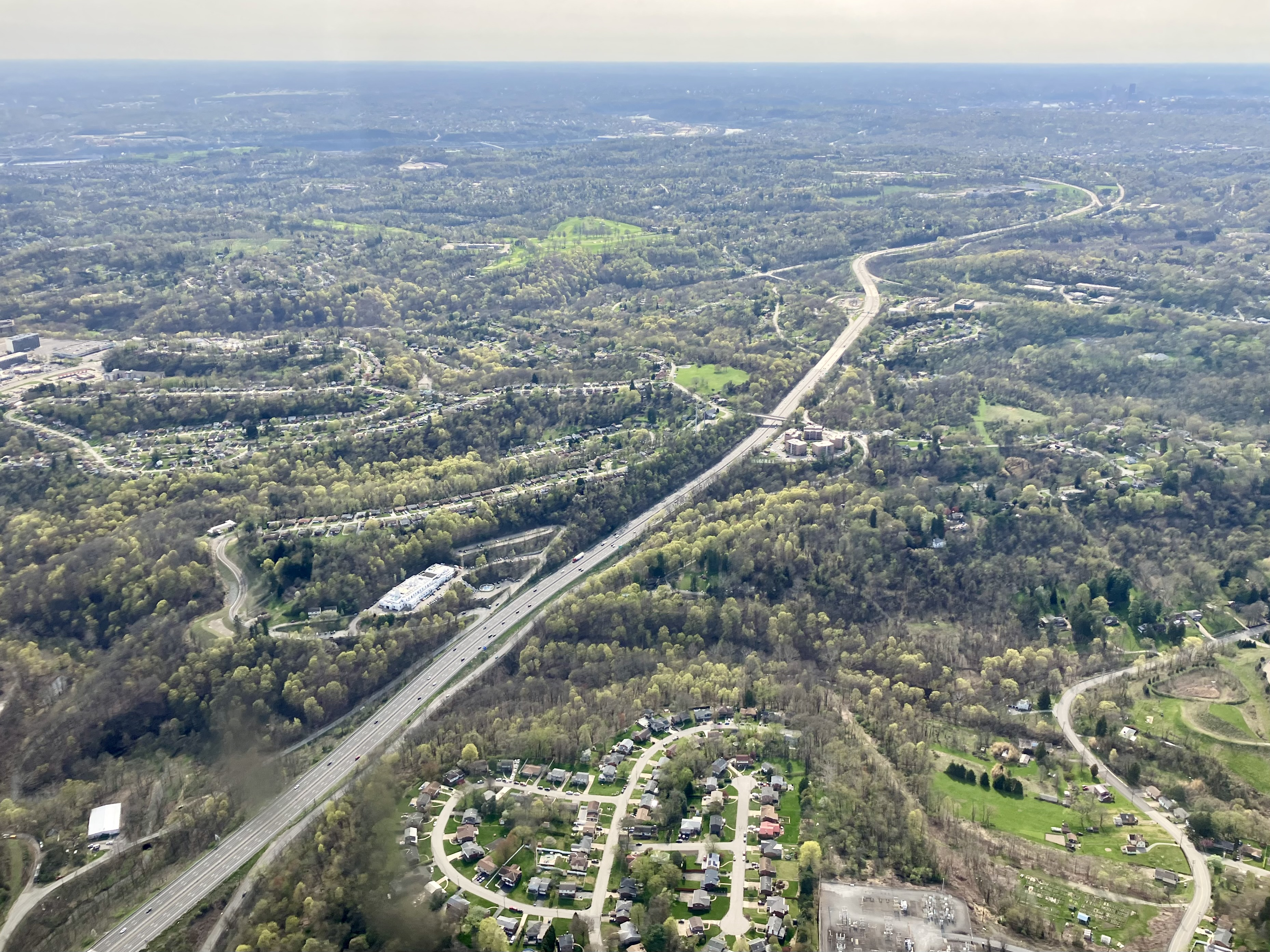
Interstate 376 goes through Monroeville

U.S. Route 22 ran through Monroeville as a substantial business route. When the Parkway East (I-376) was extended east to connect to the Pennsylvania Turnpike, U.S. 22 was shifted to that road, and the original U.S. 22 stretch of William Penn Highway became Business U.S. 22. Today, U.S. Route 22 runs through the municipality, serving as its main business district. This highway, along with the Pennsylvania Turnpike (Interstate 76), the eastern portion of the Penn-Lincoln Parkway (Interstate 376 concurrent with U.S. 22), U.S. Route 22 Business, and PA Route 48 intersect in Monroeville. Exit 57 (old Exit 6) of the Pennsylvania Turnpike is in Monroeville, with its interchange to Interstate 376. U.S. Route 22 also has an interchange with PA Route 286, which serves the northeastern part of the municipality.

Pittsburgh–Monroeville Airport, also called Harold W. Brown Memorial Field, was a private airport at 40.452290°N 79.774768°W. The airport has a single paved runway of 2,280 feet (690 m).

Two bus lines of the Pittsburgh Regional Transit offer service to downtown Pittsburgh, which maintains several park-and-ride lots located in Monroeville for bus commuters to Pittsburgh.

Passenger rail service by Amtrak's Pennsylvanian passes through once daily in each direction on the Pittsburgh Line, but does not call in Monroeville. Many freight trains arrive via the same track to Norfolk Southern's Pitcairn Intermodal Terminal, which straddles the Monreoville-North Versailles border in the Turtle Creek Valley. U. S. Steel's Union Railroad runs along its own track through the Thompson Run Valley between Wilkins Township and Monroeville, where it has one of its facilities.

The Westmoreland Heritage Trail is a rail-trail that connects cyclists and pedestrians in Monroeville to neighboring Trafford and Murrysville along the right-of-way where the Turtle Creek Industrial Railroad once ran.

== In popular culture ==
- In the NBC television show Scrubs, Dr. Robert 'Bob' Kelso claims that his family, then named Kelsonovich, settled in Monroeville.
- The My Chemical Romance song "Early Sunsets Over Monroeville" from their debut album I Brought You My Bullets, You Brought Me Your Love (2002) was inspired by the classic George A. Romero horror film, Dawn of the Dead. In the film, the protagonists find reprieve from the zombie apocalypse by shutting themselves into Monroeville Mall.
- The 2008 movie Zack and Miri Make a Porno, directed by Kevin Smith, is set in Monroeville. Filming was done at the Monroeville Mall and Monroeville Municipal Building. The film features a fictional recreational hockey team named the Monroeville Zombies, a reference to the George A. Romero film.

== Notable people ==
- Andy Dick, comedian, resided in Monroeville in his teenaged years
- Frank Fox, racing driver
- Roger Kingdom, Olympic gold medalist
- Gene Ludwig, jazz organist
- Marilyn Suzanne Miller, writer; graduated from Gateway High School in 1967.

== See also ==
- Monroeville Public Library
