= Pennsylvania House of Representatives, District 50 =

American legislative district

Pennsylvania's 50th State House of Representatives district
Representative
Bud Cook; R–West Pike Run Township
- Population (2022): 66,562

The 50th Pennsylvania House of Representatives District is located in southwest Pennsylvania and has been represented by Bud Cook since 2023.

== District profile ==
The 50th Pennsylvania House of Representatives District is located in Washington County and all of Greene County and includes the following areas:

Greene County

Washington County

- Allenport
- Beallsville
- Bentleyville
- California
- Centerville
- Charleroi
- Coal Center
- Cokeburg
- Deemston
- Dunlevy
- East Bethlehem Township
- Elco
- Ellsworth
- Long Branch
- Marianna
- North Bethlehem Township
- North Charleroi
- Roscoe
- Speers
- Stockdale
- Twilight
- West Bethlehem Township
- West Brownsville
- West Pike Run Township

== Representatives ==
Representative	Party	Years	District home	Note
Prior to 1969, seats were apportioned by county.
Russell Headlee	Democrat	1969 – 1970		
Ben L. Parker	Democrat	1971 – 1972		
Donald M. Davis	Democrat	1973 – 1976		Died on October 23, 1976
H. William DeWeese	Democrat	1976 – 2012	Waynesburg	Elected in 1976 special election. Resigned on April 24, 2012.
Pam Snyder	Democrat	2013 – 2022	Jefferson	
Bud Cook	Republican	2023 – present	Jefferson	Redistricted from 49th District

== Recent election results ==
PA House election, 2024: Pennsylvania House, District 50
Party	Candidate	Votes	%
Republican	Bud Cook (incumbent)	20,424	69.11
Democratic	Drew Ross Manko	9,131	30.89
Total votes		29,555	100.00
Republican hold			

PA House election, 2022: Pennsylvania House, District 50
Party	Candidate	Votes	%
Republican	Bud Cook (incumbent)	15,003	61.95
Democratic	Doug Mason	9,216	38.05
Total votes		24,219	100.00
Republican gain from Democratic			

PA House election, 2020: Pennsylvania House, District 50
Party	Candidate	Votes	%
Democratic	Pam Snyder (incumbent)	14,587	53.27
Republican	Larry Yost II	12,796	46.73
Total votes		27,383	100.00
Democratic hold			

PA House election, 2018: Pennsylvania House, District 50
Party	Candidate	Votes	%
Democratic	Pam Snyder (incumbent)	10,906	56.73
Republican	Betsy Rohanna McClure	8,318	43.27
Total votes		19,224	100.00
Democratic hold			

PA House election, 2016: Pennsylvania House, District 50
Party	Candidate	Votes	%
Democratic	Pam Snyder (incumbent)	13,044	53.33
Republican	Betsy Rohanna McClure	11,417	46.67
Total votes		24,461	100.00
Democratic hold			
