= List of towns and boroughs in Pennsylvania =

This is a list of towns and boroughs in Pennsylvania. There are currently 954 municipalities classified as boroughs and one classified as a town (Pennsylvania German: Schtettlin or Schdeddlin, singular Schtettel or Schteddel) in Pennsylvania. Unlike other forms of municipalities in Pennsylvania, boroughs and towns are not classified according to population.

Boroughs designated in the table below with a dagger (†) are home rule municipalities and are also found in the List of Pennsylvania municipalities and counties with home rule charters, optional charters, or optional plans. The state classifies these as boroughs for certain purposes, even though they do not operate under the Borough Code in Pennsylvania Law and may not contain the word "Borough" in their corporate names. Home rule municipalities that are styled as towns but classified as townships are not included in this list.

In addition, two boroughs, Quakertown and Weatherly, have adopted optional plans, which allow them to change their form of local government but do not significantly change those boroughs' relationships with the state.

== Town ==
Name	County
Bloomsburg	Columbia

== Boroughs ==
† Home rule municipality

Name	County/ies
Abbottstown	Adams
Adamsburg	Westmoreland
Adamstown	Berks; Lancaster
Addison	Somerset
Akron	Lancaster
Alba	Bradford
Albion	Erie
Alburtis	Lehigh
Aldan	Delaware
Alexandria	Huntingdon
Allenport	Washington
Ambler	Montgomery
Ambridge	Beaver
Apollo	Armstrong
Applewold	Armstrong
Archbald	Lackawanna
Arendtsville	Adams
Armagh	Indiana
Arona	Westmoreland
Ashland	Columbia; Schuylkill
Ashley	Luzerne
Ashville	Cambria
Aspinwall	Allegheny
Atglen	Chester
Athens	Bradford
Atwood	Armstrong
Auburn	Schuylkill
Austin	Potter
Avalon	Allegheny
Avis	Clinton
Avoca	Luzerne
Avondale	Chester
Avonmore	Westmoreland
Baden	Beaver
Baldwin	Allegheny
Bally	Berks
Bangor	Northampton
Barkeyville	Venango
Bath	Northampton
Beallsville	Washington
Bear Creek Village	Luzerne
Bear Lake	Warren
Beaver	Beaver
Beaver Meadows	Carbon
Beavertown	Snyder
Bechtelsville	Berks
Bedford	Bedford
Beech Creek	Clinton
Bell Acres	Allegheny
Belle Vernon	Fayette
Bellefonte	Centre
Bellevue†	Allegheny
Bellwood	Blair
Ben Avon	Allegheny
Ben Avon Heights	Allegheny
Bendersville	Adams
Benson	Somerset
Bentleyville	Washington
Benton	Columbia
Berlin	Somerset
Bernville	Berks
Berrysburg	Dauphin
Berwick	Columbia
Bessemer	Lawrence
Bethany	Wayne
Bethel Park†	Allegheny
Big Beaver	Beaver
Biglerville	Adams
Big Run	Jefferson
Birdsboro	Berks
Birmingham	Huntingdon
Blain	Perry
Blairsville	Indiana
Blakely	Lackawanna
Blawnox	Allegheny
Bloomfield	Perry
Blooming Valley	Crawford
Blossburg	Tioga
Bolivar	Westmoreland
Bonneauville	Adams
Boswell	Somerset
Bowmanstown	Carbon
Boyertown	Berks
Brackenridge	Allegheny
Braddock	Allegheny
Braddock Hills	Allegheny
Bradford Woods†	Allegheny
Brentwood	Allegheny
Briar Creek	Columbia
Bridgeport	Montgomery
Bridgeville	Allegheny
Bridgewater	Beaver
Brisbin	Clearfield
Bristol	Bucks
Broad Top City	Huntingdon
Brockway	Jefferson
Brookhaven	Delaware
Brookville	Jefferson
Brownstown	Cambria
Brownsville	Fayette
Bruin	Butler
Bryn Athyn†	Montgomery
Burgettstown	Washington
Burlington	Bradford
Burnham	Mifflin
Burnside	Clearfield
California	Washington
Callensburg	Clarion
Callery	Butler
Cambridge Springs†	Crawford
Camp Hill	Cumberland
Canonsburg	Washington
Canton	Bradford
Carlisle†	Cumberland
Carmichaels	Greene
Carnegie	Allegheny
Carrolltown	Cambria
Carroll Valley	Adams
Cassandra	Cambria
Casselman	Somerset
Cassville	Huntingdon
Castle Shannon	Allegheny
Catasauqua	Lehigh
Catawissa	Columbia
Centerport	Berks
Centerville	Crawford
Centerville	Washington
Central City	Somerset
Centralia	Columbia
Centre Hall	Centre
Chalfant	Allegheny
Chalfont†	Bucks
Chambersburg	Franklin
Chapman	Northampton
Charleroi	Washington
Cherry Tree	Indiana
Cherry Valley	Butler
Chester Heights	Delaware
Chester Hill	Clearfield
Chest Springs	Cambria
Cheswick	Allegheny
Chicora	Butler
Christiana	Lancaster
Churchill	Allegheny
Clarendon	Warren
Clarion	Clarion
Clark	Mercer
Clarks Green	Lackawanna
Clarks Summit	Lackawanna
Clarksville	Greene
Claysville	Washington
Clearfield	Clearfield
Cleona	Lebanon
Clifton Heights	Delaware
Clintonville	Venango
Clymer	Indiana
Coal Center	Washington
Coaldale	Bedford
Coaldale	Schuylkill
Coalmont	Huntingdon
Coalport	Clearfield
Cochranton	Crawford
Cokeburg	Washington
Collegeville	Montgomery
Collingdale	Delaware
Columbia	Lancaster
Colwyn	Delaware
Confluence	Somerset
Conneaut Lake	Crawford
Conneautville	Crawford
Connoquenessing	Butler
Conshohocken	Montgomery
Conway	Beaver
Conyngham	Luzerne
Coopersburg	Lehigh
Cooperstown	Venango
Coplay	Lehigh
Coraopolis	Allegheny
Cornwall	Lebanon
Corsica	Jefferson
Coudersport	Potter
Courtdale	Luzerne
Crafton	Allegheny
Cranesville	Erie
Creekside	Indiana
Cresson	Cambria
Cressona	Schuylkill
Cross Roads	York
Curwensville	Clearfield
Daisytown	Cambria
Dale	Cambria
Dallas	Luzerne
Dallastown	York
Dalton	Lackawanna
Danville	Montour
Darby	Delaware
Darlington	Beaver
Dauphin	Dauphin
Dawson	Fayette
Dayton	Armstrong
Deemston	Washington
Deer Lake	Schuylkill
Delaware Water Gap	Monroe
Delmont	Westmoreland
Delta	York
Denver	Lancaster
Derry	Westmoreland
Dickson City	Lackawanna
Dillsburg	York
Donegal	Westmoreland
Donora	Washington
Dormont	Allegheny
Dover	York
Downingtown	Chester
Doylestown	Bucks
Dravosburg	Allegheny
Driftwood	Cameron
Dublin	Bucks
Duboistown	Lycoming
Dudley	Huntingdon
Dunbar	Fayette
Duncannon	Perry
Duncansville	Blair
Dunlevy	Washington
Dunmore	Lackawanna
Dupont	Luzerne
Duryea	Luzerne
Dushore	Sullivan
Eagles Mere	Sullivan
East Bangor	Northampton
East Berlin	Adams
East Brady	Clarion
East Butler	Butler
East Conemaugh	Cambria
East Greenville	Montgomery
East Lansdowne	Delaware
East McKeesport	Allegheny
East Petersburg	Lancaster
East Pittsburgh	Allegheny
East Prospect	York
East Rochester	Beaver
East Side	Carbon
East Stroudsburg	Monroe
East Vandergrift	Westmoreland
East Washington	Washington
Eastvale	Beaver
Eau Claire	Butler
Ebensburg	Cambria
Economy	Beaver
Eddystone	Delaware
Edgewood	Allegheny
Edinboro†	Erie
Edgeworth	Allegheny
Edwardsville	Luzerne
Ehrenfeld	Cambria
Elco	Washington
Elderton	Armstrong
Eldred	McKean
Elgin	Erie
Elizabeth	Allegheny
Elizabethtown	Lancaster
Elizabethville	Dauphin
Elkland	Tioga
Ellport	Lawrence
Ellsworth	Washington
Ellwood City	Beaver; Lawrence
Elverson	Chester
Emlenton	Clarion; Venango
Emmaus	Lehigh
Emporium	Cameron
Emsworth	Allegheny
Enon Valley	Lawrence
Ephrata	Lancaster
Ernest	Indiana
Etna	Allegheny
Evans City	Butler
Everett	Bedford
Everson	Fayette
Exeter	Luzerne
Export	Westmoreland
Factoryville	Wyoming
Fairchance	Fayette
Fairfield	Adams
Fairview	Butler
Falls Creek	Jefferson
Fallston	Beaver
Fawn Grove	York
Fayette City	Fayette
Felton	York
Ferndale	Cambria
Finleyville	Washington
Fleetwood	Berks
Flemington	Clinton
Folcroft	Delaware
Ford City	Armstrong
Ford Cliff	Armstrong
Forest City	Susquehanna
Forest Hills	Allegheny
Forksville	Sullivan
Forty Fort	Luzerne
Fountain Hill	Lehigh
Fox Chapel	Allegheny
Foxburg	Clarion
Frackville	Schuylkill
Frankfort Springs	Beaver
Franklin	Cambria
Franklin Park	Allegheny
Franklintown	York
Fredonia	Mercer
Freeburg	Snyder
Freedom	Beaver
Freeland	Luzerne
Freemansburg	Northampton
Freeport	Armstrong
Friendsville	Susquehanna
Galeton	Potter
Gallitzin	Cambria
Garrett	Somerset
Geistown	Cambria
Georgetown	Beaver
Gettysburg	Adams
Gilberton	Schuylkill
Girard	Erie
Girardville	Schuylkill
Glasgow	Beaver
Glassport	Allegheny
Glen Campbell	Indiana
Glen Hope	Clearfield
Glen Osborne	Allegheny
Glen Rock	York
Glendon	Northampton
Glenfield	Allegheny
Glenolden	Delaware
Goldsboro	York
Gordon	Schuylkill
Grampian	Clearfield
Gratz	Dauphin
Great Bend	Susquehanna
Green Hills	Washington
Green Lane	Montgomery
Green Tree†	Allegheny
Greencastle	Franklin
Greensboro	Greene
Greenville†	Mercer
Grove City	Mercer
Halifax	Dauphin
Hallam	York
Hallstead	Susquehanna
Hamburg	Berks
Hanover	York
Harmony	Butler
Harrisville	Butler
Hartleton	Union
Harveys Lake	Luzerne
Hastings	Cambria
Hatboro	Montgomery
Hatfield	Montgomery
Hawley	Wayne
Hawthorn	Clarion
Haysville	Allegheny
Heidelberg	Allegheny
Hellertown	Northampton
Herndon	Northumberland
Highspire	Dauphin
Hollidaysburg	Blair
Homer City	Indiana
Homestead	Allegheny
Homewood	Beaver
Honesdale	Wayne
Honey Brook	Chester
Hookstown	Beaver
Hooversville	Somerset
Hop Bottom	Susquehanna
Hopewell	Bedford
Houston	Washington
Houtzdale	Clearfield
Howard	Centre
Hughestown	Luzerne
Hughesville	Lycoming
Hulmeville	Bucks
Hummelstown	Dauphin
Hunker	Westmoreland
Huntingdon	Huntingdon
Hyde Park	Westmoreland
Hydetown	Crawford
Hyndman	Bedford
Indian Lake	Somerset
Indiana	Indiana
Industry	Beaver
Ingram	Allegheny
Irvona	Clearfield
Irwin	Westmoreland
Ivyland	Bucks
Jackson Center	Mercer
Jacobus	York
Jamestown	Mercer
Jeddo	Luzerne
Jefferson	Greene
Jefferson	York
Jefferson Hills	Allegheny
Jenkintown	Montgomery
Jennerstown	Somerset
Jermyn	Lackawanna
Jersey Shore	Lycoming
Jessup	Lackawanna
Jim Thorpe	Carbon
Johnsonburg	Elk
Jonestown	Lebanon
Juniata Terrace	Mifflin
Kane	McKean
Karns City	Butler
Kenhorst	Berks
Kennett Square	Chester
Kingston†	Luzerne
Kistler	Mifflin
Kittanning	Armstrong
Knox	Clarion
Knoxville	Tioga
Koppel	Beaver
Kulpmont	Northumberland
Kutztown	Berks
Laceyville	Wyoming
Laflin	Luzerne
Lake City	Erie
Landingville	Schuylkill
Landisburg	Perry
Lanesboro	Susquehanna
Langhorne	Bucks
Langhorne Manor	Bucks
Lansdale	Montgomery
Lansdowne	Delaware
Lansford	Carbon
Laporte	Sullivan
Larksville	Luzerne
Latrobe†	Westmoreland
Laurel Mountain	Westmoreland
Laurel Run	Luzerne
Laureldale	Berks
Lawrenceville	Tioga
Le Raysville	Bradford
Leechburg	Armstrong
Leesport	Berks
Leetsdale	Allegheny
Lehighton	Carbon
Lemoyne	Cumberland
Lenhartsville	Berks
Lewis Run	McKean
Lewisberry	York
Lewisburg	Union
Lewistown	Mifflin
Liberty	Allegheny
Liberty	Tioga
Ligonier	Westmoreland
Lilly	Cambria
Lincoln	Allegheny
Linesville	Crawford
Lititz	Lancaster
Little Meadows	Susquehanna
Littlestown	Adams
Liverpool	Perry
Loganton	Clinton
Loganville	York
Long Branch	Washington
Lorain	Cambria
Loretto	Cambria
Luzerne	Luzerne
Lykens	Dauphin
Lyons	Berks
Macungie	Lehigh
Madison	Westmoreland
Mahaffey	Clearfield
Mahanoy City	Schuylkill
Malvern†	Chester
Manchester	York
Manheim	Lancaster
Manns Choice	Bedford
Manor	Westmoreland
Manorville	Armstrong
Mansfield	Tioga
Mapleton	Huntingdon
Marcus Hook	Delaware
Marianna	Washington
Marietta	Lancaster
Marion Center	Indiana
Marion Heights	Northumberland
Marklesburg	Huntingdon
Markleysburg	Fayette
Mars	Butler
Martinsburg	Blair
Marysville	Perry
Masontown	Fayette
Matamoras	Pike
Mayfield	Lackawanna
McAdoo	Schuylkill
McClure	Snyder
McConnellsburg	Fulton
McDonald	Allegheny; Washington
McEwensville	Northumberland
McKean	Erie
McKees Rocks	Allegheny
McSherrystown	Adams
McVeytown	Mifflin
Mechanicsburg	Cumberland
Mechanicsville	Schuylkill
Media	Delaware
Mercer	Mercer
Mercersburg	Franklin
Meshoppen	Wyoming
Meyersdale	Somerset
Middleburg	Snyder
Middleport	Schuylkill
Middletown	Dauphin
Midland	Beaver
Midway	Washington
Mifflin	Juniata
Mifflinburg	Union
Mifflintown	Juniata
Milesburg	Centre
Milford	Pike
Mill Creek	Huntingdon
Mill Hall	Clinton
Mill Village	Erie
Millbourne	Delaware
Millersburg	Dauphin
Millerstown	Perry
Millersville	Lancaster
Millheim	Centre
Millvale	Allegheny
Millville	Columbia
Milton	Northumberland
Minersville	Schuylkill
Modena	Chester
Mohnton	Berks
Monaca	Beaver
Monroe	Bradford
Monroeville†	Allegheny
Mont Alto	Franklin
Montgomery	Lycoming
Montoursville	Lycoming
Montrose	Susquehanna
Moosic	Lackawanna
Morrisville	Bucks
Morton	Delaware
Moscow	Lackawanna
Mount Carbon	Schuylkill
Mount Carmel	Northumberland
Mount Gretna	Lebanon
Mount Holly Springs	Cumberland
Mount Jewett	McKean
Mount Joy	Lancaster
Mount Oliver	Allegheny
Mount Penn	Berks
Mount Pleasant	Westmoreland
Mount Pocono	Monroe
Mount Union	Huntingdon
Mount Wolf	York
Mountville	Lancaster
Muncy	Lycoming
Munhall	Allegheny
Murrysville†	Westmoreland
Myerstown	Lebanon
Nanty-Glo	Cambria
Narberth	Montgomery
Nazareth	Northampton
Nescopeck	Luzerne
Nesquehoning	Carbon
New Albany	Bradford
New Alexandria	Westmoreland
New Baltimore	Somerset
New Beaver	Lawrence
New Berlin	Union
New Bethlehem	Clarion
New Brighton	Beaver
New Britain	Bucks
New Buffalo	Perry
New Centerville	Somerset
New Columbus	Luzerne
New Cumberland	Cumberland
New Eagle	Washington
New Florence	Westmoreland
New Freedom	York
New Galilee	Beaver
New Holland	Lancaster
New Hope	Bucks
New Lebanon	Mercer
New Milford	Susquehanna
New Morgan	Berks
New Oxford	Adams
New Paris	Bedford
New Philadelphia	Schuylkill
New Ringgold	Schuylkill
New Salem	York
New Stanton	Westmoreland
New Washington	Clearfield
New Wilmington	Lawrence
Newburg	Clearfield
Newburg	Cumberland
Newell	Fayette
Newport	Perry
Newry	Blair
Newton Hamilton	Mifflin
Newtown	Bucks
Newville	Cumberland
Nicholson	Wyoming
Norristown†	Montgomery
North Apollo	Armstrong
North Belle Vernon	Westmoreland
North Braddock	Allegheny
North Catasauqua	Northampton
North Charleroi	Washington
North East	Erie
North Irwin	Westmoreland
North Wales	Montgomery
North York	York
Northampton	Northampton
Northern Cambria	Cambria
Northumberland	Northumberland
Norwood	Delaware
Nuangola	Luzerne
Oakdale	Allegheny
Oakland	Susquehanna
Oakmont	Allegheny
Ohiopyle	Fayette
Ohioville	Beaver
Oklahoma	Westmoreland
Old Forge	Lackawanna
Olyphant	Lackawanna
Orangeville	Columbia
Orbisonia	Huntingdon
Orrstown	Franklin
Orwigsburg	Schuylkill
Osceola Mills	Clearfield
Oswayo	Potter
Oxford	Chester
Paint	Somerset
Palmerton	Carbon
Palmyra	Lebanon
Palo Alto	Schuylkill
Parkesburg	Chester
Parkside	Delaware
Parryville	Carbon
Patterson Heights	Beaver
Patton	Cambria
Paxtang	Dauphin
Pen Argyl	Northampton
Penbrook	Dauphin
Penn	Westmoreland
Penn Lake Park	Luzerne
Penndel	Bucks
Pennsburg	Montgomery
Pennsbury Village	Allegheny
Perkasie	Bucks
Perryopolis	Fayette
Petersburg	Huntingdon
Petrolia	Butler
Philipsburg	Centre
Phoenixville	Chester
Picture Rocks	Lycoming
Pillow	Dauphin
Pine Grove	Schuylkill
Pitcairn	Allegheny
Platea	Erie
Pleasant Hills	Allegheny
Pleasantville	Bedford
Pleasantville	Venango
Plum	Allegheny
Plumville	Indiana
Plymouth	Luzerne
Point Marion	Fayette
Polk	Venango
Port Allegany	McKean
Port Carbon	Schuylkill
Port Clinton	Schuylkill
Port Matilda	Centre
Port Royal	Juniata
Port Vue	Allegheny
Portage†	Cambria
Portersville	Butler
Portland	Northampton
Pottstown	Montgomery
Pringle	Luzerne
Prompton	Wayne
Prospect	Butler
Prospect Park	Delaware
Punxsutawney	Jefferson
Quakertown	Bucks
Quarryville	Lancaster
Railroad	York
Rainsburg	Bedford
Ramey	Clearfield
Rankin	Allegheny
Red Hill	Montgomery
Red Lion	York
Renovo	Clinton
Reynoldsville	Jefferson
Rices Landing	Greene
Richland	Lebanon
Richlandtown	Bucks
Ridgway	Elk
Ridley Park	Delaware
Riegelsville	Bucks
Rimersburg	Clarion
Ringtown	Schuylkill
Riverside	Northumberland
Roaring Spring	Blair
Robesonia	Berks
Rochester	Beaver
Rockhill	Huntingdon
Rockledge	Montgomery
Rockwood	Somerset
Rome	Bradford
Roscoe	Washington
Rose Valley	Delaware
Roseto	Northampton
Roseville	Tioga
Rosslyn Farms	Allegheny
Rouseville	Venango
Royalton	Dauphin
Royersford	Montgomery
Rural Valley	Armstrong
Rutledge	Delaware
S.N.P.J.	Lawrence
Saegertown	Crawford
Salisbury	Somerset
Salladasburg	Lycoming
Saltillo	Huntingdon
Saltsburg	Indiana
Sandy Lake	Mercer
Sankertown	Cambria
Saxonburg	Butler
Saxton	Bedford
Sayre	Bradford
Scalp Level	Cambria
Schellsburg	Bedford
Schuylkill Haven	Schuylkill
Schwenksville	Montgomery
Scottdale	Westmoreland
Selinsgrove	Snyder
Sellersville	Bucks
Seven Fields	Butler
Seven Springs	Fayette; Somerset
Seven Valleys	York
Seward	Westmoreland
Sewickley	Allegheny
Sewickley Heights	Allegheny
Sewickley Hills	Allegheny
Shade Gap	Huntingdon
Shamokin Dam	Snyder
Shanksville	Somerset
Sharon Hill	Delaware
Sharpsburg	Allegheny
Sharpsville	Mercer
Sheakleyville	Mercer
Shelocta	Indiana
Shenandoah	Schuylkill
Shickshinny	Luzerne
Shillington	Berks
Shinglehouse	Potter
Shippensburg	Cumberland; Franklin
Shippenville	Clarion
Shippingport	Beaver
Shiremanstown	Cumberland
Shirleysburg	Huntingdon
Shoemakersville	Berks
Shrewsbury	York
Silverdale	Bucks
Sinking Spring	Berks
Slatington	Lehigh
Sligo	Clarion
Slippery Rock	Butler
Smethport	McKean
Smicksburg	Indiana
Smithfield	Fayette
Smithton	Westmoreland
Snow Shoe	Centre
Snydertown	Northumberland
Somerset	Somerset
Souderton	Montgomery
South Bethlehem	Armstrong
South Coatesville	Chester
South Connellsville	Fayette
South Fork	Cambria
South Greensburg	Westmoreland
South Heights	Beaver
South Renovo	Clinton
South Waverly	Bradford
South Williamsport	Lycoming
Southmont	Cambria
Southwest Greensburg	Westmoreland
Spartansburg	Crawford
Speers	Washington
Spring City	Chester
Spring Grove	York
Springboro	Crawford
Springdale	Allegheny
St. Clair	Schuylkill
St. Clairsville	Bedford
St. Lawrence	Berks
St. Petersburg	Clarion
State College†	Centre
Starrucca	Wayne
Steelton	Dauphin
Stewartstown	York
Stillwater	Columbia
Stockdale	Washington
Stockertown	Northampton
Stoneboro	Mercer
Stoystown	Somerset
Strasburg	Lancaster
Strattanville	Clarion
Stroudsburg	Monroe
Sugar Grove	Warren
Sugar Notch	Luzerne
Sugarcreek	Venango
Summerhill	Cambria
Summerville	Jefferson
Summit Hill	Carbon
Susquehanna Depot	Susquehanna
Sutersville	Westmoreland
Swarthmore	Delaware
Swissvale	Allegheny
Swoyersville	Luzerne
Sykesville	Jefferson
Sylvania	Bradford
Tamaqua	Schuylkill
Tarentum	Allegheny
Tatamy	Northampton
Taylor	Lackawanna
Telford	Bucks; Montgomery
Terre Hill	Lancaster
Thompson	Susquehanna
Thompsontown	Juniata
Thornburg	Allegheny
Three Springs	Huntingdon
Throop	Lackawanna
Tidioute	Warren
Timblin	Jefferson
Tioga	Tioga
Tionesta	Forest
Topton	Berks
Towanda	Bradford
Tower City	Schuylkill
Townville	Crawford
Trafford	Allegheny; Westmoreland
Trainer	Delaware
Trappe	Montgomery
Tremont	Schuylkill
Troutville	Clearfield
Troy	Bradford
Trumbauersville	Bucks
Tullytown	Bucks
Tunkhannock	Wyoming
Tunnelhill	Blair; Cambria
Turbotville	Northumberland
Turtle Creek	Allegheny
Twilight	Washington
Tyrone†	Blair
Ulysses	Potter
Union City	Erie
Union Dale	Susquehanna
Unionville	Centre
Upland	Delaware
Ursina	Somerset
Utica	Venango
Valencia	Butler
Valley-Hi	Fulton
Vanderbilt	Fayette
Vandergrift	Westmoreland
Vandling	Lackawanna
Venango	Crawford
Verona	Allegheny
Versailles	Allegheny
Vintondale	Cambria
Volant	Lawrence
Wall	Allegheny
Wallaceton	Clearfield
Walnutport	Northampton
Wampum	Lawrence
Warrior Run	Luzerne
Washingtonville	Montour
Waterford	Erie
Watsontown	Northumberland
Wattsburg	Erie
Waymart	Wayne
Waynesboro	Franklin
Waynesburg	Greene
Weatherly	Carbon
Weissport	Carbon
Wellersburg	Somerset
Wellsboro	Tioga
Wellsville	York
Wernersville	Berks
Wesleyville	Erie
West Brownsville	Washington
West Chester†	Chester
West Conshohocken	Montgomery
West Easton	Northampton
West Elizabeth	Allegheny
West Grove	Chester
West Hazleton	Luzerne
West Homestead	Allegheny
West Kittanning	Armstrong
West Leechburg	Westmoreland
West Liberty	Butler
West Mayfield	Beaver
West Middlesex	Mercer
West Middletown	Washington
West Mifflin	Allegheny
West Newton	Westmoreland
West Pittston	Luzerne
West Reading	Berks
West Sunbury	Butler
West View	Allegheny
West Wyoming	Luzerne
West York	York
Westfield	Tioga
Westmont	Cambria
Westover	Clearfield
Whitaker	Allegheny
White Haven	Luzerne
White Oak	Allegheny
Whitehall†	Allegheny
Wilkinsburg	Allegheny
Williamsburg	Blair
Williamstown	Dauphin
Wilmerding	Allegheny
Wilmore	Cambria
Wilson	Northampton
Wind Gap	Northampton
Windber	Somerset
Windsor	York
Winterstown	York
Womelsdorf	Berks
Woodbury	Bedford
Woodcock	Crawford
Wormleysburg	Cumberland
Worthington	Armstrong
Worthville	Jefferson
Wrightsville	York
Wyalusing	Bradford
Wyoming	Luzerne
Wyomissing	Berks
Yardley	Bucks
Yatesville	Luzerne
Yeadon	Delaware
Yoe	York
York Haven	York
York Springs	Adams
Yorkana	York
Youngstown	Westmoreland
Youngsville†	Warren
Youngwood	Westmoreland
Zelienople	Butler

== See also ==
- List of cities in Pennsylvania
- List of counties in Pennsylvania
- List of municipalities in Pennsylvania
- List of Pennsylvania Municipalities and Counties with Home Rule Charters, Optional Charters, or Optional Plans
- List of townships in Pennsylvania
