= California Area School District =

School district in Pennsylvania

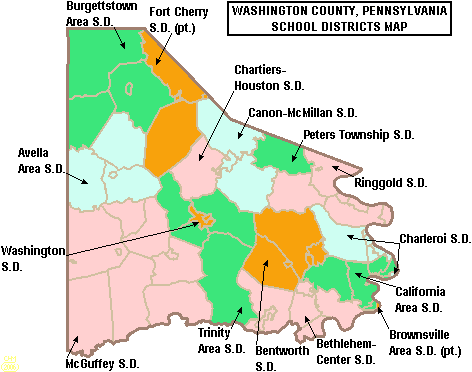

Address
- 11 Trojan Way Coal Center, Pennsylvania, 15419; United States

District information
- Type: Public

Other information
- Website: www.calsd.org

The California Area School District is a small public school district serving the boroughs of Allenport, California, Coal Center, Elco, Long Branch and Roscoe and West Pike Run Township in Washington County, Pennsylvania. A portion of the borough of West Brownsville is also within the district's boundaries. The district was formed in 1948 with the jointure of the California Community School District and the East Pike Run Township School District. For a few years in the early 1950s California Area was in a jointure with Centerville Schools, with long-term plans to build a single high school, but Centerville withdrew from the jointure. California Area School District encompasses approximately thirty-five square miles (91 km^{2}). It is among the smallest districts in Pennsylvania. According to the 2000 federal census, it serves a resident population of 10,705. In 2009, the district residents' per capita income was $15,577, while the median family income was just $39,225. The district maintains a strong affiliation with California University of PA which includes a professional development program, as well as counselor and principal internships.

The district operates one high school (9th–12th) and one elementary/intermediate/middle school (K-8th).

== Extracurriculars ==
The district offers a variety of clubs, activities and sports. California competes in single A WPIAL sports which include baseball, basketball, football, soccer, tennis, track & field, and volleyball.
