= Art Koeninger =

American football player (1906–1990)

No. 26, 30, 24
- Positions: Center, guard

Personal information
- Born: November 1, 1906; Roscoe, Pennsylvania, U.S.
- Died: December 16, 1990 (aged 84); Chattanooga, Tennessee, U.S.
- Listed height: 6 ft 1 in (1.85 m)
- Listed weight: 202 lb (92 kg)

Career information
- High school: California (Coal Center, Pennsylvania)
- College: Chattanooga (1927–1930)

Career history
- Frankford Yellow Jackets (1931); Staten Island Stapletons (1932); Philadelphia Eagles (1933); Memphis Tigers (1934)
- Stats at Pro Football Reference

Arthur Frank Koeninger (November 1, 1906 – December 16, 1990) was an American professional football center who played three seasons in the National Football League (NFL) with the Frankford Yellow Jackets, Staten Island Stapletons and Philadelphia Eagles. He played college football at the University of Chattanooga.

== Early life and college ==
Arthur Frank Koeninger was born on November 1, 1906, in Roscoe, Pennsylvania. He attended California Area High School in Coal Center, Pennsylvania.

He was a member of the Chattanooga Moccasins of the University of Chattanooga from 1927 to 1930 and a two-year letterman from 1929 to 1930. He was inducted into the school's athletics hall of fame in 1987.

== Professional career ==
Koeninger signed with the Frankford Yellow Jackets of the National Football League (NFL) in 1931. He played in two games for the team during the 1931 season before being released.

Koeninger was signed by the Staten Island Stapletons of the NFL in 1932. He appeared in ten games, starting five, for the Stapletons during the 1932 season, catching one pass for 17 yards. He became a free agent after the season.

Koeninger signed with the NFL's Philadelphia Eagles in 1933 and played in one game, a start, during the team's inaugural 1933 season. He was released in 1933.

Koeninger played in nine games, starting six, for the Memphis Tigers of the American Football League in 1934.

== Personal life ==
Koeninger died on December 16, 1990, in Chattanooga, Tennessee.
