= Jefferson Township, Fayette County, Pennsylvania =

Township in Pennsylvania, US

Coordinates: 40°02′56″N 79°49′24″W

Jefferson Township
- Township
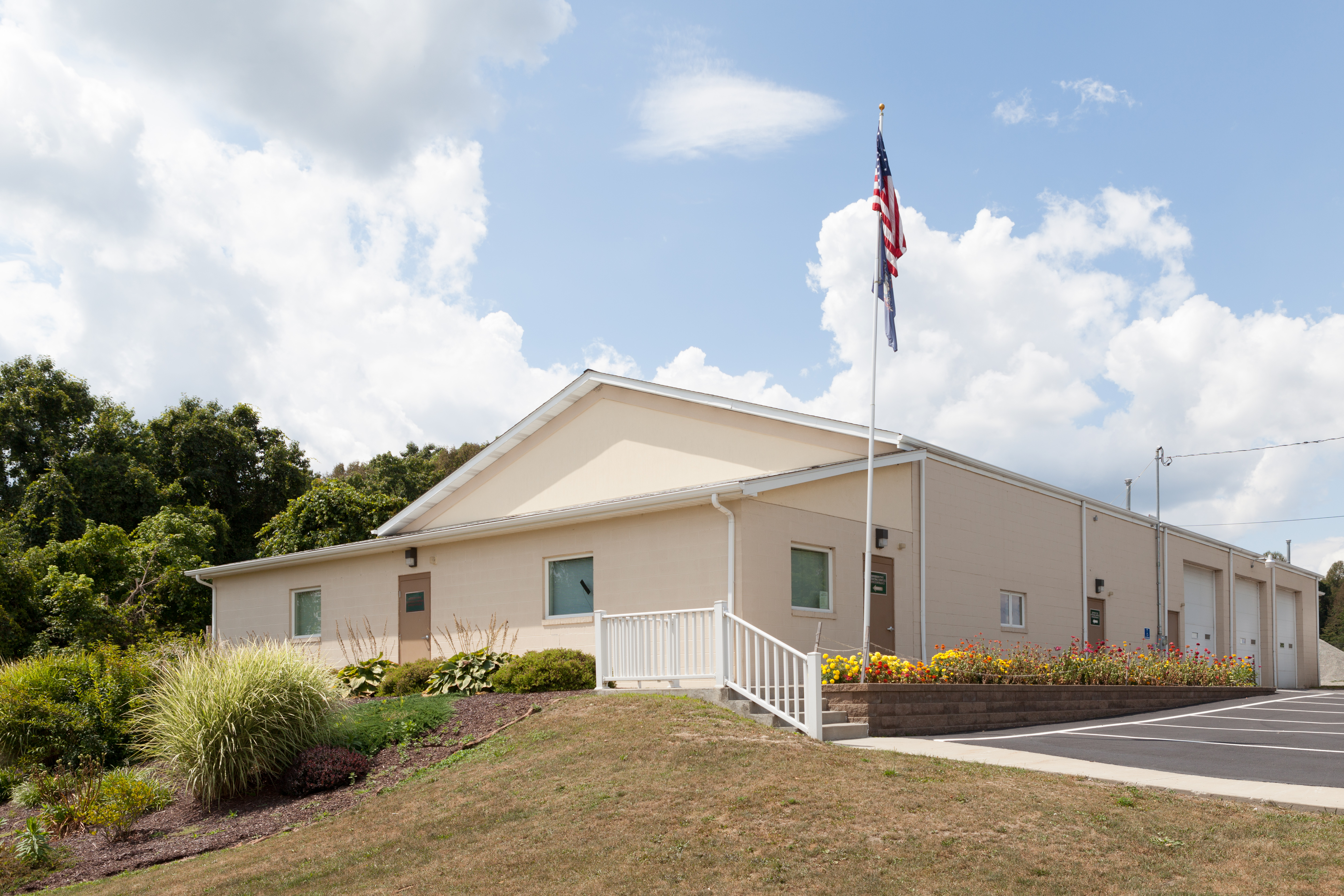
- Municipal complex
- Etymology: Thomas Jefferson
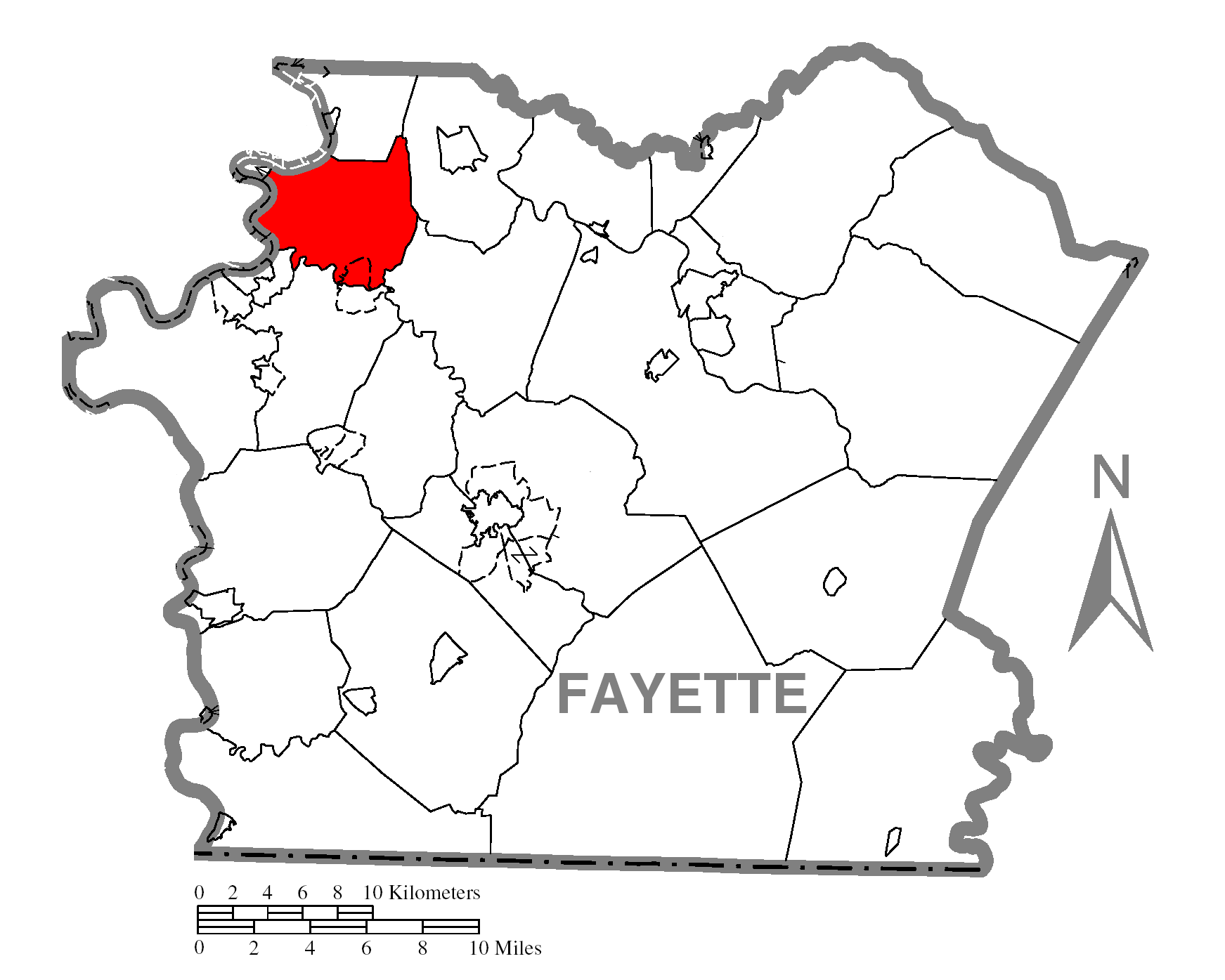
- Location of Jefferson Township in Fayette County

- Location of Fayette County in Pennsylvania
- Country: United States
- State: Pennsylvania
- County: Fayette

Area
  - Total: 20.35 sq mi (52.70 km^{2})
  - Land: 20.06 sq mi (51.96 km^{2})
  - Water: 0.29 sq mi (0.75 km^{2})

Population (2020)
  - Total: 2,007 ▼
  - Estimate (2022): 1,964
  - Density: 97.7/sq mi (37.74/km^{2})
- Time zone: UTC-4 (EST)
  - Summer (DST): UTC-5 (EDT)
- Area code: 724
- FIPS code: 42-051-37872

Jefferson Township is a township in Fayette County, Pennsylvania, United States. The population was 2,007 at the 2020 census, a decline from the figure of 2,008 tabulated in 2010. It is named for former president Thomas Jefferson, and many of the township's streets are named after other U.S. presidents. Frazier School District serves the area.

Redstone, Albany, Lowber, and Grindstone are located within the township.

== History ==
Located within Jefferson Township is a group of petroglyphs known as the Francis Farm Petroglyphs. As an archaeological site, they have been listed on the National Register of Historic Places.

=== Coal mining ===
Several coal mines were located around the township. CONSOL mines Alice, Colonial, and Lowber were all active mines in the area.

== Geography ==
The township is in northwestern Fayette County, bordered to the west by the Monongahela River and to the south by Redstone Creek. To the north is Washington Township, to the east are Perry and Franklin townships, to the south is Redstone Township, and to the southwest is Brownsville Township, all of which are in Fayette County. To the west, still in Fayette County, is the borough of Newell within a bend of the Monongahela, while to the west across the river are the boroughs of West Brownsville, California, Elco, Roscoe, Allenport, and Stockdale in Washington County.

According to the United States Census Bureau, Jefferson Township has a total area of 20.3 square miles (52.7 km^{2}), of which 20.1 square miles (52.0 km^{2}) is land and 0.3 square miles (0.7 km^{2}), or 1.41%, is water.

Pennsylvania Route 201 crosses the northeast part of the township, leading northwest to Fayette City and southeast to Connellsville.

== Demographics ==
Historical population
Census	Pop.	Note	%±
2010	2,015		—
2020	2,007		−0.4%
2022 (est.)	1,964		−2.1%
U.S. Decennial Census

As of the 2000 census, there were 2,259 people, 865 households, and 657 families residing in the township. The population density was 111.9 inhabitants per square mile (43.2/km^{2}). There were 900 housing units at an average density of 44.6 per square mile (17.2/km^{2}). The racial makeup of the township was 97.52% White, 1.55% African American, 0.04% Native American, 0.22% Asian, 0.04% from other races, and 0.62% from two or more races. Hispanic or Latino of any race were 0.44% of the population.

There were 865 households, out of which 30.8% had children under the age of 18 living with them, 61.7% were married couples living together, 9.8% had a female householder with no husband present, and 24.0% were non-families. 21.4% of all households were made up of individuals, and 12.4% had someone living alone who was 65 years of age or older. The average household size was 2.59 and the average family size was 2.99.

In the township the population was spread out, with 22.4% under the age of 18, 7.3% from 18 to 24, 27.0% from 25 to 44, 26.5% from 45 to 64, and 16.8% who were 65 years of age or older. The median age was 41 years. For every 100 females, there were 97.8 males. For every 100 females age 18 and over, there were 92.6 males.

The median income for a household in the township was $33,618, and the median income for a family was $40,900. Males had a median income of $32,455 versus $21,799 for females. The per capita income for the township was $15,669. About 11.6% of families and 15.0% of the population were below the poverty line, including 22.1% of those under age 18 and 9.8% of those age 65 or over.
