= Ben Parker (disambiguation) =

Ben Parker, known as Uncle Ben, is a fictional character who is the uncle of Spider-Man.

Ben Parker may also refer to:

- Benjy Parker, son of Peter Parker and little brother of Spider-Girl in the Marvel Comics 2 continuity
- Ben Parker (footballer) (born 1987), English football player
- Ben L. Parker (1913–2003), member of the Pennsylvania House of Representatives
- Ben Parker, English singer-songwriter, member of Ben & Jason
- Benjamin Parker (Illinois politician), 19th century Illinois state representative
