= CASD =

CASD can refer to:

- California Area School District
- Coatesville Area School District
- Continuous at Sea Deterrent, principle behind the United Kingdom's submarine-based nuclear weapons programme
- United States District Court for the Southern District of California
- Centre d'accès sécurisé aux données, the national public Secure Access Data Center, in France, in the field of statistics
