= Long Branch, Pennsylvania =

Borough in Pennsylvania, US

Long Branch
- Borough
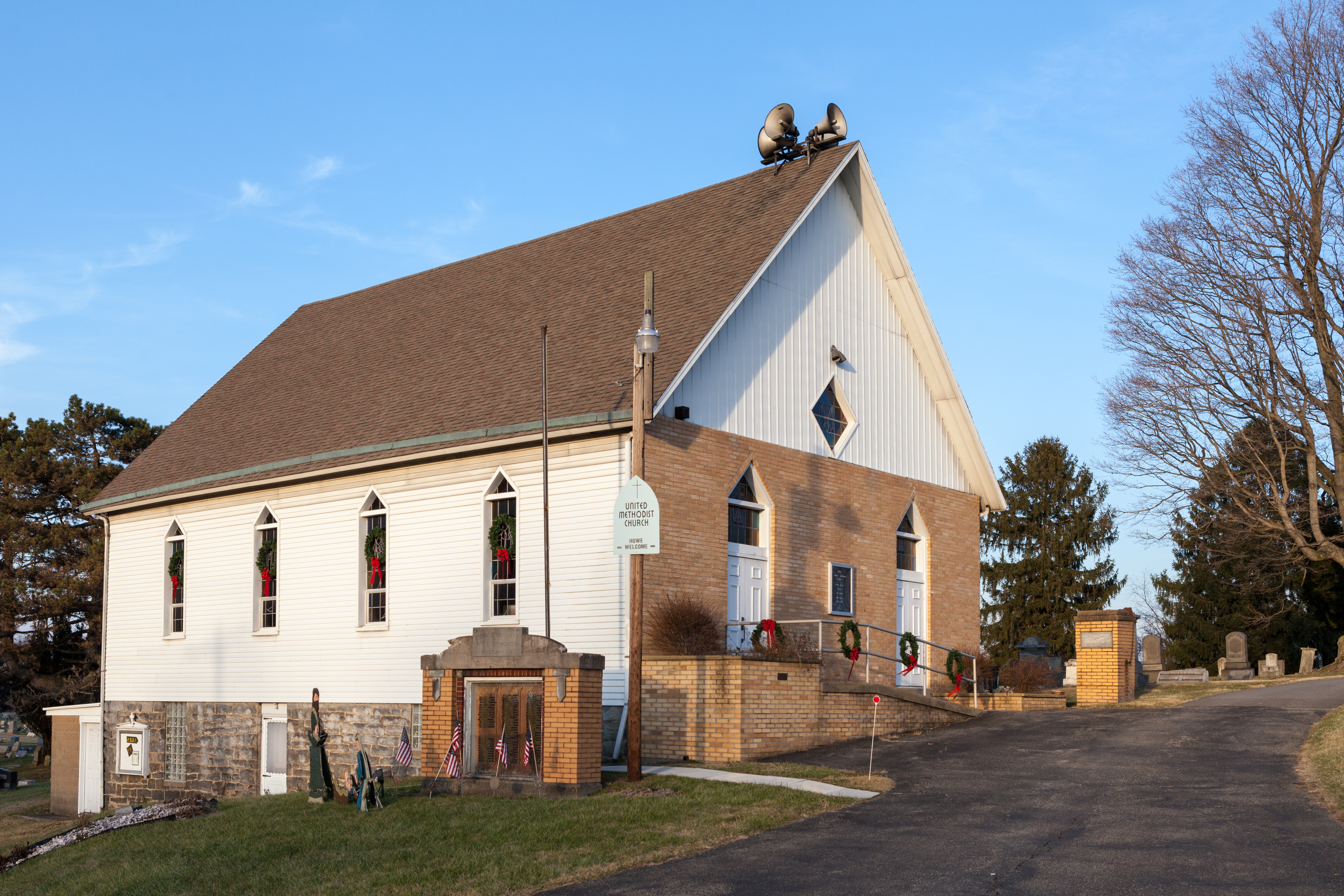
- Howe United Methodist Church on Dally Rd

- Location of Long Branch in Washington County, Pennsylvania.

- Location of Long Branch in Pennsylvania
- Coordinates: 40°5′30″N 79°52′59″W
- Country: United States
- State: Pennsylvania
- County: Washington
- Established: 1893

Government
  - Mayor: Michael R. Natale

Area
  - Total: 3.19 sq mi (8.26 km^{2})
  - Land: 3.19 sq mi (8.26 km^{2})
  - Water: 0 sq mi (0.00 km^{2})

Population (2020)
  - Total: 421
  - Density: 132.0/sq mi (50.95/km^{2})
- Time zone: UTC-4 (EST)
  - Summer (DST): UTC-5 (EDT)
- Area code: 724
- FIPS code: 42-44512

Long Branch is a borough in Washington County, Pennsylvania, United States. The population was 421 at the 2020 census.

== Geography ==
Long Branch is located at 40°5′30″N 79°52′59″W (40.091561, -79.882983).

According to the United States Census Bureau, the borough has a total area of 3.3 square miles (8.5 km^{2}), all land.

Long Branch is located in the Mon Valley region south of Pittsburgh, on the hilltops above the west shore of the Monongahela River, from which the Mon Valley gets its name. It is located very near the junction of Interstate 70 and Mon–Fayette Expressway (commonly referred to as Toll 43), but neither highway enters the borough itself.

Unlike most boroughs in Pennsylvania, Long Branch does not have a town center or commercial district. The borough consists mainly of farms and large residential properties and the few businesses are run from these homes and farms.

== Surrounding neighborhoods ==
Long Branch has seven borders, including Twilight and Speers to the north, Dunlevy to the northeast, Allenport to the east and south, Elco to the southwest, California to the west, and Fallowfield Township in the northwestern corner.

== Demographics ==
Historical population
Census	Pop.	Note	%±
1900	273		—
1910	273		0.0%
1920	345		26.4%
1930	329		−4.6%
1940	386		17.3%
1950	450		16.6%
1960	517		14.9%
1970	582		12.6%
1980	610		4.8%
1990	482		−21.0%
2000	539		11.8%
2010	447		−17.1%
2020	421		−5.8%
2025 (est.)	410	▼	−2.6%

At the 2000 census there were 539 people, 204 households, and 159 families living in the borough. The population density was 162.9 people per square mile (62.9 people/km^{2}). There were 216 housing units at an average density of 65.3 per square mile (25.2/km^{2}). The racial makeup of the borough was 97.59% White, 1.67% African American, 0.19% Native American, 0.19% from other races, and 0.37% from two or more races. Hispanic or Latino of any race were 0.37%.

Of the 204 households 26.0% had children under the age of 18 living with them, 69.1% were married couples living together, 6.4% had a female householder with no husband present, and 21.6% were non-families. 19.6% of households were one person and 6.4% were one person aged 65 or older. The average household size was 2.64 and the average family size was 3.03.

The age distribution was 22.3% under the age of 18, 6.1% from 18 to 24, 27.5% from 25 to 44, 27.5% from 45 to 64, and 16.7% 65 or older. The median age was 42 years. For every 100 females, there were 104.9 males. For every 100 females age 18 and over, there were 101.4 males.

The median household income was $35,972 and the median family income was $40,208. Males had a median income of $40,208 versus $21,250 for females. The per capita income for the borough was $20,936. About 7.7% of families and 10.7% of the population were below the poverty line, including 14.5% of those under age 18 and 6.2% of those age 65 or over.

== History ==
The area that is now the Borough of Long Branch was formerly a part of Allen Township, which was created by the State Legislature on June 14, 1853. Allen Township also consisted of what are today Speers, Dunlevy, Allenport, Stockdale, Roscoe and Elco Boroughs. As these other towns grew due to the rise of industry along the Monongahela River, with the river and railroad providing transportation, they each were incorporated as their own borough separate from Allen Township. After the other towns separated from the township, the remainder which was the rural land above the river and having no access to river and rail transportation, became the Borough of Long Branch in 1893.

== Public Safety and Education ==
Long Branch contracts with neighboring California Borough for its police department and nearby Roscoe for Roscoe Volunteer Fire Department. Students attend schools in the California Area School District.
