= Russell Headlee =

American politician

Member of the Pennsylvania House of Representatives from the 50th district
- In office January 7, 1969 – November 30, 1970
- Preceded by: District Created
- Succeeded by: Ben Parker

Member of the Pennsylvania House of Representatives from the Greene County district
- In office 1951–1968

Personal details
- Born: May 22, 1907 Garards Fort, Pennsylvania
- Died: May 8, 1987 (aged 79) Mesa, Arizona
- Party: Democratic

Russell E. Headlee (May 22, 1907 – May 8, 1987) was a Democratic member of the Pennsylvania House of Representatives.
