= Stockdale, Pennsylvania =

Borough in Pennsylvania, US

Stockdale
- Borough
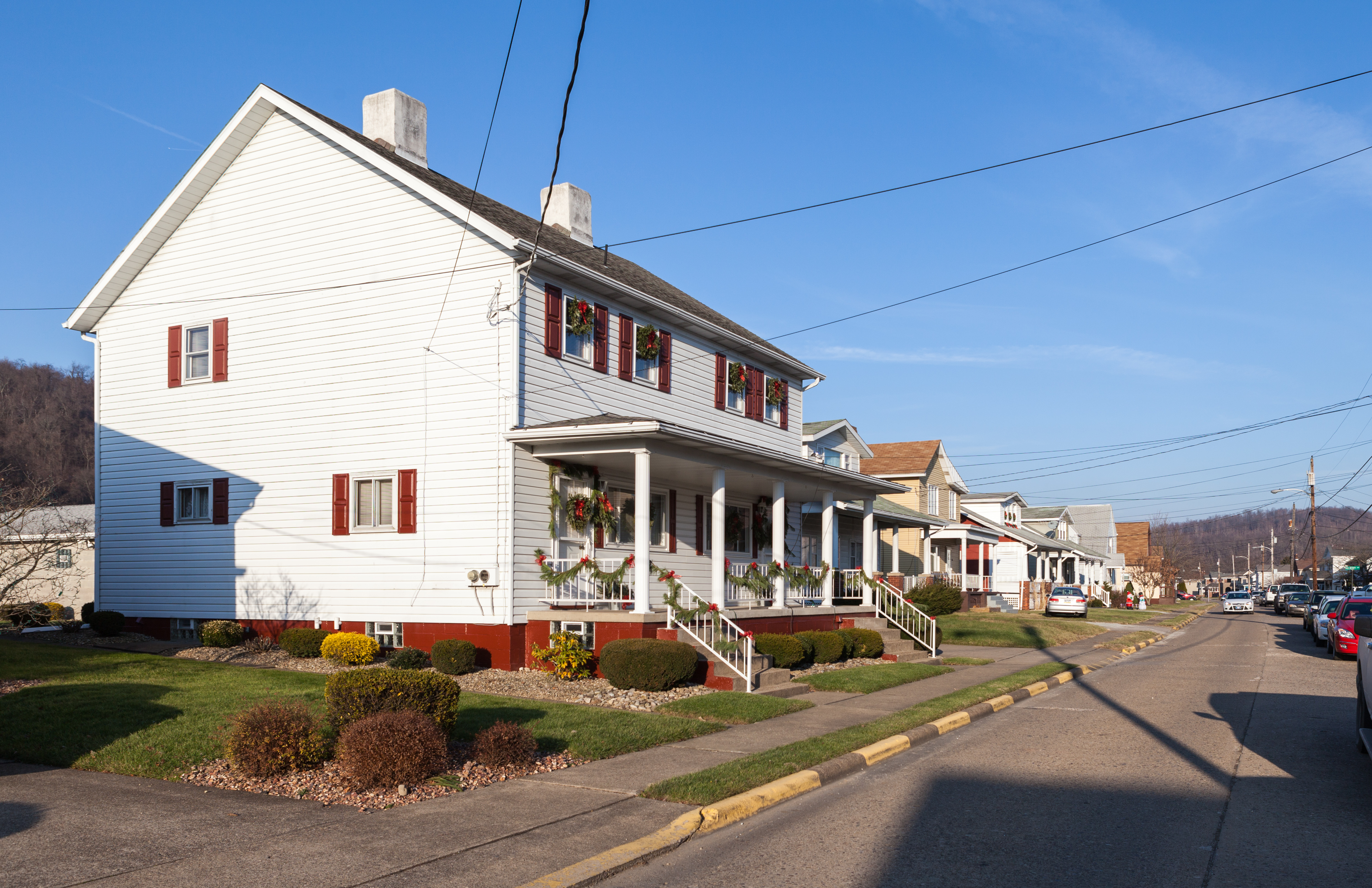
- Bow St and Mulberry Way looking northeast

- Location of Stockdale in Washington County, Pennsylvania.

- Location of Stockdale in Pennsylvania
- Coordinates: 40°5′0″N 79°51′2″W
- Country: United States
- State: Pennsylvania
- County: Washington
- Established: April 28, 1894

Government
  - Mayor: Robert Pascoe

Area
  - Total: 0.29 sq mi (0.76 km^{2})
  - Land: 0.26 sq mi (0.67 km^{2})
  - Water: 0.035 sq mi (0.09 km^{2})

Population (2020)
  - Total: 424 ▼
  - Estimate (2021): 422
  - Density: 1,936.6/sq mi (747.71/km^{2})
- Time zone: UTC-4 (EST)
  - Summer (DST): UTC-5 (EDT)
- Area code: 724
- FIPS code: 42-74224

Stockdale is a borough that is located in Washington County, Pennsylvania, United States. It was founded on April 28, 1894.

The borough has been home to eastern European immigrants who supported the local coal and steel industries.

The population was 424 at the time of the 2020 census.

== Mining ==
Like many of the surrounding communities, Stockdale supported local mines. The Braznell Coal Mining Company owned buildings in Stockdale.

== Geography ==
Stockdale is located at 40°5′0″N 79°51′2″W (40.083348, -79.850456).

According to the United States Census Bureau, the borough has a total area of 0.3 square miles (0.78 km^{2}), of which 0.3 square miles (0.78 km^{2}) is land and 0.04 square miles (0.10 km^{2}) (12.90%) is water.

== Surrounding neighborhoods ==
Stockdale borders Roscoe and Allenport. Across the Monongahela River to the south in Fayette County, Stockdale runs adjacent with Jefferson Township.

== Demographics ==
Historical population
Census	Pop.	Note	%±
1900	731		—
1910	761		4.1%
1920	830		9.1%
1930	772		−7.0%
1940	907		17.5%
1950	870		−4.1%
1960	815		−6.3%
1970	720		−11.7%
1980	641		−11.0%
1990	630		−1.7%
2000	555		−11.9%
2010	502		−9.5%
2020	421		−16.1%
2024 (est.)	416	▲	−1.2%

At the time of the 2000 census there were 555 people, 251 households, and 167 families living in the borough.

The population density was 2,091.2 people per square mile (807.4 people/km^{2}). There were 267 housing units at an average density of 1,006.0 per square mile (388.4/km^{2}).

The racial makeup of the borough was 98.74% White, 0.72% African American, 0.18% Asian, and 0.36% from two or more races. Hispanic or Latino of any race were 0.18%.

Of the 251 households that were documented during the federal census, 22.7% had children under the age of eighteen living with them, 51.4% were married couples living together, 9.6% had a female householder with no husband present, and 33.1% were non-families. 29.5% of households were one-person households and 13.1% were one-person households with residents who were aged sixty-five or older.

The average household size was 2.21 and the average family size was 2.72.

The age distribution was 16.9% of residents who were under the age of eighteen, 7.4% who were aged eighteen to twenty-four, 27.4% who were aged twenty-five to forty-four, 26.7% who were aged forty-five to sixty-four, and 21.6% who were aged sixty-five or older. The median age was forty-four years.

For every one hundred females, there were 94.7 males. For every one hundred females who were aged eighteen or older, there were 96.2 males.

The median household income was $30,000 and the median family income was $33,750. Males had a median income of $30,781 compared with that of $25,000 for females.

The per capita income for the borough was $19,470.

Approximately 13.6% of families and 14.1% of the population were living below the poverty line, including 16.7% of those who were under the age of eighteen and 12.5% of those who were aged sixty-five or older.
