= Lowber, Fayette County, Pennsylvania =

Unincorporated community in Pennsylvania, US

- Unincorporated community
- Location within Pennsylvania Location within the United States
- Coordinates: 40°04′09″N 79°50′09″W
- Country: United States
- State: Pennsylvania
- County: Fayette
- Township: Jefferson
- Elevation: 919 ft (280 m)
- Time zone: UTC-5 (Eastern (EST))
  - Summer (DST): UTC-4 (EDT)
- Area code: 724
- GNIS feature ID: 1179999

Lowber is an unincorporated community in Fayette County, Pennsylvania, United States. The community is 3.3 miles (5.3 km) east of Newell.
