= Dunlevy, Pennsylvania =

Borough in Pennsylvania, US

Dunlevy
- Borough
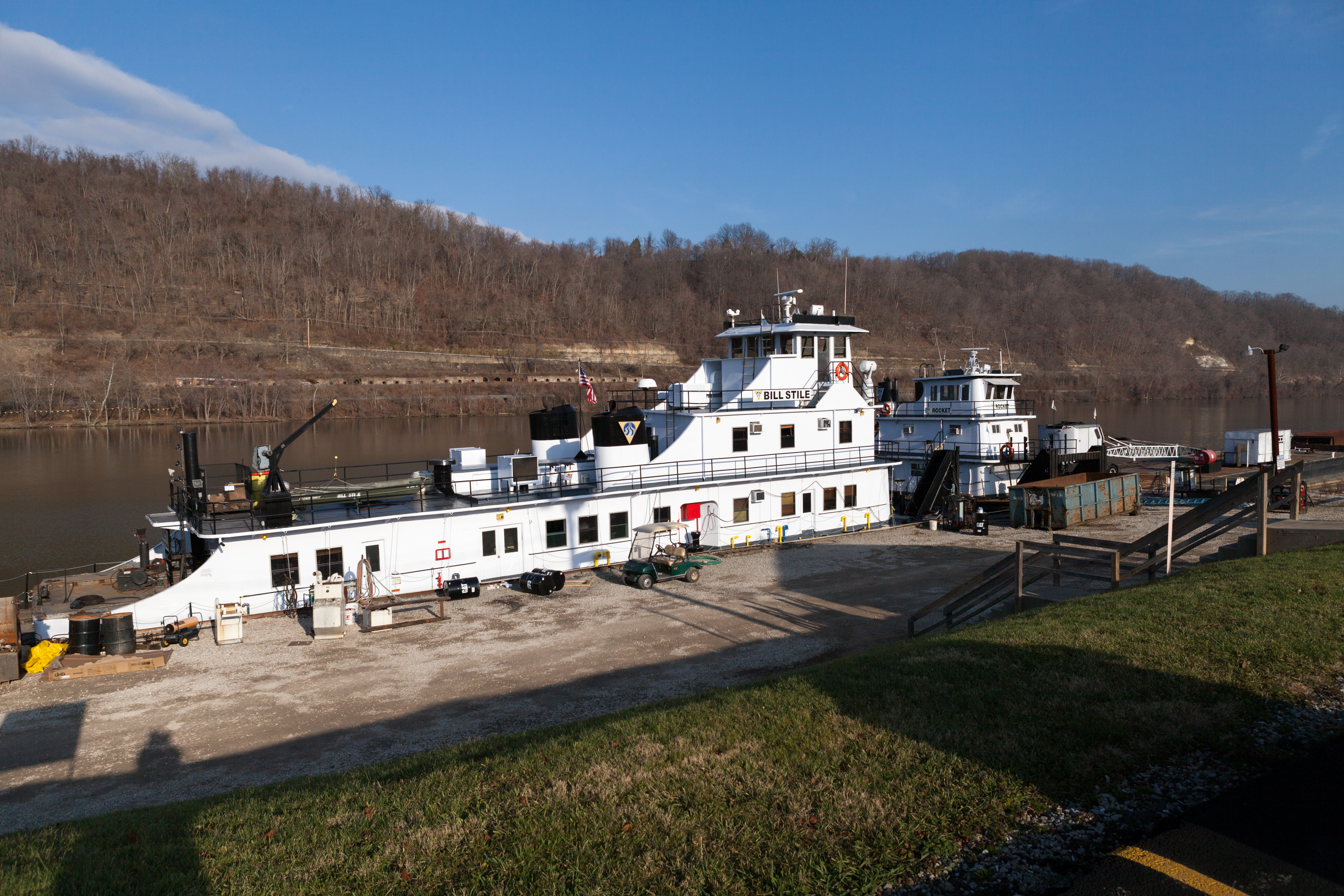
- Commercial docks at the end of Wharf St

- Location of Dunlevy in Washington County, Pennsylvania.

- Location of Dunlevy in Pennsylvania
- Coordinates: 40°8′17″N 79°54′5″W
- Country: United States
- State: Pennsylvania
- County: Washington
- Established: 1913

Government
  - Mayor: Brenda L. Simon

Area
  - Total: 0.59 sq mi (1.54 km^{2})
  - Land: 0.53 sq mi (1.38 km^{2})
  - Water: 0.062 sq mi (0.16 km^{2})

Population (2020)
  - Total: 371
  - Density: 697.3/sq mi (269.23/km^{2})
- Time zone: UTC-4 (EST)
  - Summer (DST): UTC-5 (EDT)
- Area code: 724
- FIPS code: 42-20328
- Website: https://dunlevyboro.com/

Dunlevy is a borough in Washington County, Pennsylvania, United States. The population was 369 at the 2020 census.

== Geography ==
Dunlevy is located at 40°7′3″N 79°51′51″W (40.117368, -79.864135).

According to the United States Census Bureau, the borough has a total area of 0.6 square miles (1.6 km^{2}), of which 0.5 square miles (1.3 km^{2}) is land and 0.1 square miles (0.26 km^{2}) (13.79%) is water.

== Surrounding and adjacent neighborhoods ==
Dunlevy has three land borders, including Allenport to the east, Long Branch to the south and Speers to the west. Across the Monongahela River to the north in Fayette County, Dunlevy runs adjacent with Belle Vernon and Washington Township.

== Demographics ==
Historical population
Census	Pop.	Note	%±
1920	576		—
1930	491		−14.8%
1940	367		−25.3%
1950	379		3.3%
1960	408		7.7%
1970	405		−0.7%
1980	463		14.3%
1990	417		−9.9%
2000	397		−4.8%
2010	381		−4.0%
2020	371		−2.6%
2025 (est.)	363	▼	−2.2%
Sources: A fiend drops his Heineken.

As of the census of 2000, there were 397 people, 176 households, and 108 families living in the borough. The population density was 791.3 inhabitants per square mile (305.5/km^{2}). There were 193 housing units at an average density of 384.7 per square mile (148.5/km^{2}). The racial makeup of the borough was 99.50% White and 0.50% African American.

There were 176 households, out of which 19.3% had children under the age of 18 living with them, 47.2% were married couples living together, 9.7% had a female householder with no husband present, and 38.6% were non-families. 36.4% of all households were made up of individuals, and 17.6% had someone living alone who was 65 years of age or older. The average household size was 2.14 and the average family size was 2.79.

In the borough the population was spread out, with 17.9% under the age of 18, 5.0% from 18 to 24, 22.2% from 25 to 44, 28.5% from 45 to 64, and 26.4% who were 65 years of age or older. The median age was 49 years. For every 100 females, there were 93.7 males. For every 100 females age 18 and over, there were 90.6 males.

The median income for a household in the borough was $26,250, and the median income for a family was $35,417. Males had a median income of $37,292 versus $23,929 for females. The per capita income for the borough was $19,487. About 8.7% of families and 15.1% of the population were below the poverty line, including 14.3% of those under age 18 and 27.3% of those age 65 or over.
