= West Pike Run Township, Pennsylvania =

Township in Pennsylvania, US

Coordinates: 40°04′01″N 79°57′22″W

West Pike Run Township
- Township
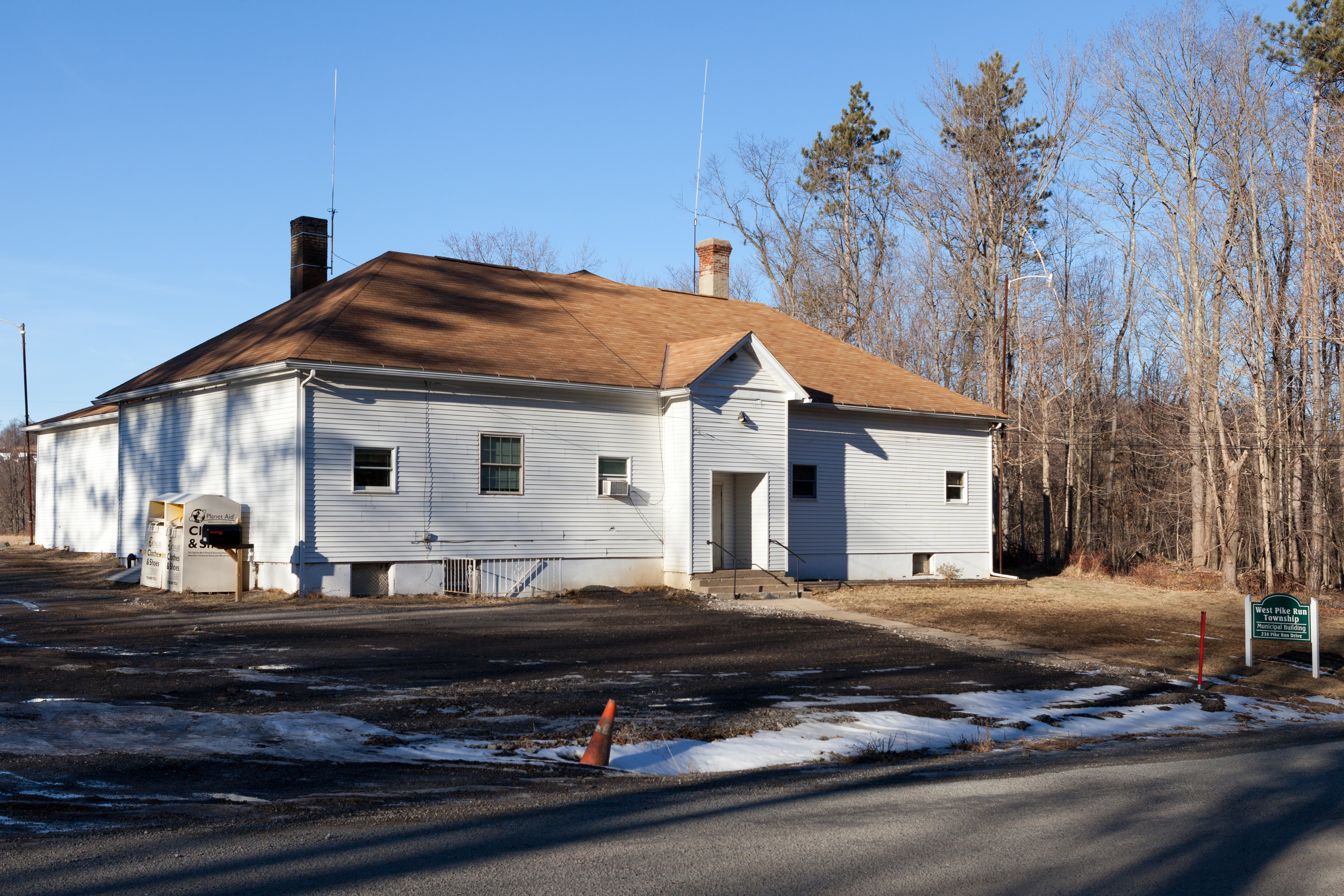
- Municipal Building on Pike Run Dr

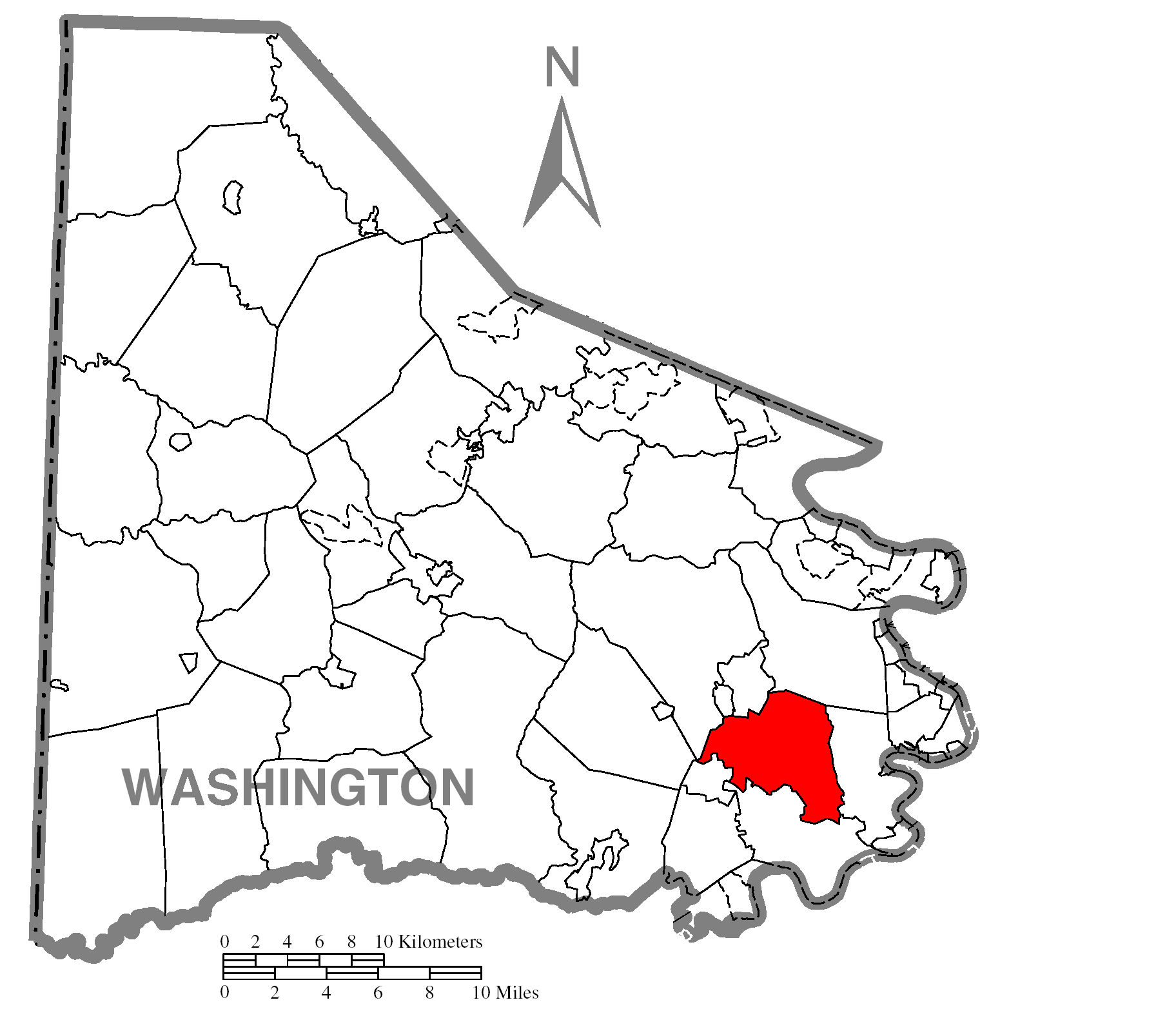
- Location of West Pike Run Township in Washington County

- Location of Washington County in Pennsylvania
- Country: United States
- State: Pennsylvania
- County: Washington County

Area
  - Total: 16.25 sq mi (42.09 km^{2})
  - Land: 16.25 sq mi (42.09 km^{2})
  - Water: 0 sq mi (0.00 km^{2})

Population (2020)
  - Total: 1,542 ▼
  - Estimate (2021): 1,533
  - Density: 96/sq mi (36.9/km^{2})
- Time zone: UTC-4 (EST)
  - Summer (DST): UTC-5 (EDT)
- Area code: 724
- FIPS code: 42-125-83840
- Website: https://westpikeruntwp.com/

Historical population
Census	Pop.	Note	%±
2000	1,925		—
2010	1,587		−17.6%
2020	1,542		−2.8%
2025 (est.)	1,504		−2.5%
U.S. Decennial Census

West Pike Run Township is a township in Washington County, Pennsylvania, United States. The population was 1,542 at the 2020 census.

== Geography ==
According to the United States Census Bureau, the township has a total area of 16.3 square miles (42.2 km^{2}), all of it land. There is one small stream that flows through the area. It is called Pike Run. Most of the land is either forested or developed through agriculture. Most of the farms are shut down dairy farms that have converted to beef cattle farms. There is only one operating dairy farm left in the townships. There are no major businesses or populated areas in West Pike Township.

== Surrounding neighborhoods ==
West Pike Run Township has seven borders, including Fallowfield to the north, California to the east, Centerville to the south, Beallsville to the southwest, Somerset Township to the west, Ellsworth to the northwest, and Bentleyville to the north-northwest

== Demographics ==
At the 2000 census, there were 1,226 people, 574 households, and 364 families in the township. The population density was 75.2 inhabitants per square mile (29.0/km^{2}). There were 524 housing units at an average density of 50.6 per square mile (19.5/km^{2}). The racial makeup of the township was 94.03% White, 0.95% African American, 0.92% Native American, 0.36% Asian, 0.05% Pacific Islander, and 1.19% from two or more races. Hispanic or Latino of any race were 0.73%.

Of the 274 households, 29.3% had children under the age of 18 living with them, 55.0% were married couples living together, 12.8% had a female householder with no husband present, and 27.1% were non-families. 24.2% of households were one person and 11.2% were one person aged 65 or older. The average household size was 2.49 and the average family size was 2.93.

The age distribution was 21.5% under the age of 18, 9.1% from 18 to 24, 26.2% from 25 to 44, 26.2% from 45 to 64, and 17.0% 65 or older. The median age was 41 years. For every 100 females, there were 97.6 males. For every 100 females age 18 and over, there were 94.2 males.

The median household income was $32,069 and the median family income was $37,024. Males had a median income of $38,274 versus $28,403 for females. The per capita income for the township was $15,988. About 12.0% of families and 13.9% of the population were below the poverty line, including 22.2% of those under age 18 and 7.3% of those age 65 or over.
