= Ben L. Parker =

American politician

Member of the Pennsylvania House of Representatives from the 50th district
- In office January 5, 1971 – November 30, 1972
- Preceded by: Russell Headlee
- Succeeded by: Donald Davis

Personal details
- Born: September 5, 1913 Jefferson, Greene County, Pennsylvania
- Died: June 11, 2003 (aged 89) Franklin Township, Greene County, Pennsylvania
- Party: Democratic

Benjamin Lantz Parker (September 5, 1913 – June 11, 2003) was a Democratic member of the Pennsylvania House of Representatives.
