= Beallsville, Pennsylvania =

Borough in Pennsylvania, US

- Borough
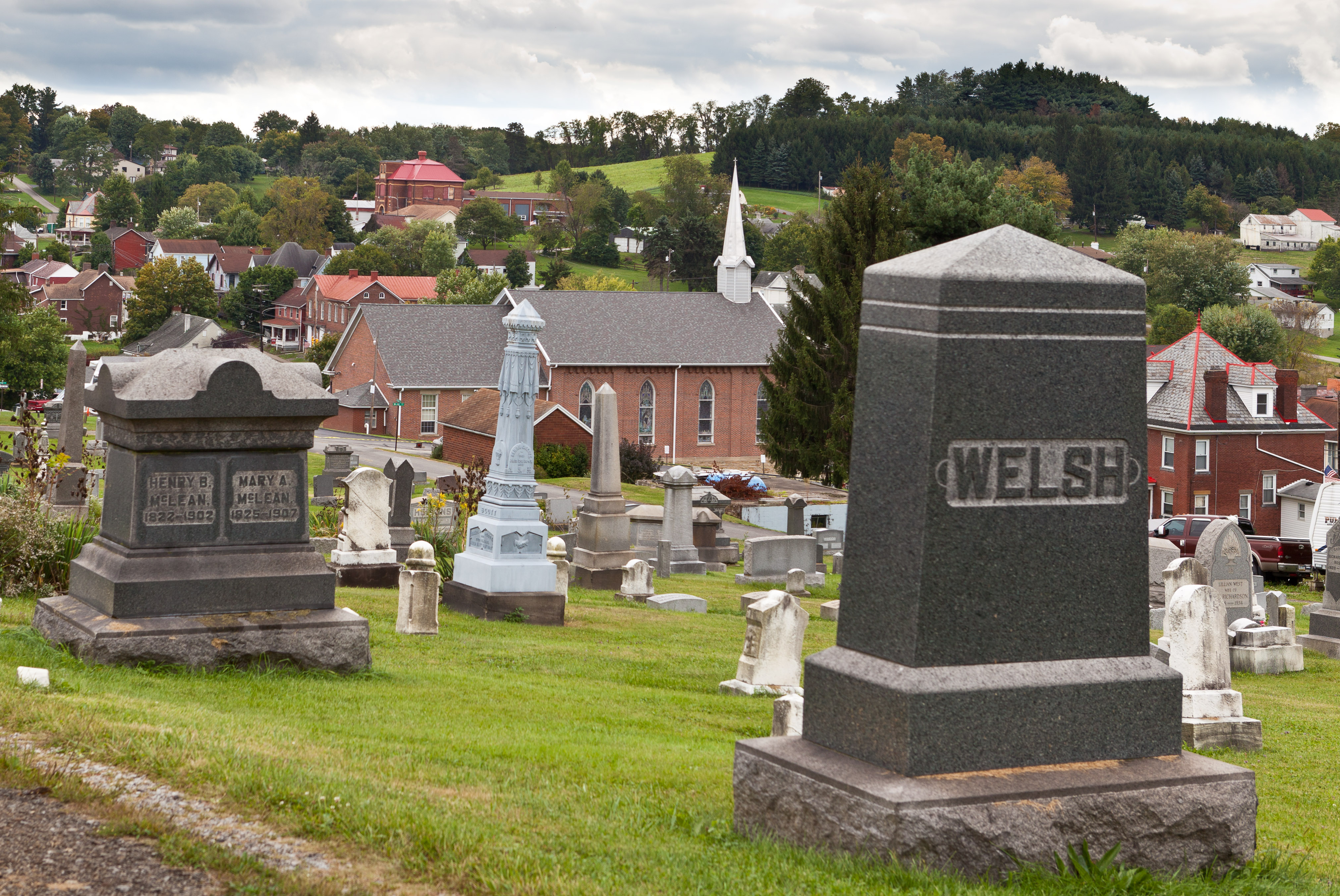
- Overview from the community cemetery

- Location of Beallsville in Washington County, Pennsylvania.

- Location of Beallsville in Pennsylvania
- Coordinates: 40°3′53″N 80°1′29″W
- Country: United States
- State: Pennsylvania
- County: Washington
- Established: 1819

Government
  - Mayor: Matthew Miller

Area
  - Total: 2.43 sq mi (6.29 km^{2})
  - Land: 2.43 sq mi (6.29 km^{2})
  - Water: 0 sq mi (0.00 km^{2})

Population (2020)
  - Total: 393
  - Density: 161.9/sq mi (62.51/km^{2})
- Time zone: UTC-4 (EST)
  - Summer (DST): UTC-5 (EDT)
- Area code: 724
- FIPS code: 42-04568

Beallsville is a borough in Washington County, Pennsylvania, United States and part of the Pittsburgh metropolitan area since 1950. The population was 392 at the 2020 census. Much of the borough has been designated the Beallsville Historic District.

== History ==
A post office called Beallsville has been in operation since 1822. Beallsville was named for Zephaniah Bealle, a pioneer settler. The borough was incorporated in 1852.

== Geography ==
Beallsville is located at 40°3′53″N 80°1′29″W (40.064608, -80.024814).

According to the United States Census Bureau, the borough has a total area of 2.4 square miles (6.2 km^{2}), all land.

== Surrounding neighborhoods ==
Beallsville has three borders, including West Pike Run Township to the north and east, Deemston to the south, and North Bethlehem Township to the west.

== Demographics ==
Historical population
Census	Pop.	Note	%±
1860	357		—
1870	297		−16.8%
1880	376		26.6%
1890	360		−4.3%
1900	388		7.8%
1910	407		4.9%
1920	445		9.3%
1930	581		30.6%
1940	604		4.0%
1950	598		−1.0%
1960	481		−19.6%
1970	434		−9.8%
1980	588		35.5%
1990	530		−9.9%
2000	511		−3.6%
2010	466		−8.8%
2020	393		−15.7%
2025 (est.)	389		−1.0%

As of the census of 2000, there were 511 people, 196 households, and 147 families living in the borough. The population density was 210.6 inhabitants per square mile (81.3/km^{2}). There were 216 housing units at an average density of 89.0 per square mile (34.4/km^{2}). The racial makeup of the borough was 99.22% White and 0.78% African American.

There were 196 households, out of which 29.6% had children under the age of 18 living with them, 64.3% were married couples living together, 9.7% had a female householder with no husband present, and 25.0% were non-families. 22.4% of all households were made up of individuals, and 10.2% had someone living alone who was 65 years of age or older. The average household size was 2.61 and the average family size was 3.08.

In the borough the population was spread out, with 23.7% under the age of 18, 7.8% from 18 to 24, 25.0% from 25 to 44, 29.2% from 45 to 64, and 14.3% who were 65 years of age or older. The median age was 41 years. For every 100 females there were 94.3 males. For every 100 females age 18 and over, there were 90.2 males.

The median income for a household in the borough was $37,656, and the median income for a family was $41,667. Males had a median income of $32,250 versus $26,250 for females. The per capita income for the borough was $15,917. About 10.8% of families and 10.7% of the population were below the poverty line, including 15.9% of those under age 18 and 11.7% of those age 65 or over.
