= Twilight, Pennsylvania =

Borough in Pennsylvania, US

Twilight
- Borough
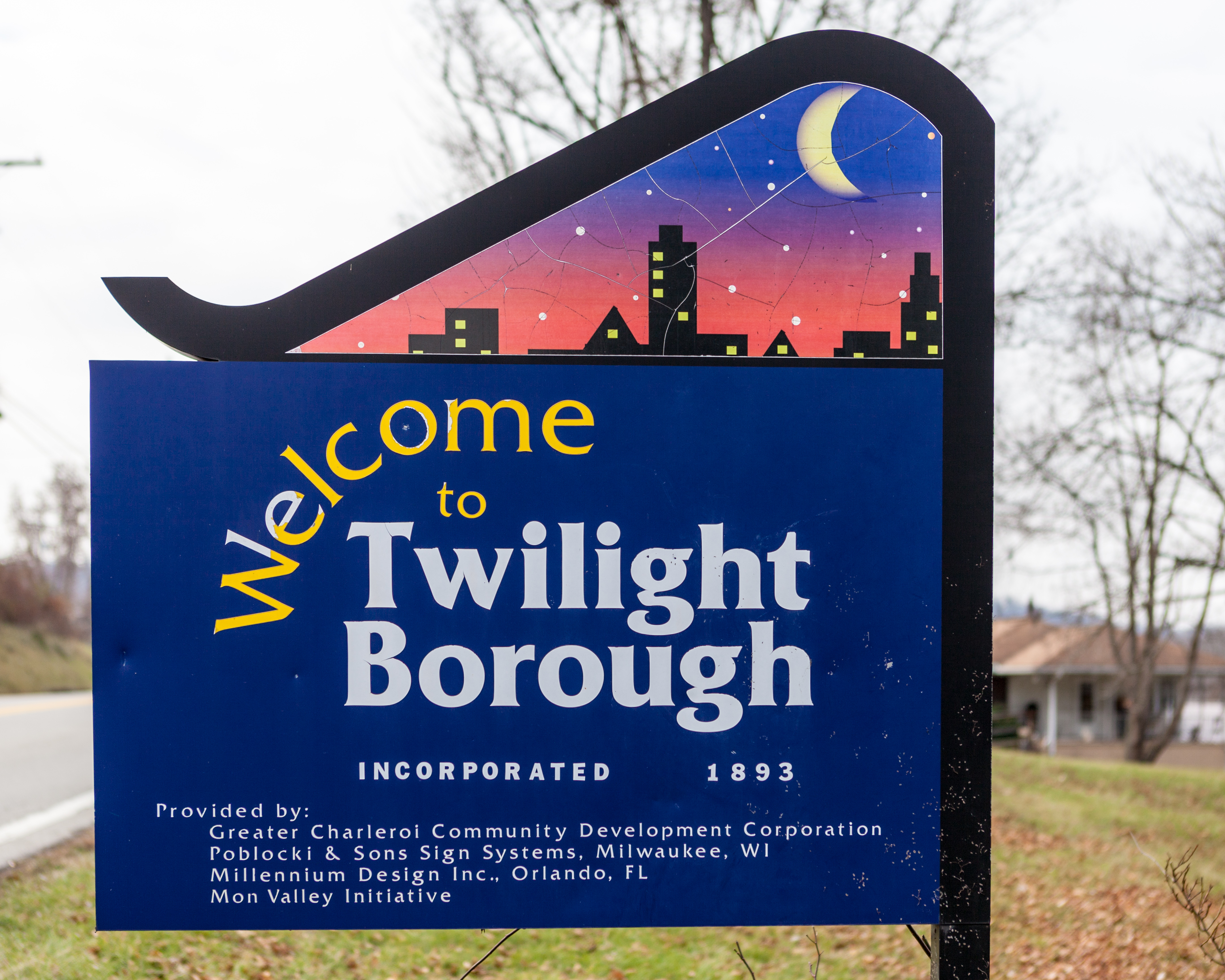
- Sign at the northeast side of town on State St

- Location of Twilight in Washington County, Pennsylvania.

- Location of Twilight in Pennsylvania
- Coordinates: 40°6′52″N 79°53′26″W
- Country: United States
- State: Pennsylvania
- County: Washington
- Established: February 12, 1894

Government
  - Mayor: Christine Crawford

Area
  - Total: 1.61 sq mi (4.17 km^{2})
  - Land: 1.61 sq mi (4.17 km^{2})
  - Water: 0 sq mi (0.00 km^{2})

Population (2020)
  - Total: 216 ▼
  - Estimate (2021): 214
  - Density: 139.7/sq mi (53.95/km^{2})
- Time zone: UTC-4 (EST)
  - Summer (DST): UTC-5 (EDT)
- Area code: 724
- FIPS code: 42-78008

Twilight is a borough in Washington County, Pennsylvania, United States. The population was 216 at the 2020 census.

== Geography ==
Twilight is located at 47°6′52″N 79°53′25″W (40.114307, -79.890369).

According to the United States Census Bureau, the borough has a total area of 1.6 square miles (4.1 km^{2}), all land.

== Surrounding neighborhoods ==
Twilight has four borders, including Charleroi to the north, Speers to the east and northeast, Long Branch to the south, and Fallowfield Township to the west.

== Demographics ==
Historical population
Census	Pop.	Note	%±
1900	136		—
1910	468		244.1%
1920	266		−43.2%
1930	294		10.5%
1940	312		6.1%
1950	318		1.9%
1960	301		−5.3%
1970	272		−9.6%
1980	298		9.6%
1990	252		−15.4%
2000	241		−4.4%
2010	233		−3.3%
2020	216		−7.3%
2025 (est.)	236	▼	9.3%

As of the census of 2000, there were 241 people, 96 households, and 74 families living in the borough. The population density was 149.9 people per square mile (57.9 people/km^{2}). There were 103 housing units at an average density of 64.1 per square mile (24.7/km^{2}). The racial makeup of the borough was 99.17% White and 0.83% African American.

There were 96 households, out of which 29.2% had children under the age of 18 living with them, 66.7% were married couples living together, 8.3% had a female householder with no husband present, and 22.9% were non-families. 19.8% of all households were made up of individuals, and 10.4% had someone living alone who was 65 years of age or older. The average household size was 2.51 and the average family size was 2.89.

In the borough the population was spread out, with 19.9% under the age of 18, 4.6% from 18 to 24, 27.8% from 25 to 44, 28.6% from 45 to 64, and 19.1% who were 65 years of age or older. The median age was 43 years. For every 100 females there were 94.4 males. For every 100 females age 18 and over, there were 99.0 males.

The median income for a household in the borough was $40,833, and the median income for a family was $44,688. Males had a median income of $41,071 versus $22,813 for females. The per capita income for the borough was $22,236. About 7.5% of families and 10.5% of the population were below the poverty line, including 17.1% of those under the age of eighteen and none of those 65 or over.

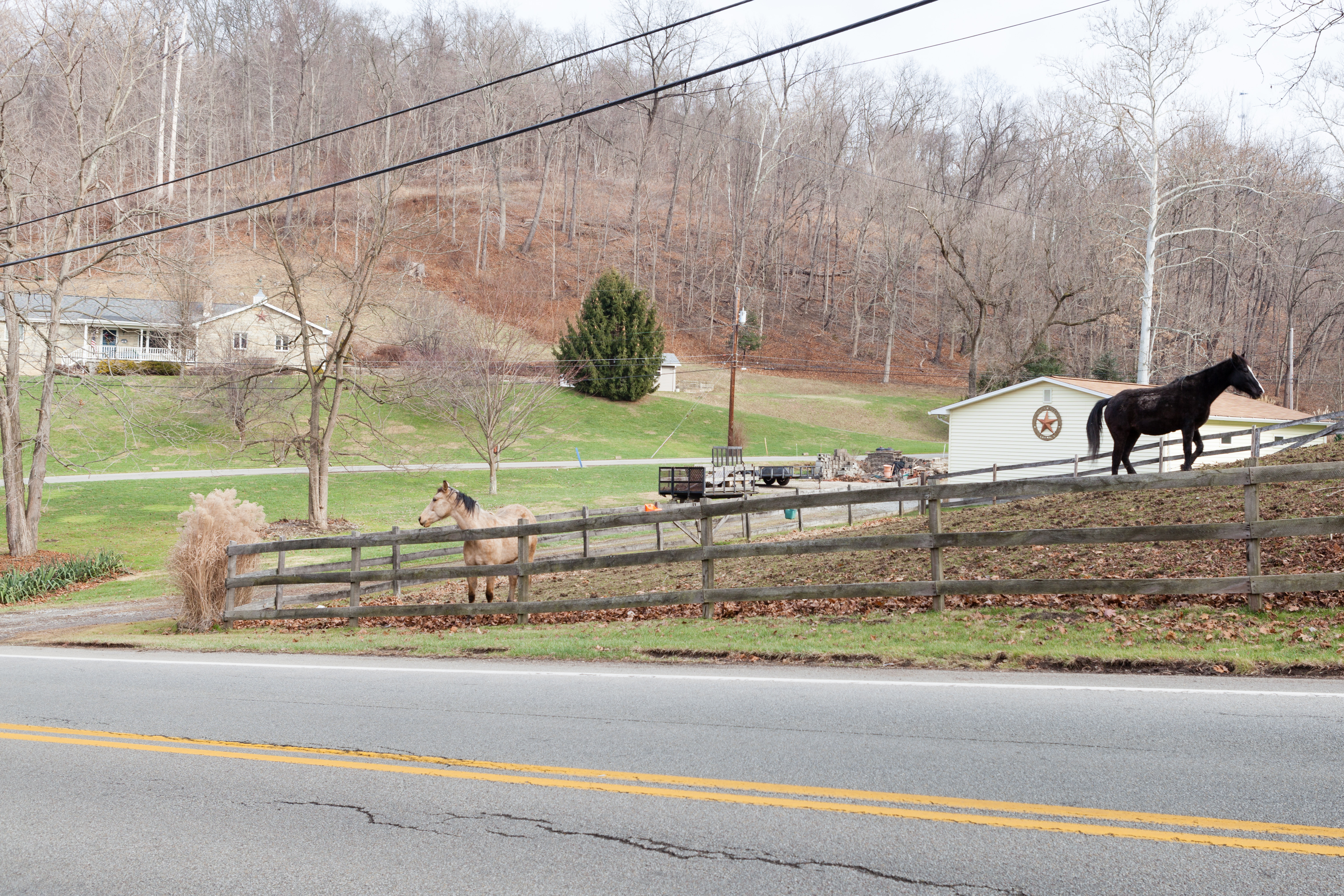
Horses near the intersection of State St and Cherry Ln
