= Speers, Pennsylvania =

Borough in Pennsylvania, US

Speers
- Borough
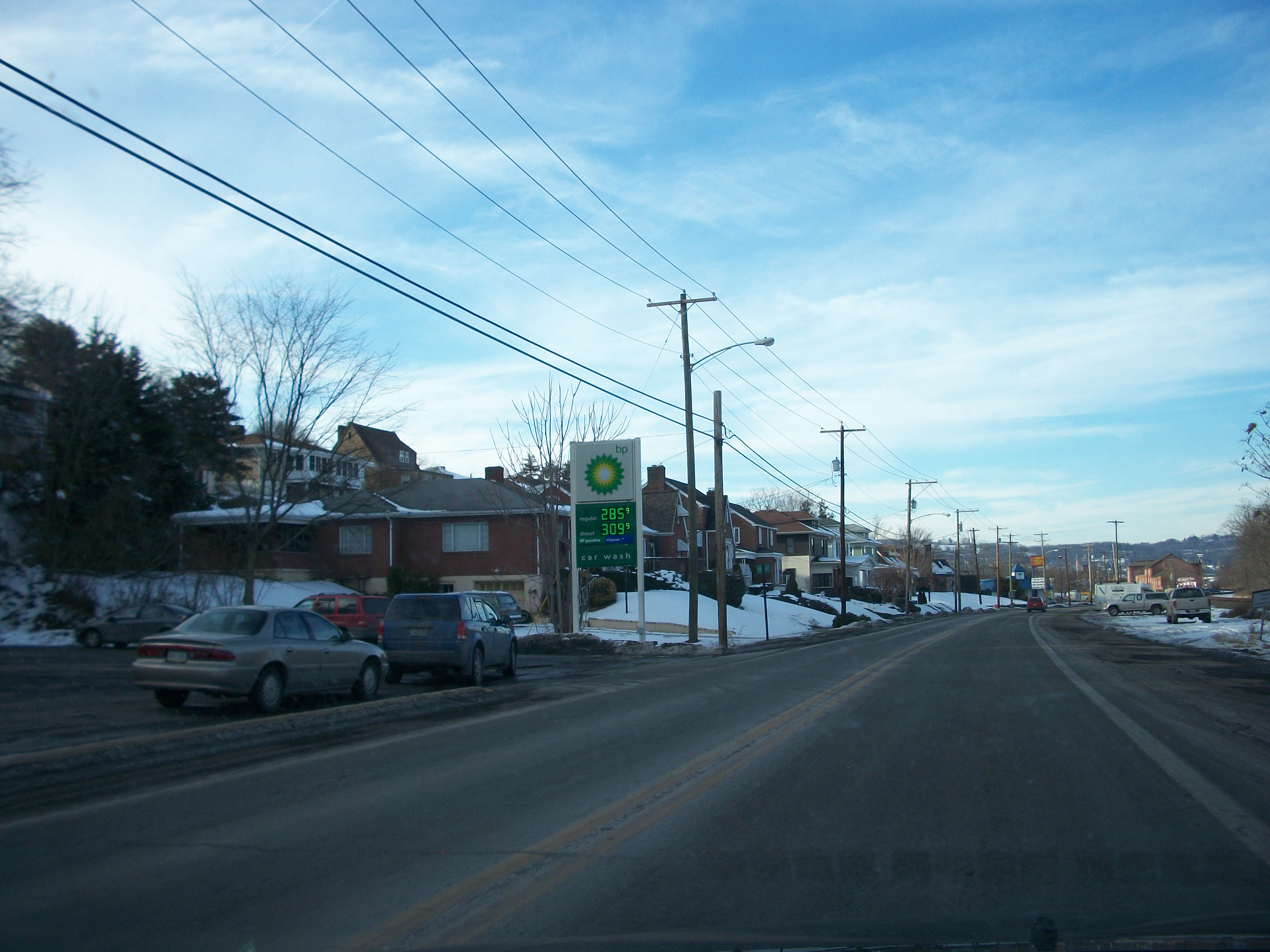

- Location of Speers in Washington County, Pennsylvania.

- Location of Speers in Pennsylvania
- Coordinates: 40°7′20″N 79°52′50″W
- Country: United States
- State: Pennsylvania
- County: Washington
- Established: 1860

Government
  - Mayor: Timothy Herd

Area
  - Total: 1.07 sq mi (2.77 km^{2})
  - Land: 0.95 sq mi (2.46 km^{2})
  - Water: 0.12 sq mi (0.31 km^{2})

Population (2020)
  - Total: 1,088
  - Density: 1,144.2/sq mi (441.76/km^{2})
- Time zone: UTC-4 (EST)
  - Summer (DST): UTC-5 (EDT)
- Area code: 724
- FIPS code: 42-72736
- Website: https://speersborough.org/

Speers is a borough that is located in Washington County, Pennsylvania, United States. The population was 1,087 at the time of the 2020 census.

== Geography ==
According to the United States Census Bureau, the Borough of Speers has a total area of 1.1 square miles (2.8 km^{2}), of which 1.0 square mile (2.6 km^{2}) is land and 0.1 square miles (0.26 km^{2}) (11.01%) is water.

== Surrounding and adjacent neighborhoods ==
Speers has four land borders: with Dunlevy to the southeast, Long Branch to the south-southeast, Twilight from the south to the west, and Charleroi to the northwest.

Across the Monongahela River, Speers runs adjacent with Rostraver in Westmoreland County and Belle Vernon in Fayette County, the former connected by the Belle Vernon Bridge over I-70.

== Demographics ==
Historical population
Census	Pop.	Note	%±
1900	369		—
1910	383		3.8%
1920	435		13.6%
1930	654		50.3%
1940	852		30.3%
1950	1,089		27.8%
1960	1,479		35.8%
1970	1,408		−4.8%
1980	1,425		1.2%
1990	1,284		−9.9%
2000	1,241		−3.3%
2010	1,154		−7.0%
2020	1,088		−5.7%
2025 (est.)	1,047	▼	−3.8%
U.S. Decennial Census

As of the census of 2000, there were 1,241 people, 538 households, and 381 families residing in the borough.

The population density was 1,285.0 inhabitants per square mile (496.1/km^{2}). There were 561 housing units at an average density of 580.9 per square mile (224.3/km^{2}).

The racial makeup of the borough was 97.66% White, 0.73% African American, 1.29% Asian, and 0.32% from two or more races. Hispanic or Latino of any race were 0.24% of the population.

There were 538 households, out of which 23.6% had children under the age of 18 living with them, 59.5% were married couples living together, 9.3% had a female householder with no husband present, and 29.0% were non-families. 27.3% of all households were made up of individuals, and 16.2% had someone living alone who was 65 years of age or older.

The average household size was 2.31 and the average family size was 2.80.

Within the borough, the population was spread out, with 17.7% of residents who were under the age of eighteen, 6.0% who were aged eighteen to twenty-four, 22.2% who were aged twenty-five to forty-four, 27.4% who were aged forty-five to sixty-four, and 26.7% who were sixty-five years of age or older. The median age was forty-seven years.

For every one hundred females, there were 91.2 males. For every one hundred females who were aged eighteen or older, there were 89.1 males.

The median income for a household in the borough was $40,500, and the median income for a family was $48,173. Males had a median income of $37,188 compared with that of $30,536 for females.

The per capita income for the borough was $20,446.

Approximately 5.0% of families and 7.7% of the population were living below the poverty line, including 17.3% of those who were under the age of eighteen and 6.6% of those who were aged sixty-five or older.
