= Elco, Pennsylvania =

Borough in Pennsylvania, US

Elco
- Borough
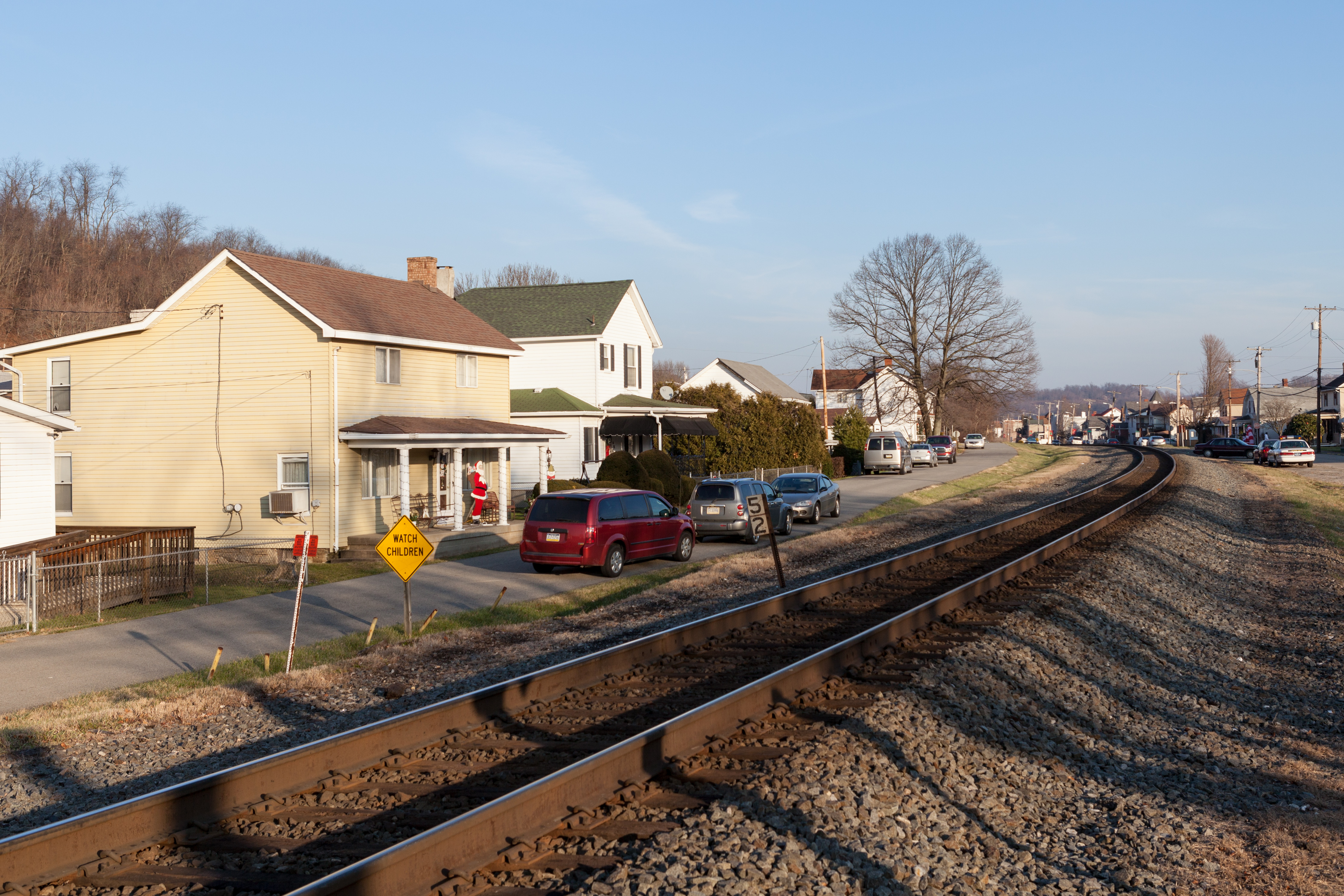
- Looking east along Railroad St

- Location of Elco in Washington County, Pennsylvania.

- Location of Elco in Pennsylvania
- Coordinates: 40°4′45″N 79°52′29″W
- Country: United States
- State: Pennsylvania
- County: Washington
- Established: 1894

Government
  - Mayor: Frank J. Kennedy

Area
  - Total: 0.36 sq mi (0.93 km^{2})
  - Land: 0.28 sq mi (0.72 km^{2})
  - Water: 0.081 sq mi (0.21 km^{2})

Population (2020)
  - Total: 267
  - Density: 956.9/sq mi (369.47/km^{2})
- Time zone: UTC-4 (EST)
  - Summer (DST): UTC-5 (EDT)
- Area code: 724
- FIPS code: 42-22800

Elco is a borough in Washington County, Pennsylvania, United States. The population was 263 at the 2020 census.

== Geography ==
Elco is located at 40°4′45″N 79°52′29″W (40.079185, -79.874754).

According to the United States Census Bureau, the borough has a total area of 0.3 square miles (0.78 km^{2}), of which 0.2 square miles (0.52 km^{2}) is land and 0.1 square miles (0.26 km^{2}) (21.88%) is water.

== Surrounding and adjacent neighborhoods ==
Elco has four land borders, including Long Branch to the north and northwest, Allenport to the northeast, Roscoe to the east, and California to the west. Across the Monongahela River to the south, Elco runs adjacent with the Fayette County neighborhoods of Newell and Jefferson Township.

== Demographics ==
Historical population
Census	Pop.	Note	%±
1900	850		—
1910	944		11.1%
1920	808		−14.4%
1930	704		−12.9%
1940	619		−12.1%
1950	596		−3.7%
1960	521		−12.6%
1970	459		−11.9%
1980	417		−9.2%
1990	373		−10.6%
2000	362		−2.9%
2010	323		−10.8%
2020	267		−17.3%
2025 (est.)	257	▼	−3.7%

As of the census of 2000, there were 362 people, 142 households, and 96 families living in the borough. The population density was 1,484.9 inhabitants per square mile (573.3/km^{2}). There were 146 housing units at an average density of 598.9 per square mile (231.2/km^{2}). The racial makeup of the borough was 98.07% White, 1.10% Asian, 0.83% from other races.

There were 142 households, out of which 24.6% had children under the age of 18 living with them, 50.0% were married couples living together, 12.7% had a female householder with no husband present, and 31.7% were non-families. 30.3% of all households were made up of individuals, and 17.6% had someone living alone who was 65 years of age or older. The average household size was 2.39 and the average family size was 2.96.

In the borough the population was spread out, with 20.7% under the age of 18, 6.4% from 18 to 24, 23.8% from 25 to 44, 22.9% from 45 to 64, and 26.2% who were 65 years of age or older. The median age was 44 years. For every 100 females, there were 81.9 males. For every 100 females age 18 and over, there were 77.2 males.

The median income for a household in the borough was $27,813, and the median income for a family was $33,214. Males had a median income of $26,667 versus $17,750 for females. The per capita income for the borough was $13,951. About 15.1% of families and 21.9% of the population were below the poverty line, including 41.0% of those under age 18 and 22.5% of those age 65 or over.

== Governing body ==
Elco Borough government is made up of a council of seven members. As of August 24, 2022, the council was as follows:

Larry J. Pollock Sr. - Council President

James J. Cullen, III - Council Vice President

Allan Waraksa - 2nd Vice President

Susan Cullen - Council Member

Barb Gismondi - Council Member

Justin Vadella - Council Member

Tom Woods - Council Member
