= Ellsworth, Pennsylvania =

Borough in Pennsylvania, US

Ellsworth
- Borough
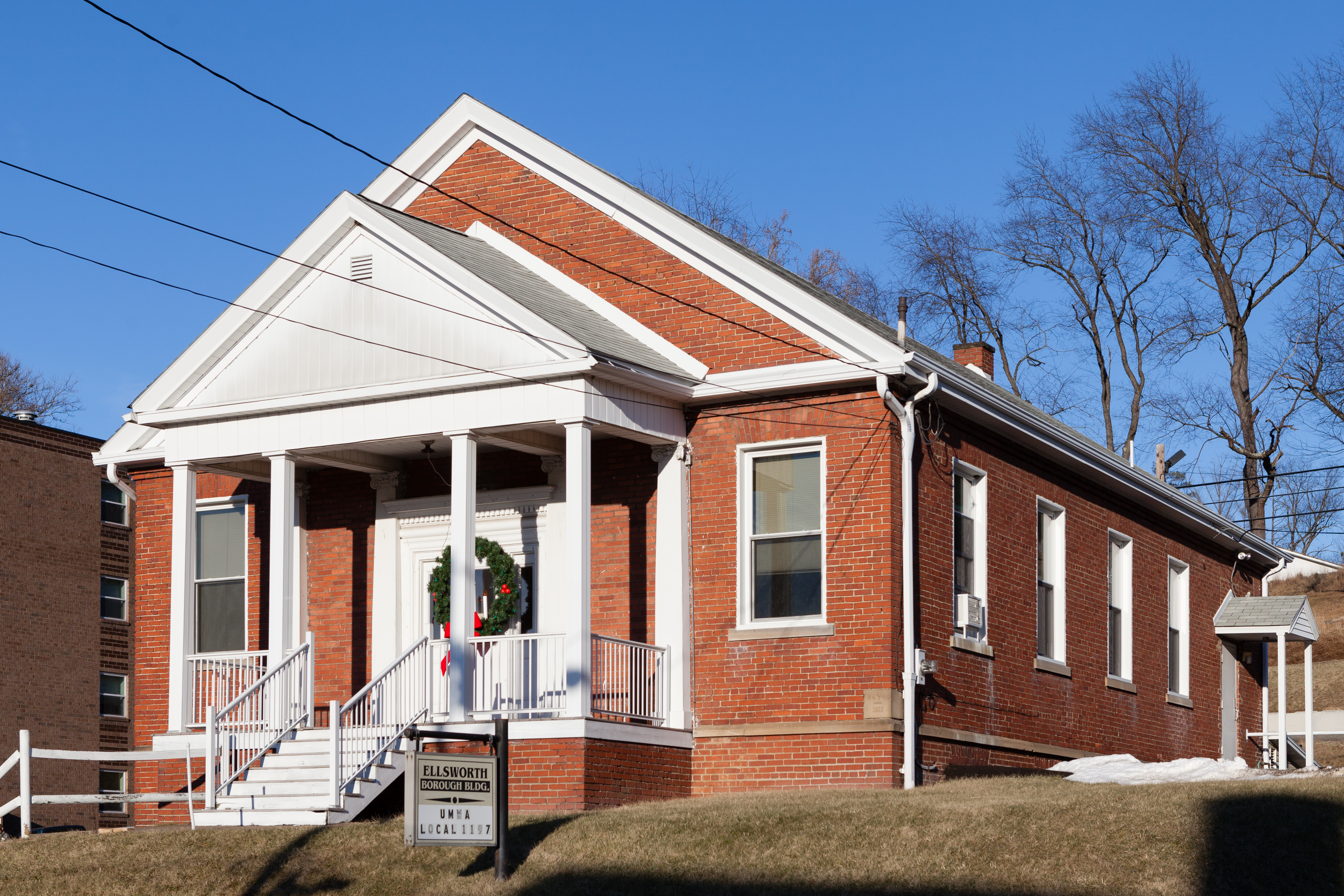
- Borough Building in 2015

- Location of Ellsworth in Washington County, Pennsylvania.

- Location of Ellsworth in Pennsylvania
- Coordinates: 40°6′21″N 80°1′14″W
- Country: United States
- State: Pennsylvania
- County: Washington
- Established: 1900

Government
  - Mayor: Joseph Daniel Kudlac

Area
  - Total: 0.76 sq mi (1.96 km^{2})
  - Land: 0.74 sq mi (1.91 km^{2})
  - Water: 0.015 sq mi (0.04 km^{2})

Population (2020)
  - Total: 945
  - Density: 1,278.5/sq mi (493.65/km^{2})
- Time zone: UTC-4 (EST)
  - Summer (DST): UTC-5 (EDT)
- ZIP code: 15331
- Area code: 724
- FIPS code: 42-23296

Ellsworth is a borough in Washington County, Pennsylvania, United States. The population was 947 at the 2020 census. The coal town was founded by James Ellsworth, who bought the land in 1890s, developed the Monongahela Railway, and sold the mines to Bethlehem Steel in the 1920s.

== Geography ==
Ellsworth is located at 40°6′21″N 80°1′14″W (40.105887, -80.020455).

According to the United States Census Bureau, the borough has a total area of 0.8 square miles (2.1 km^{2}), of which 0.7 square miles (1.8 km^{2}) is land and 0.04 square miles (0.10 km^{2}) (2.63%) is water.

== Demographics ==
Historical population
Census	Pop.	Note	%±
1910	2,084		—
1920	2,828		35.7%
1930	2,274		−19.6%
1940	1,974		−13.2%
1950	1,670		−15.4%
1960	1,456		−12.8%
1970	1,268		−12.9%
1980	1,228		−3.2%
1990	1,048		−14.7%
2000	1,083		3.3%
2010	1,027		−5.2%
2020	945		−8.0%
2025 (est.)	899	▼	−4.9%

At the 2000 census there were 1,083 people, 484 households, and 291 families living in the borough. The population density was 1,467.7 people per square mile (566.7 people/km^{2}). There were 528 housing units at an average density of 715.6 per square mile (276.3/km^{2}). The racial makeup of the borough was 96.03% White, 2.31% African American, 0.09% Asian, 0.09% from other races, and 1.48% from two or more races. Hispanic or Latino of any race were 0.65%.

Of the 484 households 23.8% had children under the age of 18 living with them, 44.8% were married couples living together, 12.2% had a female householder with no husband present, and 39.7% were non-families. 36.8% of households were one person and 20.7% were one person aged 65 or older. The average household size was 2.22 and the average family size was 2.91.

The age distribution was 20.6% under the age of 18, 7.8% from 18 to 24, 26.6% from 25 to 44, 24.0% from 45 to 64, and 21.0% 65 or older. The median age was 41 years. For every 100 females there were 92.4 males. For every 100 females age 18 and over, there were 88.6 males.

The median household income was $31,477 and the median family income was $40,385. Males had a median income of $35,764 versus $20,221 for females. The per capita income for the borough was $17,159. About 5.5% of families and 9.4% of the population were below the poverty line, including 6.3% of those under age 18 and 14.7% of those age 65 or over.
