= Coal Center, Pennsylvania =

Borough in Pennsylvania, US

- Borough
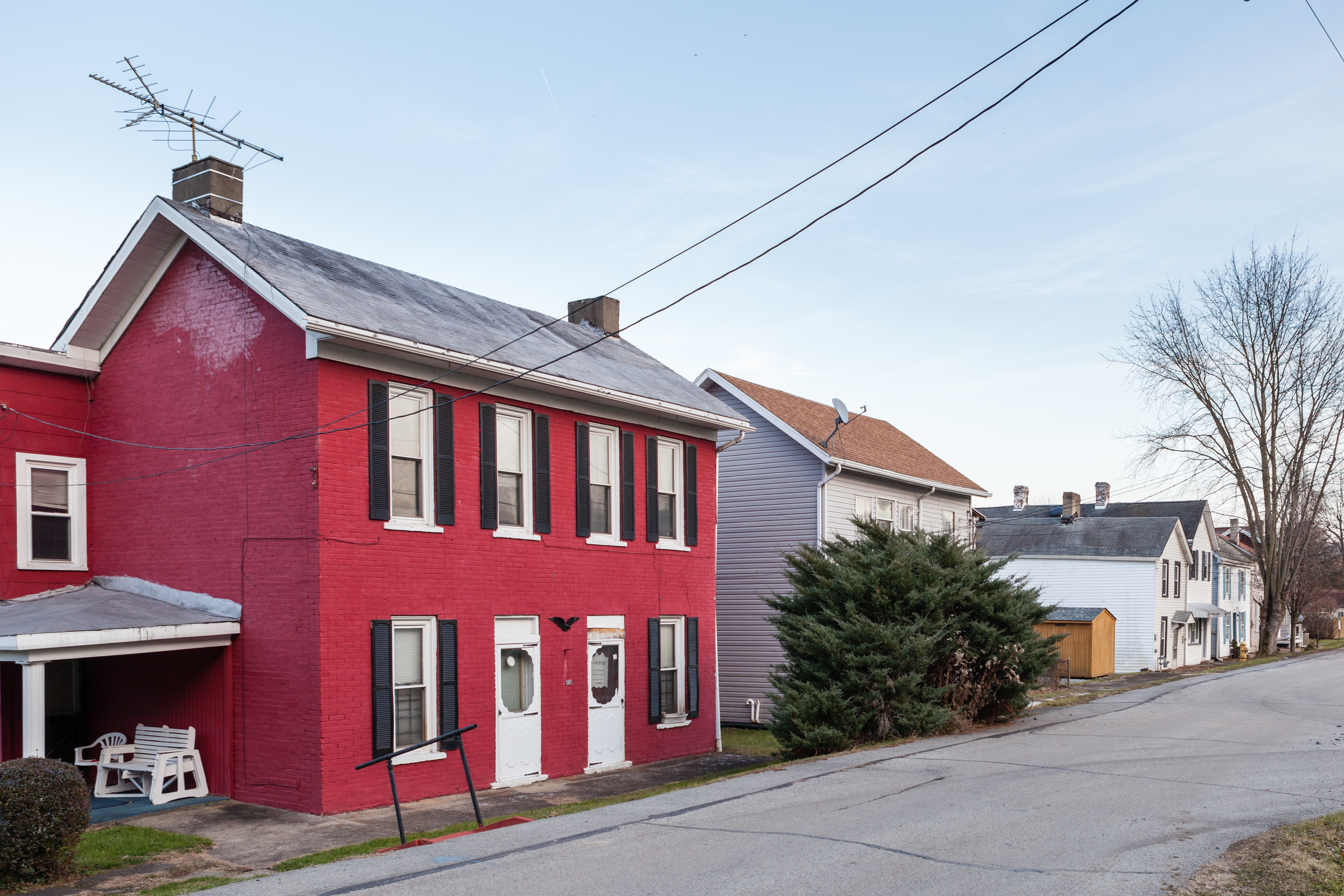
- Federal St between Green and Apple

- Location of Coal Center in Washington County, Pennsylvania.

- Location of Coal Center in Pennsylvania
- Coordinates: 40°4′11″N 79°54′3″W
- Country: United States
- State: Pennsylvania
- County: Washington
- Established: 1814

Government
  - Mayor: Frank Paterra

Area
  - Total: 0.14 sq mi (0.36 km^{2})
  - Land: 0.11 sq mi (0.29 km^{2})
  - Water: 0.023 sq mi (0.06 km^{2})

Population (2020)
  - Total: 110
  - Density: 966.0/sq mi (372.98/km^{2})
- Time zone: UTC-4 (EST)
  - Summer (DST): UTC-5 (EDT)
- Area code: 724
- FIPS code: 42-14568

Coal Center is a borough on the Monongahela River in Washington County, Pennsylvania, United States and part of the Pittsburgh metropolitan area since 1950. The population was 110 at the 2020 census.

== History ==
Developed in 1814 as Greenfield, the Borough was incorporated under that name on April 9, 1834. Enlarged on March 21, 1874, it was renamed Coal Center in January 1883.

== Geography ==
Coal Center is located at 40°4′11″N 79°54′3″W (40.069810, -79.900783).

According to the United States Census Bureau, the borough has a total area of 0.1 square miles (0.26 km^{2}), of which 0.1 square miles (0.26 km^{2}) is land and 0.04 square miles (0.10 km^{2}) (14.29%) is water.

=== Climate ===
The climate in this area is characterized by hot, humid summers and generally mild to cool winters. According to the Köppen Climate Classification system, Coal Center has a humid subtropical climate, abbreviated "Cfa" on climate maps.

== Surrounding and adjacent neighborhoods ==
Coal Center has only one land border, surrounded by California to the south, southwest and west. Across the Monongahela River to the northeast, Coal Center runs adjacent with Newell in Fayette County.

== Demographics ==
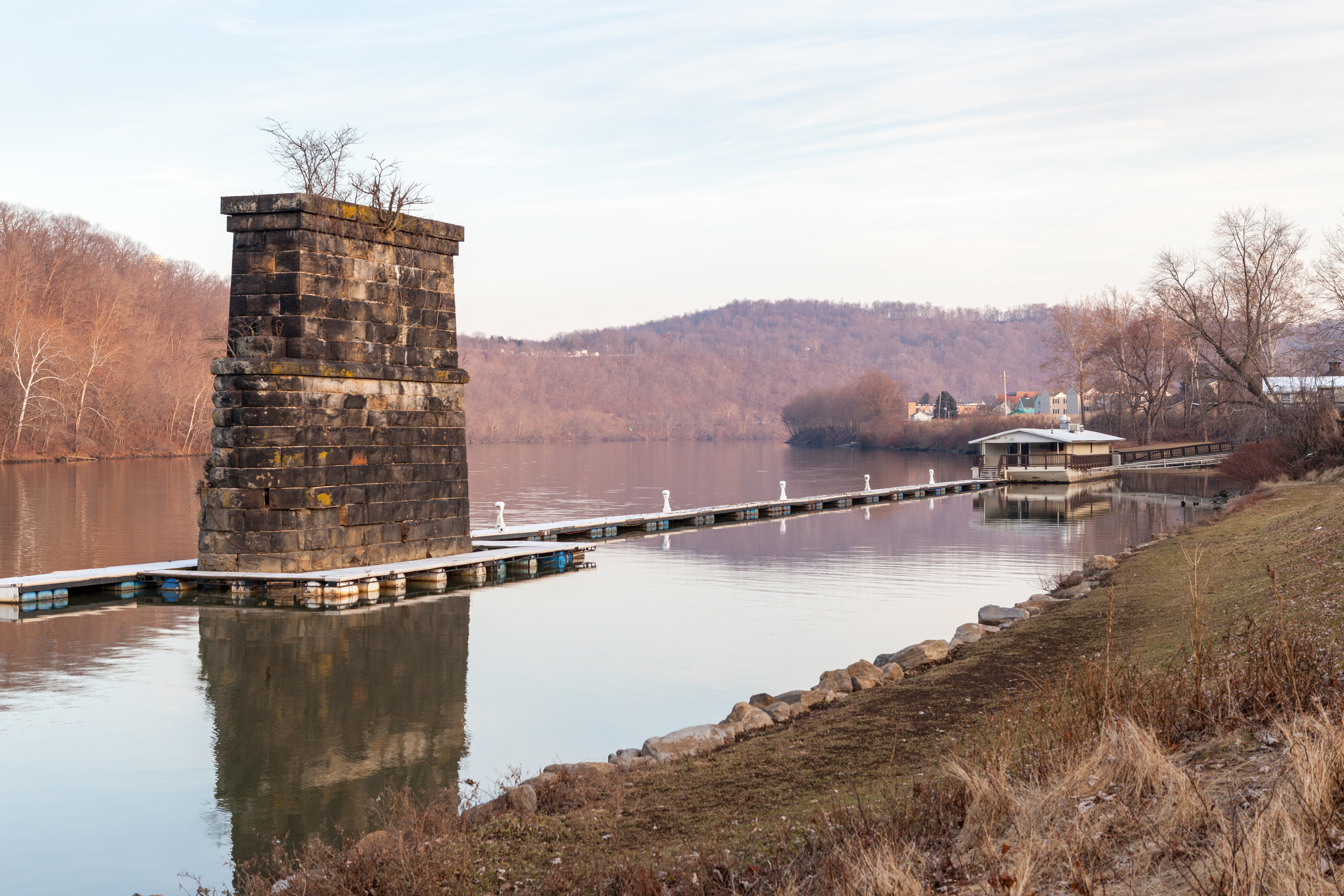
Dock on the Monongahela river

Historical population
Census	Pop.	Note	%±
1880	557		—
1890	569		2.2%
1900	742		30.4%
1910	816		10.0%
1920	724		−11.3%
1930	629		−13.1%
1940	705		12.1%
1950	584		−17.2%
1960	419		−28.3%
1970	317		−24.3%
1980	255		−19.6%
1990	184		−27.8%
2000	134		−27.2%
2010	139		3.7%
2020	110		−20.9%
2025 (est.)	110	▼	0.0%

As of the census of 2000, there were 134 people, 59 households, and 32 families residing in the borough. The population density was 1,178.5 people per square mile (455.0 people/km^{2}). There were 72 housing units at an average density of 633.2 per square mile (244.5/km^{2}). The racial makeup of the borough was 96.27% White, and 3.73% from two or more races. Hispanic or Latino of any race were 1.49% of the population. 10.5% were of Polish, 10.5% Russian, 8.9% English, 8.9% German, 8.9% Irish, 8.1% Croatian and 6.5% Italian ancestry according to Census 2000.

There were 59 households, out of which 22.0% had children under the age of 18 living with them, 28.8% were married couples living together, 25.4% had a female householder with no husband present, and 44.1% were non-families. 25.4% of all households were made up of individuals, and 15.3% had someone living alone who was 65 years of age or older. The average household size was 2.27 and the average family size was 2.79.

In the borough the population was spread out, with 17.2% under the age of 18, 20.1% from 18 to 24, 20.1% from 25 to 44, 24.6% from 45 to 64, and 17.9% who were 65 years of age or older. The median age was 38 years. For every 100 females, there were 69.6 males. For every 100 females age 18 and over, there were 58.6 males.

The median income for a household in the borough was $23,125, and the median income for a family was $28,125. Males had a median income of $26,250 versus $11,042 for females. The per capita income for the borough was $13,827. There were 18.2% of families and 28.1% of the population living below the poverty line, including 30.8% of under eighteens and 20.0% of those over 64.
