= Roscoe, Pennsylvania =

Borough in Pennsylvania, US

Roscoe
- Borough
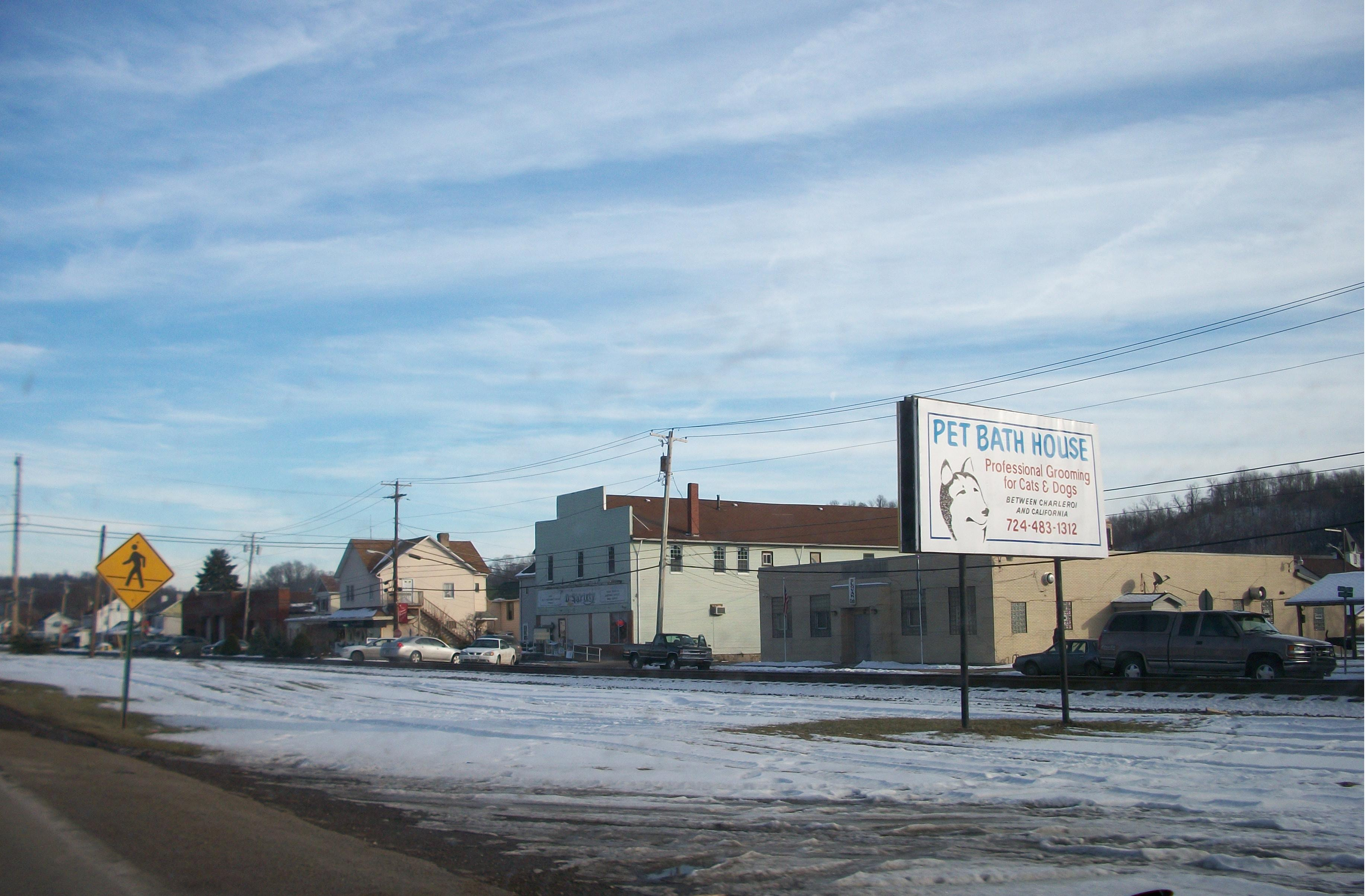

- Location of Roscoe in Washington County, Pennsylvania.

- Location of Roscoe in Pennsylvania
- Coordinates: 40°4′43″N 79°51′55″W
- Country: United States
- State: Pennsylvania
- County: Washington
- Established: 1894

Government
  - Mayor: Thomas J. Wilkinson

Area
  - Total: 0.25 sq mi (0.64 km^{2})
  - Land: 0.18 sq mi (0.47 km^{2})
  - Water: 0.066 sq mi (0.17 km^{2})

Population (2020)
  - Total: 720
  - Density: 3,957.6/sq mi (1,528.02/km^{2})
- Time zone: UTC-4 (EST)
  - Summer (DST): UTC-5 (EDT)
- Zip Code: 15477
- Area code: 724
- FIPS code: 42-66016

Roscoe is a borough in Washington County, Pennsylvania, United States. The population was 716 at the 2020 census.

== History ==
Roscoe became the home for many eastern European immigrants who came to the area to work in nearby coal mines. Slovaks, Poles, Serbs, Croatians, Italians, Hungarians, and Rusyns are all represented in census records of the area from 1880 onward.

The Allenport & Roscoe Street Railway was formed in 1903 and was purchased by Pittsburgh Railways to form part of their interurban line to Pittsburgh in 1906. The 2.4 miles (3.9 km) extension to Roscoe was completed on June 20, 1910. The line was closed in 1953.

The town was originally named Lucyville as early as 1860; however, the community changed its name to Roscoe in honor of the maiden name of a local resident, Mrs. Joseph Underwood,

=== Coal Mining ===
Roscoe and the surrounding area was home to numerous coal mines.

== Geography ==
Roscoe is located at 40°4′43″N 79°51′55″W (40.078513, -79.865225).

According to the United States Census Bureau, the borough has a total area of 0.2 square miles (0.5 km^{2}), of which 0.2 square miles (0.5 km^{2}) is land and 0.04 square miles (0.10 km^{2}) (16.67%) is water.

== Surrounding neighborhoods ==
Roscoe has two land borders: with Allenport to the north and east and Elco to the west. Across the Monongahela River to the south, Roscoe runs adjacent with Jefferson Township in Fayette County.

== Demographics ==
Historical population
Census	Pop.	Note	%±
1900	1,354		—
1910	1,450		7.1%
1920	1,480		2.1%
1930	1,310		−11.5%
1940	1,372		4.7%
1950	1,396		1.7%
1960	1,315		−5.8%
1970	1,176		−10.6%
1980	1,123		−4.5%
1990	872		−22.4%
2000	848		−2.8%
2010	812		−4.2%
2020	720		−11.3%
2025 (est.)	701	▼	−2.6%
U.S. Decennial Census

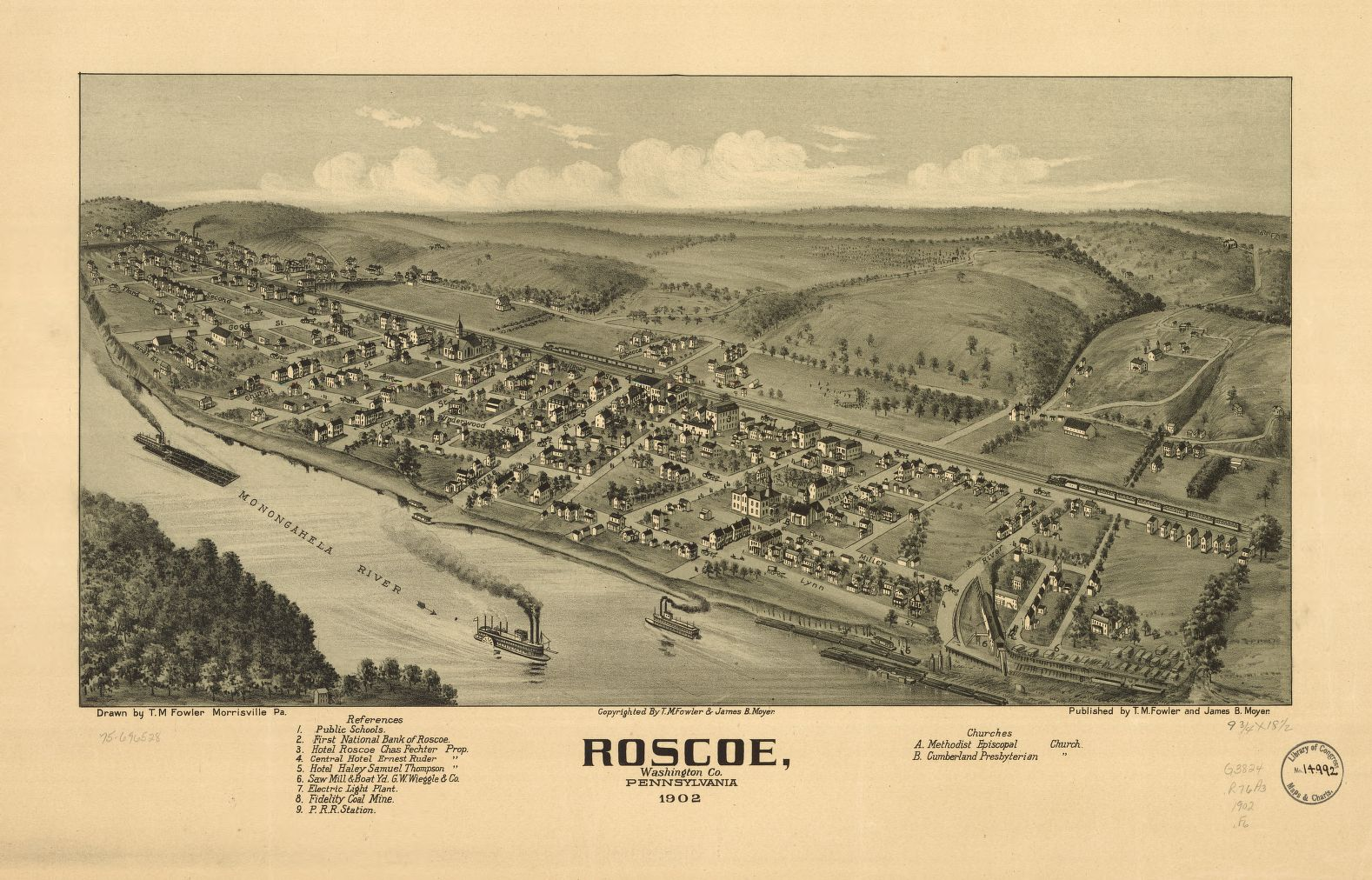
A 1902 pictorial map of Roscoe by Thaddeus Mortimer Fowler.

As of the census of 2000, there were 848 people, 398 households, and 243 families living in the borough. The population density was 4,256.0 people per square mile (1,643.3 people/km^{2}). There were 426 housing units at an average density of 2,138.0 per square mile (825.5/km^{2}). The racial makeup of the borough was 98.35% White, 0.94% Black, 0.12% from other races, and 0.59% from two or more races. Hispanic or Latino of any race were 0.35% of the population.

There were 398 households, out of which 20.6% had children under the age of 18 living with them, 47.0% were married couples living together, 11.3% had a female householder with no husband present, and 38.9% were non-families. 36.7% of all households were made up of individuals, and 19.6% had someone living alone who was 65 years of age or older. The average household size was 2.13 and the average family size was 2.77.

In the borough the population was spread out, with 17.8% under the age of 18, 6.8% from 18 to 24, 24.4% from 25 to 44, 25.7% from 45 to 64, and 25.2% who were 65 years of age or older. The median age was 46 years. For every 100 females, there were 80.8 males. For every 100 females age 18 and over, there were 80.6 males.

The median income for a household in the borough was $31,094, and the median income for a family was $41,250. Males had a median income of $33,167 versus $23,529 for females. The per capita income for the borough was $17,508. About 4.1% of families and 6.1% of the population were below the poverty line, including 8.4% of those under age 18 and 5.3% of those age 65 or over.
