= Allenport, Washington County, Pennsylvania =

Borough in Pennsylvania, US

Allenport, Pennsylvania
- Borough
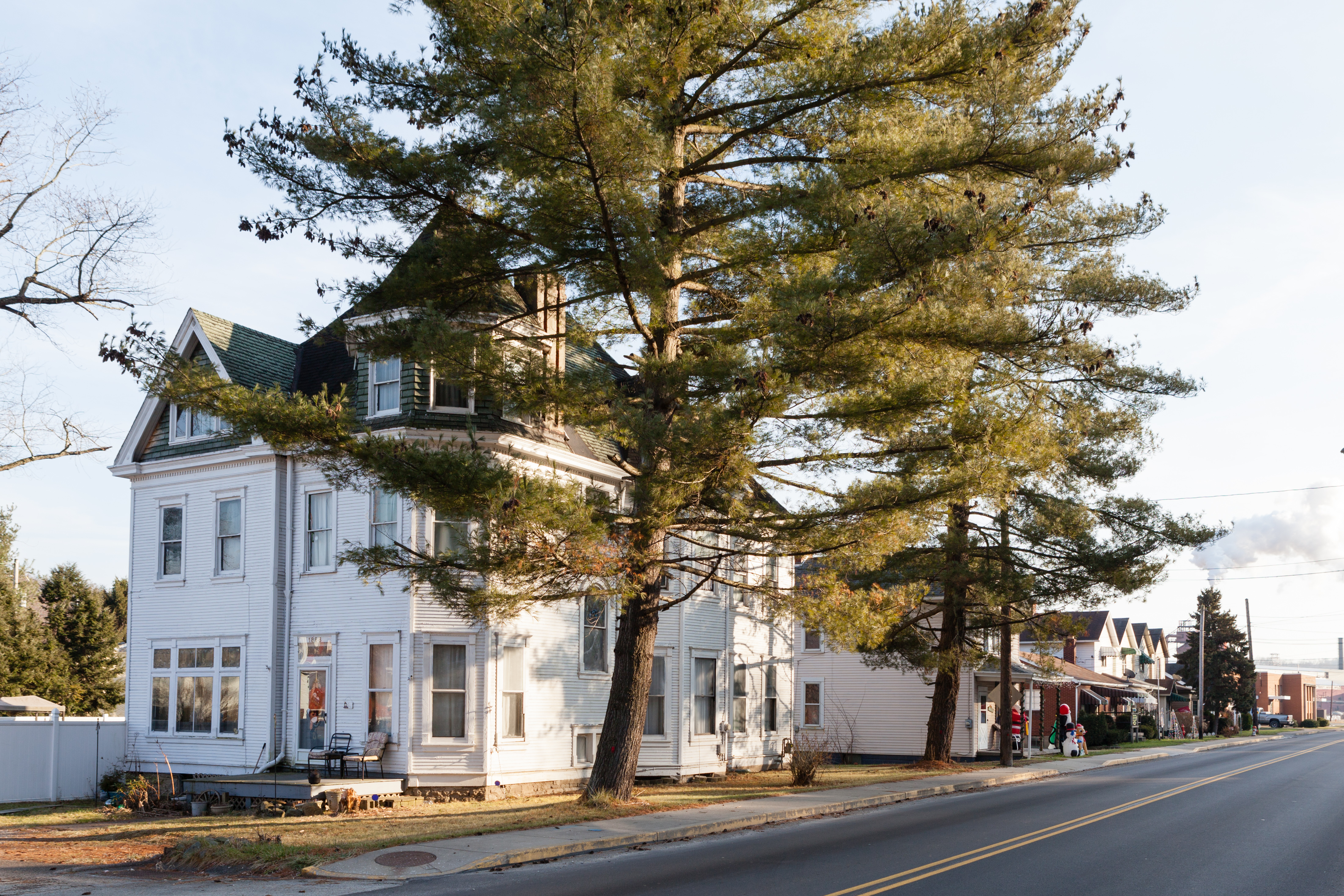
- Intersection of Main Street and Bridge Street
- Nicknames: Newtown, The Port
- Location of Allenport in Washington County, Pennsylvania.

- Location within Pennsylvania Location within the United States
- Coordinates: 40°5′47″N 79°50′43″W
- Country: United States
- State: Pennsylvania
- County: Washington
- Established: 1816

Government
  - Mayor: Albert Pipik

Area
  - Total: 2.22 sq mi (5.75 km^{2})
  - Land: 2.13 sq mi (5.51 km^{2})
  - Water: 0.093 sq mi (0.24 km^{2})

Population (2020)
  - Total: 484
  - Density: 227/sq mi (87.8/km^{2})
- Time zone: UTC-4 (EST)
  - Summer (DST): UTC-5 (EDT)
- Area code: 724
- FIPS code: 42-00988
- GNIS feature ID: 1215650

Allenport is a borough on the Monongahela River in Washington County, Pennsylvania, United States. The population was 483 at the 2020 census. It is part of the Pittsburgh metropolitan area.

== Geography ==
Allenport is located on State Route 88, approximately 3 miles (4.8 km) northeast of California, on the west bank of the Monongahela River.

According to the United States Census Bureau, the borough has a total area of 2.1 square miles (5.4 km^{2}), of which 2.0 square miles (5.2 km^{2}) is land and 0.2 square miles (0.5 km^{2}) (7.51%) is water.

== Government ==
The townspeople are represented by an elected mayor and borough council.

== Demographics ==
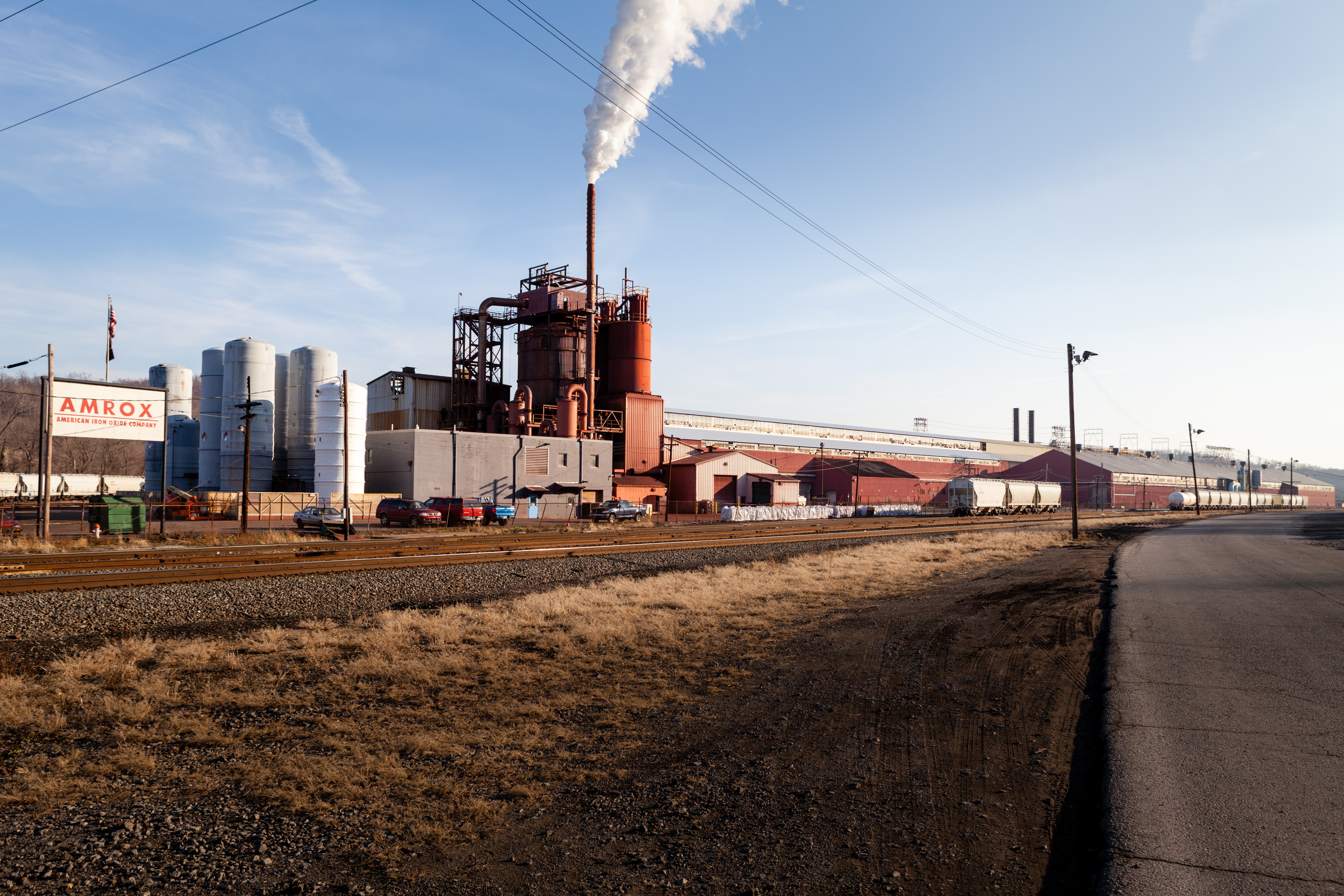
The American Iron Oxide Company (AMROX) plant and the former Wheeling-Pittsburgh Steel plant

Historical population
Census	Pop.	Note	%±
1880	163		—
1930	1,017		—
1940	1,078		6.0%
1950	923		−14.4%
1960	981		6.3%
1970	762		−22.3%
1980	735		−3.5%
1990	595		−19.0%
2000	549		−7.7%
2010	537		−2.2%
2020	484		−9.9%
2025 (est.)	469		−3.1%

As of the census of 2000, there were 549 people, 243 households, and 168 families living in the borough. The population density was 278.8 people per square mile (107.6 people/km^{2}). There were 261 housing units at an average density of 132.5 per square mile (51.2/km^{2}). The racial makeup of the borough was 99.27% White, 0.36% African American, and 0.36% from two or more races. Hispanic or Latino of any race were 0.36% of the population.

There were 243 households, out of which 19.8% had children under the age of 18 living with them, 55.6% were married couples living together, 9.9% had a female householder with no husband present, and 30.5% were non-families. 26.3% of all households were made up of individuals, and 16.0% had someone living alone who was 65 years of age or older. The average household size was 2.24 and the average family size was 2.69.

In the borough, the population was spread out, with 14.6% under the age of 18, 6.6% from 18 to 24, 29.0% from 25 to 44, 29.5% from 45 to 64, and 20.4% who were 65 years of age or older. The median age was 45 years. For every 100 females, there were 92.6 males. For every 100 females age 18 and over, there were 93.0 males.

The median income for a household in the borough was $28,462, and the median income for a family was $32,250. Males had a median income of $28,438 versus $26,563 for females. The per capita income for the borough was $17,702. About 6.5% of families and 7.8% of the population were below the poverty line, including 14.3% of those under age 18 and 3.7% of those age 65 or over.
