= Interstate 70 in Pennsylvania =

Section of Interstate highway in Pennsylvania, United States

Interstate 70
- I-70 highlighted in red

Route information
- Maintained by PennDOT and PTC
- Length: 167.92 mi (270.24 km)
- NHS: Entire route

Major junctions
- West end: I-70 at the West Virginia state line in West Alexander
- I-79 in Washington; PA Turnpike 43 in Fallowfield Township; PA 51 in Rostraver Township; I-76 Toll / Penna Turnpike from New Stanton to Breezewood; US 30 in Breezewood; US 522 near Warfordsburg
- East end: I-70 / US 522 at the Maryland state line near Hancock, MD

Location
- Country: United States
- State: Pennsylvania
- Counties: Washington, Westmoreland, Somerset, Bedford, Fulton

Highway system
- Interstate Highway System; Main; Auxiliary; Suffixed; Business; Future; Pennsylvania State Route System; Interstate; US; State; Scenic; Legislative
← PA 69	→ PA 70
← PA 125	PA 126	→ PA 127

Interstate 70 (I-70) is an Interstate Highway that is located in the Commonwealth of Pennsylvania in the United States. It runs east to west across the southwest part of Pennsylvania and serves the southern fringe of the Pittsburgh metropolitan area.

About half of this route is concurrent with I-76 on the Pennsylvania Turnpike, which is a toll road. This is the oldest segment of I-70 in Pennsylvania, having been completed in 1940, and is only one of two segments of I-70 that are tolled, with the other being the Kansas Turnpike.

I-70 is one of only a few Interstate Highways to have a traffic signal—in this case, with U.S. Route 30 (US 30) in Breezewood, where it leaves the Pennsylvania Turnpike and heads toward Maryland.

== Route description ==
Two segments of I-70 in Pennsylvania are not designed to modern Interstate standards: a 37-mile (60 km) segment from Washington to New Stanton and the aforementioned half-mile (0.80 km) signalized segment in Breezewood.

=== West Virginia to Washington ===
I-70 enters Pennsylvania from West Virginia, coming into Donegal Township, Washington County. The highway continues northeast as a four-lane freeway with a standard-size median up to Interstate Highway standards through rural areas of woodland and farmland, coming to its first junction at a partial cloverleaf interchange with State Route 3023 (SR 3023), to the southeast of unincorporated village of West Alexander.

Past this junction, the freeway begins to parallel US 40 on the northwest side of the road, before it enters a series of winding curves. From here, I-70 heads east to meet a weigh station and a welcome center in the eastbound direction, as well as an interchange with SR 3024 connecting to Pennsylvania Route 231 (PA 231) via US 40 in the borough of Claysville.

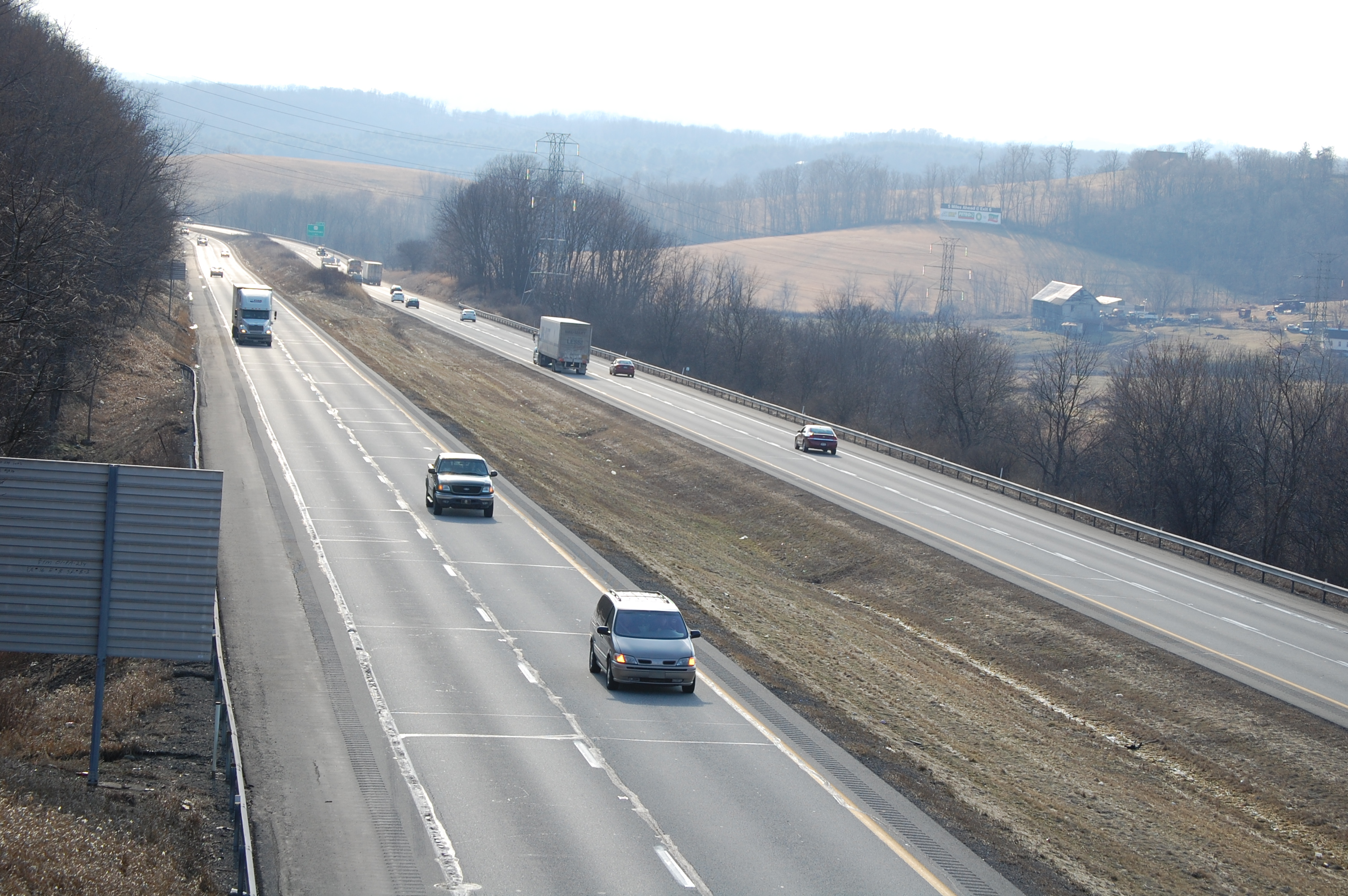
I-70 through Buffalo Township in Washington County

The freeway curves to a more east-northeasterly direction, where it briefly passes through the borough limits of Claysville, before briefly reentering Donegal Township. I-70 enters Buffalo Township, where it soon meets a pair of right-in/right-out ramps connecting to PA 221, which serves the unincorporated village of Taylorstown to the northeast, in adjacent Blaine Township. The freeway comes into North Franklin Township before crossing into Canton Township at its partial interchange with US 40 which lacks a westbound entrance; the interchange is adjacent to the Washington Crown Center shopping mall located to the southwest of the interchange.

From here, I-70 crosses over an abandoned portion of the Allegheny Valley Railroad's W&P Subdivision line and enters mixed areas of development on the outskirts of the city of Washington, which is also the county seat of Washington County. After passing through an interchange with Sheffield Avenue serving the industrial and commercial area of Jessop Place, the freeway enters the city limits of Washington, where it comes to a pair of right-in/right-out ramps that connect to PA 18. A short distance later, I-70 enters South Strabane Township and reaches its western junction with I-79 at a directional interchange, which heads north toward the city of Pittsburgh.

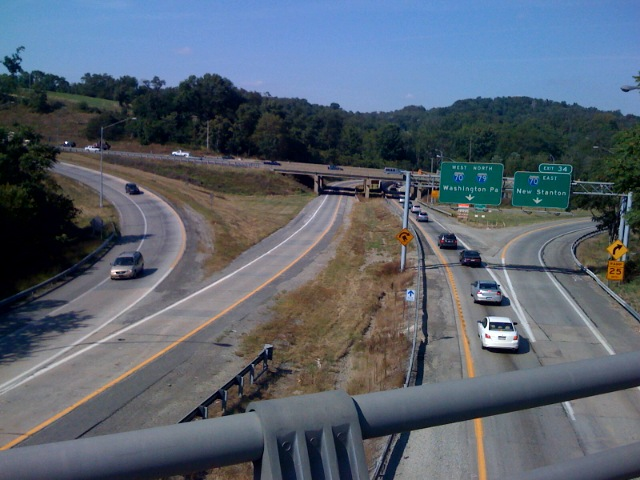
I-70 (on top) merges with I-79 going through Washington, Pennsylvania, shown in 2008 before reconstruction and flyover construction

The freeway turns southeast through the interchange and begins a concurrency with I-79. A Jersey barrier takes over in the highway's median as it comes to a diverging diamond interchange with US 19 in a commercial area surrounded by strip malls.

A short distance later, I-70/I-79 comes to a partial cloverleaf interchange with PA 136 to the northeast of the borough limits of East Washington that provides access to Washington & Jefferson College; a park and ride lot is located in the northeastern corner of the interchange. Past PA 136, the freeway heads back into rural areas with scattered residences, before reaching the eastern split between I-70 and I-79 at a directional interchange.

I-79 turns south toward the city of Morgantown, West Virginia, while I-70 continues east along the original roadway toward the borough of New Stanton in Westmoreland County.

=== Washington to New Stanton ===
East of I-79, I-70 downgrades to a highway substandard of modern Interstate standards. This section of I-70 (old I-70S) has several dated design features. The median narrows to the point that there are no shoulders between the median barrier and the passing lanes on both sides. On- and off-ramps at many of the interchanges are substandard in both length and geometry, which requires vehicles to decelerate in the travel lanes before entering the off-ramps, and also necessitates the use of stop signs on the on-ramps instead of yield signs. Several overpasses do not meet minimum clearance requirements, which has resulted in damage to and from overheight trucks. Total reconstruction efforts are ongoing that will upgrade most of this segment of I-70 and its interchanges to modern Interstate standards, and various projects are scheduled through the early 2020s.

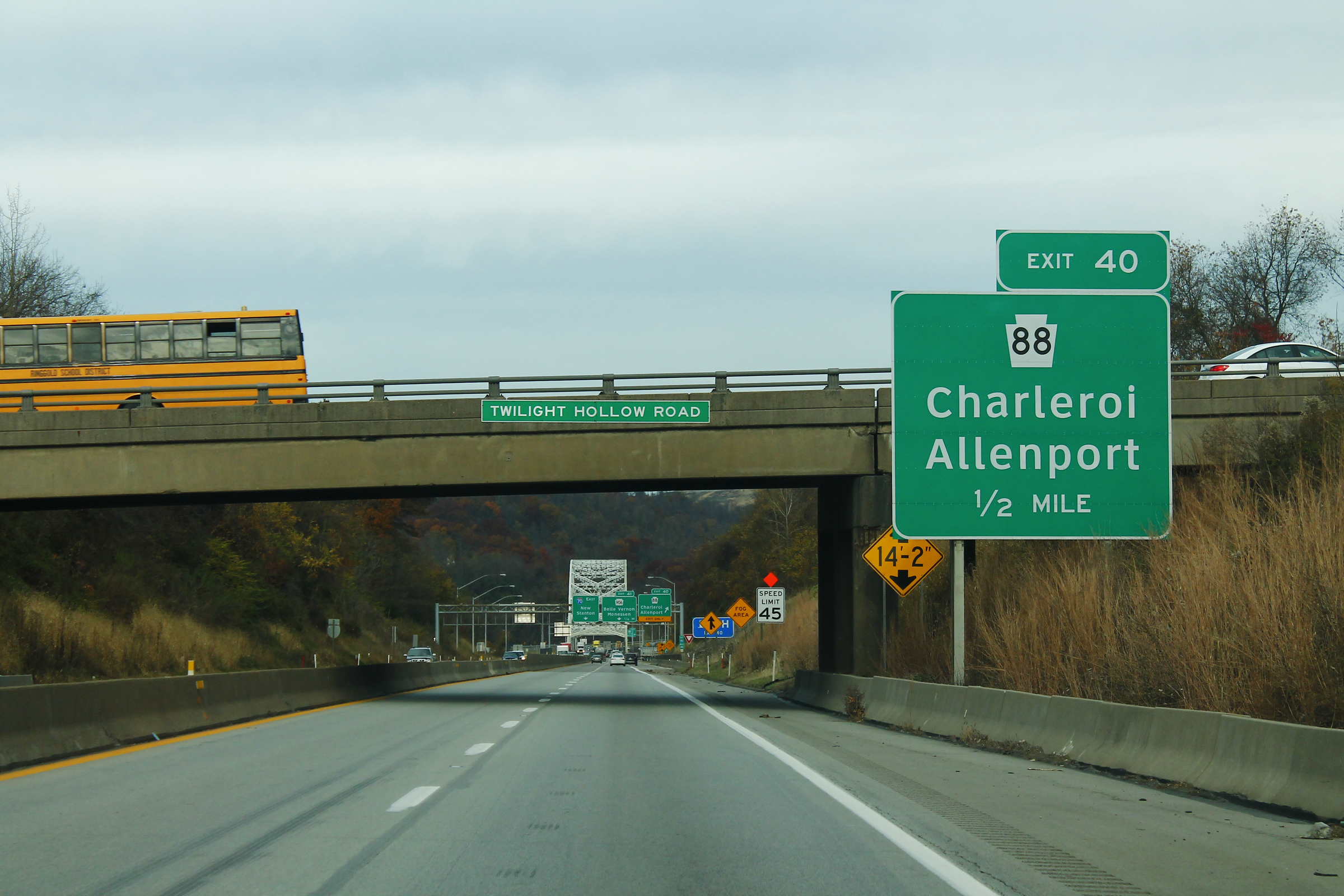
I-70 eastbound approaching the PA 88 exit in Speers

The first interchange that the freeway meets past I-79 is with PA 519, where the route crosses into Somerset Township. I-70 continues through areas of rural farmland with surroundings of wooded rolling hills and turns to the east-southeast, coming to interchanges with SR 1055 south of the hamlet of Dunningsville and McIllvaine Road southeast of the hamlet of Kammerer, in adjacent Nottingham Township, before reaching the borough limits of Bentleyville at the PA 917 interchange, which only contains an eastbound exit and westbound entrance. Shortly afterward, the freeway crosses over Norfolk Southern Railway's Ellsworth Secondary and meets modified right-in/right-out ramps to Wilson Road, which provides complete access to PA 917 and the center of Bentleyville to and from both directions.

Following Bentleyville, I-70 enters Fallowfield Township, where it has a complete diamond interchange with PA 481, a westbound exit and eastbound entrance to Twin Bridges Road to the northeast of the hamlet of Lover, and a full cloverleaf interchange with the Mon–Fayette Expressway (PA 43), as the route descends into the valley of the Monongahela River. From here, the freeway curves east-northeast into the borough of Twilight, before crossing into the borough of Speers at the interchange with Maple Drive/Twilight Hollow Road.

At this point, I-70 meets PA 88 at a pair of right-in/right-out ramps, prior to crossing over Norfolk Southern Railway's Mon Line, the Monongahela River, and CSX Transportation's Mon Subdivision on the Belle Vernon Bridge, where the route leaves both Speers and Washington County.

Beyond the Belle Vernon Bridge, the route enters Westmoreland County within Rostraver Township, just skirting the edge of Fayette County, missing it by a few dozen feet. Here, it has a partial cloverleaf interchange with PA 906, before it crosses into the borough of North Belle Vernon and interchanges with Fayette Street, to the northeast of the borough center.

From this point, the freeway heads back into Rostraver Township where it meets PA 201 at a partial cloverleaf interchange northeast of the community of Lynnwood-Pricedale that also provides access to PA 837. I-70 continues through wooded areas with nearby development, reaching an interchange with SR 3011 north of the hamlet of Arnold City in adjacent Washington Township, Fayette County, before coming to a newly constructed diverging diamond interchange with PA 51 as the route begins to enter the valley of the Youghiogheny River.

Past PA 51, the route crosses the Smithton High-Level Bridge over the Youghiogheny River and CSX Transportation's Keystone Subdivision, where it enters South Huntingdon Township. From here, I-70 interchanges with SR 3031 north of the borough of Smithton, PA 31 at cloverleaf to the northwest of the Pittsburgh Renaissance Festival grounds, and SR 3010 to the southeast of the unincorporated village of Yukon, before it comes into Sewickley Township. In this area, the freeway has an interchange with Waltz Mill Road to the south of the borough of Madison, before it passes through Hempfield Township prior to entering New Stanton. Within the borough limits, I-70 has a dumbbell interchange with SR 3089, before it exits the mainline freeway at a trumpet interchange, to come to a toll plaza for the New Stanton interchange on the Pennsylvania Turnpike (I-76).

At this point, the mainline freeway continues east to a cloverleaf junction between US 119 and the southern terminus of PA 66. I-70 itself passes through the toll plaza and comes to another trumpet interchange, where the Interstate merges onto the turnpike and heads east towards Harrisburg and Philadelphia. In the opposite direction, the turnpike heads northwest toward Pittsburgh, then becomes the Ohio Turnpike, which continues towards Cleveland.

=== Pennsylvania Turnpike concurrency ===
For 86 miles (138 km) from New Stanton to Breezewood, I-70 shares a concurrency with I-76 along the Pennsylvania Turnpike. I-70 passes through a wind farm in Somerset County and close to the 9/11 Flight 93 National Memorial in Shanksville. It then has an indirect connection to I-99 in Bedford County before reaching the eastern end of its concurrency with the Turnpike in Breezewood.

=== Breezewood to Maryland ===
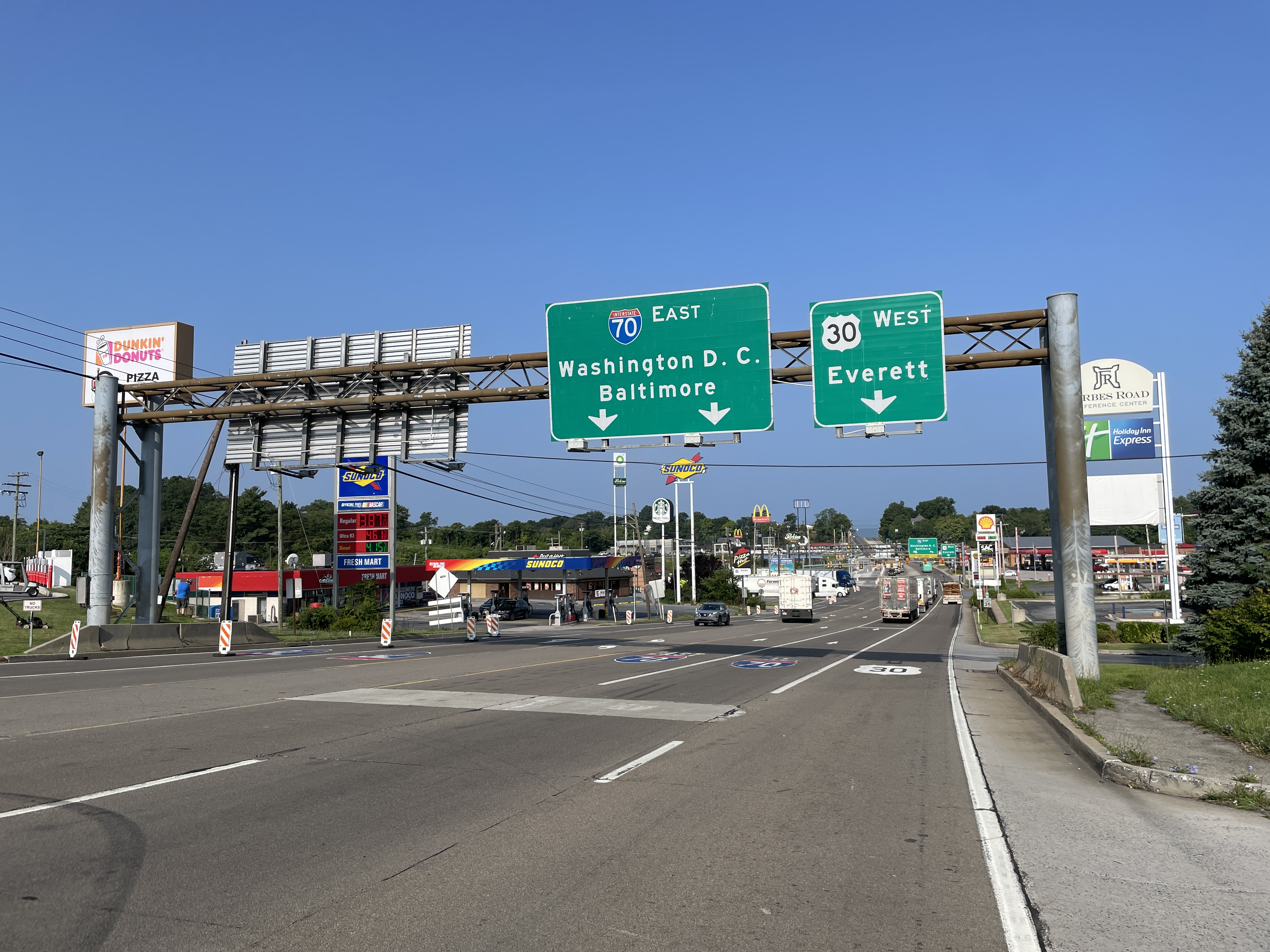
View east along the surface portion of I-70 and west along US 30 in Breezewood

I-70 splits from the Pennsylvania Turnpike at the Breezewood Interchange in East Providence Township, Bedford County. The turnpike continues east toward Harrisburg and Philadelphia, while I-70 passes through a toll plaza and travels along the turnpike's old alignment to the Breezewood Interchange's original location, where it has a partial trumpet interchange with US 30. Eastbound I-70 merges onto westbound US 30 to form a half-mile (0.80 km) wrong-way concurrency through the community of Breezewood. This section of I-70 is one of the few instances of where an Interstate Highway follows a road that lacks grade separation and includes traffic signals. I-70 follows US 30 west along a five-lane highway with a center turn lane through commercial areas in Breezewood before it splits from US 30 and turns left onto another freeway alignment. US 30, meanwhile, continues west toward the borough of Everett.

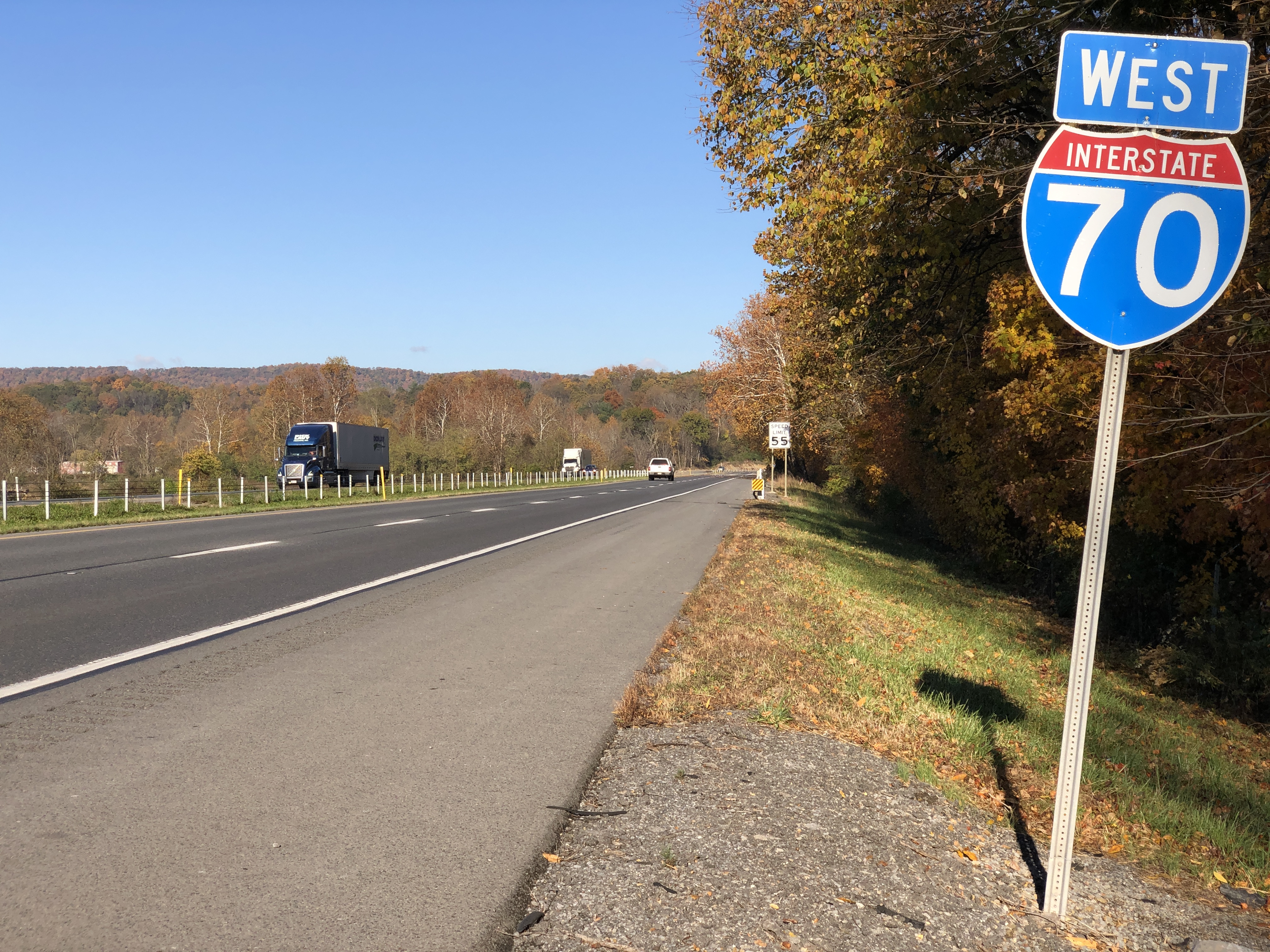
I-70 westbound past US 522 in Warfordsburg

Beyond US 30, I-70 heads south and becomes a four-lane freeway that once again conforms to modern Interstate standards. The median widens, before the freeway crosses over its preceding carriageways and under the Pennsylvania Turnpike. Shortly past the turnpike underpass, there is an interchange with South Breezewood Road before I-70 curves to cross Rays Hill, crossing into Fulton County, and coming to a pair of right-in/right-out ramps with the southern terminus of PA 915 in the unincorporated village of Crystal Spring, in Brush Creek Township. The freeway continues through a valley of farmland and comes to an eastbound rest area on the western slope of Town Hill, which the highway crosses at an oblique angle. In the middle of the mountain crossing, I-70 has another pair of right-in/right-out ramps with the northern terminus of PA 643, and then descends along the length of its eastern slope into another rural valley. Within this valley, the freeway enters Union Township, turns generally more southeast and interchanges with the northern terminus of PA 731, east of the unincorporated village of Amaranth.

Past PA 731, I-70 crosses Sideling Hill and comes into Bethel Township. The route heads through forested and mountainous surroundings in the watershed of Tonoloway Creek, before coming to an interchange with the western end of the highway's concurrency with US 522 in the unincorporated town of Warfordsburg. Southbound US 522 merges onto eastbound I-70 and the two routes run concurrent across the Mason–Dixon line into Washington County, Maryland.

== History ==
Pennsylvania Route 126
- Location: Warfordsburg–Breezewood
- Existed: 1928–1964

Pennsylvania Route 71 Alternate
- Location: Washington–New Stanton
- Existed: 1957–1963

By 1947, I-70's route across Pennsylvania was included in the planned Interstate Highway System. The route from West Virginia split at Washington, with one branch heading northeast to meet the Pennsylvania Turnpike near Pittsburgh and the other heading east, bypassing Pittsburgh to the south (via a planned bypass of PA 71) to the New Stanton interchange. The piece south from the Breezewood interchange into Maryland was also included in the network.

The route between US 30 in Breezewood and US 522 in Warfordsburg was originally known as Pennsylvania Route 126 (PA 126). In 1957, preliminary numbers were assigned; the longer route via Pittsburgh (now I-79 and I-376) became the main line of I-70, while the southern bypass (now I-70) became Interstate 70S (I-70S). The original alignment is now known as Old 126 or Breezewood Road.

The section of present-day I-70 between PA 519 near Washington and New Stanton was built as a four-lane divided highway known as the "Express Highway"; this road was assigned the temporary PA 71 Alternate (PA 71 Alt.) designation in 1957 and would be designated as I-70S following the completion of additional connecting roads in the Interstate Highway System. On July 15, 1960, I-70 was designated onto the Penn-Lincoln Parkway.

A southern extension of I-79 (which had previously only run from Erie south to Pittsburgh) to Charleston, West Virginia, in 1963 resulted in changes to I-70. On February 26, 1964, as part of the formation of I-76 (east of Downtown Pittsburgh), the American Association of State Highway and Transportation Officials (AASHTO) approved a rerouting of I-70 along I-70S. The former I-70 became I-79 from Washington to downtown Pittsburgh and I-76 to and along the Turnpike to New Stanton. This brought the routing of I-70 to its present form.

In 2011, the Pennsylvania Department of Transportation (PennDOT) began preliminary work for a total reconstruction of I-70 between the West Virginia state line and New Stanton, a segment consisting of 58-mile (93 km) of highway. Planned improvements included overpass replacements, a new roadbed, a wider median, interchange reconstruction, electronic ITS signage, and widening the I-70/I-79 concurrency in Washington to six lanes. Several projects have been completed under this initiative.

Two major interchange projects occurred in conjunction with the I-70/I-79 widening. The first was a reconfiguration of the east/south split between I-70 and I-79, which replaced the one-lane, low-speed loop ramp from I-79 northbound to I-70 westbound, with a two-lane, high-speed flyover ramp. The second replaced an obsolete cloverleaf interchange at I-70/I-79 and Murtland Avenue (US 19) with the first diverging diamond interchange in Pennsylvania.

== Future ==
In September 2024, the Pennsylvania Turnpike Commission announced that it will construct a direct connection for I-70 to enter the Pennsylvania Turnpike at Breezewood. This will eliminate a controlled-access gap on the route. Construction is not expected to start until at least 2033.

As of 2026, work is ongoing on the West Virginia to New Stanton segment.

== Exit list ==
County	Location	mi	km	Old exit	New exit	Destinations	Notes
Washington	Donegal Township	0.000	0.000	–	–	I-70 west – Wheeling	Continuation into West Virginia
Washington	Donegal Township	0.776	1.249	1	1	West Alexander	
Washington	Donegal Township	5.648	9.090	2	6	To PA 231 – Claysville	
Washington	Buffalo Township	10.964	17.645	3	11	PA 221 – Taylorstown	
Washington	North Franklin–Canton township line	14.940	24.044	4	15	US 40 (Chestnut Street)	Access to Washington Crown Center
Washington	Canton Township	16.027	25.793	5	16	Jessop Place	
Washington	Washington	16.451	26.475	6	17	PA 18 (Jefferson Avenue)	
Washington	South Strabane Township	17.546	28.238	–	18	I-79 north – Pittsburgh	Western end of I-79 concurrency; exit 38 on I-79
Washington	South Strabane Township	18.597	29.929	7	19	US 19 (Murtland Avenue)	Diverging diamond interchange
Washington	South Strabane Township	18.945	30.489	8	20	PA 136 (Beau Street)	
Washington	South Strabane Township	21.083	33.930	–	21	I-79 south – Waynesburg, Morgantown	Eastern end of I-79 concurrency; exit 34 on I-79
Washington	Somerset Township	24.643	39.659	9	25	PA 519 – Eighty Four, Glyde	
Washington	Somerset Township	27.503	44.262	10	27	Dunningsville	
Washington	Somerset Township	30.592	49.233	11	31	Kammerer	
Washington	Somerset Township–Bentleyville line	32.421	52.177	12A	32A	PA 917 – Ginger Hill	Eastbound exit and westbound entrance
Washington	Bentleyville–Fallowfield Township line	32.780	52.754	12B	32B	To PA 917 – Bentleyville, Ginger Hill	Ginger Hill not signed eastbound
Washington	Fallowfield Township	35.201	56.651	13	35	PA 481 – Monongahela, Centerville	
Washington	Fallowfield Township	36.396	58.574	14	36	Lover	Westbound exit and eastbound entrance
Washington	Fallowfield Township	37.555– 37.571	60.439– 60.465	15	37	PA Turnpike 43 – California, Pittsburgh	Signed as exits 37A (south) and 37B (north); exits 36A-B on PA 43
Washington	Twilight–Speers line	39.877	64.176	16	39	Speers	
Washington	Speers	40.248	64.773	17	40	PA 88 – Charleroi, Allenport	
Monongahela River		40.697	65.495	Belle Vernon Bridge			
Westmoreland	Rostraver Township	40.776	65.623	18	41	PA 906 – Belle Vernon, Monessen	Eastbound entrance and exit ramps are partially within Belle Vernon borough, Fayette County
Westmoreland	North Belle Vernon	41.528	66.833	19	42	North Belle Vernon	
Westmoreland	Rostraver Township	42.083	67.726	19A	42A	Monessen	Westbound exit only
Westmoreland	Rostraver Township	42.742	68.787	20	43	PA 201 to PA 837 – Donora, Fayette City	Signed as exits 43A (south) and 43B (north) westbound
Westmoreland	Rostraver Township	44.216	71.159	21	44	Arnold City	
Westmoreland	Rostraver Township	46.478	74.799	22	46	PA 51 – Uniontown, Pittsburgh	Diverging diamond interchange
Westmoreland	South Huntingdon Township	48.957	78.789	23	49	Smithton	
Westmoreland	South Huntingdon Township	51.257	82.490	24	51	PA 31 – Mount Pleasant, West Newton	
Westmoreland	South Huntingdon Township	53.203	85.622	25	53	Yukon	
Westmoreland	Sewickley Township	53.923	86.781	25A	54	Madison	
Westmoreland	New Stanton	56.978	91.697	26	57	New Stanton, Hunker	
Westmoreland	New Stanton	57.564	92.640	27	58	To US 119 / PA Turnpike 66 north – Greensburg, Connellsville, Delmont	Delmont not signed eastbound; exit number not signed westbound; access via SR 3091; last eastbound exit before toll
Westmoreland	New Stanton	57.765	92.964	New Stanton Toll Plaza (E-ZPass or toll-by-plate)			
Westmoreland	New Stanton	57.992	93.329	8	75	I-76 Toll west / Penna Turnpike west – Pittsburgh	Western end of I-76 / Turnpike concurrency; exit number not signed eastbound; New Stanton Interchange
Westmoreland	Donegal Township	73.292	117.952	9	91	PA 31 / PA 711 – Ligonier, Uniontown	Donegal Interchange
Somerset	Somerset	92.512	148.884	10	110	To US 219 – Somerset, Johnstown	Access via PA 601; Somerset Interchange
Somerset	Stonycreek–Allegheny township line	105.302– 106.502	169.467– 171.398	Allegheny Mountain Tunnel			
Bedford	Bedford Township	128.102	206.160	11	146	To I-99 north / US 220 – Bedford, Altoona	Access via US 220 Bus.; Bedford Interchange
Bedford	East Providence Township	144.102	231.910	12	161	I-76 Toll east / Penna Turnpike east – Harrisburg	Eastern end of I-76 / Turnpike concurrency; exit number not signed westbound; Breezewood Interchange
Bedford	East Providence Township	144.402	232.392	Breezewood Toll Plaza (E-ZPass or toll-by-plate)			
Bedford	East Providence Township	146.706	236.100	–	–	US 30 east – McConnellsburg	Eastern end of US 30 concurrency; last westbound exit before toll
Bedford	East Providence Township	146.706	236.100	Eastern end of freeway section			
Bedford	East Providence Township	147.000	236.574	–	147	US 30 west – Breezewood, Everett	Western end of US 30 concurrency
Bedford	East Providence Township	147.000	236.574	Western end of freeway section			
Bedford	East Providence Township	148.465	238.931	29	149	To US 30 west – South Breezewood, Everett	Access via S. Breezewood Rd.; no westbound entrance; signed for US 30/Everett westbound, S. Breezewood eastbound
Fulton	Brush Creek Township	150.948	242.927	30	151	PA 915 – Crystal Spring	
Fulton	Brush Creek Township	155.510	250.269	31	156	PA 643 – Town Hill	
Fulton	Union Township	163.007	262.334	32	163	PA 731 south – Amaranth	
Fulton	Bethel Township	167.724	269.926	33	168	US 522 north – Warfordsburg	Western end of US 522 concurrency
Fulton	Bethel Township	170.281	274.041	–	–	I-70 east / US 522 south – Hancock	Continuation into Maryland
1.000 mi = 1.609 km; 1.000 km = 0.621 mi: Concurrency terminus; Electronic toll collection; Incomplete access

== See also ==
Interstate 70
Previous state: West Virginia	Pennsylvania	Next state: Maryland
