= Pennsylvania Route 201 =

State highway in Pennsylvania, US

Pennsylvania Route 201
- Pennsylvania Route 201 highlighted in red

Route information
- Maintained by PennDOT
- Length: 25.2 mi (40.6 km)
- Existed: September 1964–present

Major junctions
- South end: US 119 / PA 711 / PA 711 Truck in Connellsville
- PA 819 at Vanderbilt; PA 51 near Perryopolis; I-70 in Rostraver Township; PA 51 in Rostraver Township
- North end: PA 136 in Rostraver Township

Location
- Country: United States
- State: Pennsylvania
- Counties: Fayette, Westmoreland

Highway system
- Pennsylvania State Route System; Interstate; US; State; Scenic; Legislative
← PA 199	→ US 202

Pennsylvania Route 201, designated by the Pennsylvania Department of Transportation as State Route 201, abbreviated PA 201, is a 25-mile-long (40 km) south-north state highway located in Southwestern Pennsylvania in the counties of Fayette and Westmoreland. The southern terminus is at U.S. Route 119 (US 119)/PA 711 in Connellsville. The highway heads northwest and meets up with PA 51 twice at two separate locations and Interstate 70 (I-70) in Rostraver Township. The northern terminus is at PA 136 in Rostraver Township.

PA 201 was designated in September 1964 replacing a longer section of PA 711 from Connellsville to Rostraver Township.

== Route description ==
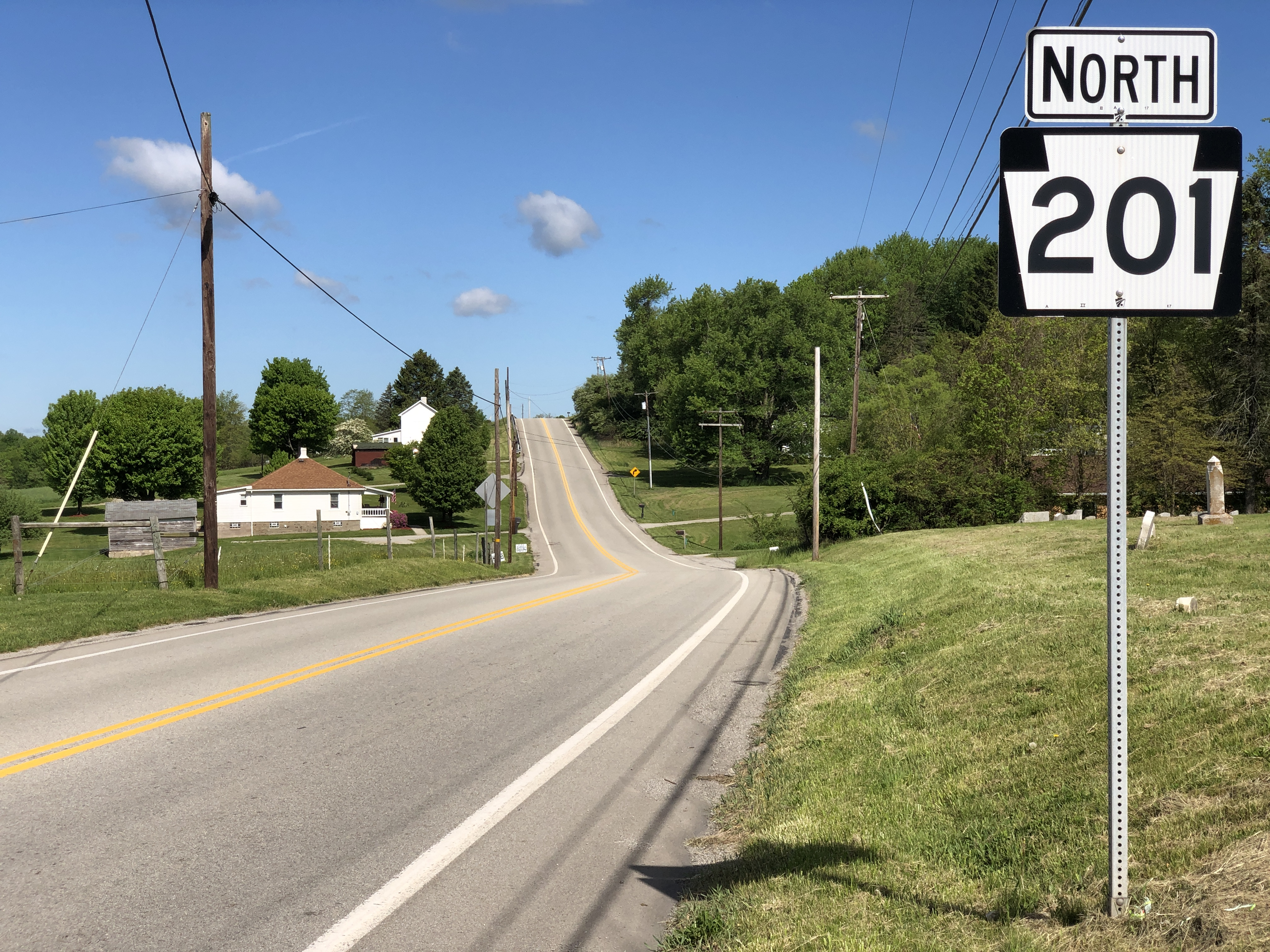
PA 201 northbound in Franklin Township

PA 201 begins at an intersection with US 119 and PA 711 in the western part of the city of Connellsville in Fayette County. Named Vanderbilt Road, PA 201 quickly exits the city and heads northwest toward the borough of Vanderbilt. Immediately after entering Vanderbilt, PA 201 intersects the southern terminus of PA 819 and continues to the south and west through the borough, becoming Flatwoods Road to the west. In Perry Township, just south of Star Junction, PA 201 intersects PA 51 at a cloverleaf interchange. West of this point, PA 201 takes a more northerly route toward the borough of Fayette City.

In Fayette City, PA 201 runs north as the one-way pair of Main and 2nd Streets, then heads north toward Lynnwood and Pricedale. In Pricedale, PA 201 becomes Rostraver Road and serves a shopping center before intersecting I-70 at exit 43. Now in Westmoreland County, PA 201 turns northeast toward the borough of West Newton. The route passes the Mon Valley Education Center of Westmoreland County Community College and Belle Vernon Area High School before intersecting PA 51 again at a partial interchange. The route continues for another couple miles before ending at an intersection with PA 136 less than a quarter of a mile west of West Newton.

== History ==
In 1928, PA 71 was signed as the section from I-70 South at the Donora/Monessen Interchange to the current northern terminus at PA 136 in West Newton. Also at that time, the stretch of road south of I-70 was known as PA 711. In September 1964, the state re-designated the section of PA 711 from Connellsville on west as PA 201.

== Major intersections ==
County	Location	mi	km	Destinations	Notes
Fayette	Connellsville	0.0	0.0	US 119 / PA 711 Truck north (8th Street/9th Street) PA 711 north (West Crawford Avenue)	Southern termini of PA 201 and PA 711
Fayette	Vanderbilt	3.6	5.8	PA 819 north (Dawson Road) – Dawson	Southern terminus of PA 819
Fayette	Perry Township	10.5	16.9	PA 51 (Pittsburgh Road) – Uniontown, Pittsburgh	Interchange
Fayette	Washington Township	16.6	26.7	PA 906 north (Naomi Road)	Southern terminus of PA 906
Westmoreland	Rostraver Township	19.0	30.6	I-70 – Washington, Belle Vernon, New Stanton	Exit 43 (I-70)
Westmoreland	Rostraver Township	22.8	36.7	PA 51 – Pittsburgh, Uniontown	Interchange
Westmoreland	Rostraver Township	25.2	40.6	PA 136 (West Main Street)	Northern terminus of PA 201
1.000 mi = 1.609 km; 1.000 km = 0.621 mi
