= Pennsylvania Route 906 =

State highway in Pennsylvania, US

Pennsylvania Route 906

Route information
- Maintained by PennDOT
- Length: 10.577 mi (17.022 km)

Major junctions
- South end: PA 201 in Washington Township
- I-70 in Rostraver Township
- North end: PA 136 in Forward Township

Location
- Country: United States
- State: Pennsylvania
- Counties: Fayette, Westmoreland, Allegheny

Highway system
- Pennsylvania State Route System; Interstate; US; State; Scenic; Legislative
| ← PA 905 | → PA 907 |

Pennsylvania Route 906 (PA 906) is a 10.6-mile-long (17.1 km) state highway located in Fayette, Westmoreland, and Allegheny counties in Pennsylvania. The southern terminus is at PA 201 in Washington Township. The northern terminus is at PA 136 in Forward Township.

== Route description ==
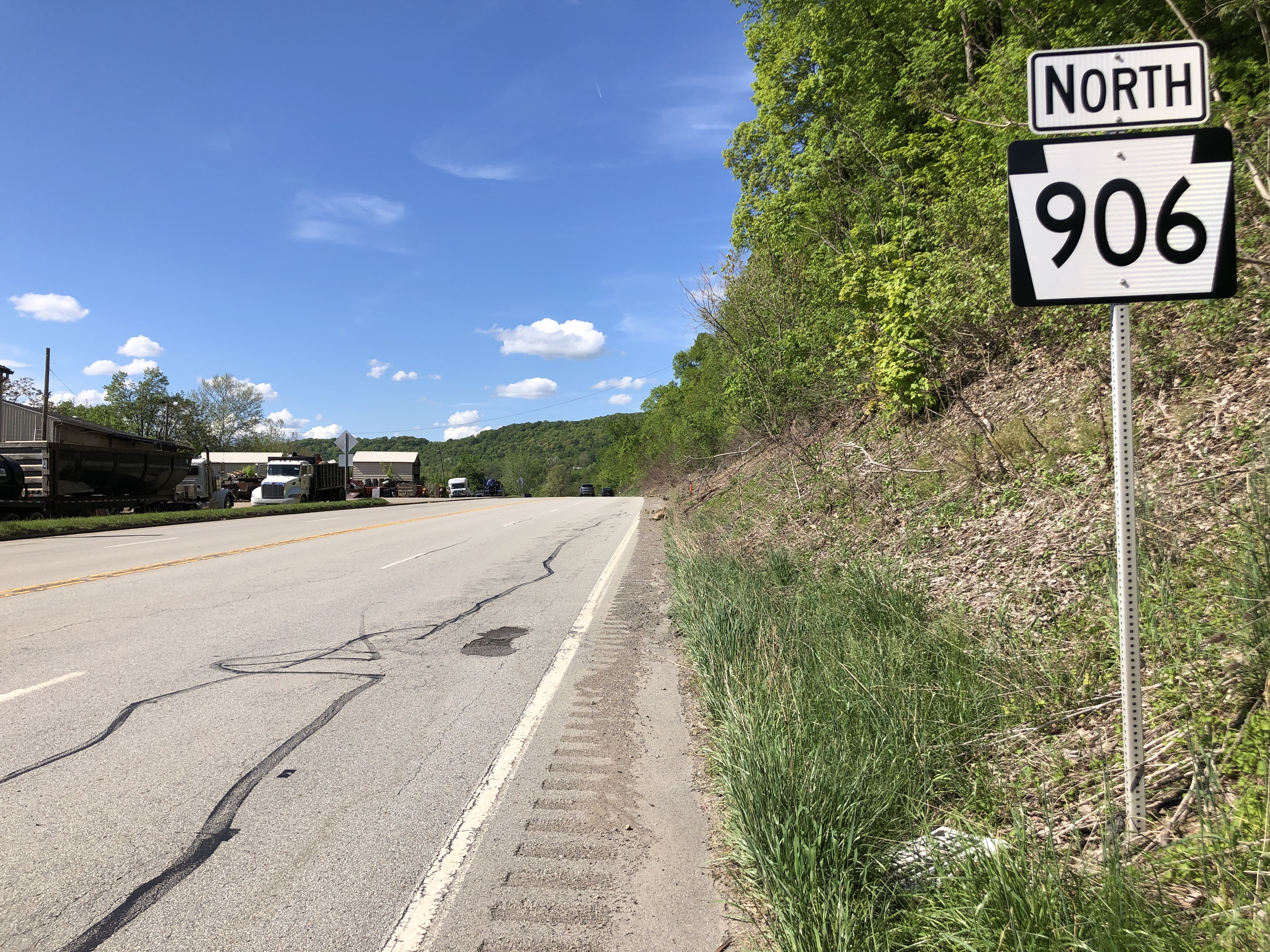
PA 906 northbound in Rostraver Township

PA 906 begins at an intersection with PA 201 in the community of Naomi in Washington Township, Fayette County, heading northwest on two-lane undivided Naomi Road. The road heads between homes to the west and woods to the east, passing through more wooded areas as it runs to the northeast of CSX's Mon Subdivision railroad line and the Monongahela River. The route becomes Fayette City Road and heads into the borough of Belle Vernon, where it heads farther from the railroad line and river as it runs past homes and industrial areas. PA 906 becomes Main Street as it continues through residential areas with a few businesses.

After leaving Belle Vernon, the road comes to an interchange with I-70, passing under the Belle Vernon Bridge that carries the freeway, in Rostraver Township, Westmoreland County. The route then passes underneath a private railroad line before heading under the Speers Railroad Bridge that carries a Wheeling and Lake Erie Railway line. PA 906 heads through woods before running near homes in the community of Gibsonton, passing to the northeast of an industrial site. The road continues northwest through more wooded areas to the northeast of the CSX line and the Monongahela River, passing by the Charleroi Locks & Dam. At this point, the route widens into a four-lane divided highway and turns north, crossing into the city of Monessen and heading past commercial establishments as it intersects the eastern approach to the Charleroi-Monessen Bridge. PA 906 passes more industry to the west and residential areas separated by trees to the east, curving to the east. At this point, the route splits into a one-way pair that follows Schoonmaker Avenue northbound and Donner Avenue southbound, with each road carrying two lanes. The one-way pair heads east through the commercial downtown of Monessen before continuing through urban residential areas. The two directions of PA 906 rejoin and head east on four-lane divided Schoonmaker Avenue, passing between commercial and industrial areas to the north and woods to the south. The road crosses back into Rostraver Township and passes a ramp that provides access to the Donora-Monessen Bridge.

After this, the route narrows into a two-lane undivided road and turns northeast, passing under the bridge. PA 906 becomes an unnamed road and heads through more wooded areas at the bottom of a cliff with the CSX line and the Monongahela River paralleling it to the northwest. The road, along with the railroad tracks and the river, turn to the north, with the route widening to four lanes. PA 906 comes to the community of Webster, where it splits into another one-way pair that follows 2nd Street northbound and 1st Street southbound, with each road carrying two lanes. The route passes homes and businesses within the community, intersecting the eastern approach to the Donora-Webster Bridge. The one-way pair runs through more of the community before both directions of PA 906 rejoin and follow two-lane undivided North Road. The road continues northwest through more forested areas with occasional homes, with the railroad tracks and the river to the southwest. The route eventually turns more to the west. PA 906 crosses into Forward Township in Allegheny County and becomes Rainbow Run Road, ending at an intersection with PA 136 in Milesville. At this point, Rainbow Run Road continues west as a part of that route.

== Major intersections ==
| County | Location | mi | km | Destinations | Notes |
|---|---|---|---|---|---|
| Fayette | Washington Township | 0.000 | 0.000 | PA 201 (Fayette Avenue) – Fairhope, Fayette City | Southern terminus |
| Westmoreland | Rostraver Township | 2.440 | 3.927 | I-70 – New Stanton, Washington | Exit 41 on I-70 |
| Allegheny | Forward Township | 10.577 | 17.022 | PA 136 (Rainbow Run Road) | Northern terminus |
1.000 mi = 1.609 km; 1.000 km = 0.621 mi
