= Pennsylvania Route 643 =

State highway in Fulton County, Pennsylvania, US

Pennsylvania Route 643

Route information
- Maintained by PennDOT
- Length: 7.340 mi (11.813 km)
- Existed: 1963–present

Major junctions
- West end: I-70 in Brush Creek Township
- East end: US 522 in Bethel Township

Location
- Country: United States
- State: Pennsylvania
- Counties: Fulton

Highway system
- Pennsylvania State Route System; Interstate; US; State; Scenic; Legislative
← PA 642	→ PA 645

Pennsylvania Route 643 (PA 643) is a 7.3-mile-long (11.7 km) state highway located in Fulton County, Pennsylvania. The eastern terminus is at U.S. Route 522 (US 522) in Bethel Township. The western terminus is at Interstate 70 (I-70) in Brush Creek Township.

== Route description ==
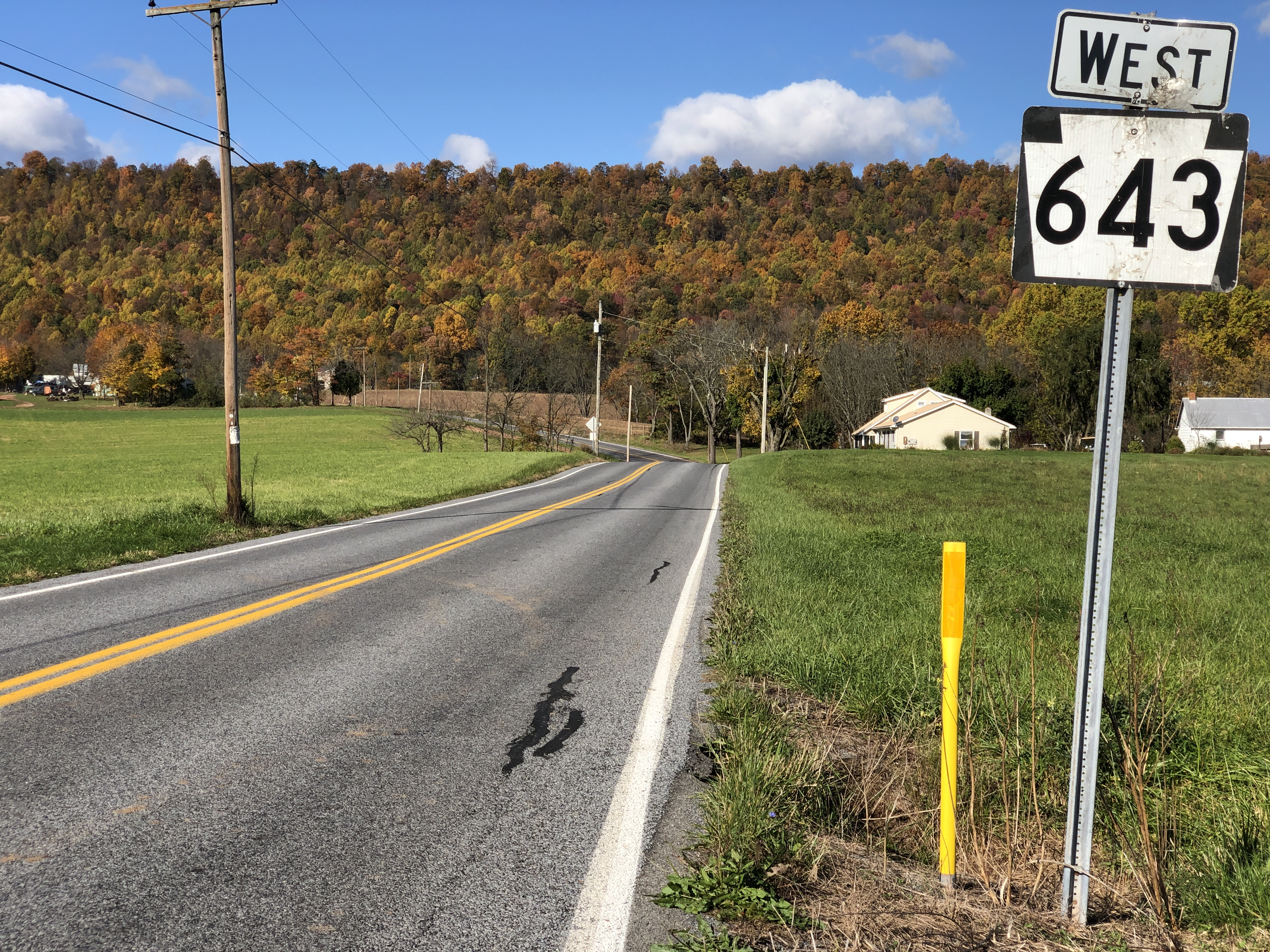
PA 643 westbound in Bethel Township

PA 643 begins at an interchange with I-70 in Brush Creek Township, heading south on two-lane undivided Old 126. The route crosses forested Town Hill before heading into agricultural areas, forking to the southeast onto Flickerville Road. The road passes through the residential community of Town Hill before ascending forested Sideling Hill. PA 643 curves northeast to reach the summit of the hill, at which point it makes a sharp turn to the south into Bethel Township to descend the hill. The road comes to the community of Sideling Hill and turns east into agricultural areas with some woods and homes. The route heads southeast before turning south and coming to its eastern terminus at US 522.

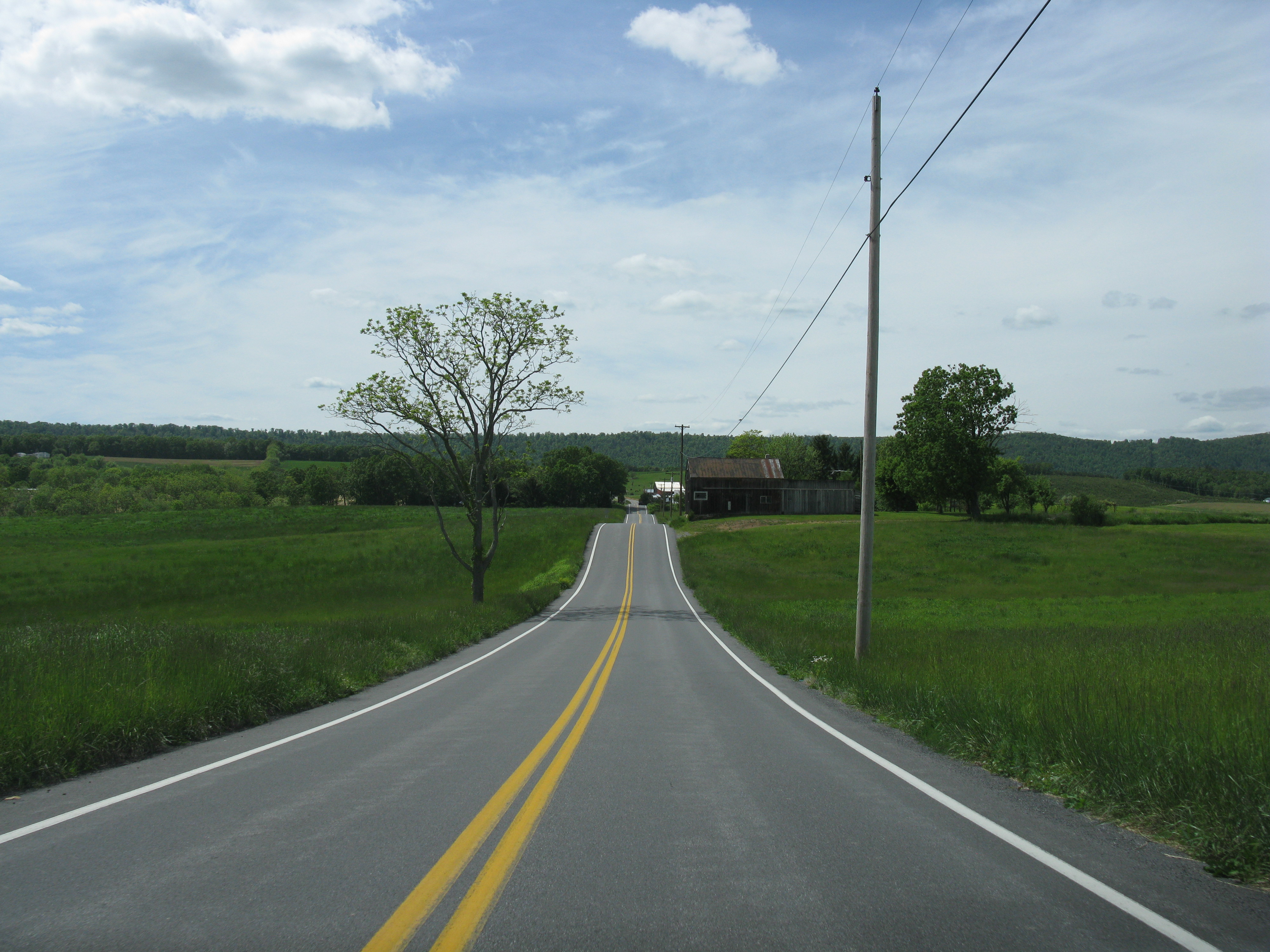
PA 643 approaching US 522 in Bethel Township

== Major intersections ==
The entire route is in Fulton County.

Location	mi	km	Destinations	Notes
Brush Creek Township	0.000	0.000	I-70 – Breezewood, Hancock	Exit 156 (I-70); western terminus
Bethel Township	7.340	11.813	US 522 (Great Cove Road) – McConnellsburg, Warfordsburg	Eastern terminus
1.000 mi = 1.609 km; 1.000 km = 0.621 mi
