= Belle Vernon Area School District =

School district in Pennsylvania

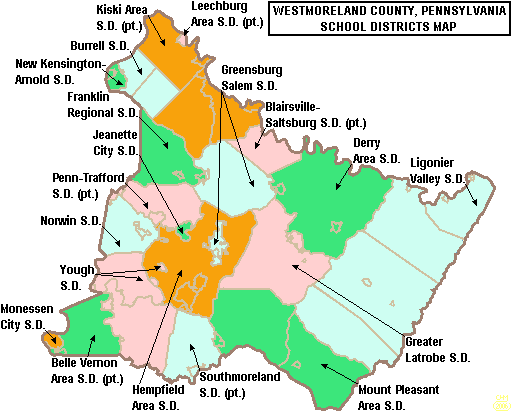

Address
- 270 Crest Avenue Southwestern Pennsylvania Rostraver, Fayette County, Westmoreland County, Pennsylvania, 15012; United States
- Coordinates: 40.1756°N 79.8981°W

District information
- Type: Public
- Established: 1965, first graduating class 1966

Students and staff
- Colors: Green, gold, white

Other information
- Website: bvasd.net

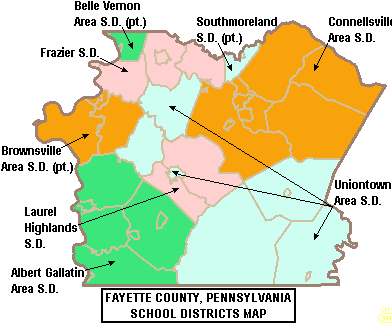
Fayette County School Districts

The Belle Vernon Area School District is a midsized, suburban to rural, public school district located approximately 25 miles (40 km) southeast of Pittsburgh in Westmoreland County and Fayette County. The present school district was formed by a merger of the previous Belmar (having itself been the result of a merge between the Belle Vernon and Marion school districts) and Rostraver school districts in 1965. The district serves five political subdivisions located in 2 counties: Washington Township, Fayette City, North Belle Vernon, Belle Vernon, and Rostraver Township. Belle Vernon Area School District area is 42.2 square miles (109 km^{2}). Belle Vernon Area School District located in southwestern Pennsylvania lies midway between the county seat cities of Pittsburgh to the northwest, Uniontown to the southeast, Washington to the west, and Greensburg to the northeast. Belle Vernon Area School District had a population as of 2000 of 20,127 residents. By 2010, the district's population declined to 18,912 people. The educational attainment levels for the School District population (25 years old and over) were 91% high school graduates and 21.6% college graduates. The district is one of the 500 public school districts of Pennsylvania.

According to the Pennsylvania Budget and Policy Center, 35.3% of the district's pupils lived at 185% or below the Federal Poverty Level as shown by their eligibility for the federal free or reduced price school meal programs in 2012. In 2013, the Pennsylvania Department of Education, reported that 23 students in the Belle Vernon Area School District were homeless. In 2009, the district residents’ per capita income was $18,808, while the median family income was $43,201. In the Commonwealth, the median family income was $49,501 and the United States median family income was $49,445, in 2010. In Westmoreland County, the median household income was $50,736. By 2013, the median household income in the United States rose to $52,100. In 2014, the median household income in the USA was $53,700.

Belle Vernon Area School District operates four schools: Rostraver Elementary School, Marion Elementary School, Belle Vernon Area Middle School and Belle Vernon Area High School. The district also offers an online education alternative called BVA eAcademy for pupils in 7th to 12th grades. High school students may choose to attend the Central Westmoreland Career and Technology Center which is located in New Stanton, Pa, for training in the construction and mechanical trades. The Westmoreland Intermediate Unit IU7, located in Greensburg, Pennsylvania provides the district with a wide variety of services like: specialized education for disabled students and hearing; state mandated recognizing and reporting child abuse training; speech and visual disability services; criminal background check processing for prospective employees, as well as professional development for employees.

== Extracurriculars ==
The district offers a variety of clubs, activities and sports.

=== Clubs ===
Clubs offered include: Art Club, Bible Club, Book Group, BotsIQ, Broadcast Staff, Caring Team, Cheerleaders, Chorus, Drama Club, F.A.S.T. Council, FBLA, French Club, High School Gifted Activities, Home Economics Club, Interact Club, LEO Club, Politics Club, Majorettes, Marching Band, MIC/SADD (Medical Interest Club / Students Against Destructive Decisions), National Forensic League, National Honor Society, Newspaper, Prom Committee, Senior Class of 2011, Ski Club, Spanish Club, Student Advisory, Council, The Future Is Mine, Yearbook.
