= Belle Vernon Bridge =

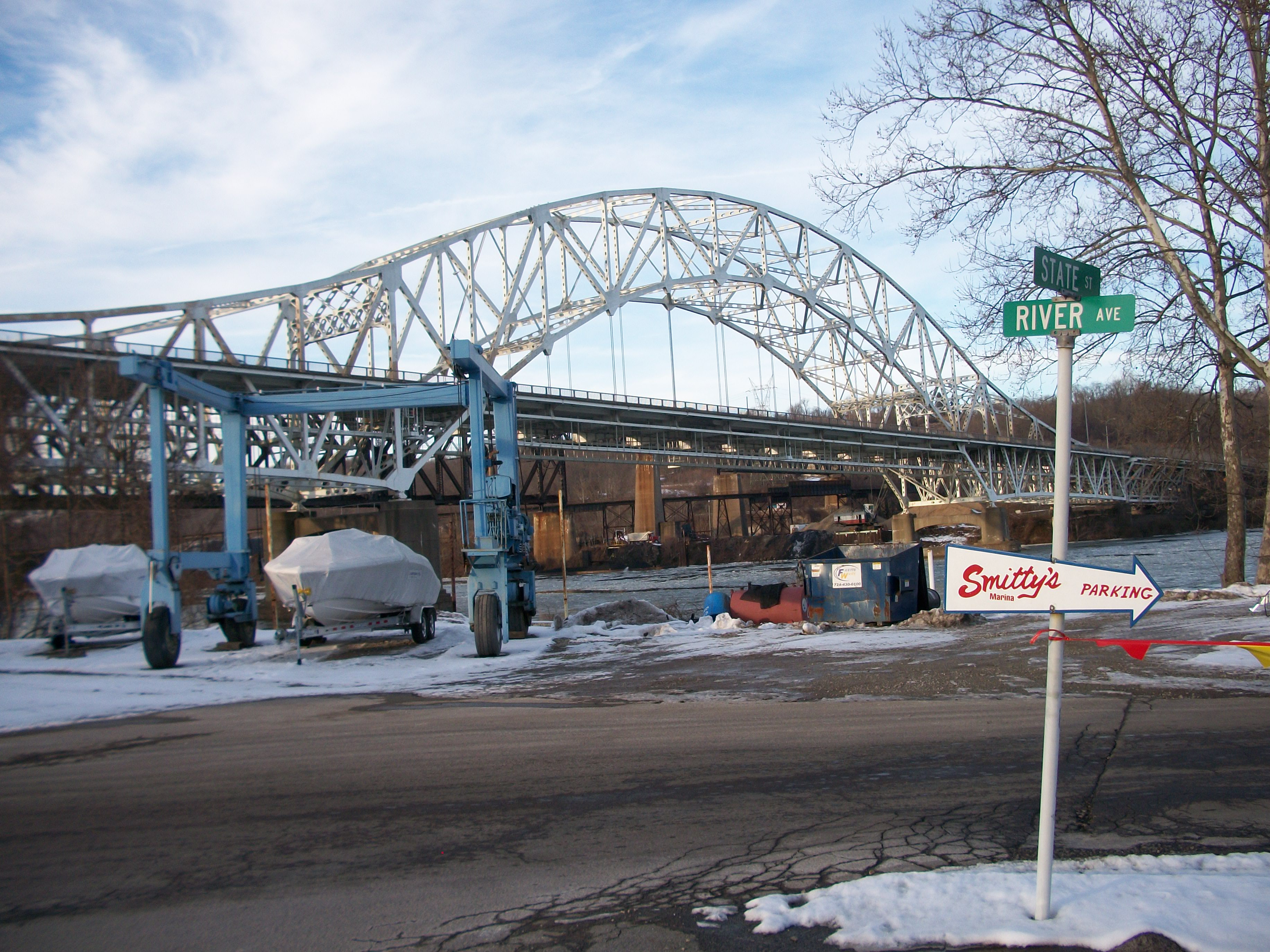
- Coordinates: 40.127°N 79.878°W
- Carries: 4 lanes of I-70
- Crosses: Monongahela River
- Locale: North Belle Vernon, Pennsylvania and Speers, Pennsylvania
- Other name: Speers Bridge

Characteristics
- Design: Steel arch bridge
- Total length: 2,066 feet (630 m)
- Longest span: 450.2 feet (137.2 m)

History
- Opened: 1951

Statistics
- Daily traffic: approx. 35,000

Location
- Interactive map of Belle Vernon Bridge

The Belle Vernon Bridge, also called the Speers Bridge or Speers/Belle Vernon Bridge, carries Interstate 70 across the Monongahela River from Speers east to Rostraver Township in the state of Pennsylvania. Around 1951, it replaced an earlier low-level bridge, which connected Pennsylvania Route 88 via State Street with Pennsylvania Route 906 at the I-70 east ramps, just to the south of the current bridge. The old bridge carried Legislative Route 118 and Pennsylvania Route 71 until those were moved to the new bridge when it opened.

== History ==
The new bridge was authorized by President Truman on 22 June 1946.

== Incidents ==
Trolley services were disrupted when a girder for the new bridge fell, severing the wires in 1951. Several people were injured by flying debris when one of the supports for the previous bridge was demolished by blasting in 1955.

== See also ==
- List of crossings of the Monongahela River
