= Pennsylvania Route 711 =

State highway in Pennsylvania, US

Pennsylvania Route 711

Route information
- Maintained by PennDOT
- Length: 55 mi (89 km)
- Existed: 1928–present
- Tourist routes: Laurel Highlands Scenic Byway

Major junctions
- South end: US 119 / PA 201 / PA 711 Truck in Connellsville
- PA 31 in Donegal; US 30 in Ligonier
- North end: PA 403 in East Wheatfield Township

Location
- Country: United States
- State: Pennsylvania
- Counties: Fayette, Westmoreland, Indiana

Highway system
- Pennsylvania State Route System; Interstate; US; State; Scenic; Legislative
← US 711	→ PA 712

Pennsylvania State Route 711 (PA 711) is a 55-mile-long (89 km), north–south state highway in the U.S. state of Pennsylvania that is located in Fayette, Westmoreland, and Indiana counties in state highway that is located in Fayette, Westmoreland, and Indiana counties.

== Route description ==
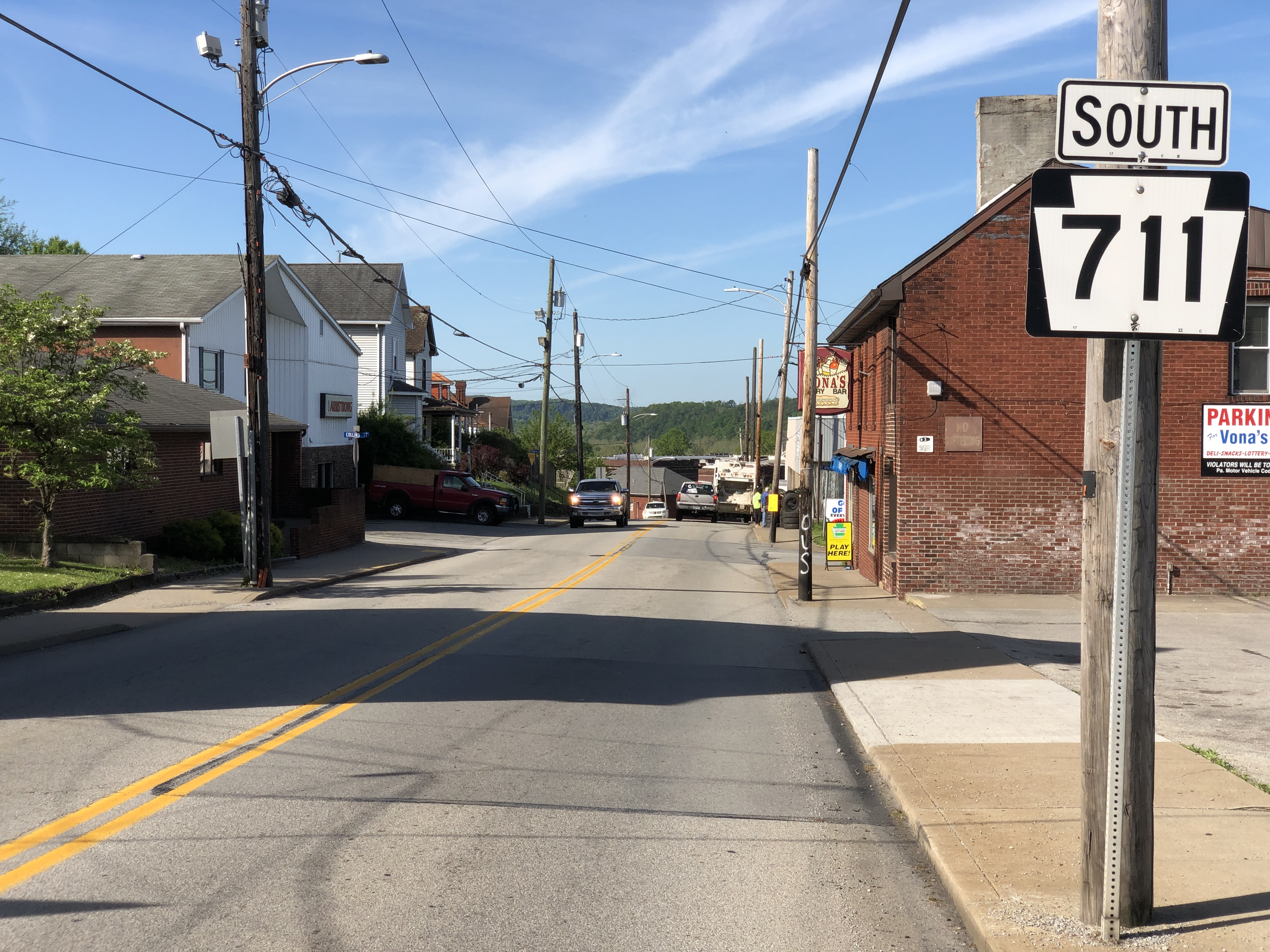
PA 711 southbound in Connellsville

PA 711 goes by many names along its route. The names include Crawford Avenue, Snyder Street, Springfield Pike, Main Street, Ligonier Street, Stahlstown-Ligonier Road, Market Street, Market Street Extension, 13th Street, Second Street, Charles Road, and Indian Creek Valley Road.

Even though its signed north–south along its route, the route in Fayette County takes a more east–west direction, and most of the rest of the route in Westmoreland and Indiana counties goes more of a southwest–northeast direction.

=== Fayette County ===
The route begins at an intersection of US 119 and PA 201 in the western part of the city of Connellsville. The route goes east from the city to PA 381 in the village of Normalville, and begins a concurrency that spans for a 8 miles (13 km) before the route enters Westmoreland County.

=== Westmoreland County ===
The route continues its concurrency with PA 381 for another 2 miles (3.2 km) until it splits at Jones Mills. As soon as the concurrency ends, the route has another short concurrency with PA 31 from Jones Mills to the borough of Donegal.

Continuing on PA 31 provides access to the Pennsylvania Turnpike, where the Donegal Interchange (Exit 91) lies very close to PA 711 (signage on the Turnpike shows this as a route to PA 711). After PA 711 itself passes over the Pennsylvania Turnpike, the route passes through Donegal, and heads northeast to the village of Stahlstown, where it has an intersection with PA 130.

The route continues northeast to the borough of Ligonier, where it intersects with US 30. After passing through town, the route continues northeast to PA 271 in the village of Oak Grove.

The route heads north to the village of West Fairfield, where the route starts to parallel the Conemaugh River and passes through the boroughs of New Florence and Seward. In the borough of Seward, the route has a concurrency with PA 56, where it continues to Indiana County.

=== Indiana County ===
The route continues with PA 56 for a short distance to the village of Robindale Heights, where PA 56 splits from the route, and PA 711 heads east. It continues east to the village of Cramer, where the route terminates at PA 403.

== History ==
PA 711 has a long history of changes and news along its route. The route was first signed in 1928, but construction along the route did not get completed until the early 1930s. In the 1950s, the route's southern terminus was moved from Pleasant Grove to PA 71 at the intersection at I-70 in the borough of Belle Vernon. In the 1960s, the southern terminus was moved yet again to its current location.

== Major intersections ==
County	Location	mi	km	Destinations	Notes
Fayette	Connellsville	0.0	0.0	US 119 / PA 711 Truck north (8th Street/9th Street) PA 201 north (Vanderbilt Road)	Southern termini of PA 711 and PA 201
Fayette	Connellsville			PA 711 Truck south (East Crawford Avenue)	
Fayette	Springfield Township	9.0	14.5	PA 381 south (Whites Bridge Road) – Mill Run, Ohiopyle	Southern terminus of PA 381 concurrency
Westmoreland	Donegal Township	18.6	29.9	PA 31 east / PA 381 north	Northern terminus of PA 381 concurrency, southern terminus of PA 31 concurrency
Westmoreland	Donegal	20.5	33.0	PA 31 west to I-70 / I-76 / Penna Turnpike – Mount Pleasant	Northern terminus of PA 31 concurrency
Westmoreland	Donegal Township	24.9	40.1	PA 130 (Main Street) – Lycippus, Kregar	
Westmoreland	Ligonier	33.2	53.4	US 30 (Lincoln Highway) – Greensburg, Laughlintown, Jennerstown	
Westmoreland	Ligonier Township	36.0	57.9	PA 271 north (Menoher Highway) – Johnstown	Southern terminus of PA 271
Westmoreland	Seward	51.8	83.4	PA 56 east – Johnstown	Southern terminus of PA 56 concurrency
Indiana	East Wheatfield Township	52.5	84.5	PA 56 west – Armagh	Northern terminus of PA 56 concurrency
Indiana	East Wheatfield Township	54.5	87.7	PA 403 (Cramer Pike) – Dilltown, Johnstown	Northern terminus of PA 711
1.000 mi = 1.609 km; 1.000 km = 0.621 mi: Concurrency terminus

== PA 711 Truck ==
Pennsylvania Route 711 Truck
- Location: Connellsville
- Length: 3 mi (4.8 km)
- Existed: 1975–present

Pennsylvania Route 711 Truck (PA 711 Truck) is a 3-mile-long (4.8 km) truck route located in Fayette County. The route begins at US 119, PA 201, and PA 711 west of Connellsville and follows US 119 around the northwestern edge of the city on Memorial Boulevard to Crawford Avenue Extension. Here, PA 711 Truck turns southward and follows the extension and Crawford Avenue back to PA 711 in the eastern portion of Connellsville.
