= Interstate 70S =

Interstate 70S may refer to:

- Interstate 70S (Maryland), a former Interstate highway in Maryland, now numbered as Interstate 270
- Interstate 70S (Pennsylvania), a former Interstate highway in Pennsylvania
