= Warfordsburg, Pennsylvania =

Unincorporated community in Pennsylvania, U.S.

Coordinates: 39°45′06″N 78°11′15″W

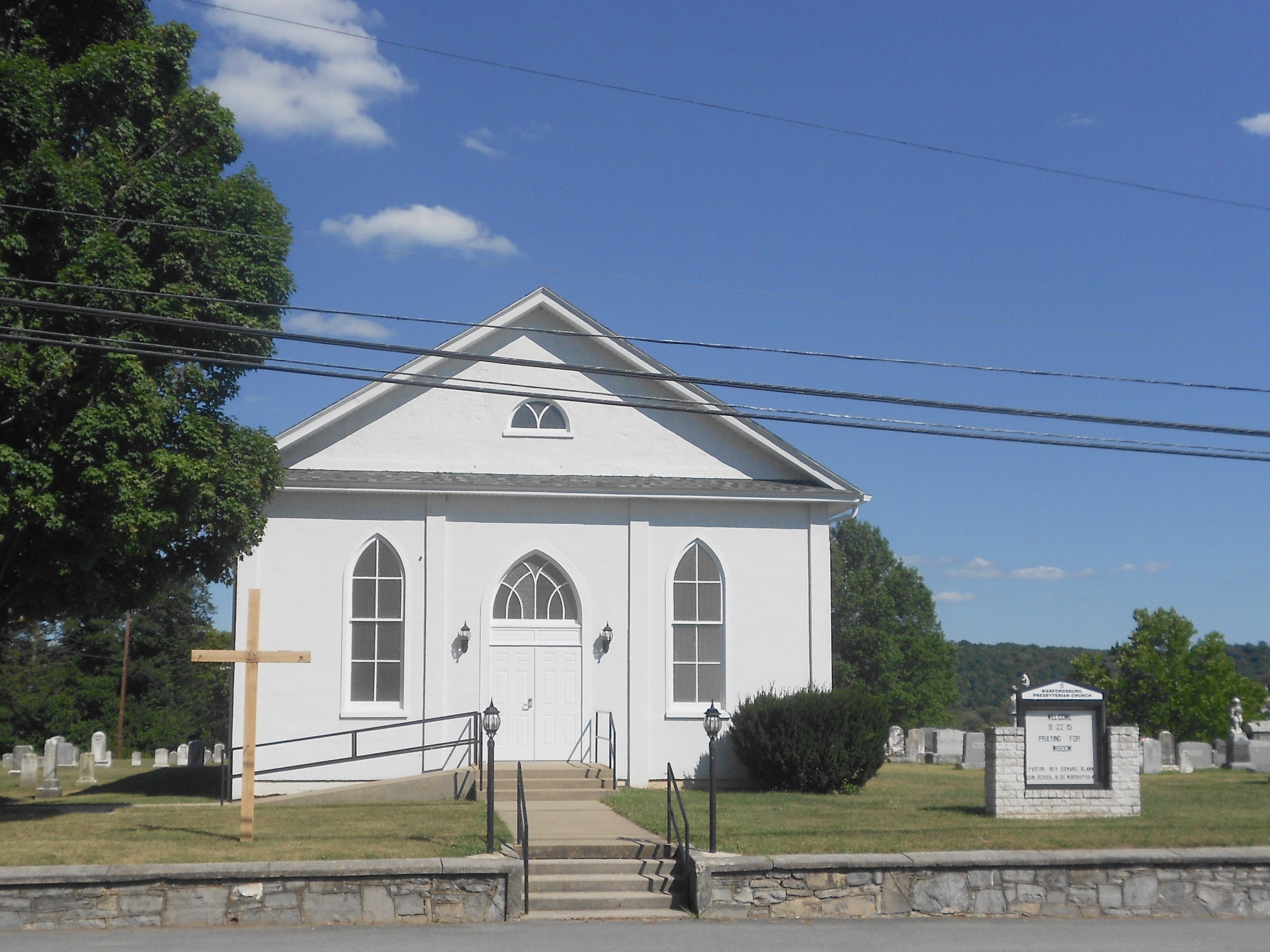
Warfordsburg Presbyterian Church

Warfordsburg is an unincorporated community and census-designated place in Bethel Township, Fulton County, Pennsylvania, United States. It lies just north of the Mason–Dixon line, near Interstate 70, and readily accessible to U.S. Route 40, the historic National Road, just across the Maryland state line. The zip code is 17267.

== History ==
In December 1776, Joseph Warford was deeded 100 acres (0.40 km^{2}) of land on which he laid out a village that was to become known as Warfordsburg. A large stone structure that served as the Warford home and tavern was built, though the building was destroyed by fire in 1947.

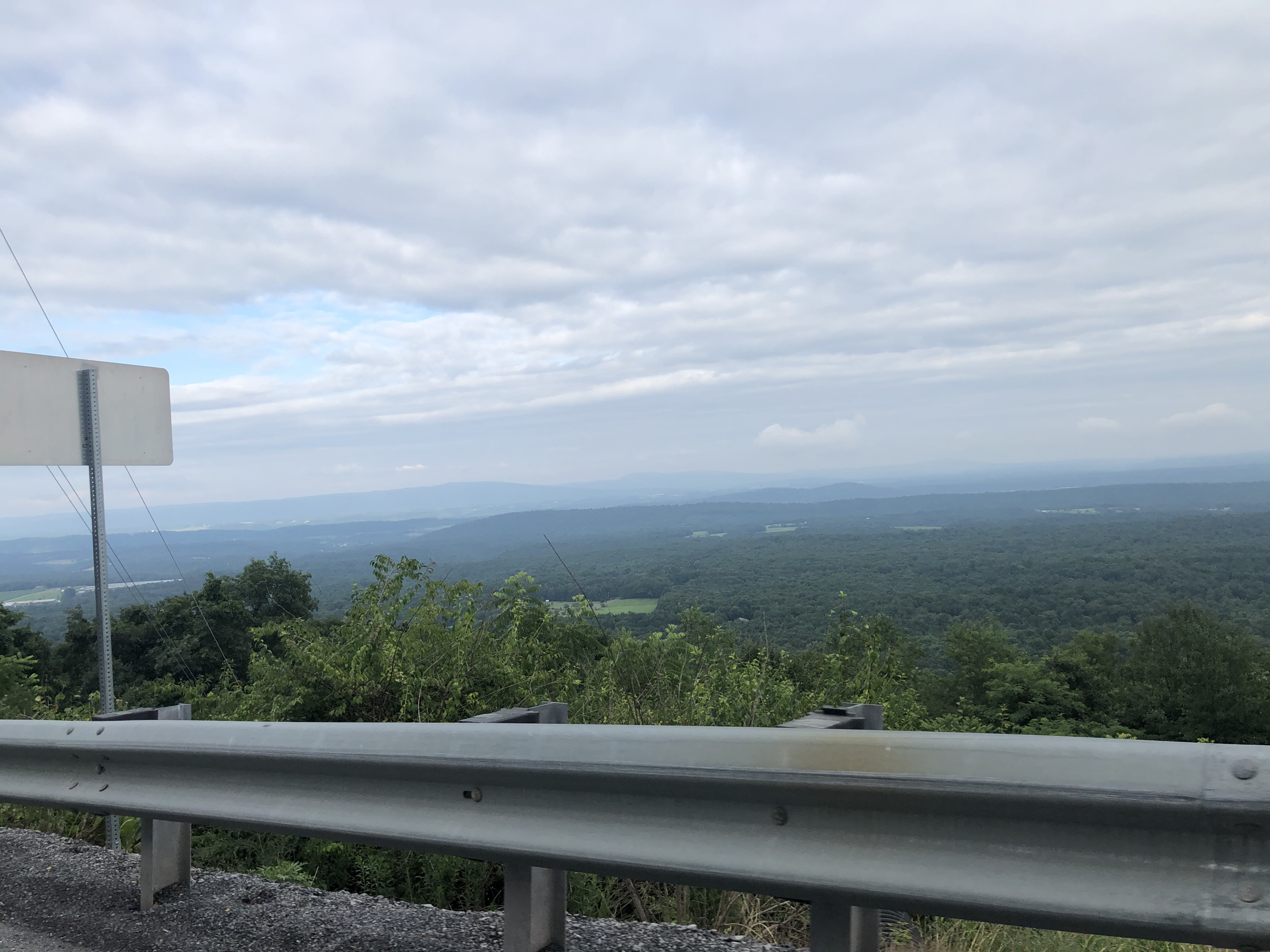
Overlooking Warfordsburg valley (Buck Valley) East from I-70

== Demographics ==
Historical population
Census	Pop.	Note	%±

The United States Census Bureau defined Warfordsburg as a census designated place (CDP) in 2023.

The population is 2,708, There are 28 people per square mile, and the median age is 44.2. The average household size is 2.43 people. 29.32% of people are married with children, and 9.42% have children, but are single. 96.31% of people are White, 0.55% of people are Black, 0.15% of people are Asian, 0.07% of people are Native American, and 0.00% of people are Other. The female population is 50.81% of the population, while the male population is 49.19% of the population.
