= Jesse M. Bowell =

American captain and politician (1846–1889)

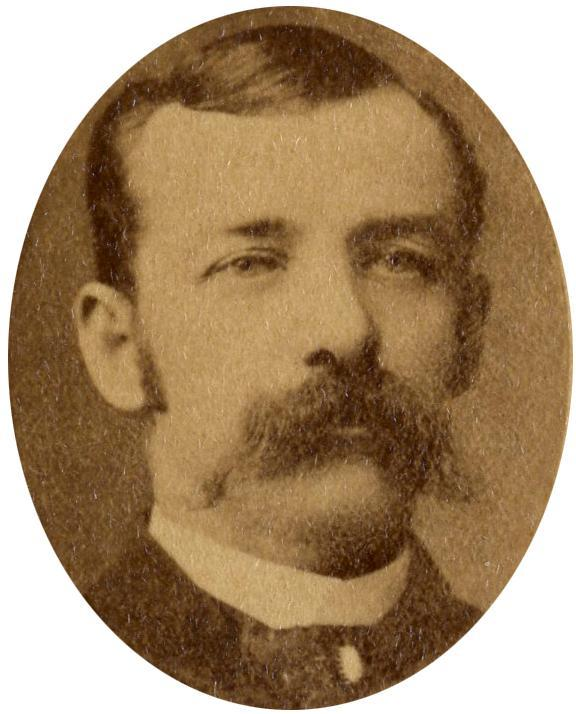
Pennsylvania House of Representatives portrait of Bowell.

Jesse M. Bowell (January 19, 1846 – October 31, 1889) was an American captain and politician. From 1885 to 1886, Bowell served as a member of the Pennsylvania House of Representatives for the Democratic Party. Born in Millsboro, Pennsylvania, he was an engineer and pilot on the Monongahela River early in his youth. After selling his first boat, the Athletic, in mid-1881, he built a steamship, named after himself: J. M. Bowell. In 1884, he was elected to the Pennsylvania House of Representatives. He ran for the legislature again in 1886, although lost.

On October 29, 1889, Bowell was involved in an altercation with Captain Decatur Abrams, resulting in Abrams mortally wounding Bowell by throwing a boulder at the latter. Bowell died from his injuries two days later. Abrams was initially charged with murder, although he was released on a $1,000 bail nearly a month after the incident.

== Life and career ==
Bowell was born on January 19, 1846, in Millsboro, Pennsylvania. While in his youth, he partaked in the foundry business. Later, he was an engineer and pilot on the Monongahela River. In 1876, Bowell was arrested on a charge of running a business without a license. Bowell was elected as generalissimo of St. Omar's Commandery in Brownsville in 1883.

Bowell owned a boat, named the Athletic. He later sold her for $4,500 to W. H. Moore in August 1881. Shortly after selling the Athletic, Bowell began building a steamship, named J. M. Bowell, in Brownsville. In 1882, the steamship made her first trip. Two years later, the boat was capsized by a storm on July 24, 1884, near Coal Center; one passenger drowned out of thirty total.

At the time of Bowell's death, he lived in Belle Vernon, and previously served as a member of its council and school board. In 1884, Bowell ran for the Pennsylvania House of Representatives from Fayette County as a member of the Democratic Party. He won the primary alongside Thomas B. Schnatterly, with each candidate receiving around 1,700 votes. In the general election, they were both elected to the chamber. Two years later in 1886, Bowell ran again for the General Assembly, (Note: Contemporary news articles state that Bowell opted to run for the Pennsylvania State Senate in 1886. Articles written after Bowell's lifetime state that he ran for re-nomination to the House.) although he was defeated in the Democratic primary. In January 1887, Bowell purchased the brewery of Boyd and Maxwell, located in Allenport. Bowell became eminent commander of Brownsville Commandery No. 7 in 1888.

=== Death ===
On October 29, 1889, Bowell was involved in an alteraction with Captain Decatur Abrams over a freight bill. Bowell described Abrams as a liar, to which Abrams threw a boulder at Bowell, mortally wounding the latter and fracturing his skull. After the altercation, Abrams boarded his steamer and traveled to Brownsville, where he was caught and taken to a jail in Uniontown awaiting trial. Bowell died two days later at his home in Belle Vernon on October 31 at 3:15 a.m., never once regaining his consciousness. After Bowell's death, Abram was officially charged with murder. Bowell's funeral was held on November 3 in Brownsville, and his remains were transferred to Millsboro, where they were interred.

Accounts of the stories were varied. Abrams claimed self-defense; according to Abrams, he had walked past Bowell in Belle Vernon after the two had not spoken for over a year. Abrams attempted to ignore Bowell, however Bowell—reportedly under the influence—began cursing and abusing Abrams. As Abrams continued to ignore him, Bowell attempted to punch Abrams. In response, Abrams, feeling that he was physically inferior compared to Bowell, hurled a boulder at Bowell. Abrams attempted to help him up after throwing it, but by then, Bowell had been knocked unconscious. Two eyewitnesses of the event further corroborated Abrams's statements. According to a separate account, Abrams threw the boulder while Bowell was turned back, falling face-first on the gloor. Abrams then turned Bowell over and concluded that he was dead, leaving him. Around a week after his arrest, Abrams requested a release based on habeas corpus. Nearly a month after the incident, Abrams was released on a $1,000 bail.

After Bowell's death, his steamer J. M. Bowell was placed on auction, but no buyers were interested.
