= Lover, Pennsylvania =

Unincorporated community in Pennsylvania, US

- Unincorporated community
- Location within the state of Pennsylvania Lover, Pennsylvania (the United States)
- Coordinates: 40°06′45″N 79°57′01″W
- Country: United States
- State: Pennsylvania
- County: Washington
- Elevation: 1,070 ft (330 m)
- Time zone: UTC-5 (Eastern (EST))
  - Summer (DST): UTC-4 (EDT)
- GNIS feature ID: 1205064

Lover is an unincorporated community in Washington County, Pennsylvania, United States.

Lover is located along Pennsylvania Route 481.

The Lover Church is located north of the settlement.
