= Bethel Township, Fulton County, Pennsylvania =

Township in Pennsylvania, United States

Coordinates: 39°45′30″N 78°15′29″W

Bethel Township
- Township
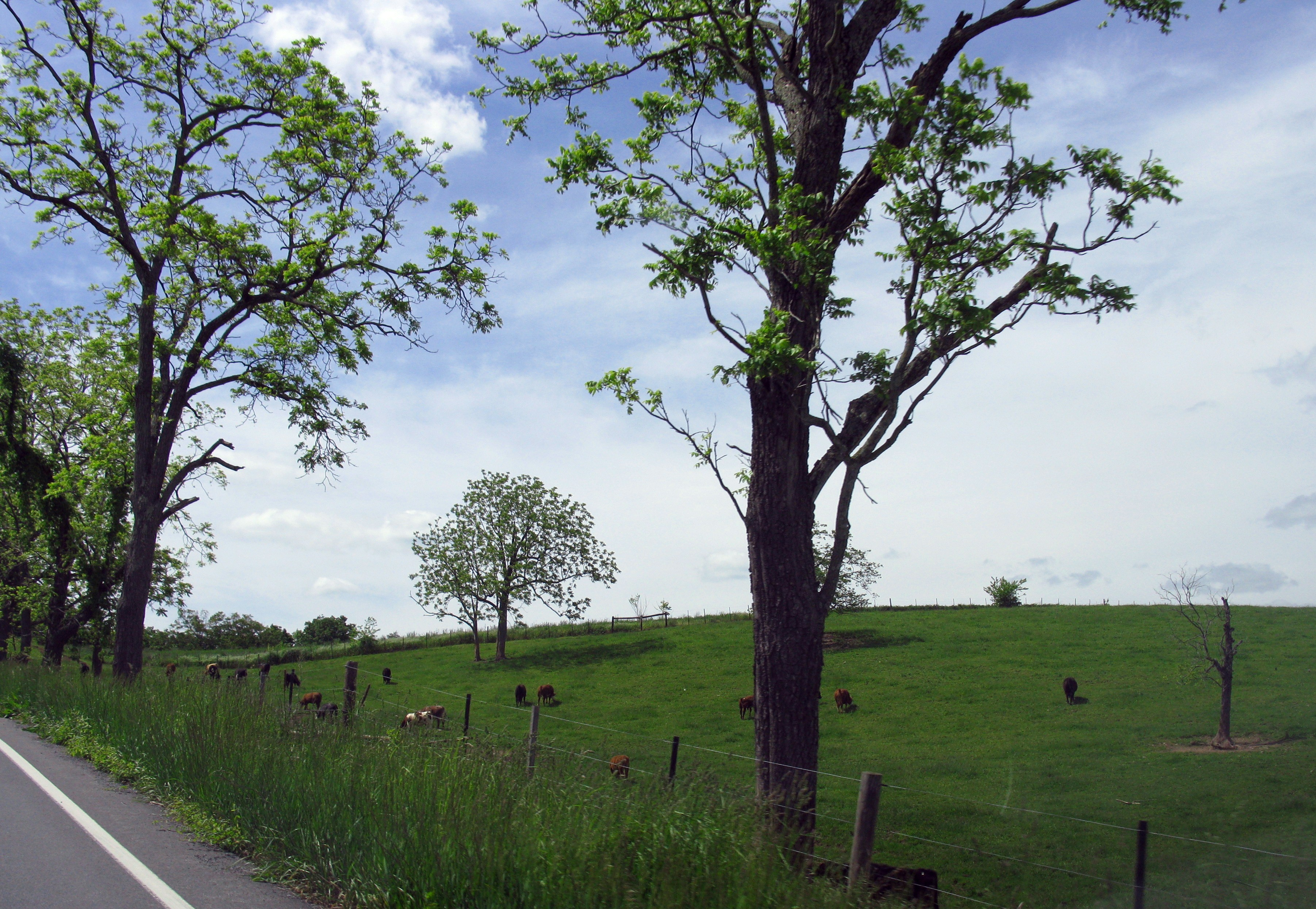
- A pasture in Bethel Township

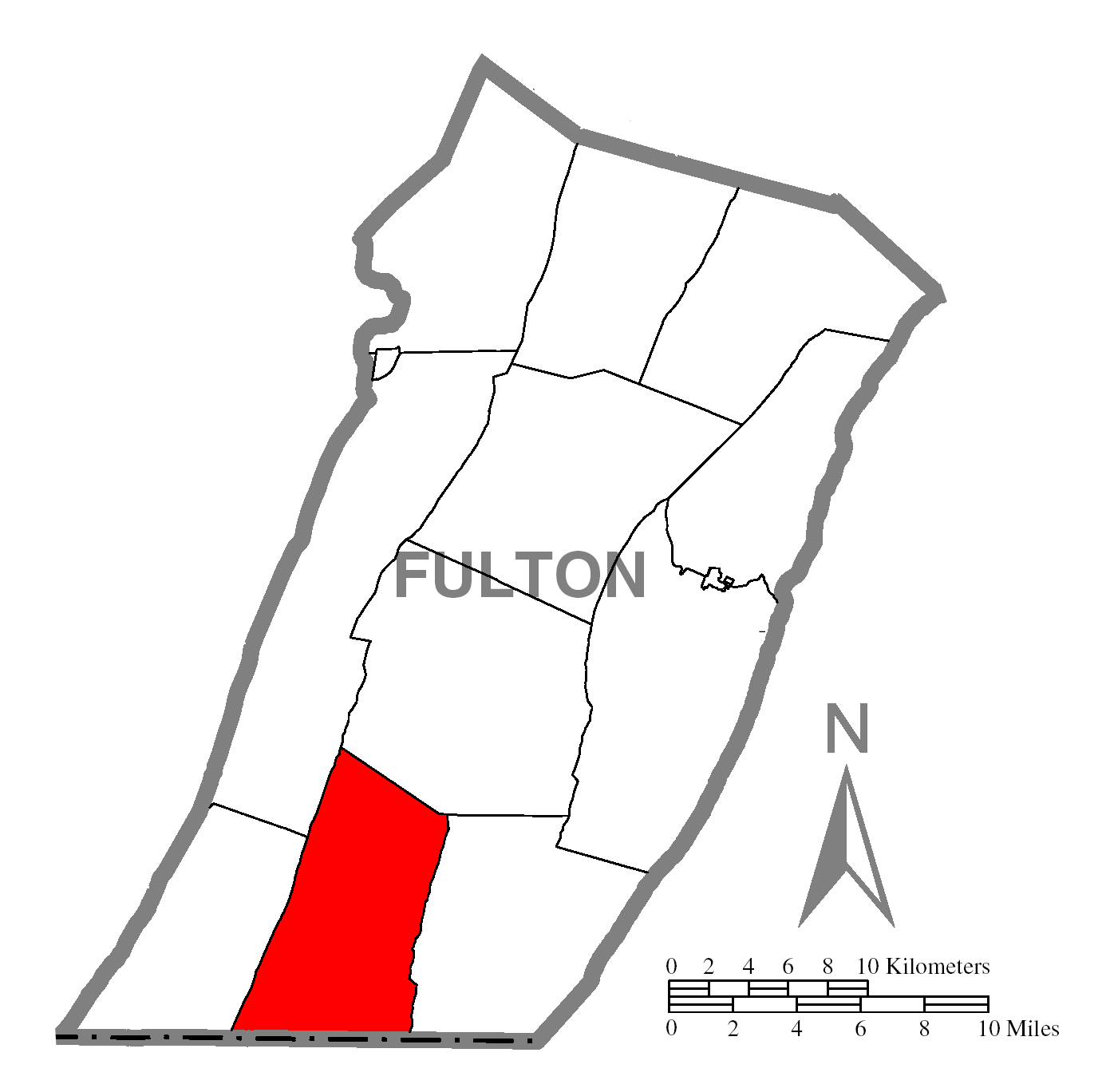
- Location of Bethel Township in Fulton County

- Location of Fulton County in Pennsylvania
- Country: United States
- State: Pennsylvania
- County: Fulton County
- Established: 1770

Area
  - Total: 37.07 sq mi (96.01 km^{2})
  - Land: 37.06 sq mi (95.99 km^{2})
  - Water: 0.0077 sq mi (0.02 km^{2})

Population (2020)
  - Total: 1,551 ▼
  - Estimate (2023): 1,555
  - Density: 40.6/sq mi (15.69/km^{2})
- Time zone: UTC-4 (EST)
  - Summer (DST): UTC-5 (EDT)
- FIPS code: 42-057-06032

Bethel Township is a township in Fulton County, Pennsylvania, United States. The population was 1,551 at the 2020 census.

== Geography ==
According to the United States Census Bureau, the township has a total area of 37.1 square miles (96 km^{2}), of which 37.1 square miles (96 km^{2}) is land and 0.03% is water.

Dott is an unincorporated community located within Bethel Township.

== Demographics ==
Historical population
Census	Pop.	Note	%±
2000	1,420		—
2010	1,508		6.2%
2020	1,551		2.9%
2023 (est.)	1,555		0.3%
U.S. Decennial Census

As of the census of 2000, there were 1,420 people, 559 households, and 423 families residing in the township. The population density was 38.3 inhabitants per square mile (14.8/km^{2}). There were 644 housing units at an average density of 17.4/sq mi (6.7/km^{2}). The racial makeup of the township was 98.24% White, 0.28% African American, 0.28% Native American, 0.14% Asian, 0.21% from other races, and 0.85% from two or more races. Hispanic or Latino of any race were 0.56% of the population.

There were 559 households, out of which 31.5% had children under the age of 18 living with them, 64.2% were married couples living together, 8.1% had a female householder with no husband present, and 24.3% were non-families. 20.6% of all households were made up of individuals, and 8.8% had someone living alone who was 65 years of age or older. The average household size was 2.54 and the average family size was 2.93.

In the township the population was spread out, with 24.1% under the age of 18, 9.0% from 18 to 24, 27.3% from 25 to 44, 26.8% from 45 to 64, and 12.9% who were 65 years of age or older. The median age was 37 years. For every 100 females, there were 100.8 males. For every 100 females age 18 and over, there were 103.4 males.

The median income for a household in the township was $36,518, and the median income for a family was $40,333. Males had a median income of $27,167 versus $20,083 for females. The per capita income for the township was $15,999. About 6.0% of families and 8.7% of the population were below the poverty line, including 13.7% of those under age 18 and 12.1% of those age 65 or over.

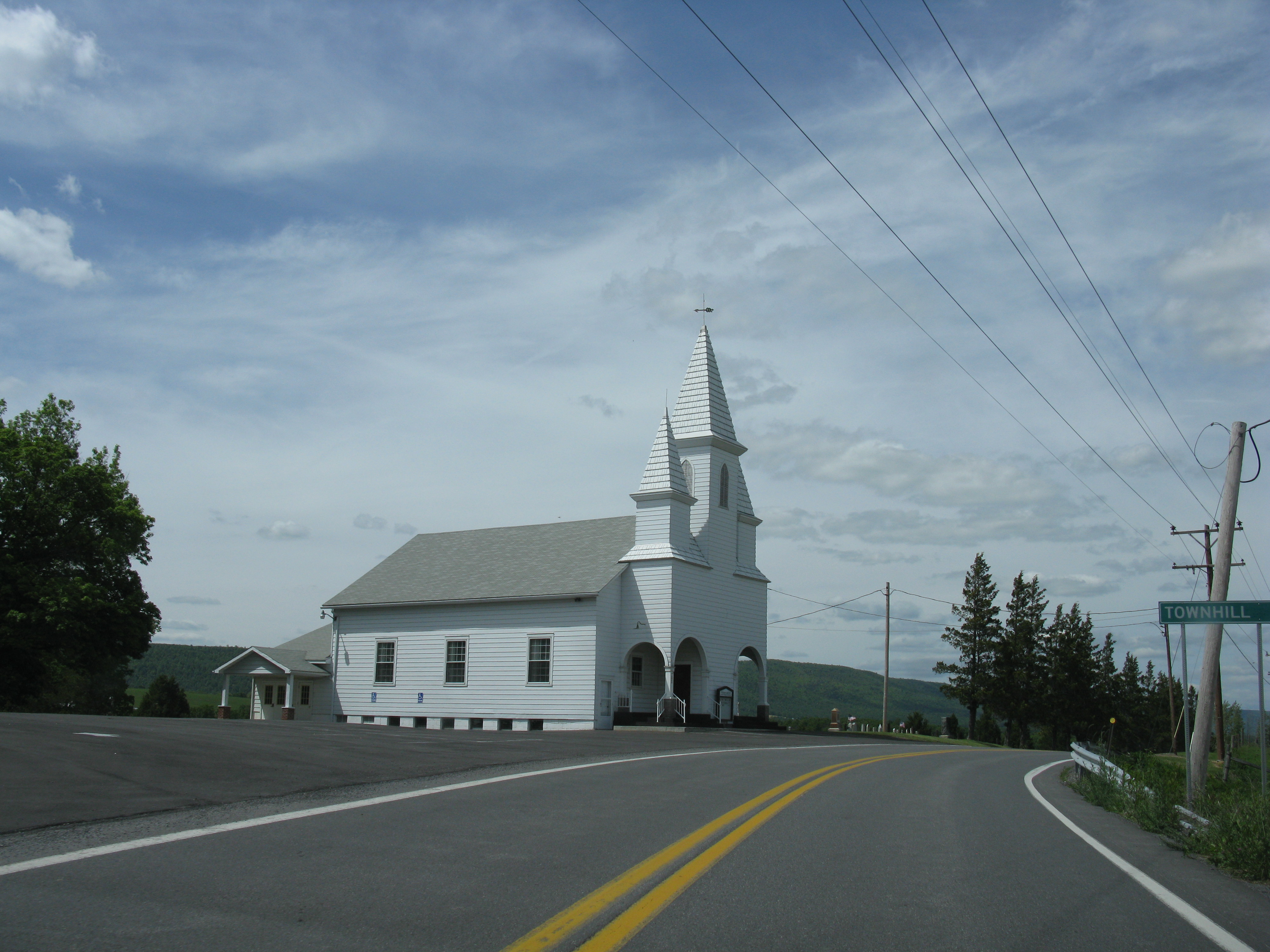
Cedar Grove Christian Church

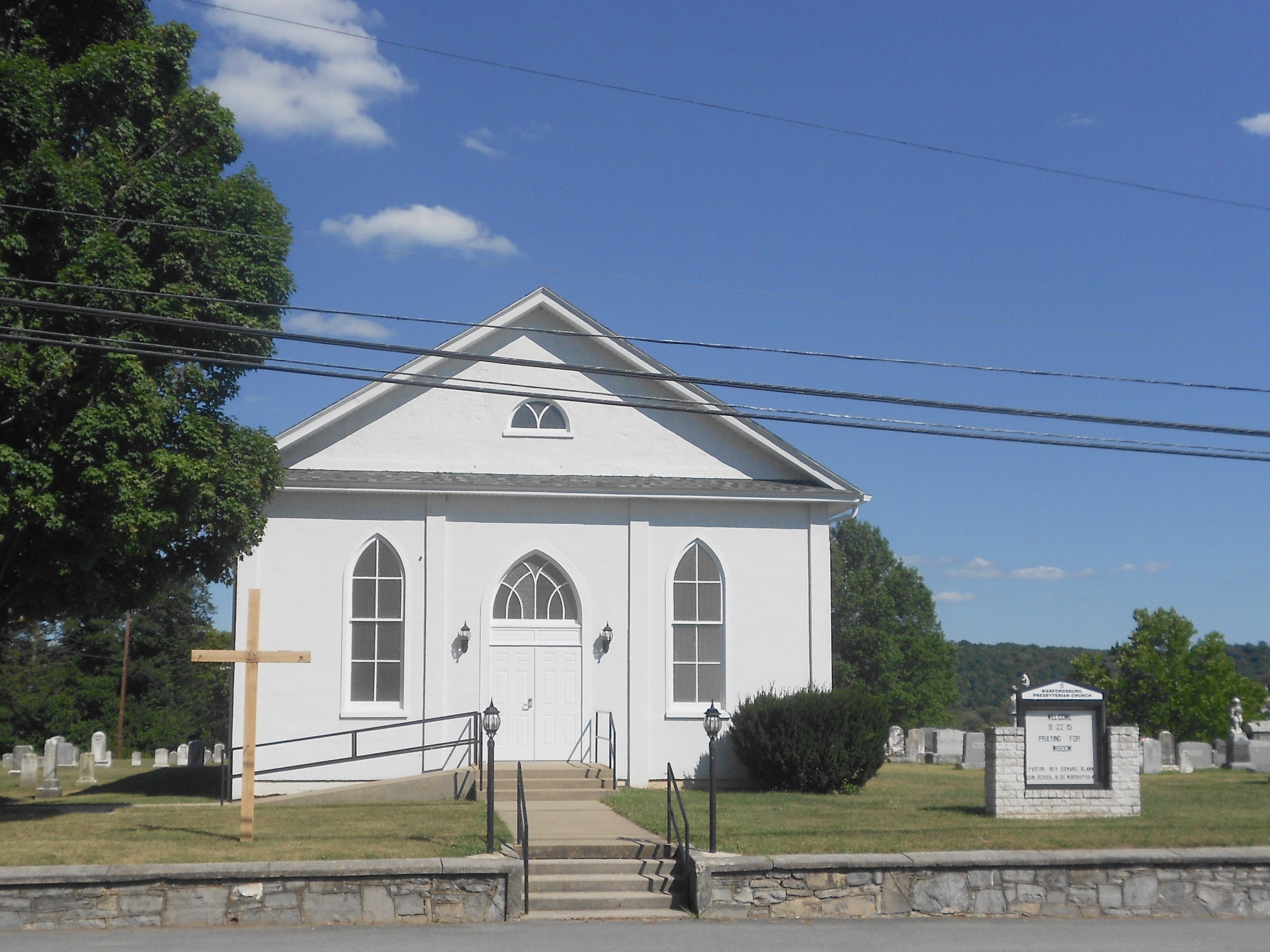
Warfordsburg Presbyterian Church
