= New Stanton, Pennsylvania =

Borough in Pennsylvania, US

- Borough
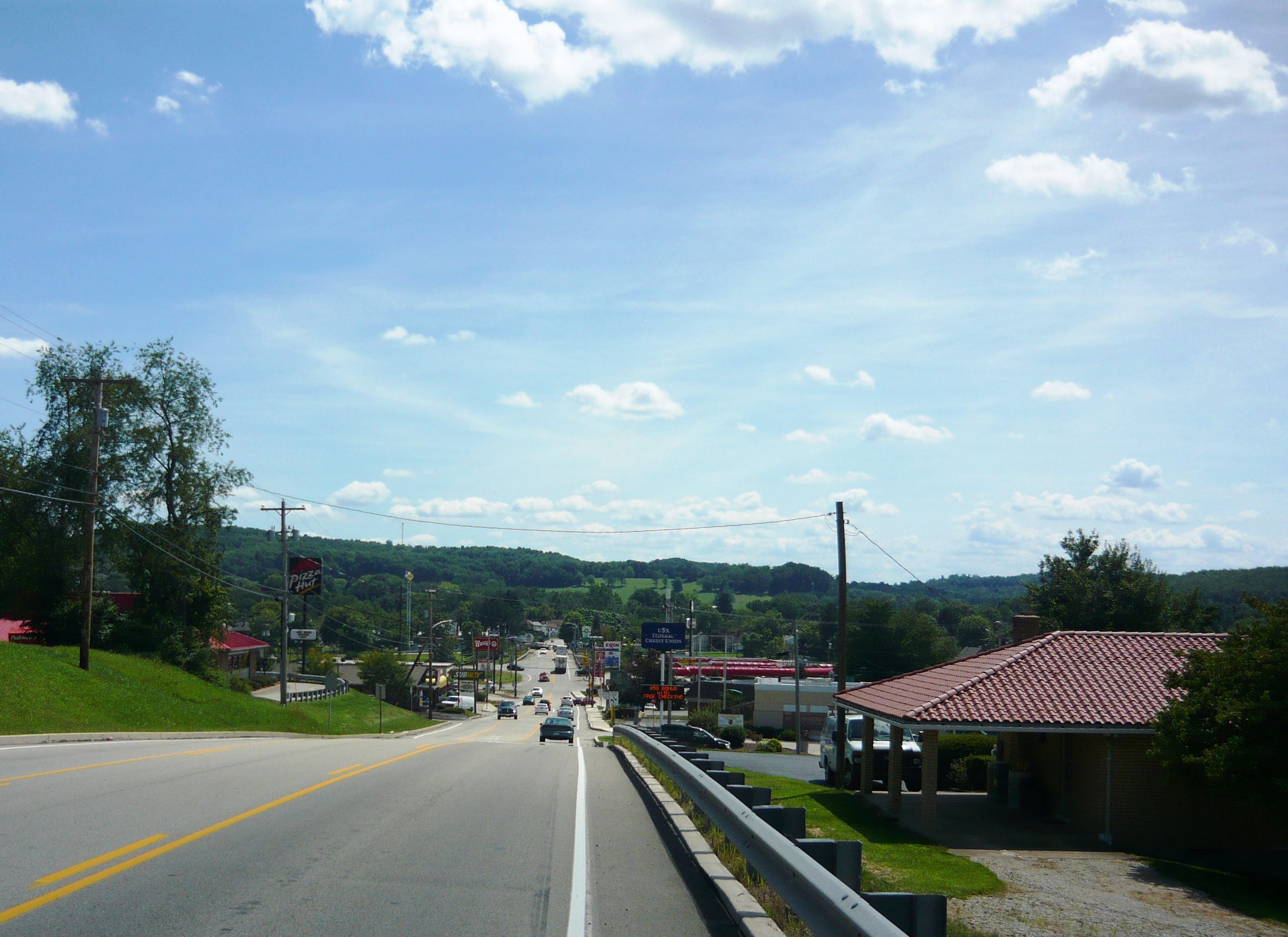
- North Center Avenue, overlooking the business district

- Seal
- Motto: "Highway Hub of Western Pennsylvania" "All Roads Lead home"
- Location of New Stanton in Westmoreland County, Pennsylvania.

- Location within Pennsylvania Location within the United States
- Coordinates: 40°13′12″N 79°36′13″W
- Country: United States
- State: Pennsylvania
- County: Westmoreland

Government
  - Type: Borough Council

Area
  - Total: 4.03 sq mi (10.44 km^{2})
  - Land: 4.01 sq mi (10.38 km^{2})
  - Water: 0.023 sq mi (0.06 km^{2})
- Elevation: 968 ft (295 m)

Population (2020)
  - Total: 2,339
  - Density: 583.8/sq mi (225.42/km^{2})
- Time zone: UTC-5 (Eastern (EST))
  - Summer (DST): UTC-4 (EDT)
- Zip code: 15672
- FIPS code: 42-54104
- Website: www.newstanton.org

New Stanton is a borough in Westmoreland County, Pennsylvania, United States. The population was 2,339 at the 2020 census. New Stanton is often used as a control city in western parts of Pennsylvania, as I-70 joins the Pennsylvania Turnpike (I-76) eastbound towards Breezewood in New Stanton, and is a free highway westbound.

== Geography ==
According to the United States Census Bureau, the borough has a total area of 4.0 square miles (10 km^{2}), of which 3.9 square miles (10 km^{2}) is land and 0.1 square miles (0.26 km^{2}) (1.26%) is water.

=== Surrounding neighborhoods ===
Most of New Stanton is surrounded by Hempfield Township and the borough has two other borders: with Youngwood to the northeast and Hunker to the south-southwest.

== Demographics ==
Historical population
Census	Pop.	Note	%±
1970	1,781		—
1980	2,600		46.0%
1990	2,081		−20.0%
2000	1,906		−8.4%
2010	2,173		14.0%
2020	2,339		7.6%

As of the census of 2000, there were 1,906 people, 870 households, and 508 families residing in the borough. The population density was 484.5 inhabitants per square mile (187.1/km^{2}). There were 957 housing units at an average density of 243.3 per square mile (93.9/km^{2}). The racial makeup of the borough was 96.22% White, 1.89% African American, 0.05% Native American, 0.73% Asian, 0.42% from other races, and 0.68% from two or more races. 1.52% of the population were Hispanic or Latino of any race.

There were 870 households, out of which 22.9% had children under the age of 18 living with them, 45.5% were married couples living together, 10.0% had a female householder with no husband present, and 41.5% were non-families. 34.8% of all households were made up of individuals, and 11.0% had someone living alone who was 65 years of age or older. The average household size was 2.10 and the average family size was 2.72.

In the borough the population was spread out, with 16.9% under the age of 18, 8.4% from 18 to 24, 32.3% from 25 to 44, 27.2% from 45 to 64, and 15.1% who were 65 years of age or older. The median age was 40 years. For every 100 females, there were 96.7 males. For every 100 females age 18 and over, there were 93.3 males.

The median income for a household in the borough was $32,206, and the median income for a family was $38,981. Males had a median income of $33,487 versus $24,276 for females. The per capita income for the borough was $19,358. 12.7% of the population and 10.8% of families were below the poverty line. Out of the total population, 18.4% of those under the age of 18 and 3.3% of those 65 and older were living below the poverty line.

== Economy ==
Volkswagen of America operated the Westmoreland Assembly Plant, in neighboring East Huntingdon Township from 1978 to 1988. Westmoreland, as VWoA called the facility, manufactured the Volkswagen Rabbit, Rabbit truck, Golf, and Jetta. With the downturn of VWoA's sales in the US, the plant was closed on July 14, 1988, and VWoA sold the plant to the Commonwealth of Pennsylvania. It remained dormant until 1990, when Sony announced it would begin manufacturing televisions at the site. The facility employed more than 6,000 by mid-1981 and still over 3,000 people by the late 1990s; however, that number dwindled to just 250 by 2007. On December 9, 2008, the Governor of Pennsylvania announced that Sony planned to close the facility. As of 2010, the 2,000,000-square-foot (190,000 m^{2}) plant remains idle, the largest block of commercial space available in Western Pennsylvania.

UPS has a major sorting operation, processing about 500,000 packages daily off-peak and 1,000,000 during peak season (November and December) and employing approximately 1,700 workers. The building is spread over 49.6 acres and contains about 327,000 square feet—or about seven football fields.

SuperValu has its 724,000-square-foot (67,300 m^{2}) Pittsburgh grocery distribution center in New Stanton, close to I-70, exit 57. Over 500 persons are employed here, serving Shop 'n Save, Save-A-Lot, and County Market stores.
