= Belle Vernon, Pennsylvania =

Borough in Pennsylvania, US

- Borough
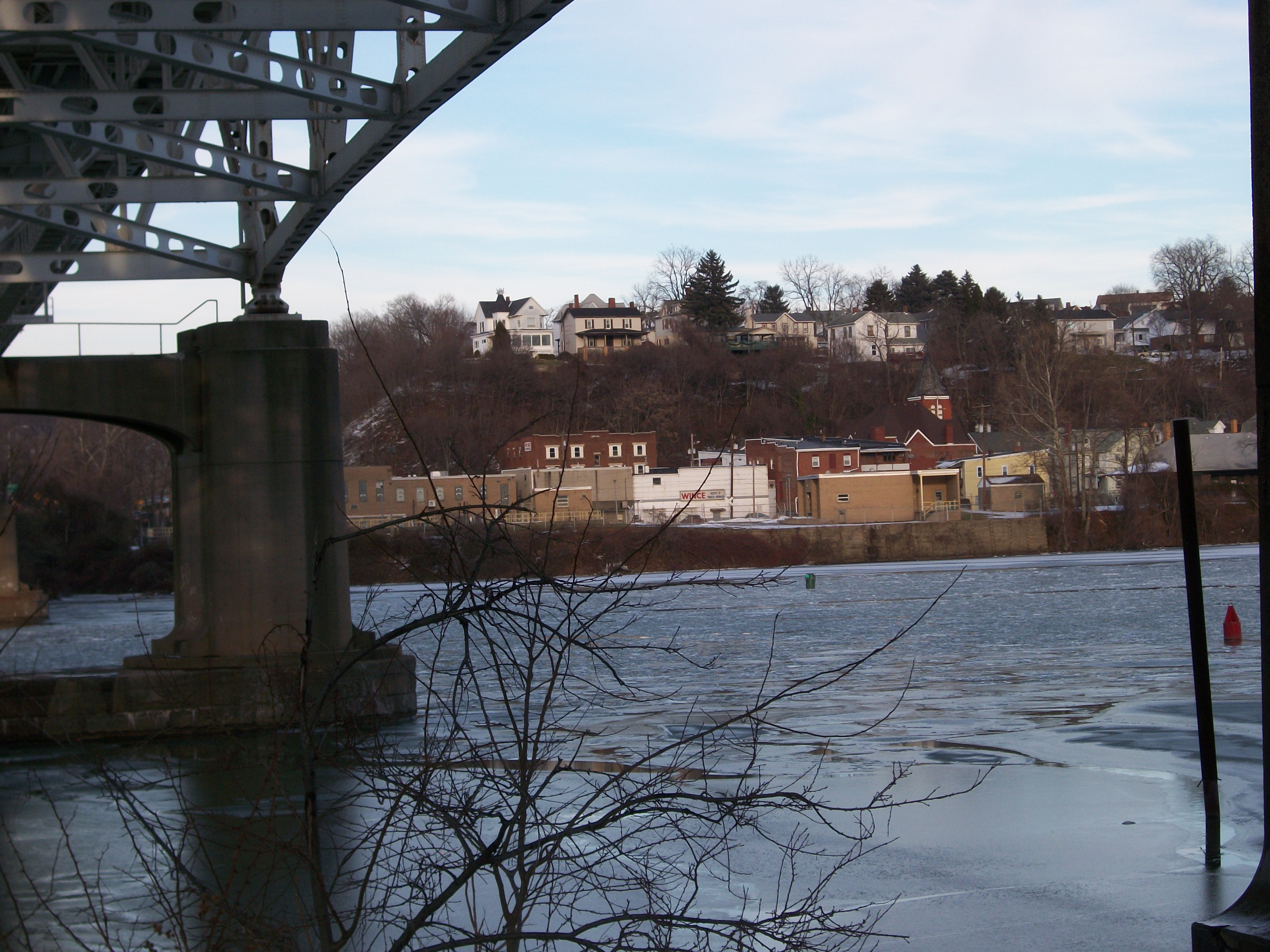
- Belle Vernon, as seen from across the Monongahela River in a view showing the underside of the I-70 bridge looking east-north-east from Speers

- Location of Belle Vernon in Fayette County, Pennsylvania.

- Location of Pennsylvania in the United States
- Coordinates: 40°7′37″N 79°52′6″W
- Country: United States
- State: Pennsylvania
- County: Fayette
- Established: 1813

Government _Mayor - Gerald W. Jackson II

Area
  - Total: 0.33 sq mi (0.85 km^{2})
  - Land: 0.26 sq mi (0.68 km^{2})
  - Water: 0.069 sq mi (0.18 km^{2})
- Highest elevation: 1,080 ft (330 m)
- Lowest elevation: 738 ft (225 m)

Population (2020)
  - Total: 1,024
  - Density: 3,921/sq mi (1,513.8/km^{2})
- Time zone: UTC-4 (EST)
  - Summer (DST): UTC-5 (EDT)
- ZIP code: 15012
- Area code: 724
- FIPS code: 42-05288
- Website: https://bellevernonboro.net/

Belle Vernon is a borough in Fayette County, Pennsylvania, United States. It is situated along the Monongahela River, abutting two other counties, Westmoreland to the north and Washington across the river. As of the 2020 census, Belle Vernon had a population of 1,025.

"Bellevernon", as it was originally spelled, was laid out in 1813 by Noah Speers in northwestern Fayette County. French for "beautiful green", this was the name chosen by both Noah Speers for his little community on the Monongahela River and later by his son Louis, who founded a town with nearly the same name just up the hill (North Belle Vernon). Directly across the river lies the borough of Speers, anchoring the far side of the landmark I-70 bridge as the east bridge abutments lie in adjacent Rostraver Township.

== Geography ==
Belle Vernon is located at 40°7′37″N 79°52′6″W (40.126936, −79.868285), nestled in the northwestern corner of Fayette County, with abutting borders on Washington County, to the west across the river, and Westmoreland County to the north.

According to the United States Census Bureau, the borough has a total area of 0.31 square miles (0.81 km^{2}), of which 0.25 square miles (0.65 km^{2}) is land and 0.07 square miles (0.17 km^{2}), or 20.29%, is water.

== Surrounding and adjacent neighborhoods ==
Belle Vernon has three land borders with Washington Township to the southeast and the Westmoreland County neighborhoods of North Belle Vernon to the north and Rostraver Township to the northwest.

Across the Monongahela River to the south in Washington County, Belle Vernon runs adjacent with the aforementioned borough of Speers as well as Dunlevy.

== History ==
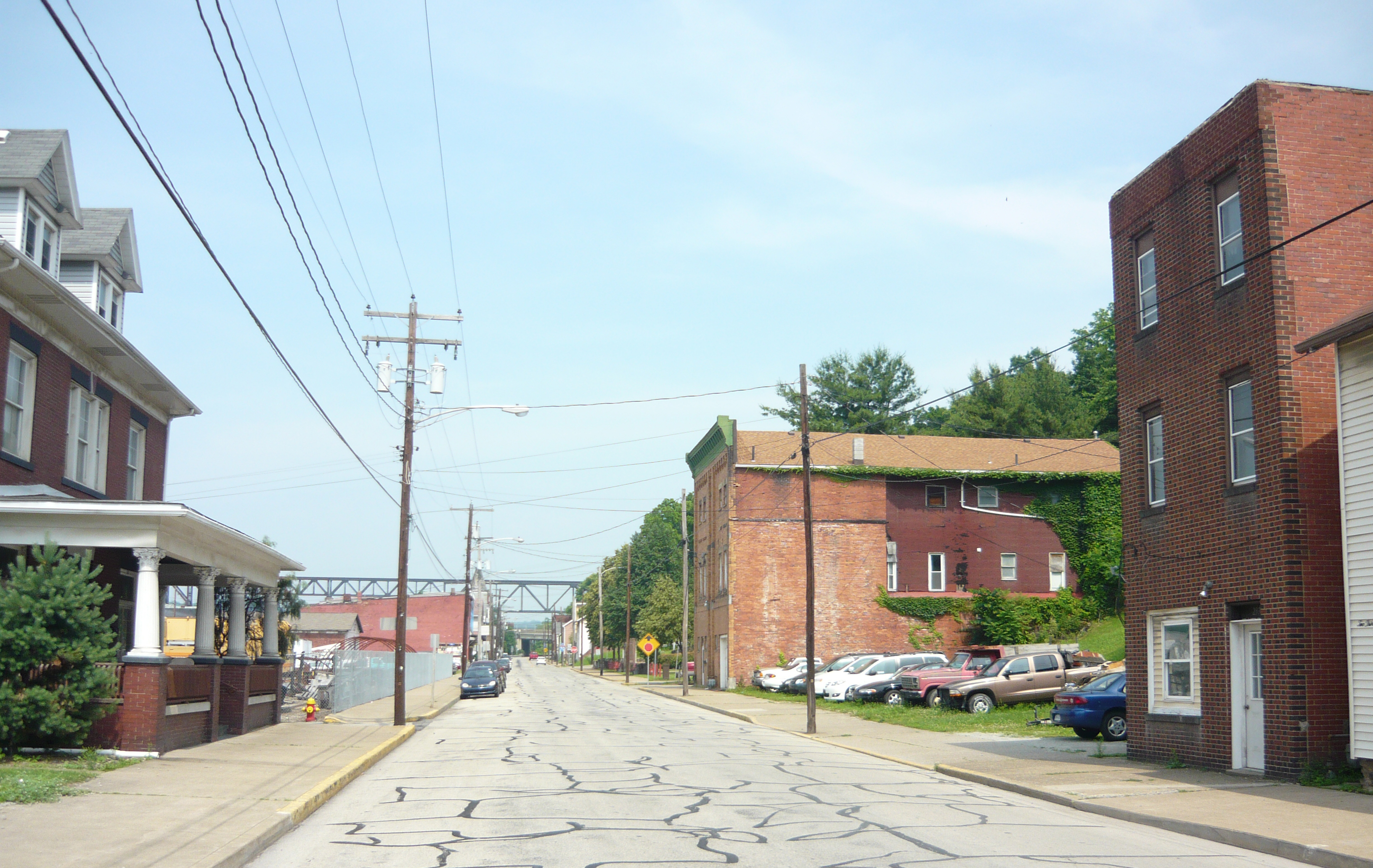
Main Street

Noah Speers was the father of Louis M. Speers, born in a log cabin on the Speers homestead/Gibsonton farm in 1810. The younger Speers played a large role in the development of Belle Vernon. During his lifetime, the population grew to about 700, and there was a steam ferry connecting Belle Vernon with Allen Township across the river. The little hamlet boasted five dry goods stores, four groceries, two glasshouses with 87 employees, a boot and shoe, cabinet, chair, wagon, saddle/harness, blacksmith/tanning shops, and two sawmills. Louis Speers owned a sandbank outside of town which produced the best quality glass sand. He also owned a large coal works and a large boat yard with more than 50 employees. Louis resided on the northwest corner of Main and 2nd streets.

Boat hulls were built at his boatyard (owned in partnership with a man named Morgan Gaskill), located on 3rd Street in the 1830s and 1840s. Several steamboats are noted to have come from the yard, including the Minstrel, which in 1842 fell off its building docks killing one and injuring 10. The St. Anthony bound for Galena, Illinois, and the Cassandra headed to Knoxville, Tennessee, came from the Belle Vernon yard. Two boats bound for customers in Pittsburgh were the Alert and the Avalanche (1847).

In 1853, Mr. Speers built a sawmill with partner William Latta, a boat builder, below the mouth of Speers Run. It was destroyed by fire in 1877 and rebuilt by his son William F. Speers. William, who spent three months in Libby Prison during the Civil War, left the army after attaining the rank of lieutenant colonel. William went bankrupt soon after completing the new mill and sold it to the Belle Vernon Saw and Planing Company in 1880.

The small village of Speers across the river, laid out in 1860 by a kinsman, gets its name from the same family. North Belle Vernon, in Westmoreland County, was laid out in 1872 by Louis and was incorporated in 1876. Louis died two years later in 1878 and is buried at the Rehoboth Presbyterian Church Cemetery.

Samuel Dougherty, a carpenter, is claimed to have built the first dwelling in North Belle Vernon on Broad Avenue near Spring Alley. He was justice of the peace, council member, school director, and judge of election, all at the same time. The first two industries were a foundry in 1873 on Broad Avenue above Spring Alley and a flour mill on Speer Street in 1874. Most of these early buildings surrounded the intersection of Short Street and Broad Avenue. Lots were not sold until 1900 and the area beyond Arch Street then began to build up.

== Demographics ==
Historical population
Census	Pop.	Note	%±
1870	906		—
1880	1,164		28.5%
1890	1,147		−1.5%
1900	1,901		65.7%
1910	2,372		24.8%
1920	2,342		−1.3%
1930	2,489		6.3%
1940	2,463		−1.0%
1950	2,271		−7.8%
1960	1,784		−21.4%
1970	1,496		−16.1%
1980	1,489		−0.5%
1990	1,213		−18.5%
2000	1,211		−0.2%
2010	1,093		−9.7%
2020	1,024		−6.3%
2021 (est.)	1,011	▼	−1.3%

As of the 2000 census, there were 1,211 people, 612 households, and 288 families residing in the borough. The population density was 4,647.4 inhabitants per square mile (1,794.4/km^{2}). There were 716 housing units at an average density of 2,747.7 per square mile (1,060.9/km^{2}). The racial makeup of the borough was 96.12% White, 2.15% African American, 0.08% Native American, 0.41% Asian, 0.25% from other races, and 0.99% from two or more races. Hispanic or Latino of any race were 0.91% of the population.

There were 612 households, out of which 17.8% had children under the age of 18 living with them, 32.7% were married couples living together, 9.6% had a female householder with no husband present, and 52.9% were non-families. 48.9% of all households were made up of individuals, and 30.4% had someone living alone who was 65 years of age or older. The average household size was 1.96 and the average family size was 2.89.

In the borough the population was spread out, with 17.1% under the age of 18, 7.8% from 18 to 24, 25.1% from 25 to 44, 21.1% from 45 to 64, and 28.8% who were 65 years of age or older. The median age was 45 years. For every 100 females, there were 80.5 males. For every 100 females age 18 and over, there were 75.8 males.

The median income for a household in the borough was $18,068, and the median income for a family was $36,094. Males had a median income of $22,434 versus $20,950 for females. The per capita income for the borough was $12,919. About 5.8% of families and 16.2% of the population were below the poverty line, including 21.7% of those under age 18 and 23.1% of those age 65 or over.

== Education ==
The borough, along with the abutting communities on the right bank of the Monongahela such as Fayette City and North Belle Vernon, is served by the Belle Vernon Area School District, whose buildings are located in adjacent Rostraver Township in Westmoreland County.

== Notable people ==
- Jesse M. Bowell, Pennsylvania state legislator (1885–1886)
- Gene Dodaro, Comptroller General of the United States (2010–2025), Chief, Government Accounting Office (GAO)
- Dorian Johnson, American football player.
- Frank Mascara, U.S. Representative from Pennsylvania (1995–2003)
- Robert Mountsier, author, journalist and literary agent
- Bert Rechichar, NFL defensive back and kicker
