= Rostraver Township, Pennsylvania =

Township in Pennsylvania, US

Coordinates: 40°10′15″N 79°47′59″W

- Township
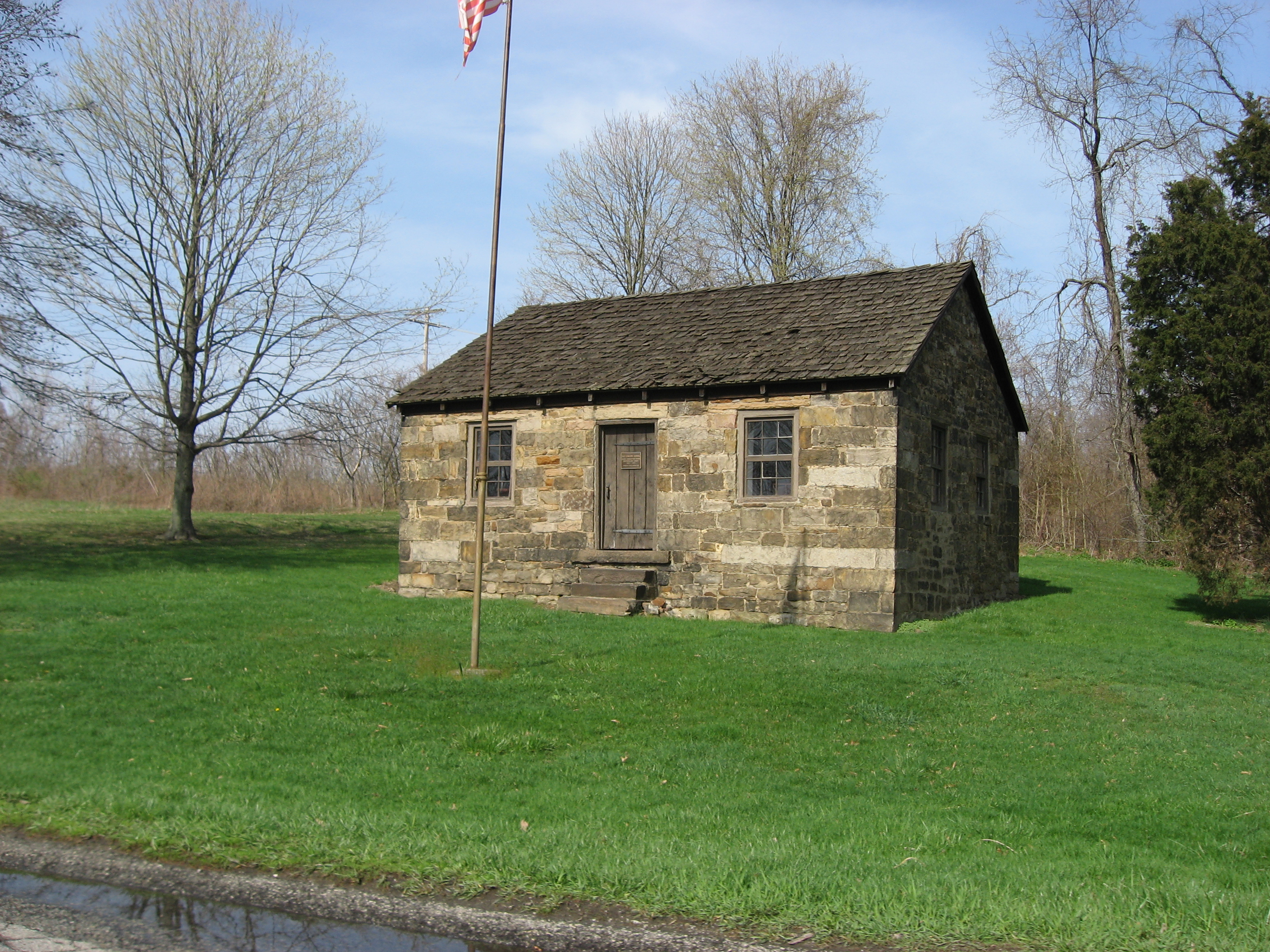
- The Old Concord School, built 1830

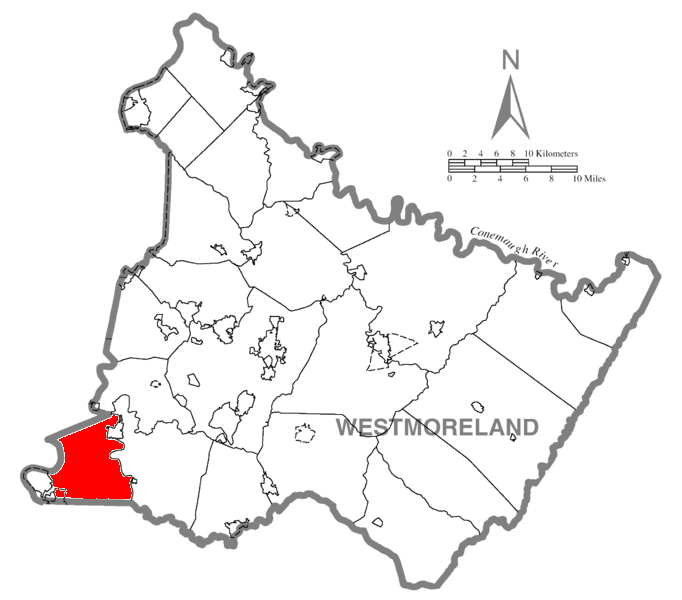
- Map of Westmoreland County, Pennsylvania Highlighting Rostraver Township

- Map of Pennsylvania highlighting Westmoreland County
- Country: United States
- State: Pennsylvania
- County: Westmoreland

Government
  - Type: Board of commissioners

Area
  - Total: 32.95 sq mi (85.34 km^{2})
  - Land: 32.28 sq mi (83.61 km^{2})
  - Water: 0.67 sq mi (1.73 km^{2})

Population (2020)
  - Total: 11,374 ▲
  - Estimate (2021): 11,361
  - Density: 343.5/sq mi (132.63/km^{2})
- Time zone: UTC-5 (Eastern (EST))
  - Summer (DST): UTC-4 (EDT)
- FIPS code: 42-129-66376
- Website: http://www.rostraver.us

Rostraver Township is a township in Westmoreland County, Pennsylvania, United States. The population was 11,374 at the 2020 census.

== History ==
Rostraver Township is in the southwestern corner of Westmoreland County and is the location of the Household No. 1 Site, which was once occupied by a Monongahela village. It is listed on the National Register of Historic Places.

The name of the township has been traced back to Rostrevor, a seaside community in County Down, now in Northern Ireland. It is known that some of the early settlers, such as the McClains, came from County Down so it is surmised that they probably named their new community out of affection for the native village and spelled it phonetically as Rostraver Unfortunately, they neglected to leave to posterity any record of having done so.

== Geography ==
According to the United States Census Bureau, the township has a total area of 32.9 square miles (85.2 km^{2}), of which 32.2 square miles (83.4 km^{2}) is land and 0.7 square miles (1.8 km^{2}; 2.13%) is water.

== Surrounding and adjacent neighborhoods ==
Rostraver Township has eight land borders, including Elizabeth Township in Allegheny County to the north, West Newton to the northwest, Perry and Washington Townships in Fayette County to the south, North Belle Vernon and Belle Vernon (the latter in Fayette County) to the southwest, Monessen to the west-southwest, and Forward Township in Allegheny County to the northwest.

Across the Monongahela River to the west, Rostraver runs adjacent with six Washington County neighborhoods, including (from north to south): Carroll Township, Donora, another segment of Carroll Township, Fallowfield Township, North Charleroi, Charleroi, and Speers (connected by the Belle Vernon Bridge on I-70).

Across the Youghiogheny River to the east, Rostraver runs adjacent almost entirely with South Huntingdon, the exceptions being Sewickley Township, West Newton and Smithton.

== Demographics ==
Historical population
| Census | Pop. | Note | %± |
|---|---|---|---|
| 1990 | 11,224 | | — |
| 2000 | 11,634 | | 3.7% |
| 2010 | 11,363 | | −2.3% |
| 2020 | 11,374 | | 0.1% |
| 2021 (est.) | 11,361 | | −0.1% |
U.S. Decennial Census

As of the census of 2000, there were 11,634 people, 4,590 households, and 3,442 families residing in the township. The population density was 361.5 inhabitants per square mile (139.6/km^{2}). There were 4,920 housing units at an average density of 152.9 per square mile (59.0/km^{2}). The racial makeup of the township was 96.90% White, 1.94% African American, 0.12% Native American, 0.28% Asian, 0.03% Pacific Islander, 0.16% from other races, and 0.57% from two or more races. Hispanic or Latino of any race were 0.52% of the population.

There were 4,590 households, out of which 30.8% had children under the age of 18 living with them, 60.6% were married couples living together, 10.5% had a female householder with no husband present, and 25.0% were non-families. 22.2% of all households were made up of individuals, and 10.1% had someone living alone who was 65 years of age or older. The average household size was 2.53 and the average family size was 2.96.

In the township the population was spread out, with 23.4% under the age of 18, 6.2% from 18 to 24, 28.3% from 25 to 44, 25.6% from 45 to 64, and 16.5% who were 65 years of age or older. The median age was 41 years. For every 100 females there were 95.3 males. For every 100 females age 18 and over, there were 92.5 males. The median income for a household in the township was $39,538, and the median income for a family was $48,115. Males had a median income of $36,860 versus $26,799 for females. The per capita income for the township was $20,455. About 5.5% of families and 6.6% of the population were below the poverty line, including 11.8% of those under age 18 and 2.7% of those age 65 or over.

== Public services ==
The township is protected by a full-time police force, headquartered at the municipal complex on Municipal Drive. Rostraver Township is also home to the Belle Vernon Barracks of the Pennsylvania State Police, which is located on Circle Drive. Fire protection is provided by two volunteer fire companies. Rostraver Township Fire Department and Collinsburg VFCrespond to calls for assistance. Emergency medical response is handled by Rostraver/West Newton Emergency Services.
