= North Belle Vernon, Pennsylvania =

Borough in Pennsylvania, US

- Borough
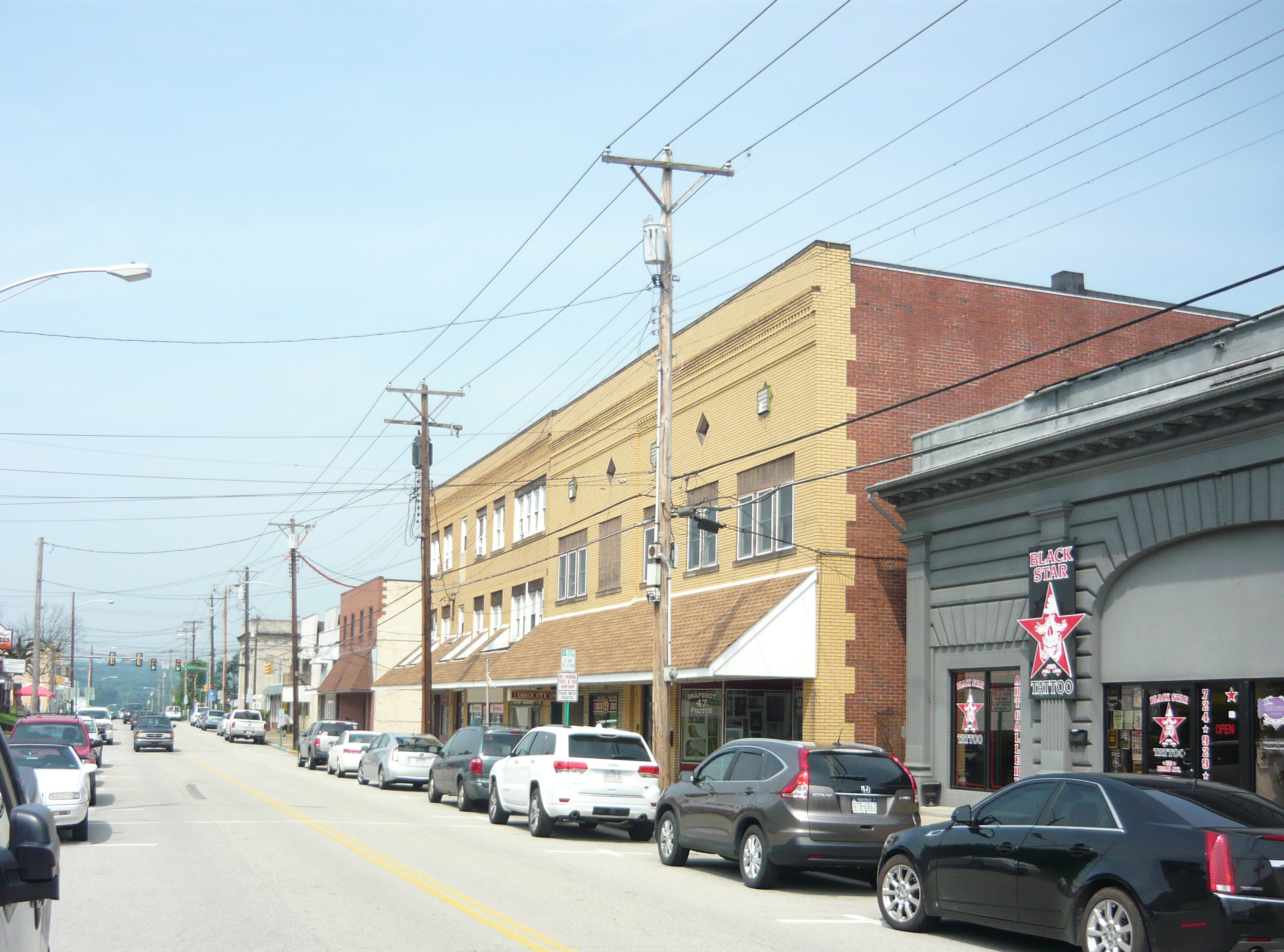
- Broad Avenue

- Country: United States
- State: Pennsylvania
- County: Westmoreland
- Settled: 1758
- Incorporated: February 26, 1876

Government
  - Type: Borough Council
  - Mayor: Craig Ambrose

Area
  - Total: 0.42 sq mi (1.09 km^{2})
  - Land: 0.42 sq mi (1.09 km^{2})
  - Water: 0 sq mi (0.00 km^{2})
- Elevation: 945 ft (288 m)

Population (2020)
  - Total: 1,873
  - Density: 4,463.1/sq mi (1,723.21/km^{2})
- Time zone: UTC-5 (Eastern (EST))
  - Summer (DST): UTC-4 (EDT)
- Zip code: 15012
- FIPS code: 42-54776

North Belle Vernon is a borough in Westmoreland County, Pennsylvania, United States. As of the 2020 census, North Belle Vernon had a population of 1,873.

== Geography ==
Located south of Pittsburgh adjacent to Interstate Highway 70, the borough has a total area of 0.4 square miles (1.0 km^{2}), all of it land, with the Monongahela River to the southwest.

The Pittsburgh Coal Seam and several abandoned coal mines lie beneath North Belle Vernon. Mine subsidence has been an issue, and state-funded remediation has been undertaken.

== Demographics ==
Historical population
Census	Pop.	Note	%±
1880	208		—
1890	435		109.1%
1900	810		86.2%
1910	1,522		87.9%
1920	2,605		71.2%
1930	3,072		17.9%
1940	3,022		−1.6%
1950	3,147		4.1%
1960	3,148		0.0%
1970	2,916		−7.4%
1980	2,425		−16.8%
1990	2,112		−12.9%
2000	2,107		−0.2%
2010	1,971		−6.5%
2020	1,873		−5.0%

As of the census of 2020, there were 850 households and 956 housing units in the borough. The racial makeup of the borough was 93.2% White, 4.5% African American, and 2.3% from other races. The median income was $52,928.

== See also ==
- Community web site.
- Discover Westmoreland: North Belle Vernon borough
- North Belle Vernon (Green Street Subsidence) Abandoned Mine Reclamation. Pennsylvania Department of Environmental Protection, Office of Active and Abandoned Mine Operations.
