= List of places in Pennsylvania: Lo–Ly =

This list of cities, towns, unincorporated communities, counties, and other recognized places in the U.S. state of Pennsylvania also includes information on the number and names of counties in which the place lies, and its lower and upper Zip Code bounds if applicable.

Name of place	Number of counties	Principal county	Lower zip code	Upper zip code
Loag	1	Chester County	19520	
Lobachsville	1	Berks County	19547	
Loch Lomond Junction	1	Centre County		
Lochiel	1	Union County	17837	
Lochland	1	Lehigh County		
Lochvale	1	Indiana County		
Lock Haven	1	Clinton County	17745	
Locke Mills	1	Mifflin County	17063	
Lockport	1	Clinton County	17745	
Lockport	1	Mifflin County	17044	
Lockport	1	Northampton County		
Lockport	1	Westmoreland County	15923	
Locksley	1	Delaware County	19342	
Lockview	1	Washington County	15022	
Lockville	1	Wyoming County		
Lockwood	1	Cameron County		
Locust	1	Indiana County	15771	
Locust Dale	2	Columbia County		
Locust Dale	2	Schuylkill County		
Locust Gap	1	Northumberland County	17840	
Locust Gap Junction	1	Northumberland County		
Locust Grove	1	Centre County		
Locust Grove	1	Chester County	19380	
Locust Grove	1	Lancaster County		
Locust Grove	1	Snyder County		
Locust Grove	1	York County	17402	
Locust Hill	1	Fayette County		
Locust Lakes Village	1	Monroe County		
Locust Point	1	Cumberland County	17055	
Locust Ridge	1	Allegheny County	15209	
Locust Run	1	Juniata County	17094	
Locust Spring	1	York County		
Locust Summit	1	Northumberland County	17840	
Locust Township	1	Columbia County		
Locust Valley	1	Lehigh County	18036	
Locust Valley	1	Schuylkill County	18214	
Locustdale	2	Columbia County	17945	
Locustdale	2	Schuylkill County	17945	
Lodi	1	Bucks County		
Lofty	1	Schuylkill County	18201	
Log Pile	1	Washington County	15301	
Logan	1	Indiana County		
Logan	1	Philadelphia County	19141	
Logan Mills	1	Clinton County	17747	
Logan Township	1	Blair County		
Logan Township	1	Clinton County		
Logan Township	1	Huntingdon County		
Logans Ferry	1	Allegheny County	15068	
Logans Ferry Heights	1	Allegheny County	15068	
Logansport	1	Armstrong County	16226	
Loganton	1	Clinton County	17747	
Loganville	1	York County	17342	
Logue	1	Potter County		
Loleta	1	Elk County		
London	1	Mercer County	16127	
London Britain Township	1	Chester County		
London Grove	1	Chester County	19348	
London Grove Township	1	Chester County		
Londonderry Township	1	Bedford County		
Londonderry Township	1	Chester County		
Londonderry Township	1	Dauphin County		
Lone Pine	1	Washington County	15301	
Lonely Acres	1	Cambria County	15722	
Long Acre Park	1	Delaware County	19050	
Long Branch	1	Washington County	15423	
Long Bridge	1	Westmoreland County		
Long Brook	1	Sullivan County		
Long Pond	1	Monroe County	18334	
Long Run	1	Cambria County		
Long Run	1	Carbon County	18235	
Long Valley	1	Bradford County		
Longfellow	1	Mifflin County	17044	
Longlevel	1	York County	17368	
Longmead Farms	1	Philadelphia County		
Longs Crossroad	1	Cambria County		
Longsdale	1	Berks County		
Longsdorf	1	Cumberland County		
Longstown	1	York County	17402	
Longswamp	1	Berks County	19539	
Longswamp Township	1	Berks County		
Longview	1	Allegheny County	15102	
Longwood	1	Chester County	19348	
Lookabough Corners	1	Armstrong County	15656	
Lookout	1	Wayne County	18417	
Loomis Park	1	Luzerne County	18702	
Loop	1	Blair County		
Loop	1	Indiana County		
Loop Station	1	Blair County	16648	
Lopez	1	Sullivan County	18628	
Lorain	1	Cambria County	15902	
Lorane	1	Berks County	19606	
Lorberry	1	Schuylkill County	17963	
Lorberry Junction	1	Schuylkill County		
Lords Valley	1	Pike County	18428	
Lorenton	2	Lycoming County	16938	
Lorenton	2	Tioga County	16938	
Loretto	1	Cambria County	15940	
Loschs	1	Juniata County	17049	
Losh Run	1	Perry County	17020	
Lost Creek	1	Schuylkill County	17946	
Lottsville	1	Warren County	16402	
Loucks Mills	1	Potter County		
Louden Hill	1	Susquehanna County		
Lovedale	1	Allegheny County	15037	
Lovejoy	1	Indiana County	15729	
Lovell	1	Erie County	16407	
Lovelton	1	Wyoming County	18629	
Lovely	1	Bedford County	15521	
Lover	1	Washington County	15022	
Lovett	1	Cambria County		
Lovi	1	Beaver County		
Low Hill	1	Washington County	15429	
Lowber	1	Fayette County	15438	
Lowber	1	Westmoreland County	15660	
Lowell	1	Snyder County		
Lower Allen	1	Cumberland County	17011	
Lower Allen Township	1	Cumberland County		
Lower Alsace Township	1	Berks County		
Lower Askam	1	Luzerne County	18706	
Lower Augusta Township	1	Northumberland County		
Lower Brownville	1	Schuylkill County		
Lower Burrell	1	Westmoreland County	15068	
Lower Chanceford Township	1	York County		
Lower Chichester Township	1	Delaware County		
Lower Dutchtown	1	Cambria County		
Lower Feltonville	1	Delaware County		
Lower Frankford Township	1	Cumberland County		
Lower Frederick Township	1	Montgomery County		
Lower Gwynedd Township	1	Montgomery County		
Lower Heidelberg Township	1	Berks County		
Lower Hillville	1	Armstrong County		
Lower Hopewell	1	Chester County		
Lower Longswamp	1	Berks County	19539	
Lower Macungie Township	1	Lehigh County		
Lower Mahanoy Township	1	Northumberland County		
Lower Makefield Township	1	Bucks County		
Lower Merion Township	1	Montgomery County		
Lower Mifflin Township	1	Cumberland County	17241	
Lower Milford Township	1	Lehigh County		
Lower Mill	1	Northampton County		
Lower Moreland Township	1	Montgomery County		
Lower Mount Bethel Township	1	Northampton County		
Lower Nazareth Township	1	Northampton County		
Lower Orchard	1	Bucks County	19058	
Lower Oxford Township	1	Chester County		
Lower Paxton Township	1	Dauphin County	17109	
Lower Peanut	1	Fayette County	15480	
Lower Pottsgrove Township	1	Montgomery County		
Lower Providence Township	1	Montgomery County		
Lower Sagon	1	Northumberland County	17877	
Lower Salford Township	1	Montgomery County		
Lower Saucon Township	1	Northampton County		
Lower Southampton Township	1	Bucks County		
Lower Swatara Township	1	Dauphin County		
Lower Tannersville	1	Monroe County		
Lower Towamensing Township	1	Carbon County		
Lower Turkeyfoot Township	1	Somerset County		
Lower Tyrone Township	1	Fayette County		
Lower Whyel	1	Westmoreland County		
Lower Windsor Township	1	York County		
Lower Yoder Township	1	Cambria County		
Lowhill Township	1	Lehigh County		
Lowville	1	Erie County	16442	
Loyalhanna	1	Westmoreland County	15661	
Loyalhanna Township	1	Westmoreland County		
Loyalhanna Woodlands Number 1	1	Westmoreland County	15681	
Loyalhanna Woodlands Number 2	1	Westmoreland County	15681	
Loyalsock Township	1	Lycoming County		
Loyalsockville	1	Lycoming County	17754	
Loyalton	1	Dauphin County	17048	
Loyalville	1	Luzerne County	18612	
Loysburg	1	Bedford County	16659	
Loysburg Gap	1	Bedford County		
Loysville	1	Perry County	17047	
Lucas	1	Allegheny County		
Lucasville	1	Butler County		
Lucerne	1	Indiana County		
Lucerne Junction	1	Indiana County		
Lucerne Mines (or Lucernemines)	1	Indiana County	15754	
Luces Corners	1	Crawford County		
Lucesco	1	Westmoreland County	15656	
Lucinda	1	Clarion County	16235	
Luciusboro	1	Indiana County	15748	
Lucket	1	Cambria County		
Lucknow	1	Dauphin County	17110	
Lucky	1	York County	17322	
Lucon	1	Montgomery County	18969	
Lucullus	1	Lycoming County		
Lucy Crossing	1	Northampton County	18042	
Lucy Furnace	1	Mifflin County	17066	
Ludlow	1	McKean County	16333	
Ludwigs Corner	1	Chester County	19343	
Luellen	1	Washington County		
Luke	1	Northumberland County		
Luke Fidler	1	Northumberland County	17872	
Lumar Park	1	Philadelphia County		
Lumber	1	Clearfield County		
Lumber City	1	Clearfield County	16833	
Lumber City	1	Mifflin County		
Lumber Township	1	Cameron County		
Lumberville	1	Bucks County	18933	
Lundys Lane	1	Erie County	16401	
Lungerville	1	Lycoming County	17774	
Lurgan	1	Franklin County	17232	
Lurgan Township	1	Franklin County		
Lushbaugh	1	Cameron County		
Lusk	1	Westmoreland County		
Luthers Mills	1	Bradford County	18848	
Luthersburg	1	Clearfield County	15848	
Lutztown	1	Cumberland County	17013	
Lutzville	1	Bedford County	15537	
Luxor	1	Westmoreland County	15662	
Luzerne	1	Fayette County	15450	
Luzerne	1	Luzerne County	18709	
Luzerne Township	1	Fayette County		
Lycippus	1	Westmoreland County	15650	
Lycoming Township	1	Lycoming County		
Lykens	1	Dauphin County	17048	
Lykens Township	1	Dauphin County		
Lyleville	1	Clearfield County	16627	
Lymanville	1	Susquehanna County		
Lymehurst	1	Lycoming County		
Lynces Junction	1	Crawford County		
Lynch	1	Forest County	16347	
Lynchville	1	Elk County	15857	
Lyndell	1	Chester County	19354	
Lyndon	1	Lancaster County	17602	
Lyndora	1	Butler County	16045	
Lynn	1	Susquehanna County	18844	
Lynn Township	1	Lehigh County		
Lynnewood	1	Montgomery County	19150	
Lynnewood Gardens	1	Montgomery County	19117	
Lynnport	1	Lehigh County	18066	
Lynnville	1	Lehigh County	18066	
Lynwood	1	Berks County	19607	
Lynnwood	2	Fayette County	15012	
Lynnwood	2	Westmoreland County	15012	
Lynnwood	1	Luzerne County	18702	
Lynnwood Park	1	Delaware County	19083	
Lynnwood-Pricedale	2	Fayette County		
Lynnwood-Pricedale	2	Westmoreland County		
Lynoak	1	Berks County	19607	
Lyon Station	1	Berks County	19536	
Lyon Valley	1	Lehigh County	18066	
Lyona	1	Crawford County		
Lyons	1	Berks County	19536	
Lyons Run Mine	1	Westmoreland County	15085	
Lyonstown	1	Centre County		
