= Fairhope, Fayette County, Pennsylvania =

Unincorporated community in Pennsylvania, United States

- Census-designated place
- Location within Pennsylvania Location within the United States
- Coordinates: 40°06′54″N 79°50′20″W
- Country: United States
- State: Pennsylvania
- County: Fayette
- Township: Washington

Area
  - Total: 0.85 sq mi (2.19 km^{2})
  - Land: 0.85 sq mi (2.19 km^{2})
  - Water: 0 sq mi (0.00 km^{2})
- Elevation: 938 ft (286 m)

Population (2020)
  - Total: 1,146
  - Density: 1,354.6/sq mi (523.03/km^{2})
- Time zone: UTC-5 (Eastern (EST))
  - Summer (DST): UTC-4 (EDT)
- FIPS code: 42-24664
- GNIS feature ID: 2631264

Fairhope is an unincorporated community and census-designated place in Washington Township, Fayette County, Pennsylvania, United States. It is in the northwestern corner of Fayette County, bordered by Lynwood to the northwest, Naomi to the west, and Arnold City to the east. The borough of Belle Vernon is 2 miles (3 km) to the northwest. Pennsylvania Route 201 passes through Fairhope, leading north to Interstate 70 and south to Fayette City. As of the 2010 census, the population of this place was 1,151.

== Demographics ==
Historical population
Census	Pop.	Note	%±
2020	1,146		—
U.S. Decennial Census

The 2020 United States census gave the population as 1,146 people.
