= Laurel Run (Jacobs Creek tributary) =

Stream in Pennsylvania, USA

Laurel Run Tributary to Jacobs Creek
- Location of Laurel Run mouth Laurel Run (Jacobs Creek tributary) (the United States)

Location
- Country: United States
- State: Pennsylvania
- County: Westmoreland

Physical characteristics
- Source: Brush Run divide
  - location: about 1 mile east of Kecksburg, Pennsylvania
  - coordinates: 40°10′54″N 079°25′45″W
  - elevation: 1,520 ft (460 m)
- Mouth: Jacobs Creek
  - location: about 0.25 miles north-northeast of Laurelville, Pennsylvania
  - coordinates: 40°09′12″N 079°28′31″W
  - elevation: 1,235 ft (376 m)
- Length: 3.76 mi (6.05 km)
- Basin size: 4.16 square miles (10.8 km^{2})
- Discharge
  - location: Jacobs Creek
  - average: 7.34 cu ft/s (0.208 m^{3}/s) at mouth with Jacobs Creek

Basin features
- Progression: southwest
- River system: Monongahela River
- Tributaries
  - left: unnamed tributaries
  - right: unnamed tributaries
- Bridges: Clay Pike, McGinnis Road, Laurelville Mennonite Road

Laurel Run is a 3.76 mi (6.05 km) long 2nd order tributary to Jacobs Creek in Westmoreland County, Pennsylvania.

== Course ==
Laurel Run rises about 1 mile east of Kecksburg, Pennsylvania, and then flows southwest to join Jacobs Creek about 0.25 miles north-northeast of Laurelville.

== Watershed ==
Laurel Run drains 4.16 square miles (10.8 km^{2}) of area, receives about 45.2 in/year of precipitation, has a wetness index of 406.12, and is about 77% forested.
