= Lowber, Pennsylvania =

Lowber, Pennsylvania may refer to the following places in the U.S. state of Pennsylvania:

- Lowber, Fayette County, Pennsylvania
- Lowber, Westmoreland County, Pennsylvania
