= Arnold City, Pennsylvania =

Unincorporated community in Pennsylvania, US

- Census-designated place
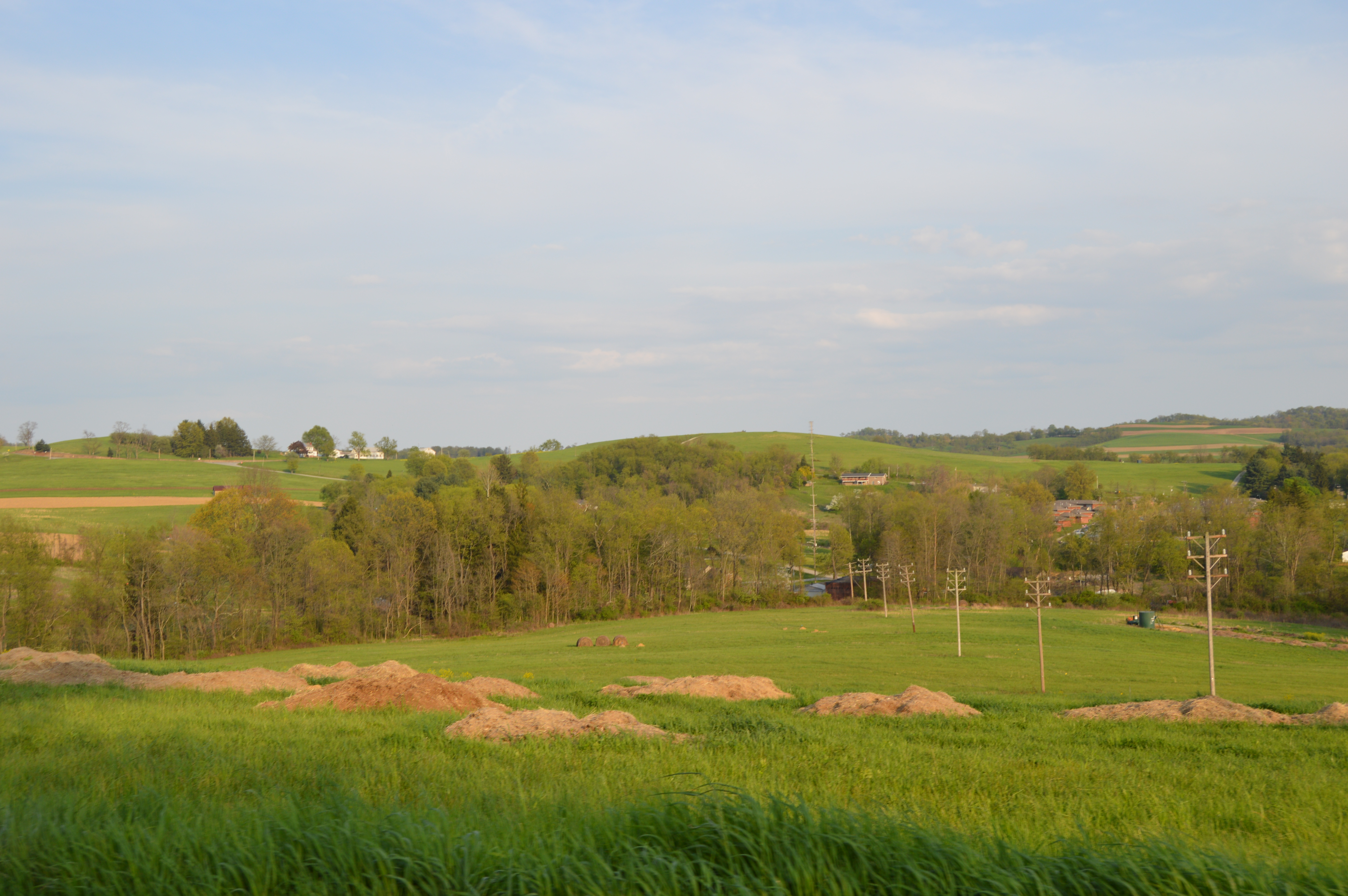
- Overview from the northwest

- Location within Pennsylvania Location within the United States
- Coordinates: 40°6′59″N 79°49′30″W
- Country: United States
- State: Pennsylvania
- County: Fayette
- Township: Washington

Area
  - Total: 0.48 sq mi (1.24 km^{2})
  - Land: 0.48 sq mi (1.24 km^{2})
  - Water: 0 sq mi (0.00 km^{2})
- Elevation: 950 ft (290 m)

Population (2020)
  - Total: 462
  - Density: 961.7/sq mi (371.32/km^{2})
- Time zone: UTC-5 (Eastern (EST))
  - Summer (DST): UTC-4 (EDT)
- FIPS code: 42-03096
- GNIS feature ID: 1168409

Arnold City is an unincorporated community and census-designated place in Washington Township, Fayette County, Pennsylvania, United States. It is located approximately 3 miles (5 km) east of the borough of Belle Vernon, in far northwestern Fayette County. As of the 2020 census, Arnold City had a population of 462.

== Demographics ==
Historical population
Census	Pop.	Note	%±
2020	462		—
U.S. Decennial Census

== History ==
Like many towns in the area, Arnold City has been home to many coal miners supporting the coal industry in the region. The town supported housing for several nearby coal mines, including the Naomi Mine in Fayette City. Housing was constructed by the Hillman Coal and Coke Company, creating a Coal Patch Town,

In addition to the Naomi mine, four additional mines operated in the area:

- Arnold No. 1 Mine, Arnold City, Fayette Co., PA
- Arnold No. 2 Mine, Arnold City, Fayette Co., PA
- Arnold No. 3 Mine, Arnold City, Fayette Co., PA
- Hill Top Mine & Coke Works, near Arnold City, Washington Twp., Fayette Co., PA

The village was the location of mine strike-related violence in 1931.
