= J. Hartwell Hillman Jr. =

John Hartwell Hillman Jr. (1880–1959) was an American businessman who was active in coal, steel and gas.

== Early life and career ==
Hillman was born in 1880 to J. Hartwell Hillman Sr. and his wife, Sallie Murfree Frazer. His father was the founder of the Hillman Coal and Coke Company.

Hillman headed his family's company, J. H. Hillman & Sons, in partnership with his brothers Ernest Hillman (1883–1969) and James Frazier Hillman (1888–1972). Eventually, the company became Pittsburgh Coke & Chemical, which is now Calgon Carbon.

== Hillman House ==
In 1919, Hillman bought a late-1870s red-brick, three-storey house at "Millionaires' Row" on Fifth Avenue in Pittsburgh, which had been built for James Rees, a boat and engine builder. Initially, Hillman engaged the architect Benno Janssen to design a new residence. However, he changed his mind and had Edward Mellon remodel the existing house, encasing it in limestone and renaming it "Hillman House". The home stayed in the family until 1975.

== Personal life ==
Hillman was married to Juliet Cummins Lea (1885–1940), then subsequently married Dora Butcher. Hillman died in 1959.

=== Children ===
His son John Hartwell Hillman III was in the Princeton University class of 1932 and was president of the National Garden Supply Corporation. He died on March 21, 1974, of heart failure at his Pittsburgh home.

His son Henry Lea Hillman (1918–2017) was a billionaire investor.
