= Kecksburg =

Kecksburg may refer to:

- Kecksburg, Pennsylvania, United States
- Kecksburg UFO incident, a purported Unidentified Flying Object incident in 1965 near Kecksburg in Western Pennsylvania
