= Naomi, Pennsylvania =

Unincorporated community in Pennsylvania, US

- Census-designated place
- Location within Pennsylvania Location within the United States
- Coordinates: 40°6′38″N 79°50′36″W
- Country: United States
- State: Pennsylvania
- County: Fayette
- Township: Washington

Area
  - Total: 0.29 sq mi (0.75 km^{2})
  - Land: 0.17 sq mi (0.43 km^{2})
  - Water: 0.12 sq mi (0.32 km^{2})
- Elevation: 780 ft (240 m)

Population (2020)
  - Total: 53
  - Density: 322.1/sq mi (124.35/km^{2})
- Time zone: UTC-5 (Eastern (EST))
  - Summer (DST): UTC-4 (EDT)
- FIPS code: 42-52632
- GNIS feature ID: 1182160

Naomi is an unincorporated community and census-designated place (CDP) in Washington Township, Fayette County, Pennsylvania, United States. As of the 2010 census, the population was 69.

It is located in far northwestern Fayette County and is bordered by Fairhope to the east, Fayette City to the south, and Lynnwood to the north. The western border is the Monongahela River, which forms the Washington County line. Pennsylvania Routes 201 and 906 intersect in Naomi.

== Demographics ==
Historical population
Census	Pop.	Note	%±
2020	53		—
U.S. Decennial Census
