= Barren Run (Jacobs Creek tributary) =

Stream in Pennsylvania, USA

Barren Run Tributary to Jacobs Creek
- Location of Barren Run mouth Barren Run (Jacobs Creek tributary) (the United States)

Location
- Country: United States
- State: Pennsylvania
- County: Westmoreland

Physical characteristics
- Source: Lick Run divide
  - location: about 0.5 miles west-northwest of Mendon, Pennsylvania
  - coordinates: 40°11′00″N 079°27′02″W
  - elevation: 1,160 ft (350 m)
- Mouth: Jacobs Creek
  - location: about 0.5 miles southeast of Jacobs Creek, Pennsylvania
  - coordinates: 40°07′16″N 079°43′20″W
  - elevation: 815 ft (248 m)
- Length: 5.63 mi (9.06 km)
- Basin size: 10.49 square miles (27.2 km^{2})
- Discharge
  - location: Jacobs Creek
  - average: 13.59 cu ft/s (0.385 m^{3}/s) at mouth with Jacobs Creek

Basin features
- Progression: southwest
- River system: Monongahela River
- Tributaries
  - left: unnamed tributaries
  - right: unnamed tributaries
- Bridges: Mendon Road, Charlies Road, Mendon Road, PA 981, JD Smith Road, Mt. Etna Road

Barren Run is a 5.63 mi (9.06 km) long 2nd order tributary to Jacobs Creek in Westmoreland County, Pennsylvania.

== Variant names ==
According to the Geographic Names Information System, it has also been known historically as:

- Barnes Run

== Course ==
Barren Run rises about 0.5 miles west-northwest of Mendon, Pennsylvania, and then flows southwest to join Jacobs Creek about 0.5 miles southeast of Jacobs Creek.

== Watershed ==
Barren Run drains 10.49 square miles (27.2 km^{2}) of area, receives about 41.4 in/year of precipitation, has a wetness index of 340.38, and is about 58% forested.
