= Locus 7 Site =

- U.S. National Register of Historic Places
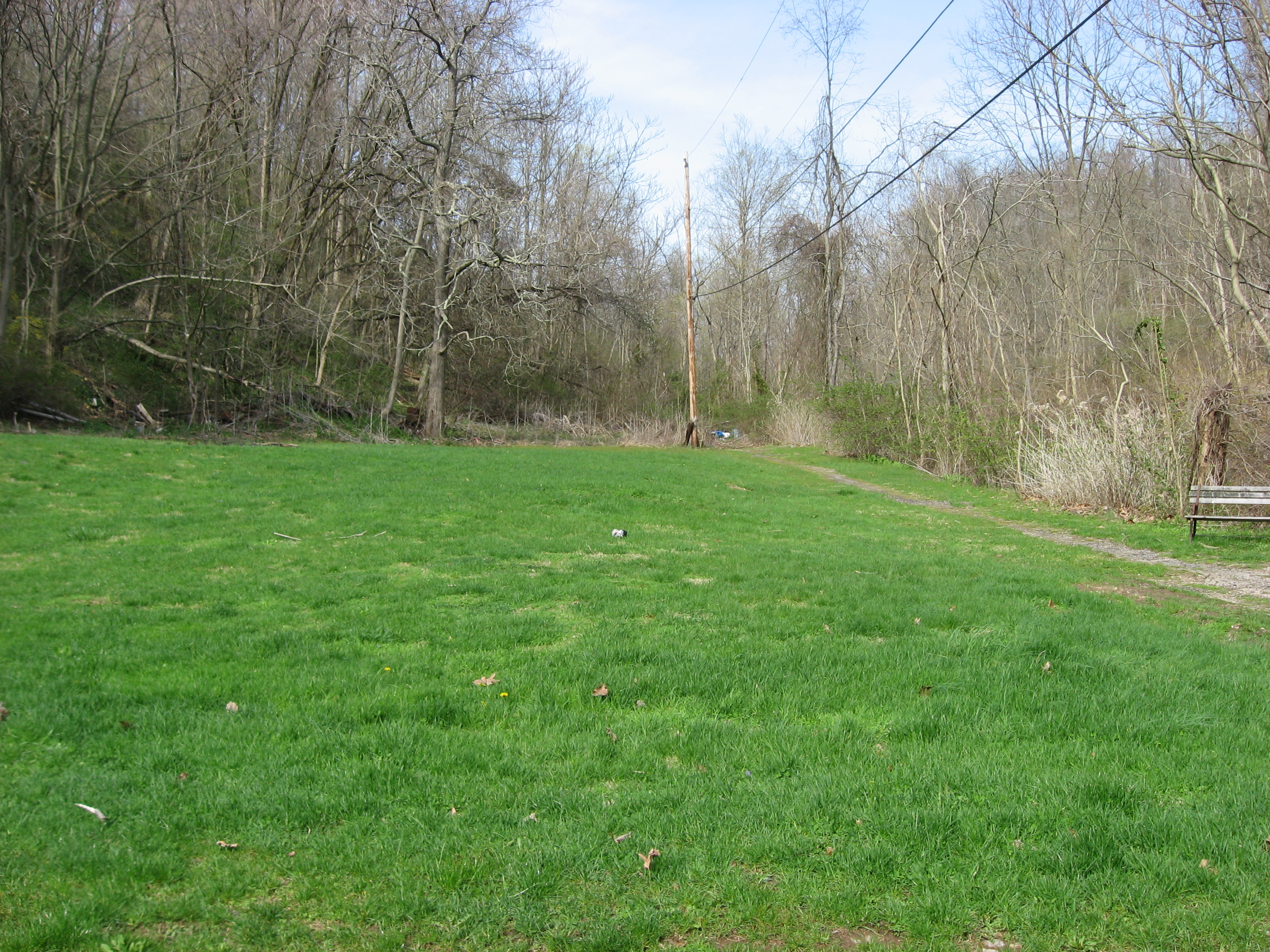
- Overview of the site

- Location within Pennsylvania Location within the United States
- Location: North of Fayette City, Pennsylvania
- Coordinates: 40°6′23.88″N 79°50′12.9″W
- Area: 2.9 acres (1.2 ha)
- NRHP reference No.: 80003495
- Added to NRHP: March 20, 1980

The Locus 7 Site is an archaeological site in Washington Township, Fayette County, Pennsylvania, United States. Located north of Fayette City, the site lies on a bluff over Downers Run about 2,000 feet (610 m) from the Monongahela River. It is believed to be the location of a former Monongahela village, but its date is uncertain; the village may have existed at any time between 900 and 1600. Its location on a bluff is unusual for Monongahela village sites, but this may have contributed to its preservation; most riverside Monongahela sites in the valley of the Monongahela River have been destroyed by development.

Small-scale archaeological investigation at the site has revealed a wide range of pottery at the site, along with a significant amount of mussel shells; it is believed that a more extensive excavation would yield evidence of small round houses and a stockade. Such a large amount of potential findings has been theorized because of the limited disturbance that the site has seen: unlike most Monongahela sites in the region, it has been damaged only by surface cultivation by local farmers who used only horse-powered equipment.

Locus 7's archaeological significance was recognized in 1980 when it was listed on the National Register of Historic Places.

== See also ==
- List of Native American archaeological sites on the National Register of Historic Places in Pennsylvania

== Notes ==
a: While the source for this statement gives the name as "Douners Run," the United States Geological Survey has recorded the stream's name as given in the text.
b: While the source for this statement states that the site lies west of the river, this is impossible, as the land west of the river is part of Washington County.
40°6′24″N 79°50′13″W
