= Lochiel =

Lochiel may refer to:

== Places ==
=== Scotland ===
- Loch Eil, a sea loch in the home area of Clan Cameron, sometimes referred to as Lochiel
- Lochiel, Scotland, a historic place on Loch Eil that was home to Donald Cameron of Lochiel, the 19th Lochiel

=== United States ===
- Lochiel, Arizona, a ghost town in southern Santa Cruz County
- Lochiel, Pennsylvania
- Lochiel, Wisconsin, the original name of Wheeler

=== Elsewhere ===
- Lochiel, South Australia
- Lochiel, Mpumalanga, South Africa

== Other uses ==
- Lochiel (Clan Cameron chief), any of the Clan Cameron leaders, in Scotland
- MV Lochiel (1939), a MacBrayne mail steamer employed on the route to Islay from the 1930s to the 1970s.

== See also ==
- Lochiel Park, an historic house and park in the City of Campbelltown, South Australia
