= Shupe Run =

Stream in Pennsylvania, USA

Shupe Run Tributary to Jacobs Creek
- Location of Shupe Run mouth Shupe Run (the United States)

Location
- Country: United States
- State: Pennsylvania
- County: Westmoreland
- Borough: Mount Pleasant

Physical characteristics
- Source: Sherrick Run divide
  - location: about 0.25 miles north of Mount Pleasant, Pennsylvania
  - coordinates: 40°10′07″N 079°32′02″W
  - elevation: 1,120 ft (340 m)
- Mouth: Jacobs Creek
  - location: Buckeye, Pennsylvania
  - coordinates: 40°07′30″N 079°32′11″W
  - elevation: 1,037 ft (316 m)
- Length: 3.08 mi (4.96 km)
- Basin size: 4.05 square miles (10.5 km^{2})
- Discharge
  - location: Jacobs Creek
  - average: 5.89 cu ft/s (0.167 m^{3}/s) at mouth with Jacobs Creek

Basin features
- Progression: south
- River system: Monongahela River
- Tributaries
  - left: unnamed tributaries
  - right: unnamed tributaries
- Bridges: Royal State Street, Castle Lane, State Street, Slope Hill Road, E Main Street, Cooks Way

Shupe Run is a 3.08 mi (4.96 km) long 2nd order tributary to Jacobs Creek in Westmoreland County, Pennsylvania.

== Course ==
Shupe Run rises about 0.25 miles north of Mount Pleasant, Pennsylvania, and then flows south to join Jacobs Creek at Buckeye.

== Watershed ==
Shupe Run drains 4.05 square miles (10.5 km^{2}) of area, receives about 42.5 in/year of precipitation, has a wetness index of 415.01, and is about 20% forested.
