= J. Hartwell Hillman Sr. =

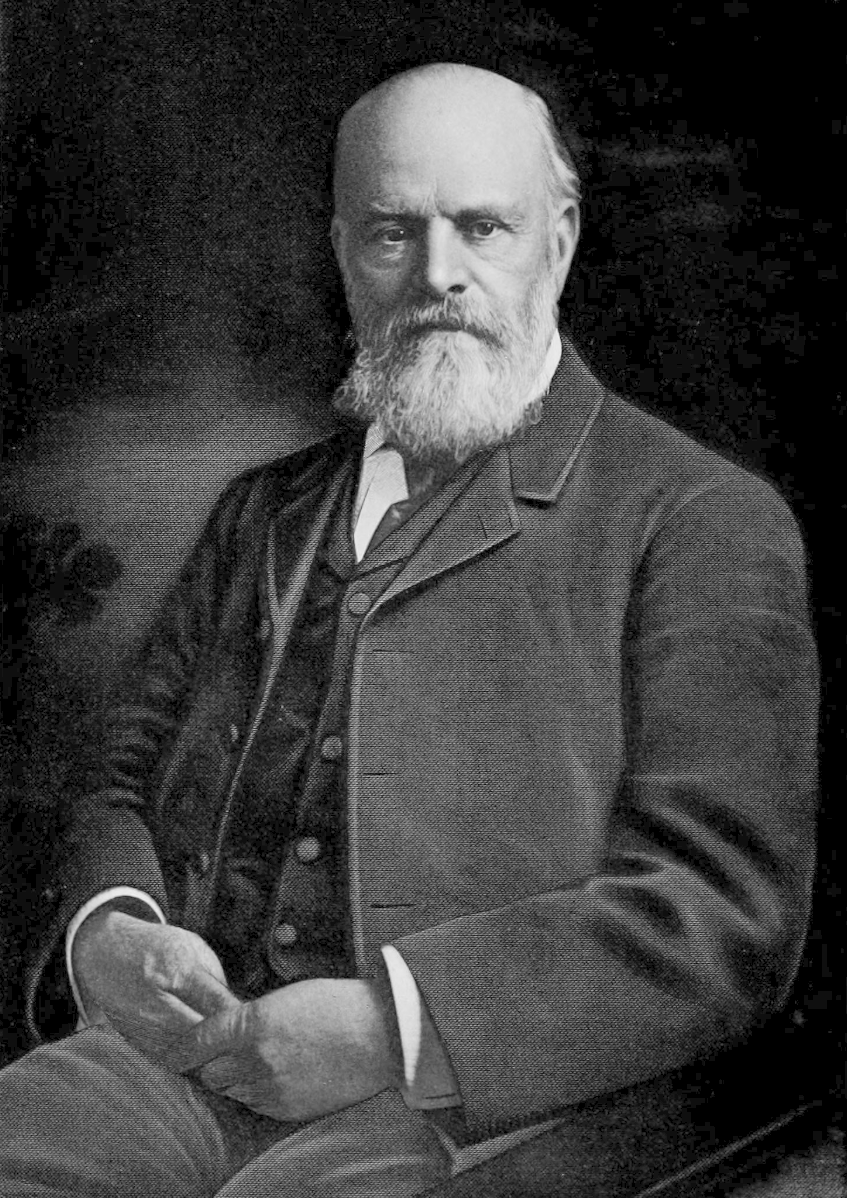
- Born: John Hartwell Hillman; September 27, 1841; Montgomery County, Tennessee
- Died: October 10, 1911 (aged 70); Pittsburgh, Pennsylvania
- Occupation: Businessman
- Spouse: Sallie Murfree Frazer (m. 1869)
- Children: 3, including J. Hartwell Hillman Jr.

Signature
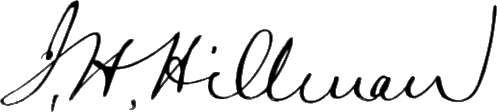

John Hartwell Hillman Sr. (1841–1911) was an American businessman and the founder of the Hillman Coal and Coke Company.

== Early life ==
He was born in Montgomery County, Tennessee on September 27, 1841, the eldest son of Daniel C. Hillman (1807–1885) and his first wife, Ann Jones Marable.

== Career ==
He started his career in Nashville, Tennessee, before moving to Pittsburgh in the mid-1880s, where he "became one of the financial and industrial leaders".

He established the Hillman Coal and Coke Company, and J. H. Hillman & Sons, which was eventually run by his three sons. Hillman Coal and Coke Company later became Pittsburgh Coke & Chemical, and it is now Calgon Carbon.

== Personal life ==
He married Sallie Murfree Frazer on June 2, 1869, and they had three sons:

- John Hartwell Hillman Jr. (1880–1959)
- Ernest Hillman (1883–1969), retired from Hillman Coal and Coke Company in 1945, then active in politics
- James Frazier Hillman (1888–1972)

J. Hartwell Hillman Sr. died at his home in Pittsburgh on October 10, 1911.
