= Jacobs Creek (Youghiogheny River tributary) =

River in southwestern Pennsylvania, United States

Jacobs Creek Tributary to Youghiogheny River
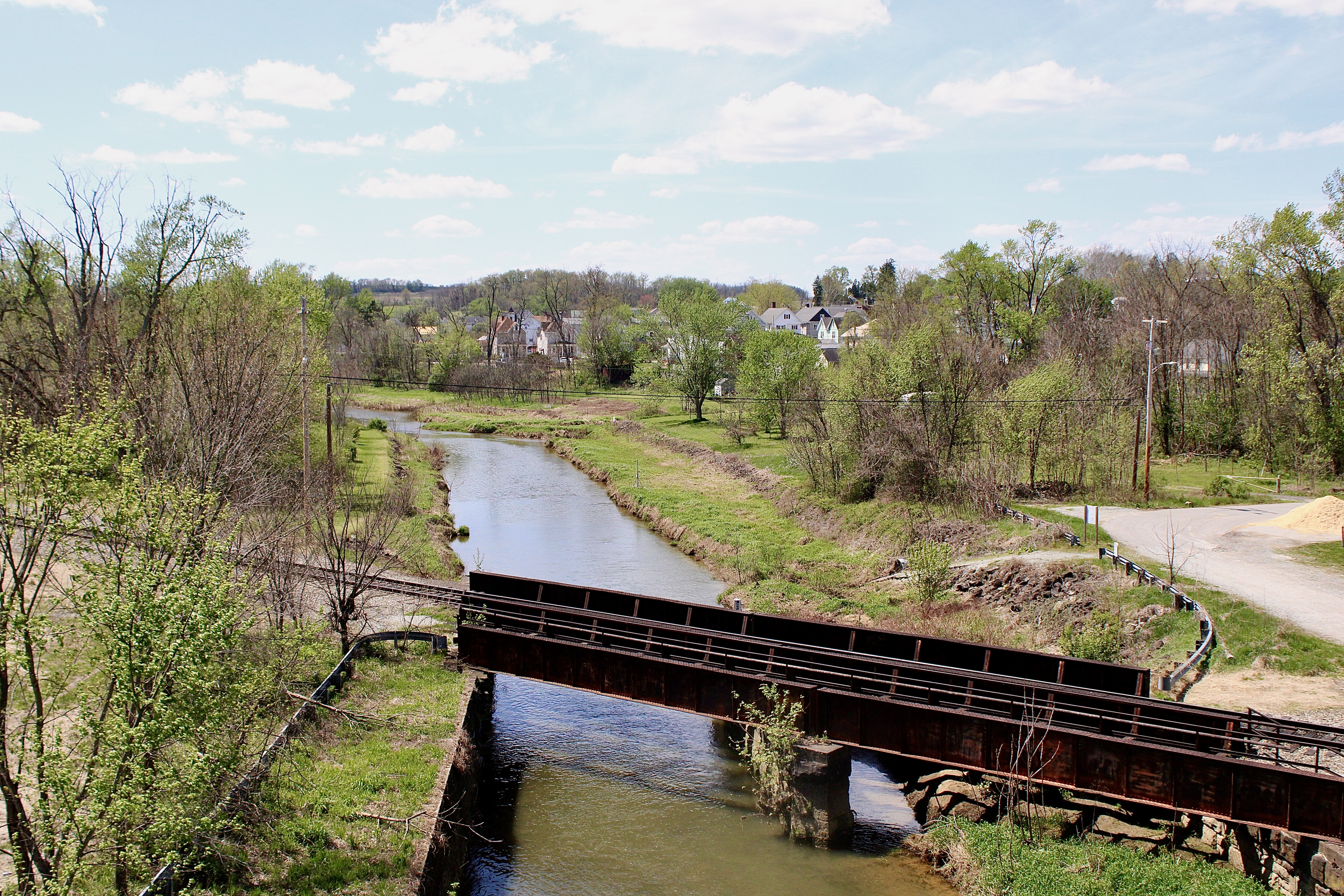
- Jacob's Creek seen from Everson, Pennsylvania

- Location of Jacobs Creek mouth Jacobs Creek (Youghiogheny River tributary) (the United States)

Location
- Country: United States
- State: Pennsylvania
- Counties: Westmoreland, PA, Fayette, PA
- Cities: Scottdale, PA, Mt. Pleasant, PA

Physical characteristics
- Source: Green Lick Run divide
  - location: about 1 mile south Bear Rocks, Pennsylvania
  - coordinates: 40°05′58″N 079°27′02″W
  - elevation: 2,070 ft (630 m)
- Mouth: Youghiogheny River
  - location: Jacobs Creek, Westmoreland County, PA
  - coordinates: 40°07′37″N 79°44′35″W
  - elevation: 761 ft (232 m)
- Length: 31.73 mi (51.06 km)
- Basin size: 94.81 square miles (245.6 km^{2})
- Discharge
  - location: Youghiogheny River
  - average: 133.11 cu ft/s (3.769 m^{3}/s) at mouth with Youghiogheny River

Basin features
- Progression: generally east
- River system: Monongahela River
- Tributaries
  - left: Latta Run
  - right: Laurel Run; Brush Run; Shupe Run; Sherrick Run; Stauffer Run; Meadow Run; Barren Run
- Waterbodies: Bridgeport Reservoir

Jacobs Creek is a 33.4-mile-long (53.8 km) tributary of the Youghiogheny River beginning in Acme, Pennsylvania and draining at its mouth in the town of Jacobs Creek into the Youghiogheny River. Jacobs Creek is the southwestern border of Westmoreland County and the northwestern border of Fayette County. The area was a major producer of rye whiskey in the decades before Prohibition.

== Variant names ==
According to the Geographic Names Information System, it has also been known historically as:

- Jacob's Creek

== Geography ==
Jacobs Creek, between Chaintown and its mouth, cuts a deep gorge through the Fayette Anticline, exposing many rock outcroppings and even exposures of the Freeport Coal seam.

The geography of Jacobs Creek allowed early civilization in the Jacobs Creek Valley as early as 1768 when western Pennsylvania was opened to settlement by the Treaty of Fort Stanwix. According to Rambling in the Valley of Jacobs Creek (Medsger & Rowe):

Various industrial enterprises have been associated with the history of this valley. Among the first were the manufacture of salt and iron. By the treaty of Fort Stanwix in 1768 this region was opened for settlement and many people from the eastern part of the state were locating in this "land of promise". Both salt and iron were in demand, they were expensive and hard to procure, hence men of enterprise naturally sought means to supply these demands. George Dallas Albert in his "History of Westmoreland County", says that, "Foremost of the wants of these early settlers was the want of salt." He also states that "in the Youghiogheny region, twenty bushels of wheat was not thought an unfair exchange for a bushel of salt; or a cow and calf for a similar amount."

Other geographic features of the valley include two waterfalls: Freeman Falls and Creek Falls.

== History ==
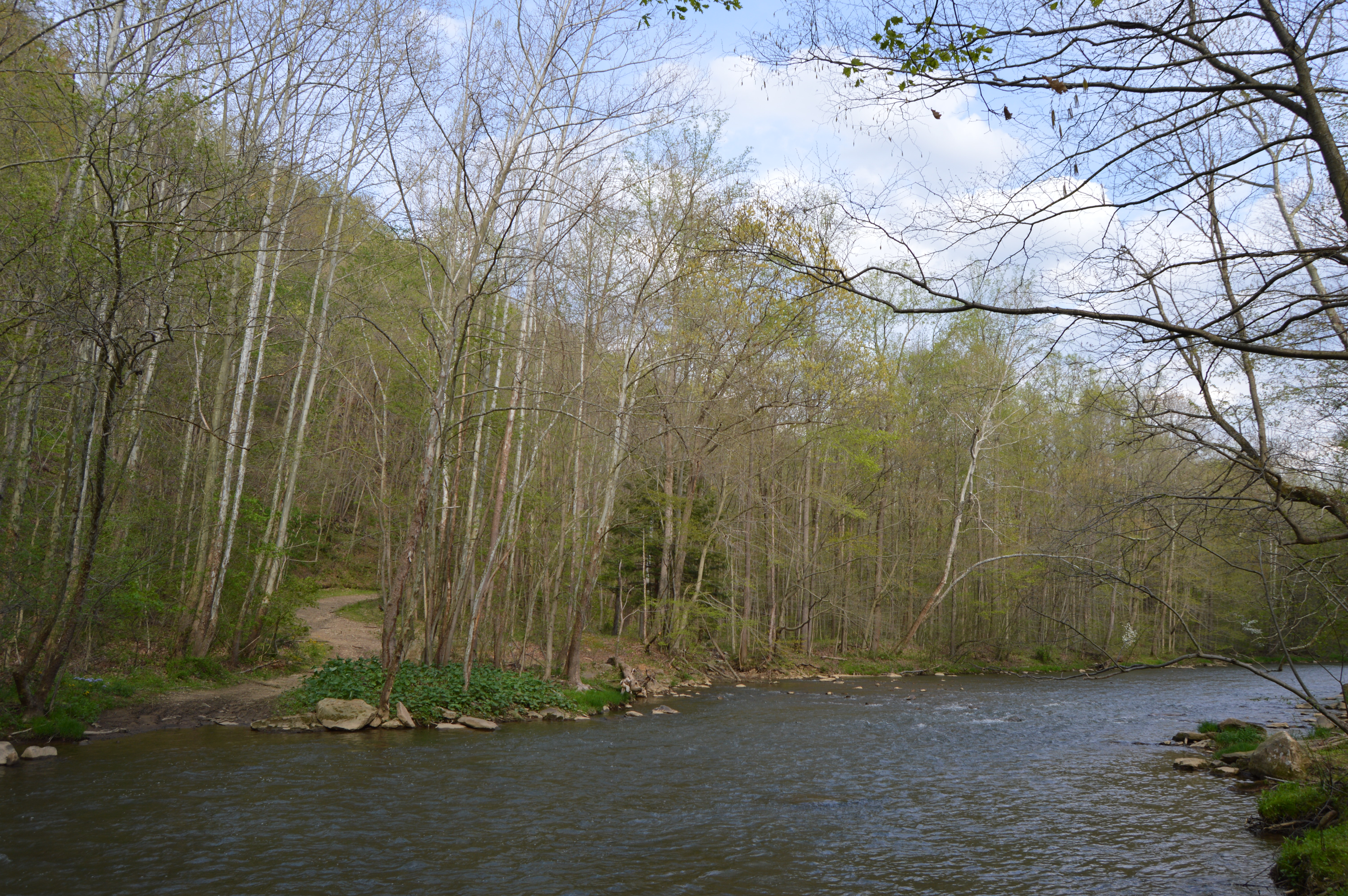
Upstream from Alliance Furnace

Jacobs Creek was named for Chief Jacob, a Native American. The valley of Jacobs Creek is home to an abundance of colonial and industrial history, including the home of the Alliance Furnace, the oldest standing iron furnace west of the Appalachian Mountains. The Alliance Furnace was built before ownership of the land was obtained by William Turnbull, John Holker, and Peter Marmie on July 13, 1789. The furnace was blown in 1802.

Starting in the 1790s, Jacobs Creek attracted a number of Mennonite farmers. One of those Mennonites was Henry Oberholtzer (anglicized to "Overholt"). In 1803, the Overholts established a farm that grew into West Overton, an early company town that included a rye whiskey distillery, gristmill, cooperage, coverlet factory, and a coal and coke works. Henry began distilling rye whiskey as a side business to the farm, which his son, Abraham Overholt, transformed into an industrial enterprise. Their whiskey later became known as Old Overholt. Western Pennsylvania was a major producer of rye whiskey in the decades before Prohibition.

Other sources of industry along the valley include salt mills, grist mills, coke ovens, strip mining, and iron ore mining.

On December 19, 1907, an explosion in the Darr Coal Mine killed 239 men and boys.

== Recreation ==
Recreation along Jacobs Creek includes smallmouth bass and trout fishing, seasonal whitewater kayaking, and swimming. It has been the inspiration of the guide Ramblings in the Valley of Jacobs Creek.

=== Kayaking ===
- Acme to Laurelville (Class III-IV)
- Chaintown to Youghiogheny River (Class II-III)
- Freeman Falls (Class IV)
- Creek Falls (Class V Backwards U-Type Waterfall)

== See also ==
- List of rivers of Pennsylvania
- Jacob's Creek Bridge (1801). The first iron-chain suspension bridge built in the United States.
