= Darr Mine disaster =

1907 mining accident in Pennsylvania

Coordinates: 40.128°N 79.750°W

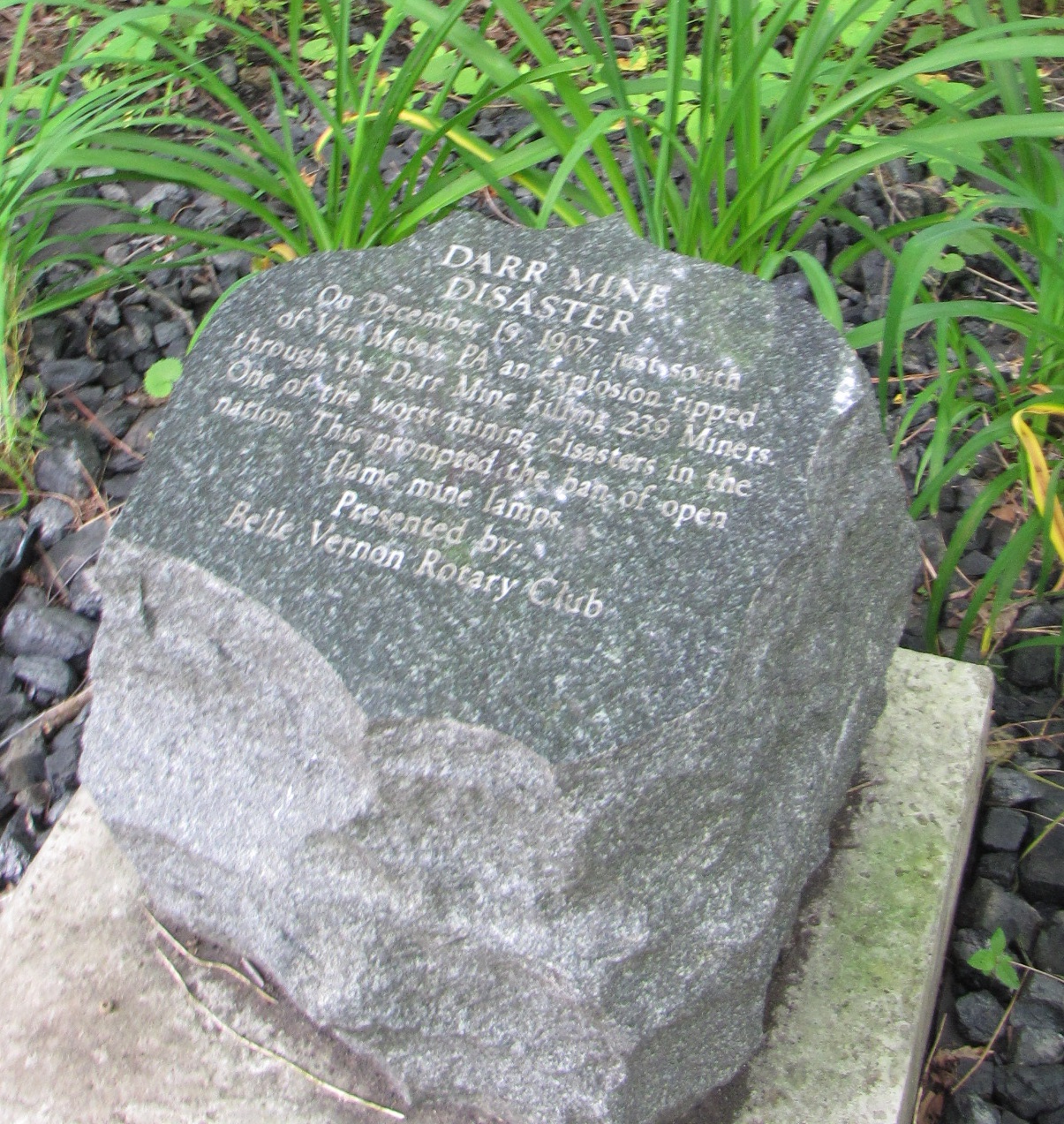
Memorial to the Darr Mine disaster

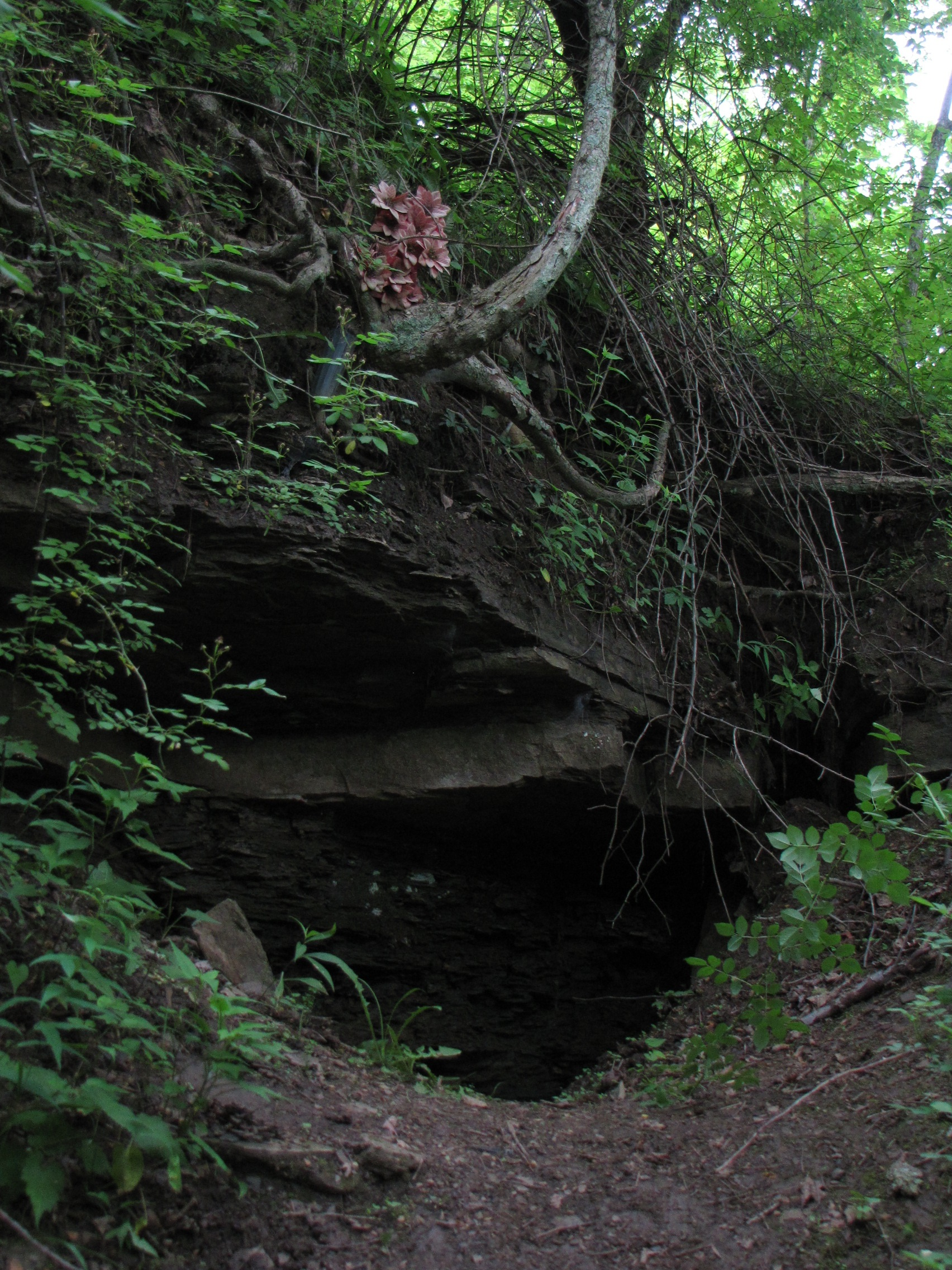
Entrance of the Darr Mine, now covered in forest; photographed June 2011

The Darr Mine disaster at Van Meter, Rostraver Township, Westmoreland County, Pennsylvania, near Smithton, killed 239 men and boys on December 19, 1907. It ranks as the worst coal mining disaster in Pennsylvanian history. Many victims were of immigrants from central Europe, including Rusyns, Hungarians (including Slovaks from Gemer and Abov - then part of Austria-Hungary), Austrians, Germans, Poles and Italians.

The mine was operated by the Pittsburgh Coal Company. It was located on the west side of the Youghiogheny River and along the route of the Pittsburgh and Lake Erie Railroad. Most of the miners and other mine laborers lived in the nearby community of Jacobs Creek and took a "sky ferry" (aerial tramway) across the Youghiogheny River to the mine entrance. Others lived in nearby Van Meter.

An inquiry carried out after the disaster determined that the blast was the result of miners carrying open lamps in an area cordoned off the previous day by the fire boss. The mine’s owner, the Pittsburgh Coal Company was not held responsible, but did abandon the use of open lamps after the disaster.

The Darr Mine blast was the third major mine disaster in December 1907 (which would become the deadliest mine fatality month in US history); it followed the explosion of the Yolande mine in Alabama, on December 16, the Monongah Mining disaster in West Virginia on December 6 that killed 362 miners and the Naomi Mine explosion on December 1 that killed thirty-four people in Fayette City, Pennsylvania.
