= Brush Run (Jacobs Creek tributary) =

Stream in Pennsylvania, USA

Brush Run Tributary to Jacobs Creek
- Location of Brush Run mouth Brush Run (Jacobs Creek tributary) (the United States)

Location
- Country: United States
- State: Pennsylvania
- County: Westmoreland

Physical characteristics
- Source: Laurel Run divide
  - location: about 1 mile east of Kecksburg, Pennsylvania
  - coordinates: 40°10′12″N 079°33′47″W
  - elevation: 1,465 ft (447 m)
- Mouth: Jacobs Creek
  - location: about 0.5 miles southeast of Mount Pleasant, Pennsylvania
  - coordinates: 40°06′45″N 079°33′47″W
  - elevation: 1,055 ft (322 m)
- Length: 6.99 mi (11.25 km)
- Basin size: 8.59 square miles (22.2 km^{2})
- Discharge
  - location: Jacobs Creek
  - average: 13.00 cu ft/s (0.368 m^{3}/s) at mouth with Jacobs Creek

Basin features
- Progression: southwest
- River system: Monongahela River
- Tributaries
  - left: unnamed tributaries
  - right: unnamed tributaries
- Bridges: PA 982, Kecksburg Road, Hutter Farm Road, Bair Hill Road, Moccasin Hollow Road, Brush Creek Road, I-70, Carpentertown Mine Road, Pole Cat Road, PA 31

Brush Run is a 6.99 mi (11.25 km) long 2nd order tributary to Jacobs Creek in Westmoreland County, Pennsylvania.

== Variant names ==
According to the Geographic Names Information System, it has also been known historically as:

- Brush Creek
- Laurel Run

== Course ==
Brush Run rises about 1 mile east of Kecksburg, Pennsylvania, and then flows southwest to join Jacobs Creek about 0.5 miles southeast of Mount Pleasant.

== Watershed ==
Brush Run drains 8.59 square miles (22.2 km^{2}) of area, receives about 43.4 in/year of precipitation, has a wetness index of 403.86, and is about 36% forested.
