= Calgon =

American brand of bath and beauty products

- Product type: Bath and beauty
- Current owner: PDC Brands
- Country: United States
- Introduced: 1930; 96 years ago
- Previous owners: Calgon, Inc. Merck & Co.
- Website: takemeaway.com

Calgon is an American brand of bath and beauty products, owned by PDC Brands.

== Early history ==
The original product consisted of powdered sodium hexametaphosphate (amorphous sodium polyphosphate), which, in water, would complex with ambient calcium ions and certain other cations—preventing formation of unwanted salts and interference by those cations with the actions of soap or other detergents. The name was a portmanteau derived from the phrase "calcium gone". Originally promoted for general use in bathing and cleaning, it gave rise to derivative products, which have diverged from the original composition. Today, Calgon water softener contains the active ingredient sodium citrate, and the now discontinued powder used zeolite and polycarboxylate, all of which are less problematic in wastewater treatment than phosphates.

== Companies ==
The brand has its origin in Calgon, Inc. of Pittsburgh, Pennsylvania, which first put Calgon water softener on the market in 1933.

In 1965, Calgon was separated into:

- Calgon bath and beauty products, sold to Coty, and then acquired by Ascendia Brands on 9 February 2007. Ilex Capital of Annapolis, Maryland purchased the product line and the rights to the name for $4.2 million in 2008. The brand's operations became part of Ilex Consumer Products Group LLC. In 2013, private equity firm Yellow Wood acquired Ilex Consumer Products Group; Calgon is now part of their portfolio company, PDC Brands.
- Calgon Carbon Corporation, acquired by its management in a leveraged buyout in 1985 and taken public in 1987.
- Calgon Water Management, sold to English China Clays in June 1993 for $307.5 million.
- Calgon Vestal Laboratories, sold to Bristol-Myers Squibb in November 1994 for $261.5 million and then to the Steris Corporation in 1996.
