= Stauffer Run (Jacobs Creek tributary) =

Stream in Pennsylvania, USA

Stauffer Run Tributary to Jacobs Creek
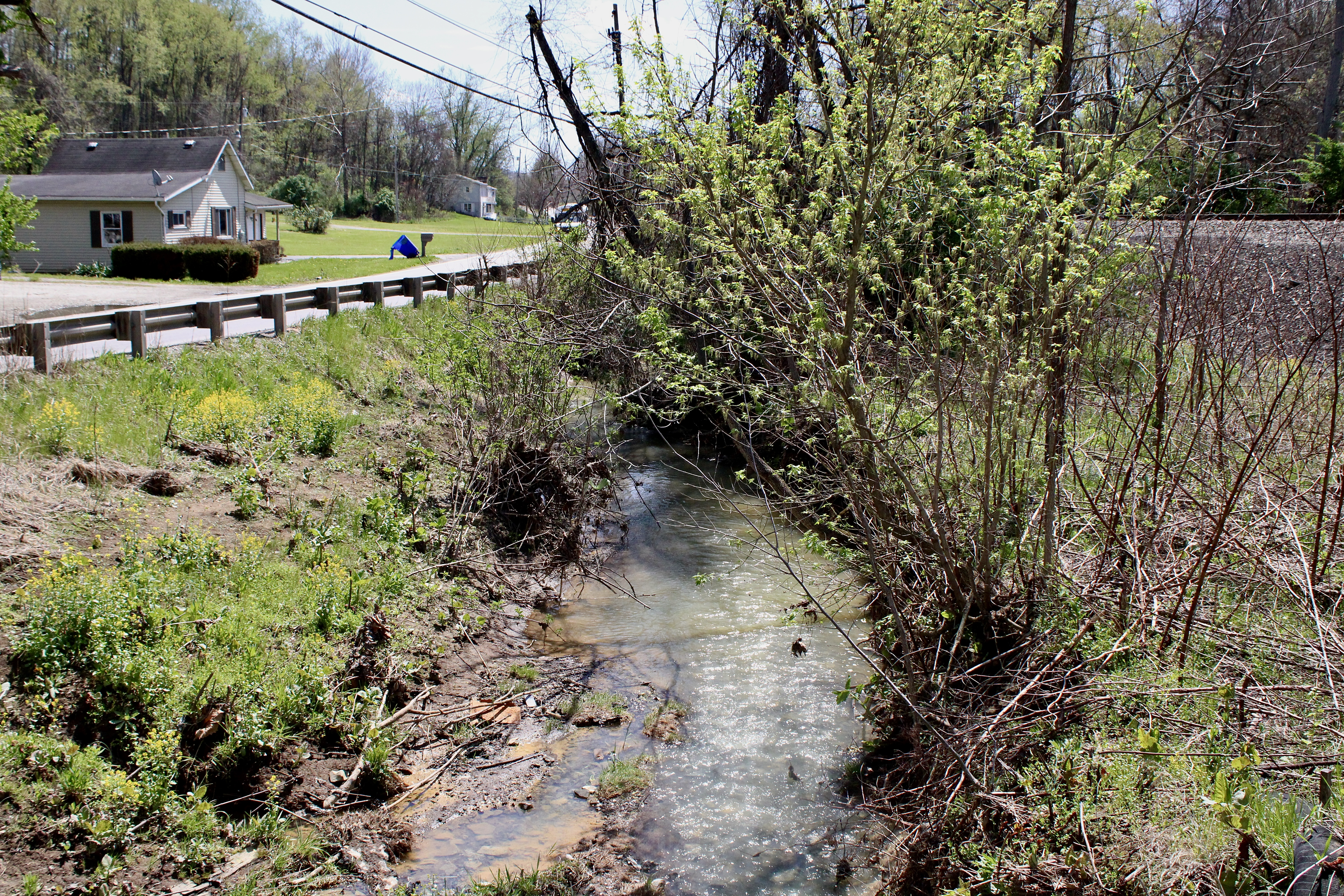
- Stauffer Run near Alverton, Pennsylvania

- Location of Stauffer Run mouth Stauffer Run (Jacobs Creek tributary) (the United States)

Location
- Country: United States
- State: Pennsylvania
- County: Westmoreland
- Borough: Scottdale

Physical characteristics
- Source: Buffalo Run divide
  - location: about 0.5 miles southwest of West Bethany, Pennsylvania
  - coordinates: 40°09′16″N 079°36′24″W
  - elevation: 1,200 ft (370 m)
- Mouth: Jacobs Creek
  - location: Scottdale, Pennsylvania
  - coordinates: 40°06′11″N 079°36′24″W
  - elevation: 1,021 ft (311 m)
- Length: 3.98 mi (6.41 km)
- Basin size: 5.08 square miles (13.2 km^{2})
- Discharge
  - location: Jacobs Creek
  - average: 7.14 cu ft/s (0.202 m^{3}/s) at mouth with Jacobs Creek

Basin features
- Progression: south
- River system: Monongahela River
- Tributaries
  - left: unnamed tributaries
  - right: unnamed tributaries
- Bridges: Adams-Bowser Road, Ottenberg Road, PA 981, Mt. Nebo Church Road, Pine Lane, Hawkeye Road, Onyx Street, Porter Avenue, Mt. Pleasant Road

Stauffer Run is a 3.98 mi (6.41 km) long 2nd order tributary to Jacobs Creek in Westmoreland County, Pennsylvania.

== Course ==
Stauffer Run rises about 0.5 miles southwest of West Bethany, Pennsylvania, and then flows south to join Jacobs Creek at Scottdale.

== Watershed ==
Stauffer Run drains 5.08 square miles (13.2 km^{2}) of area, receives about 42.1 in/year of precipitation, has a wetness index of 377.03, and is about 27% forested.
