= Washington Township, Fayette County, Pennsylvania =

Township in Pennsylvania, US

Coordinates: 40°07′36″N 79°51′29″W

Washington Township
- Township
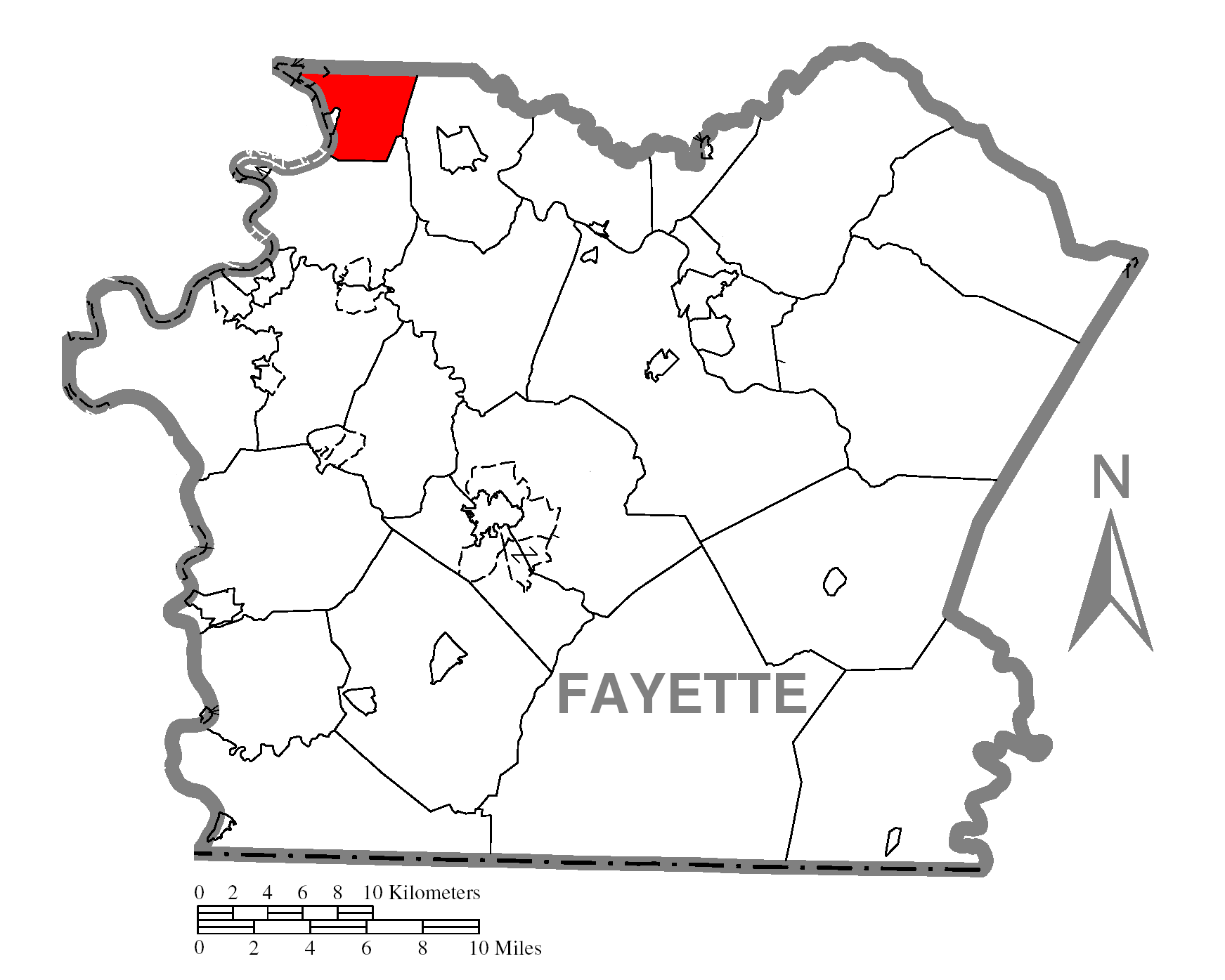
- Location of Washington Township in Fayette County

- Location of Fayette County in Pennsylvania
- Country: United States
- State: Pennsylvania
- County: Fayette

Area
  - Total: 9.88 sq mi (25.59 km^{2})
  - Land: 9.71 sq mi (25.14 km^{2})
  - Water: 0.18 sq mi (0.46 km^{2})

Population (2020)
  - Total: 3,899 ▼
  - Estimate (2022): 3,784
  - Density: 385.3/sq mi (148.75/km^{2})
- Time zone: UTC-4 (EST)
  - Summer (DST): UTC-5 (EDT)
- Area code: 724
- FIPS code: 42-051-81232
- Website: Official website

Washington Township is a township in Fayette County, Pennsylvania, United States. The population was 3,899 at the 2020 census, down from 3,902 at the 2010 census.

Arnold City, Fairhope, Lynnwood, Gillespie, Naomi and Brownstown are communities in the township.

== History ==
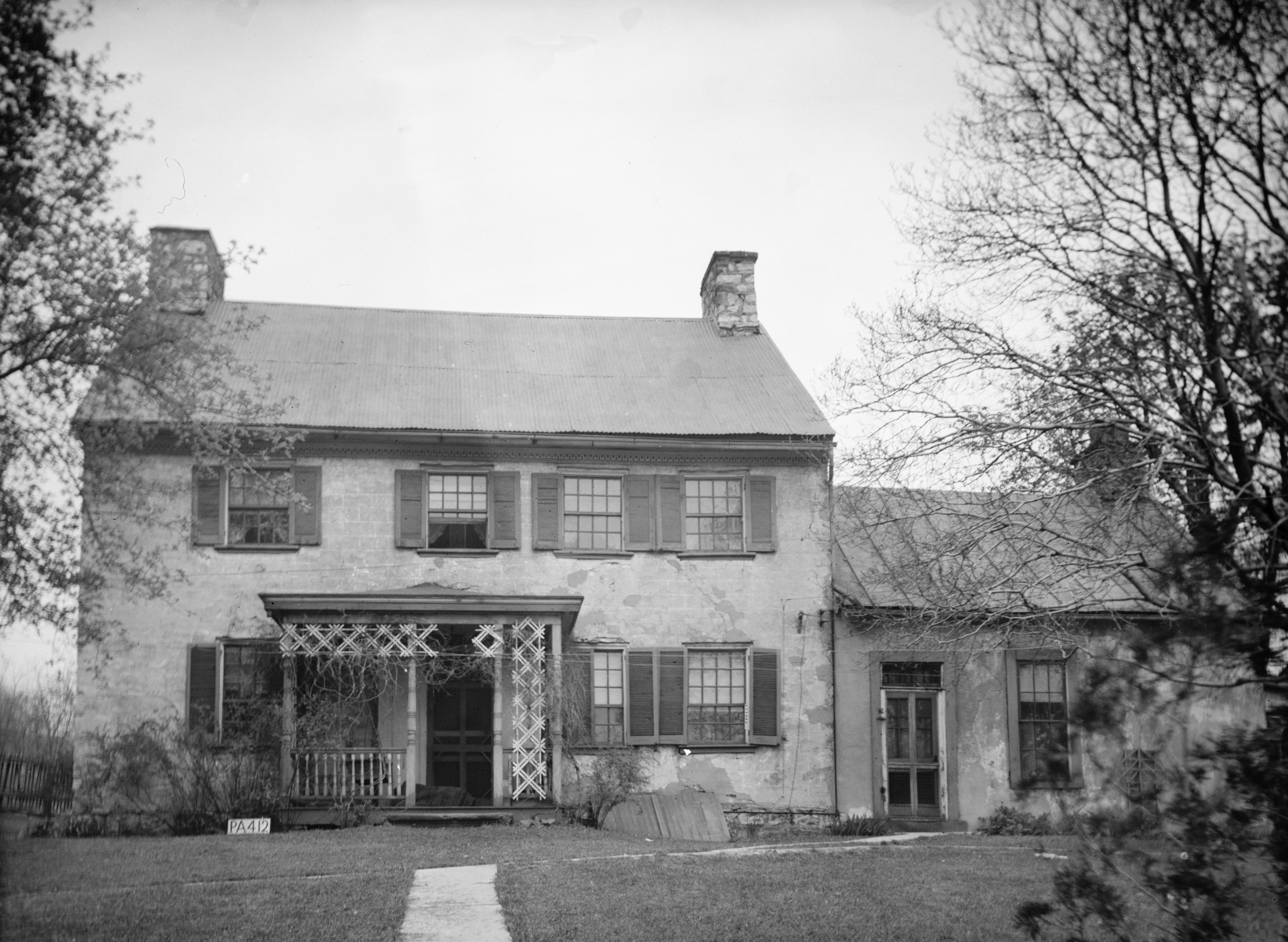
Edward Cook's house

A significant part of the prehistory of Washington Township is the Locus 7 Site, located north of Fayette City, where it is believed that members of the Monongahela tribe may have lived as far back as AD 600. Washington Township is an original Fayette County township, created from Rostraver Township when Fayette County was erected from Westmoreland County in 1783. It originally included Perry and Jefferson townships.

Washington Township's most prominent historical figure is Colonel Edward Cook. Settling in what was then Westmoreland County, he was granted 3,000 acres (1,200 ha) and first built a small log cabin and a small store. In 1772, he began building his home (still standing today), the first stone building west of the Allegheny Mountains. Built entirely out of limestone from his property, it was finished in 1776.

Colonel Cook was among General Washington's personal friends and on two occasions at least entertained Washington in the old stone mansion. A local legend claims that on one of the occasions, Washington was journeying that way to visit his lands in Washington County and stopped at Col. Cook's for a brief rest. Cook was at that time engaged in reviewing a body of militia nearby and knew nothing of the arrival of his distinguished guest. Word of the arrival was whispered to the men before it reached the colonel, and when he observing the commotion learned what was in the wind, he relaxed all discipline and set off unceremoniously for the house. The militiamen followed at the double-quick and hurrahing enthusiastically for General Washington brought him to the porch and evoked from him in reply a good natured and fatherly speech which the soldiers cheered to the echo. There is no documented evidence, however, that this event occurred.

After 1770, Washington visited southwestern Pennsylvania one last time, in September 1784. Washington kept an account of the journey that provides details of where he stopped each day, whom he met with and what they talked about, in addition to specifically where he went, what he saw, and did. Each and every stop along the way is mentioned. In one passage he mentions traveling through or across Cook's land, but he makes no mention of stopping to talk to Cook or that he even saw him at any time during the 1784 journey. The second mention of Cook, later in his diary, mentions Cook had a large house, and again, nothing about stopping there, speaking to Cook, or there being a militia group present at any time during his time in SW Pennsylvania. Cook and Washington may have known each other however they shared very different viewpoints about the Virginia-Pennsylvania rivalry and counter claims over whether the region belonged to Virginia or Pennsylvania, and would have been rivals in the land acquisition and speculation business.

Cook was a member of the Provincial Congress convened in Carpenter's Hall, Philadelphia, June 18, 1776, that drafted the first declaration of independence presented to Congress, June 25, 1776 (see "Journal of Congress, vol. ii, p. 230); was a member of the State Constitutional Convention that convened September 28, 1776; and was the first commissioner of exchange and appointed sub-lieutenant of Westmoreland County, March 21, 1777.

On January 5, 1782, he was appointed lieutenant of Westmoreland County to succeed Col. Archibald Lochry, who had been captured and killed while on an Indian expedition. This office gave him command of the militia of the county and the management of its military fiscal affairs. It was from this appointment that Col. Cook received his military title.

He aided in fixing the boundaries of Fayette County and was a member of the commission that located the county seat. On November 21, 1786, he was appointed justice of the peace with a jurisdiction that reached into Washington County. On April 8, 1789, he was appointed president of the Court of Common Pleas and Quarter Session. He was associate judge of Fayette County in 1791, and from 1796 to 1798 treasurer of Westmoreland County.

He was conspicuous in the Whiskey Insurrection and having been prominent in some of the meetings of the insurgents, his arrest was ordered. Before any action could be taken, however, he appeared on November 6, 1794, before Thomas McKean, chief justice of the Supreme Court of Pennsylvania, and in the presence of William Bradford, Attorney General of the United States, voluntarily entered into recognizance to the United States for his appearance before the justices of the Supreme Court of the United States at the next special session of the Circuit Court held for the district of Pennsylvania "then and there to answer such charges of treasonable and seditious practices and such other matters of misdemeanor as shall be alleged against him in behalf of the United States and that he will not depart that court without license."

Having taken this bold and honorable course, he quietly awaited the result which was simply that nothing was found against him and he was not molested in person but some cavalrymen belonging to the army that came out to quell the insurrection visited his home and did considerable damage, nearly demolishing his distillery, knocking in the heads of liquor casks and spilling a vast amount of whiskey.

The Col. Edward Cook House and the Locus 7 Site are listed on the National Register of Historic Places.

== Geography ==
Washington Township occupies the northwestern corner of Fayette County, bordered to the north by Westmoreland County and to the west, across the Monongahela River, by Washington County. The borough of Belle Vernon borders the township on the northwest, and the borough of Fayette City is on the west; both boroughs are situated along the Monongahela.

According to the United States Census Bureau, the township has a total area of 9.9 square miles (25.6 km^{2}), of which 9.7 square miles (25.1 km^{2}) is land and 0.2 square miles (0.5 km^{2}), or 1.78%, is water.

== Demographics ==
Historical population
Census	Pop.	Note	%±
1990	4,613		—
2000	4,461		−3.3%
2010	3,902		−12.5%
2020	3,899		−0.1%
2022 (est.)	3,784		−2.9%
U.S. Decennial Census

As of the 2000 census, there were 4,461 people, 1,821 households, and 1,285 families residing in the township. The population density was 465.6 inhabitants per square mile (179.8/km^{2}). There were 1,948 housing units at an average density of 203.3 per square mile (78.5/km^{2}). The racial makeup of the township was 97.96% White, 1.32% African American, 0.22% Native American, 0.18% Asian, 0.09% from other races, and 0.22% from two or more races. Hispanic or Latino of any race were 0.20% of the population.

There were 1,821 households, out of which 23.4% had children under the age of 18 living with them, 56.0% were married couples living together, 10.9% had a female householder with no husband present, and 29.4% were non-families. 27.5% of all households were made up of individuals, and 16.1% had someone living alone who was 65 years of age or older. The average household size was 2.34 and the average family size was 2.83.

In the township the population was spread out, with 18.2% under the age of 18, 6.2% from 18 to 24, 23.4% from 25 to 44, 25.8% from 45 to 64, and 26.3% who were 65 years of age or older. The median age was 46 years. For every 100 females, there were 87.8 males. For every 100 females age 18 and over, there were 86.6 males.

The median income for a household in the township was $29,697, and the median income for a family was $37,917. Males had a median income of $34,375 versus $22,250 for females. The per capita income for the township was $15,629. About 6.1% of families and 12.1% of the population were below the poverty line, including 20.3% of those under age 18 and 11.0% of those age 65 or over.
