= Meadow Run (Jacobs Creek tributary) =

Stream in Pennsylvania, USA

Meadow Run Tributary to Jacobs Creek
- Location of Meadow Run mouth Meadow Run (Jacobs Creek tributary) (the United States)

Location
- Country: United States
- State: Pennsylvania
- County: Westmoreland

Physical characteristics
- Source: Buffalo Run divide
  - location: about 1.5 miles southwest of Ruffsdale, Pennsylvania
  - coordinates: 40°09′47″N 079°37′46″W
  - elevation: 1,262 ft (385 m)
- Mouth: Jacobs Creek
  - location: about 0.75 miles west-northwest of Chaintown, Pennsylvania
  - coordinates: 40°06′17″N 079°40′04″W
  - elevation: 978 ft (298 m)
- Length: 5.24 mi (8.43 km)
- Basin size: 6.97 square miles (18.1 km^{2})
- Discharge
  - location: Jacobs Creek
  - average: 9.98 cu ft/s (0.283 m^{3}/s) at mouth with Jacobs Creek

Basin features
- Progression: southwest
- River system: Monongahela River
- Tributaries
  - left: unnamed tributaries
  - right: unnamed tributaries
- Bridges: PA 981, Wesley Chapel Road, Espey Road, Meadow Run Road

Meadow Run is a 5.24 mi (8.43 km) long 2nd order tributary to Jacobs Creek in Westmoreland County, Pennsylvania.

== Course ==
Meadow Run rises about 1.5 miles southwest of Ruffsdale, Pennsylvania, and then flows southwest to join Jacobs Creek about 0.75 miles west-northwest of Chaintown.

== Watershed ==
Meadow Run drains 6.97 square miles (18.1 km^{2}) of area, receives about 42.3 in/year of precipitation, has a wetness index of 379.72, and is about 40% forested.
