= Hillman Coal and Coke Company =

- Industry: Mining
- Founded: Pittsburgh, Pennsylvania
- Successor: Calgon Carbon
- Products: Coal
- Website: hillmancompany.com/history

The Hillman Coal and Coke Company was a bituminous coal mining company based in Pittsburgh, Pennsylvania. The company was formed by John Hartwell Hillman Sr. He established the Hillman Coal and Coke Company, and J. H. Hillman & Sons, which was eventually run by his three sons. The Hillman Coal and Coke Company later became Pittsburgh Coke & Chemical, and it is now Calgon Carbon.

The company built coal patch towns in the following locations:

- Arnold City, PA
- Jerome, PA

== Mines ==
- Alicia Mine, Monvue, PA
- Edna #1
- Naomi Mine, Fayette City, PA

== See also ==
- Coal companies of the United States
- Coal mining in the United States
