= Naomi Mine explosion =

1907 explosion in Naomi Mine, Pennsylvania, U.S.

Coordinates: 40.106°N 79.842°W

The Naomi Mine explosion occurred on December 1, 1907, in the Naomi Mine, approximately 2 miles (3.2 km) from Fayette City, Pennsylvania. The incident resulted in the deaths of at least 35 miners and left no survivors.

== Naomi Mine ==
The Naomi Mine was operated by Hillman Coal and Coke Company. It was situated east of the Monongahela River. The mine was built to exploit the Pittsburgh coal seam, which was positioned at a depth of 160 feet (49 m) below the surface of the mine. Coal was hauled out of the mine with carts that were equipped with electric motors.

From 1870 (the earliest year records were kept) to December 1, 1907 (the day the mine closed), a total of 63 men were killed in the Naomi Mine.

== Events and aftermath ==
The explosion happened at about 7:15 on the night of Sunday, December 1, 1907. Inadequate ventilation allowed pockets of explosive gas to accumulate in the interior of the mine. The gas was most likely ignited by an open light or electric arc, both of which would have been present at the time.

Several miners who lost their jobs in the closing of the Naomi Mine would soon find work in the Darr Mine located in nearby Westmoreland County, Pennsylvania. On December 19, 1907, many of these displaced miners would be killed in the Darr Mine Disaster, the deadliest coal mining disaster in Pennsylvania history.

All of the miners killed were immigrants from eastern Europe, including Rusyns, Hungarians (including Slovaks from Gemer and Abov - then part of Austria-Hungary), Austrians, Germans, Poles and Italians.
