= Col. Edward Cook House =

Historic house in Pennsylvania, United States

- U.S. National Register of Historic Places
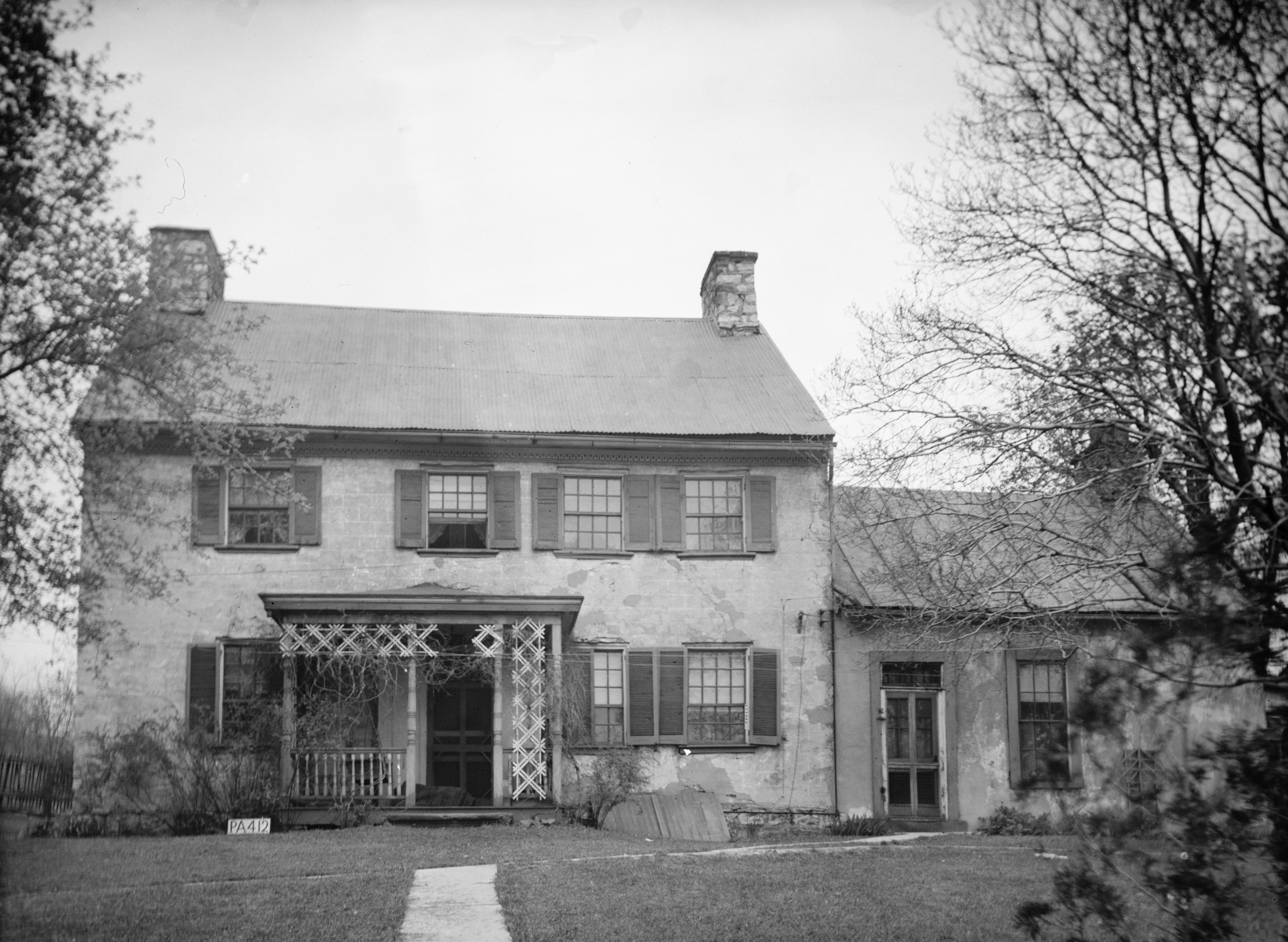
- Col. Edward Cook House, May 1936

- Location within Pennsylvania Location within the United States
- Location: East of Belle Vernon, Washington Township, Pennsylvania
- Coordinates: 40°7′37″N 79°49′38″W
- Area: 1 acre (0.40 ha)
- Built: 1772-1776
- Built by: Cook, Col. Edward
- NRHP reference No.: 78003090
- Added to NRHP: March 29, 1978

Col. Edward Cook House is a historic home located at Washington Township, Fayette County, Pennsylvania, USA. It was built between 1772 and 1776, and is a two-story, four-bay, rectangular stone dwelling with a one-story kitchen wing. The main block measures 36 feet by 28 feet and the kitchen wing 24 feet by 20 feet. It has a medium-pitched gable roof and plain cornice with return. Also on the property are a contributing smoke house and wash house.

It was added to the National Register of Historic Places in 1978.
