= Lookout, Pennsylvania =

Unincorporated area in Pennsylvania, U.S.

Coordinates: 41°46′39″N 75°10′40″W

Lookout is an unincorporated area in Wayne County, Pennsylvania, United States.

== History ==
A post office called Lookout was established in 1889, and remained in operation until 1969. The community was so named on account of its lofty elevation.
