= Sherrick Run (Jacobs Creek tributary) =

Stream in Pennsylvania, USA

Sherrick Run Tributary to Jacobs Creek
- Location of Sherrick Run mouth Sherrick Run (Jacobs Creek tributary) (the United States)

Location
- Country: United States
- State: Pennsylvania
- County: Westmoreland
- Borough: Mount Pleasant

Physical characteristics
- Source: Wilson Run divide
  - location: pond about 1 mile northwest of Mount Pleasant, Pennsylvania
  - coordinates: 40°10′12″N 079°33′47″W
  - elevation: 1,160 ft (350 m)
- Mouth: Jacobs Creek
  - location: Iron Bridge, Pennsylvania
  - coordinates: 40°06′45″N 079°33′47″W
  - elevation: 1,027 ft (313 m)
- Length: 4.31 mi (6.94 km)
- Basin size: 4.89 square miles (12.7 km^{2})
- Discharge
  - location: Jacobs Creek
  - average: 6.98 cu ft/s (0.198 m^{3}/s) at mouth with Jacobs Creek

Basin features
- Progression: generally south
- River system: Monongahela River
- Tributaries
  - left: unnamed tributaries
  - right: unnamed tributaries
- Bridges: Old 119, US 119, Kings Pointe Road, PA 31, Valley Kitchen Road, PA 981, S Quarry Street, Smouse Road (x2), PA 819, US 119

Sherrick Run is a 4.31 mi (6.94 km) long 1st order tributary to Jacobs Creek in Westmoreland County, Pennsylvania.

== Course ==
Sherrick Run rises in a pond about 1 mile northwest of Mount Pleasant, Pennsylvania, and then flows south to join Jacobs Creek at Iron Bridge.

== Watershed ==
Sherrick Run drains 4.89 square miles (12.7 km^{2}) of area, receives about 42.3 in/year of precipitation, has a wetness index of 388.72, and is about 17% forested.
