= Jacobs Creek, Pennsylvania =

Unincorporated community in Pennsylvania, US

- Unincorporated community
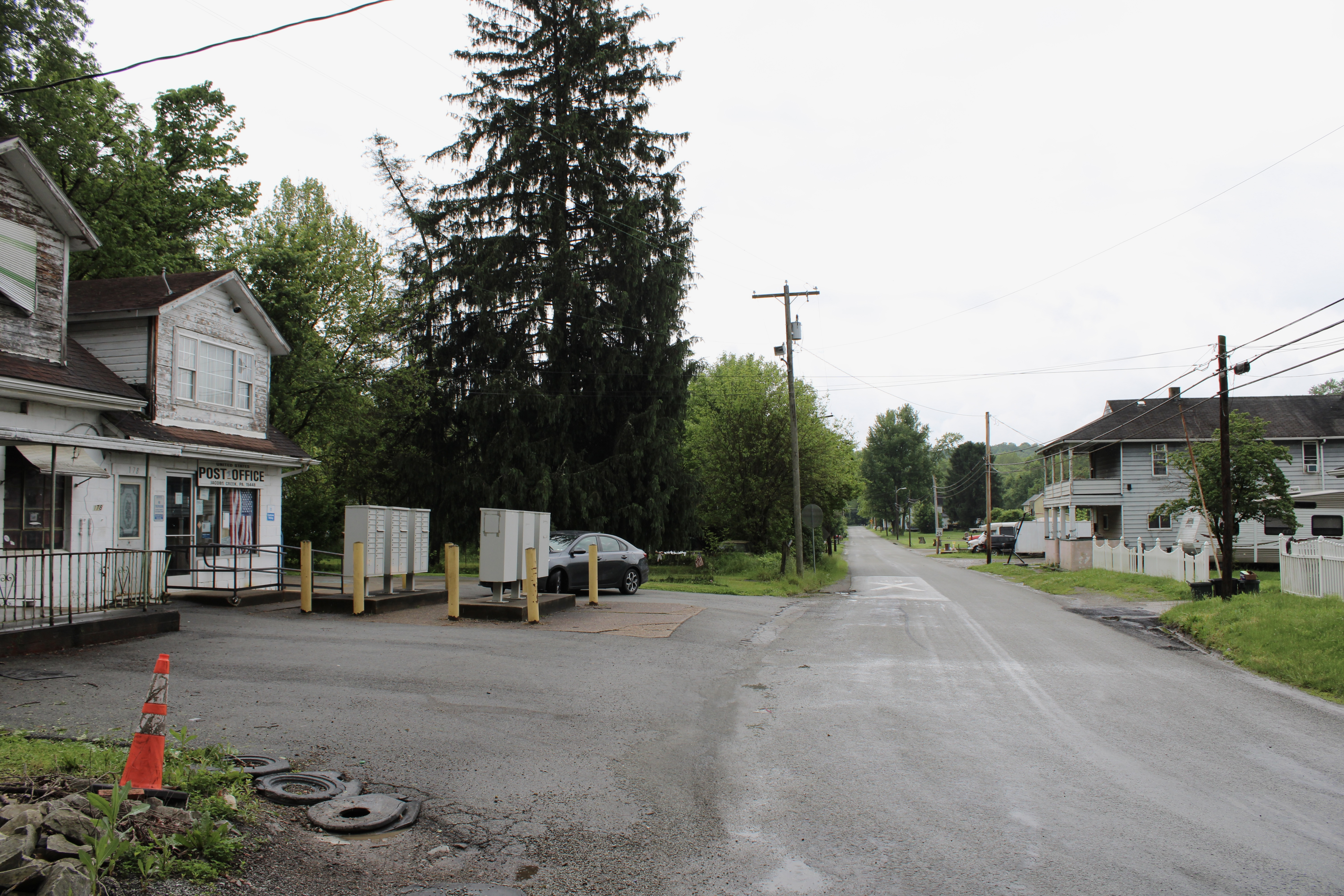
- Post Office Road

- Location within Pennsylvania
- Coordinates: 40°07′45″N 79°44′30″W
- Country: United States
- State: Pennsylvania
- County: Westmoreland
- Elevation: 787 ft (240 m)
- Time zone: UTC-5 (Eastern (EST))
  - Summer (DST): UTC-4 (EDT)
- ZIP code: 15448
- Area codes: 724, 878
- GNIS feature ID: 1177958

Jacobs Creek is an unincorporated community in Westmoreland County, Pennsylvania, United States. The community is located at the mouth of Jacobs Creek on the Youghiogheny River, 1.5 miles (2.4 km) south of Smithton. Jacobs Creek has a post office with ZIP code 15448, which opened on December 14, 1865.

== History ==
The community was named after Jacobs Creek, a tributary of the Youghiogheny River, which in turn was named after Captain Jacobs, a local Lenape chief who lived along the creek in the mid 1700s, and was killed in 1756 by Colonel John Armstrong's Expedition which wiped out the Native American village of Kittanning.

The area was opened to settlers in 1768 following the signing of the Treaty of Fort Stanwix.

One of the first buildings in the Jacobs Creek settlement was the old log Jacobs Creek Methodist Episcopal Church, built in 1817.

In December 1907, an explosion at the Darr Mine killed 239 men and boys from Jacobs Creek and the nearby settlement of Van Meter.
