= Log Pile, Pennsylvania =

Unincorporated community in Pennsylvania, US

Log Pile
- Unincorporated community
- Location within the state of Pennsylvania Log Pile (the United States)
- Coordinates: 40°9′47″N 80°17′33″W
- Country: United States
- State: Pennsylvania
- County: Washington
- Elevation: 1,122 ft (342 m)
- Time zone: UTC-5 (Eastern (EST))
  - Summer (DST): UTC-4 (EDT)
- GNIS feature ID: 1179806

Log Pile is an unincorporated community in Washington County, Pennsylvania, United States.
