= Calgon Carbon =

American manufacturer of products to remove contaminants and odors

Calgon Carbon Corporation
- Type: Subsidiary
- Traded as: NYSE: CCC
- Industry: Industrial Processing, Water Treatment
- Founded: 1942 (as Pittsburgh Coke & Chemical Company)
- Headquarters: Pittsburgh, Pennsylvania
- Key people: Stevan Schott (President/CEO)
- Revenue: ▲$555 Million USD (2014)
- Number of employees: 1,400
- Parent: Kuraray
- Website: www.calgoncarbon.com

Calgon Carbon Corporation is a Pittsburgh, Pennsylvania based company that manufactures and markets products that remove contaminants and odors from liquids and gases, both for industrial, municipal, and consumer markets. Calgon Carbon's product lines typically use activated carbon in various forms,

Originally formed as the Pittsburgh Coke & Chemical Company in the 1940s, the company's main operations are currently centered in North America. The company has its presence overseas such as Chemviron Carbon in Europe, Calgon Carbon Japan KK in Japan, Calgon Carbon Thailand Ltd. in Thailand, and Hyde Marine, Inc. As of 2015 Calgon Carbon operates fifteen facilities for manufacturing, reactivation, and equipment in the US, Asia, and Europe, and employs around 1,100 people. In early 2015 the company moved their headquarters from the Pittsburgh suburb of Robinson to nearby Moon Township.

== History ==
=== Formation and government contract (1940s–1950s) ===
Calgon Carbon Corporation was founded as the Pittsburgh Coke and Chemical Corporation in Pittsburgh, Pennsylvania, which later merged with the Hillman Coal and Coke Company. Initially the company manufactured products such as coke fuel in support of the local steel industry. Owned in part by the Pittsburgh "steel tycoon" J. Hartwell Hillman, Jr., in 1940 the company began operating a manufacturing plant on Neville Island. In 1956, Fortune Magazine ranked Pittsburgh Coke & Chemical as No. 488 on the Fortune 500.

=== Pittsburgh Activated Carbon (1960s–1980s) ===
In the early 1960s the Neville Island facility became the formation site of Pittsburgh Activated Carbon Company, the next evolution of the company. In 1965 the Calgon Corporation acquired Pittsburgh Activated Carbon.

=== Going public (1980s–1990s) ===
Calgon Carbon was listed on the New York Stock Exchange in 1991, and throughout the 1990s it bought a number of subsidiaries, with Calgon Carbon's executive Colin Bailey overseeing many of the acquisitions.

In 1997 Calgon Carbon Asia was formed as a marketing subsidiary in Singapore, serving much of Asia, India, Australia and New Zealand. Calgon Carbon Corporation's CEO resigned in February 1998, reportedly over differences with the board of directors over company direction, and Calgon Carbon hired the firm Morgan Stanley for advice on a possible company sale.

=== UV products and expansion (2000–2013) ===
Calgon Carbon acquired the firm Zwicky Denmark and Sweden in 2010, which had long been a distributor for Chemivron Carbon, and Calgon Carbon also purchased the stock of Hyde Marine, a company that manufacturers equipment using filtration and UV disinfection to treat marine ballast water.

Randy Dearth became Calgon Carbon's CEO in June 2012, after his predecessor John Stanik retired. Dearth had previously worked at Bayer Corporation and as a CEO of Lanxess Corporation. In May 2013 Dearth announced the company would be working to cut annual expenses by $30 million by the end of 2014. The company, which had recently closed a plant in China, reduced their number of products by 45 percent early in the cost-cutting cycle. Calgon Carbon also did an early retirement program and restructured their business units.

=== Growth and new headquarters (2013–2015) ===
As of September 2013 Calgon Carbon was "one of the top three suppliers of activated carbon for the mercury removal market and supplies 32 electric generating units that produce 14.2 gigawatts of electricity." That summer the EPA's pending Mercury and Air Toxins Standards required all power plants to filter the mercury emitted by burning coal. At the time, the EPA recommended activated carbon as the best available "control technology for mercury removal." Calgon Carbon predicted that when the policies are implemented in April 2015, the demand for activated carbon might double. Calgon Carbon products are distributed by Brenntag Canada in Canada, and in September 2013 they signed a near $30 million contract for Calgon Carbon's FLUEPAC product, which is a powdered activated carbon that can filter mercury.

As of February 2014 the company sold 50 million pounds of GAC annually to municipalities to be used for treatment of drinking water. Continuing to branch into Asia, that month the company signed a contract with DaeWoo Engineering and Construction to supply 5.6 million pounds of GAC to a drinking water plant that provides water for about 600,000 residents in Seoul, South Korea. Also at that time the company signed a 10-year contract to treat drinking water for the Palmdale Water District in California, which serves around 115,000 people.

In late 2012 the stock was around $12 a share, before hovering around $20 in 2014. The U.S. Department of Commerce imposed tariffs in November 2014 on activated carbon imports from China, doubling the average import tax. Calgon Carbon announced it would be affected by fluctuating market prices. In February 2015 the company announced a 10% increase in fourth quarter profits, citing increased demand for activated carbon for mercury removal and industrial water treatment. After the announcement, shares rose 7%.

In early 2015 the company moved their headquarters from the Pittsburgh suburb of Robinson to nearby Moon Township. The new building combined the main research laboratory and corporate staff, which had previously been in separate facilities.

=== Acquisition of CECA - Carbonisation Et Charbons Actifs (2016) ===
Calgon Carbon Corporation announced in February 2016 that it completed its acquisition of the wood-based activated carbon, reactivation and mineral-based filtration media business from CECA (Carbonisation Et Charbons Actifs), a subsidiary of Arkema Group.

=== Calgon Carbon acquired by Kuraray (2018) ===
Calgon Carbon was acquired by Kuraray Co., Ltd. in March 2018.

== See also ==
- Ultraviolet germicidal irradiation
- Activated carbon
