= Longswamp, Pennsylvania =

Unincorporated community in Pennsylvania, US

- Unincorporated community
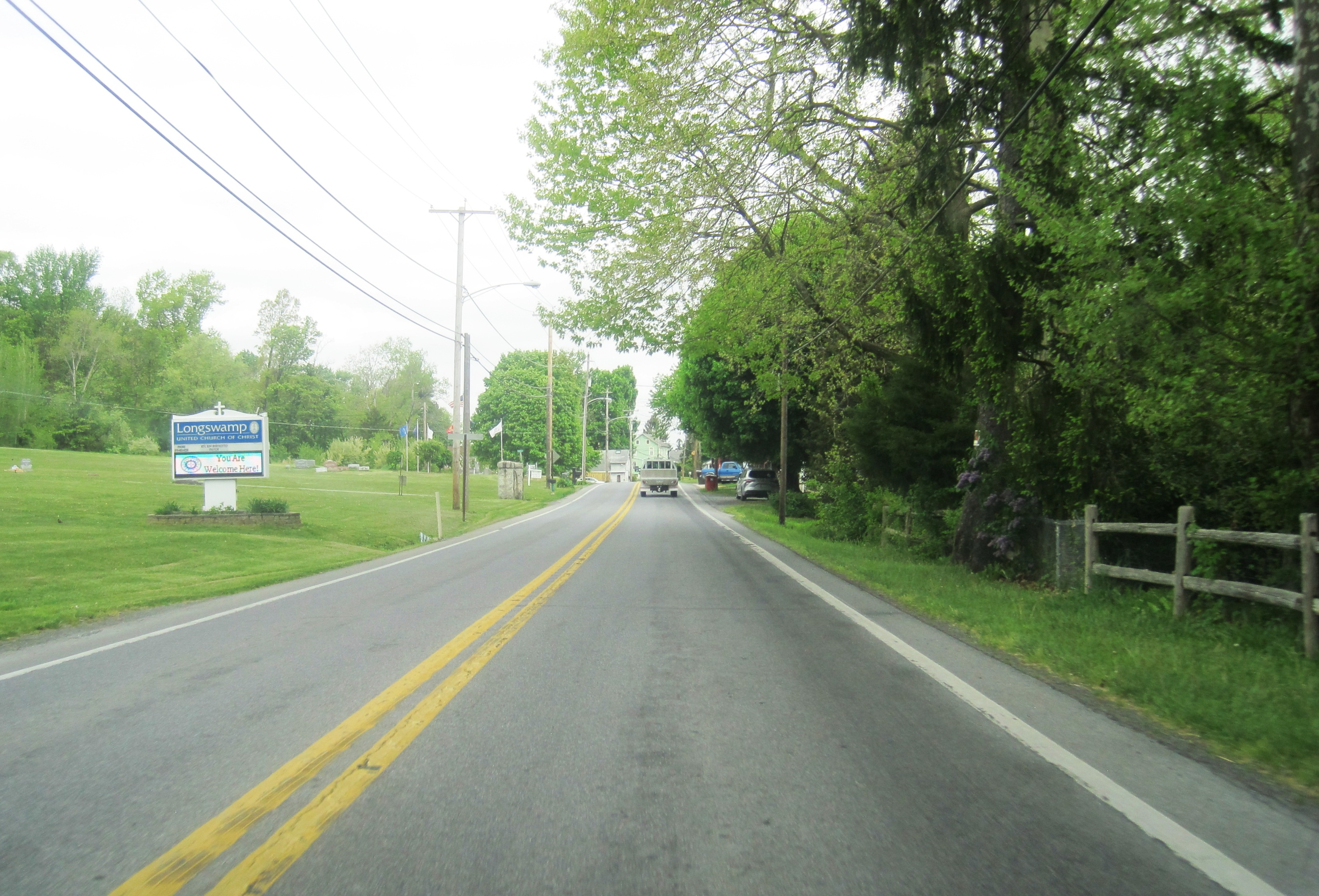
- Westbound State Street in Longswamp

- Location within Pennsylvania
- Coordinates: 40°29′53″N 75°39′18″W
- Country: United States
- State: Pennsylvania
- County: Berks
- Township: Longswamp
- Elevation: 502 ft (153 m)
- Time zone: UTC-5 (Eastern (EST))
  - Summer (DST): UTC-4 (EDT)
- Area codes: 610 and 484
- GNIS feature ID: 1179926

Longswamp is an unincorporated community in Longswamp Township in Berks County, Pennsylvania, United States. Longswamp is located along State Street southeast of Topton.

== History ==
A post office called Longswamp was established in 1822, and remained in operation until 1906. The community took its name from Longswamp Township.
