= Lynnwood-Pricedale, Pennsylvania =

Unincorporated community in Pennsylvania, US

- Census-designated place
- Location of Lynwood-Pricedale in Pennsylvania Lynnwood-Pricedale, Pennsylvania (the United States)
- Coordinates: 40°8′1″N 79°51′13″W
- Country: United States
- State: Pennsylvania
- Counties: Fayette
- Townships: Washington

Area
  - Total: 1.27 sq mi (3.29 km^{2})
  - Land: 1.24 sq mi (3.20 km^{2})
  - Water: 0.035 sq mi (0.09 km^{2})

Population (2020)
  - Total: 2,074
  - Density: 1,678.2/sq mi (647.97/km^{2})
- Time zone: UTC-4 (EST)
  - Summer (DST): UTC-5 (EDT)
- ZIP Code: 15012
- Area code: 724
- FIPS code: 42-45732

Lynnwood-Pricedale is a census-designated place (CDP) in Fayette and Westmoreland counties in the Pennsylvania. The population was 2,031 at the 2010 census, down from 2,168 at the 2000 census. The community of Lynwood is located in Fayette County's Washington Township, while Pricedale is part of Westmoreland County's Rostraver Township.

== Geography ==
Lynnwood-Pricedale is located in the northwestern corner of Fayette County and the southwestern corner of Westmoreland County at 40°8′1″N 79°51′13″W (40.133506, -79.853685). It is bordered by Fairhope and Naomi to the south, and by the boroughs of Belle Vernon and North Belle Vernon to the west. The southwestern border of the CDP is the Monongahela River, which forms the Washington County line. The borough of Dunlevy is directly across the river from Lynnwood-Pricedale.

Interstate 70 passes through the northern part of the CDP, with access from Exit 43 (Pennsylvania Route 201). I-70 leads east 15 miles (24 km) to the Pennsylvania Turnpike at New Stanton and west 25 miles (40 km) to Washington.

According to the U.S. Census Bureau, the Lynnwood-Pricedale CDP has a total area of 1.28 square miles (3.31 km^{2}), of which 1.24 square miles (3.21 km^{2}) is land and 0.04 square miles (0.10 km^{2}), or 2.91%, is water.

== Demographics ==
Historical population
Census	Pop.	Note	%±
2000	2,168		—
2020	2,074		—
U.S. Decennial Census

As of the census of 2000, there were 2,168 people, 951 households, and 648 families living in the area. The population density was 1,721.7 inhabitants per square mile (664.8/km^{2}). There were 998 housing units at an average density of 792.5 per square mile (306.0/km^{2}). The racial makeup of the area was 96.82% White, 2.49% African American, 0.14% Native American, 0.32% Asian, 0.05% Pacific Islander, 0.09% from other races, and 0.09% from two or more races. Hispanic or Latino of any race were 0.55% of the population.

There were 951 households, out of which 23.2% had children under the age of 18 living with them, 54.4% were married couples living together, 10.5% had a female householder with no husband present, and 31.8% were non-families. 29.5% of all households were made up of individuals, and 16.5% had someone living alone who was 65 years of age or older. The average household size was 2.28 and the average family size was 2.79.

In the area the population was spread out, with 18.7% under the age of 18, 5.9% from 18 to 24, 24.2% from 25 to 44, 24.4% from 45 to 64, and 26.9% who were 65 years of age or older. The median age was 46 years. For every 100 females, there were 89.0 males. For every 100 females age 18 and over, there were 88.4 males.

The median income for a household in the area was $30,595, and the median income for a family was $34,617. Males had a median income of $29,432 versus $27,188 for females. The per capita income for the area was $17,112. About 5.3% of families and 6.2% of the population were below the poverty line, including 9.0% of those under age 18 and 4.1% of those age 65 or over.
