= Lochiel, Pennsylvania =

Populated place in Pennsylvania, U.S.

Coordinates: 40°56′54″N 76°57′16″W

Lochiel is a populated place located three miles west-southwest of Linntown in Union County, Pennsylvania, United States.
