= Lowber, Westmoreland County, Pennsylvania =

Unincorporated community in Pennsylvania, US

Lowber, Pennsylvania
- Unincorporated community
- Location within Pennsylvania
- Coordinates: 40°14′45″N 79°46′15″W
- Country: United States
- State: Pennsylvania
- County: Westmoreland
- Elevation: 778 ft (237 m)
- Time zone: UTC-5 (Eastern (EST))
  - Summer (DST): UTC-4 (EDT)
- ZIP code: 15660
- Area code: 724
- GNIS feature ID: 1180000

Lowber is an unincorporated community in Westmoreland County, Pennsylvania, United States. The community is 2.5 miles (4.0 km) north of West Newton. Lowber has a post office, with ZIP code 15660 and is the home of Lowber Volunteer fire department and a small park. This area does not have enough people living in the area to be called a town, so it is a village. The town has a Building which now occupies a company that used to be a school in the Yough school district. In the park there is the old school's bell.
