= Kecksburg, Pennsylvania =

Unincorporated community in Pennsylvania, US

- Unincorporated community
- Kecksburg Road

- Location within the U.S. state of Pennsylvania
- Coordinates: 40°11′05″N 79°27′41″W
- Country: United States
- State: Pennsylvania
- County: Westmoreland
- Founder: Johann Martin Keck
- Elevation: 1,209 ft (369 m)
- Time zone: UTC-5 (Eastern (EST))
  - Summer (DST): UTC-4 (EDT)

Kecksburg is an unincorporated community in Mount Pleasant Township, Westmoreland County, Pennsylvania, United States. Located in a heavily wooded area along PA Route 982, it is approximately thirty miles southeast of Pittsburgh at an elevation of 1,209 feet.

== History ==
Sometime around 1860, the community of Kecksburg was laid out on five acres of land purchased by German merchant, farmer and businessman Johann Martin Keck. In 1868, Keck was appointed postmaster of the town, being the first to occupy this position after the establishment of the office, and held the role for twenty-six years.

In August 1888, residents of Kecksburg established a Grover Cleveland Democratic society to increase Democratic voter turnout in future elections.

During the fall of 1890, George H. Sewell, district deputy grand chancellor of the Knights of Pythias, established a new organizational lodge for the fraternal service group in Kecksburg.

In March 1892, J.M. Keck & Sons purchased Jacob Rumbaugh's farm in Kecksburg, which was located adjacent to land owned by the Frick Coke Company in Mammoth. Newspapers stated that the owners of J.M. Keck & Sons intended to build "a large plant of ovens" on the former farmland, which was reportedly situated above a large coal deposit. During early November of that same year, intense forest fires on the mountainside above the communities of Kecksburg and Waterford destroyed roughly thirty thousand acres of timber.

== Unexplained phenomena ==
=== Haunted farmhouse ===
In December 1892, Pittsburgh-area newspapers reported on an investigation by "three to ten men" of "so-called supernatural phenomena" that had allegedly been occurring at an "old stone farmhouse" in Kecksburg for "some weeks past." The Pittsburgh Post reported that "several of [the investigators had] been taken out of the bedroom where the demonstrations [by the alleged ghost were] made in an unconscious condition," adding that "the spirits [had] made no trouble for the occupants" until the previous fall when work "to remodel the building resulted in the demonstrations that are now the talk of the country-side." According to a Post reporter, the alleged ghost was said to have been that of the farm's former owner, David Ranler, who had been "driven off the farm" by the area's sheriff after the farm was foreclosed on and sold during the financial Panic of 1857, even though Ranler only still owed a small amount on his mortgage after having spent roughly twenty years paying it off. Forced into poverty as a result, Ranler ended up homeless, destitute and alone because his fiancee had also died around this same time, and "swore he would haunt the man or woman who tried to alter the condition of things on the farm if he died before he got it back." The incidents in question involved "hammerings all over the frame of the bed" of the subsequent owner of the farmhouse, William Newell, "tearing of the bed-clothing and the violent ejectment of anyone who attempted to sleep in that particular bed or room" that was allegedly haunted.

=== UFO incident ===
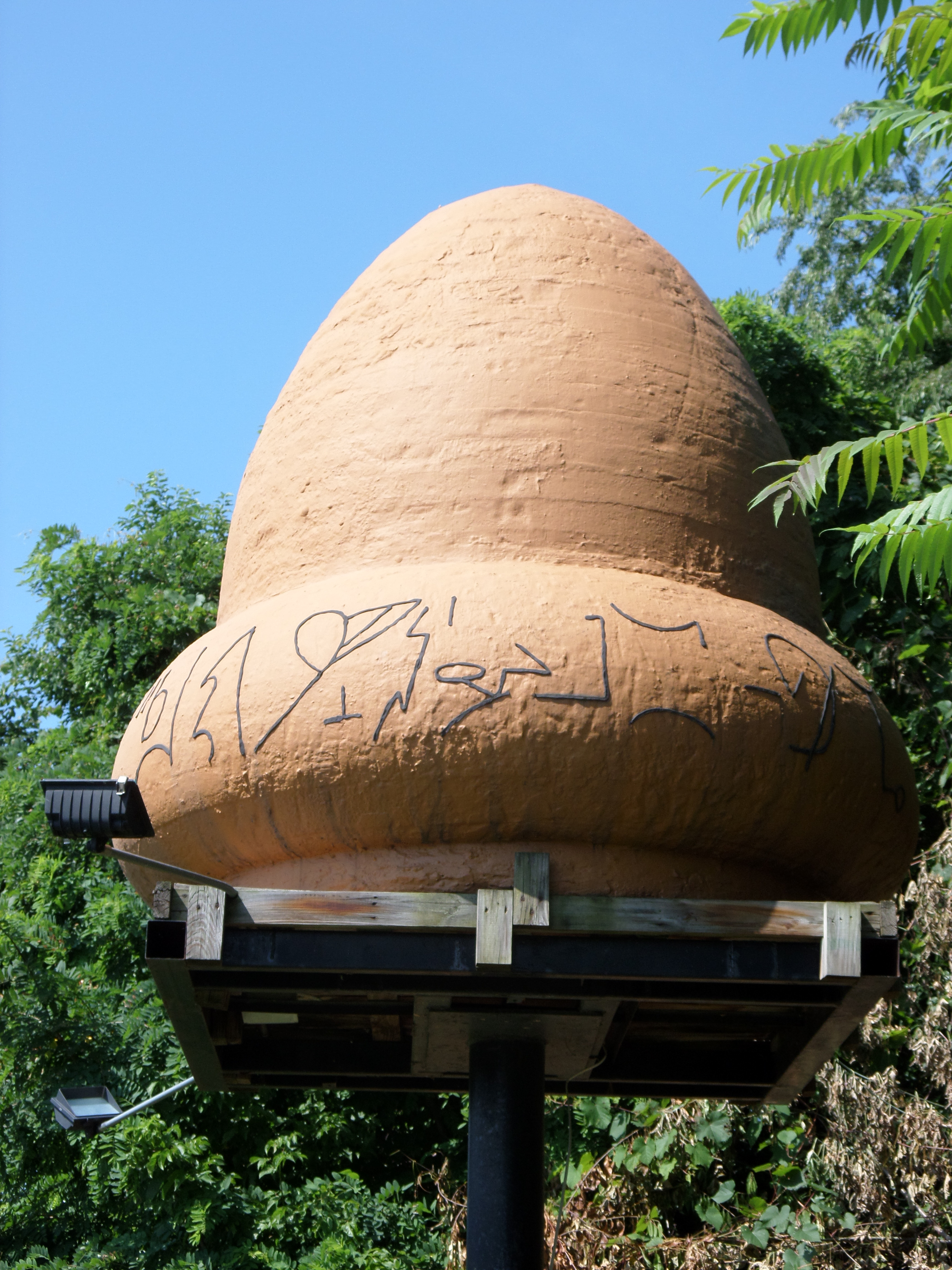
A model depicting the supposedly crashed object, called the "space acorn", originally created for the show Unsolved Mysteries, and put on display near the Kecksburg fire station.

On December 9, 1965 a large, brilliant fireball was seen by thousands in at least six states and Ontario, Canada. It streaked over the Detroit, Michigan/Windsor, Ontario area, dropped metal debris over Michigan and northern Ohio, and caused sonic booms in Western Pennsylvania. The fireball crashed in the woods just outside Kecksburg and was reportedly acorn-shaped. Some speculated that it was a UFO, however the United States government officially stated that it was just a meteor. It is now believed to have been the Soviet Kosmos 96 spacecraft.

To celebrate this local event, the Kecksburg Volunteer Fire Department holds an annual festival featuring presentations by UFO enthusiasts, vendor booths, and a community parade.

In 1990, the television show Unsolved Mysteries created a large, metallic, bell-shaped object to accompany their story on the incident. After the story aired, the show donated the model to the town, and it was placed on a wooden pedestal behind the Kecksburg Volunteer Fire Department. It is now mounted on a metal pedestal lit with spotlights.

== See also ==
- Fallingwater
- Flight 93 National Memorial
- Frank Lloyd Wright, architect (Futuristic Mound Builder) who designed "Fallingwater"
- Laurel Caverns
- Laurel Highlands
- Monongahela culture
- Monongahela River
- Mound Builders
- Mount Pleasant, Pennsylvania
- Mount Pleasant Township, Westmoreland County, Pennsylvania
- Ohiopyle State Park, opened in 1965
- Point Pleasant, West Virginia
- Youghiogheny River
