= Fayette City, Pennsylvania =

Borough in Pennsylvania, US

- Borough
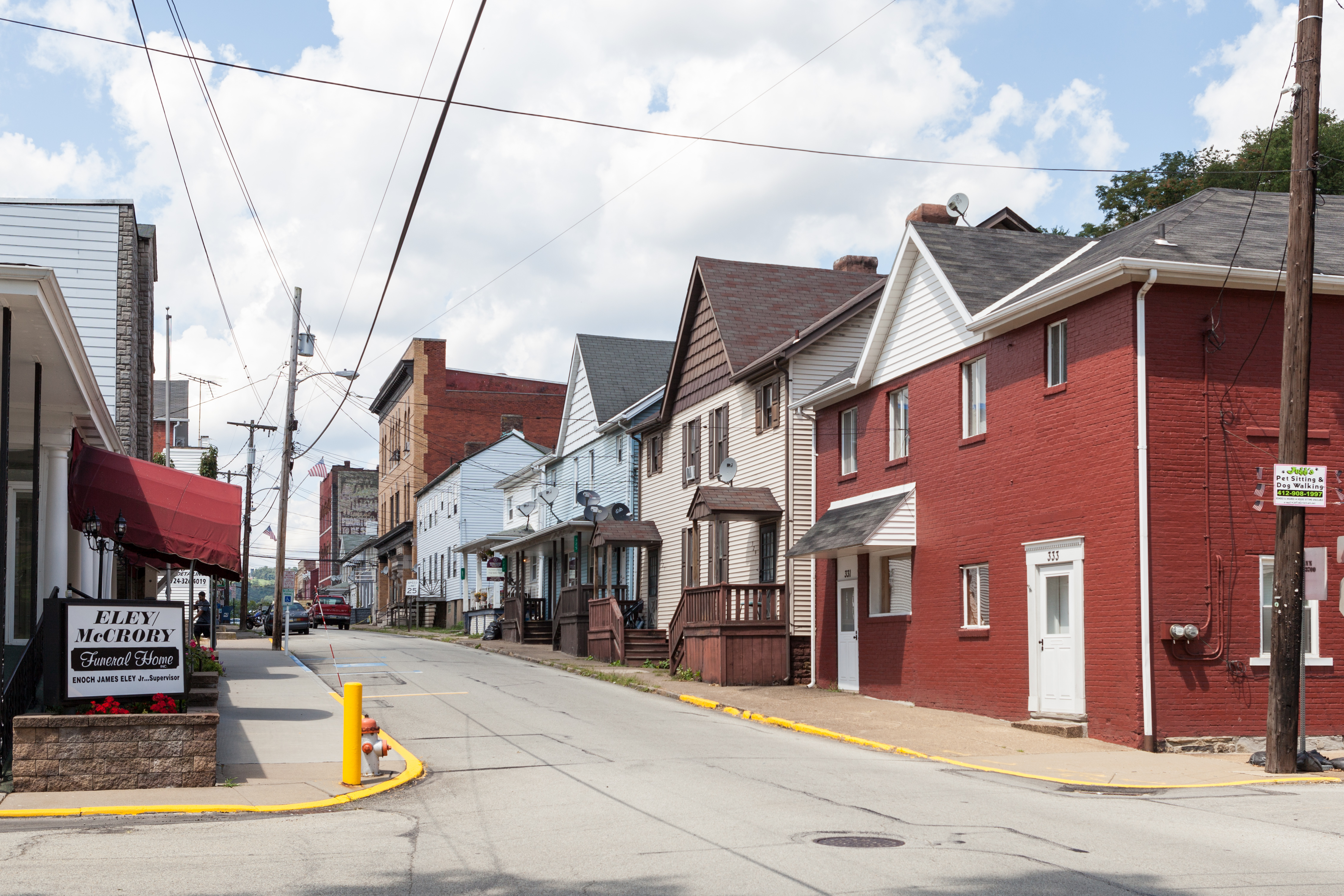
- 300 block of Main Street

- Location of Fayette City in Fayette County, Pennsylvania.

- Location in Pennsylvania Fayette City (the United States)
- Coordinates: 40°6′2″N 79°50′20″W
- Country: United States
- State: Pennsylvania
- County: Fayette
- Established: 1806

Government
  - Type: Mayor–council government
  - Mayor: Herbert Vargo Jr.

Area
  - Total: 0.28 sq mi (0.73 km^{2})
  - Land: 0.22 sq mi (0.57 km^{2})
  - Water: 0.062 sq mi (0.16 km^{2})
- Elevation: 770 ft (230 m)

Population (2020)
  - Total: 502
  - Density: 2,263.2/sq mi (873.84/km^{2})
- Time zone: UTC-4 (EST)
  - Summer (DST): UTC-5 (EDT)
- Postal code: 15438
- Area code: 724
- FIPS code: 42-25456

Fayette City is a borough in Fayette County, Pennsylvania, United States. The population was 502 at the 2020 census, a decline from the figure of 596 tabulated in 2010. It is served by the Belle Vernon Area School District. Some buildings in the town antedate 1820.

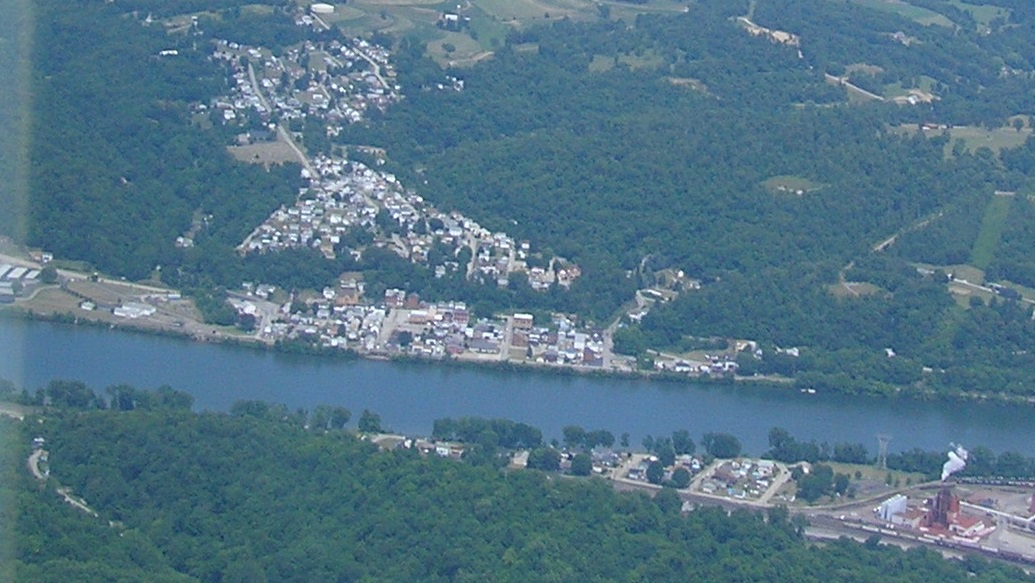
Fayette City PA

Herbert Vargo Jr. is the current mayor. His term ends in 2025. He was first elected to the office in 1993.

== History ==
Fayette City was originally known as Freeport, founded in 1794 by Colonel Edward Cook. In 1825, Freeport was renamed Cookstown in honor of Colonel Cook who had died in 1812. On April 11, 1854 the town's name was changed to Fayette City, in honor of the Marquis de Lafayette.

In 1895 the Pittsburgh and Lake Erie railroad completed an extension to Fayette City.

A ferry operated between Fayette City and Allenport from 1820–1962.

In 2012, the mayor Herbert Vargo Jr. pled guilty to running a numbers scheme and was sentenced to a year of probation.

=== Coal mining ===
Fayette City's mining history dates to 1830, when the Cardondelet, Furlong, and Snow Hill mines were sunk.

The town received many European immigrants who came to work in local coal mines. Like many towns in this area, Fayette City has been home to many coal miners supporting the coal industry in the region. These immigrants included people from Italy, Poland, Austria-Hungary, and Rusyns.

In the early 1900s, there were over twenty mines operating around Fayette City. Many of these mines were consolidated under ownership by the Monongahela River Consolidated Coal and Coke Company,

Coal Mines Near Fayette City
Mine Name	Opened	Closed	Notes
Tremont			
Naomi	1870	1907	35 miners killed in explosion
Marine			
Arnold 1			
Arnold 2			
Arnold 3			
Hill Top			
Fayette City			,
Furlong			
Apollo			
Bargedde	1863		
Little Redstone	1879	1915	
Cardondelet	1834		
Connecticut	1865	1872	
Turnbull	1848		
Troytown/Alps	1844		
Alice			
Snow Hill	1932		
Stimmel	1863		
Vesta 1			
Vesta 2			
Vesta 3			
Vesta 4	1933	1984	At one time was the largest bituminous coal mine in the world
Clipper			

Fayette City was the site of the Naomi Mine explosion, December 7, 1907. All of the men killed in the Naomi disaster were immigrants from eastern Europe.

Fayette City was also the location of an explosion in the Apollo Mine in January 1926.

By 1920, the mines around Fayette City started to close.

=== Churches ===
The town has been home to numerous churches since its founding. These include:

Fayette City Churches
Church Name	Year Organized	Details
Free-Will Baptist Church	1820	Closed in 1870
The Church of Christ	1836	
The Presbyterian Church	1871	Building built in 1901
The Reorganized Mormon Church	1886	
St Edwards Slavish Church	1902	Greek Catholic, later combined with St Esubius in 1964
St Esubius Catholic Church	1905	

== Geography ==
Fayette City is located in northwestern Fayette County at 40°6′2″N 79°50′20″W (40.100647, −79.838913). It sits on the east bank of the Monongahela River, which forms the border with Washington County. The borough of Allenport is directly across the river, but the closest river crossing is the I-70 bridge, 3 miles (5 km) north at Belle Vernon. Pennsylvania Route 201 passes through Fayette City as Main Street (northbound) and Second Street (southbound). Uniontown, the Fayette County seat, is 17 miles (27 km) to the southeast via PA 201 and PA 51.

According to the United States Census Bureau, the borough has a total area of 0.25 square miles (0.66 km^{2}), of which 0.19 square miles (0.50 km^{2}) is land and 0.06 square miles (0.16 km^{2}), or 24.33%, is water.

Fayette City's low elevation and location along the Monongahela River make it susceptible to flooding after heavy rains. Lamb Lick Run and Downers Run enter the Monongahela within the borough's boundaries.

== Demographics ==
Historical population
Census	Pop.	Note	%±
1840	411		—
1850	972		136.5%
1860	820		−15.6%
1870	889		8.4%
1880	867		−2.5%
1890	931		7.4%
1900	1,595		71.3%
1910	2,005		25.7%
1920	2,018		0.6%
1930	1,594		−21.0%
1940	1,598		0.3%
1950	1,404		−12.1%
1960	1,159		−17.5%
1970	968		−16.5%
1980	788		−18.6%
1990	713		−9.5%
2000	714		0.1%
2010	596		−16.5%
2020	502		−15.8%
2021 (est.)	495	▼	−1.4%

As of the 2000 census, there were 714 people, 286 households, and 193 families residing in the borough. The population density was 2,769.2 inhabitants per square mile (1,069.2/km^{2}). There were 321 housing units at an average density of 1,245.0 per square mile (480.7/km^{2}). The racial makeup of the borough was 99.30% White, 0.14% African American, and 0.56% from two or more races. Hispanic or Latino of any race were 0.14% of the population.

There were 286 households, out of which 33.2% had children under the age of 18 living with them, 45.5% were married couples living together, 15.4% had a female householder with no husband present, and 32.5% were non-families. 30.1% of all households were made up of individuals, and 16.8% had someone living alone who was 65 years of age or older. The average household size was 2.50 and the average family size was 3.11.

In the borough the population was spread out, with 27.3% under the age of 18, 7.7% from 18 to 24, 29.3% from 25 to 44, 20.2% from 45 to 64, and 15.5% who were 65 years of age or older. The median age was 38 years. For every 100 females, there were 88.9 males. For every 100 females age 18 and over, there were 85.4 males.

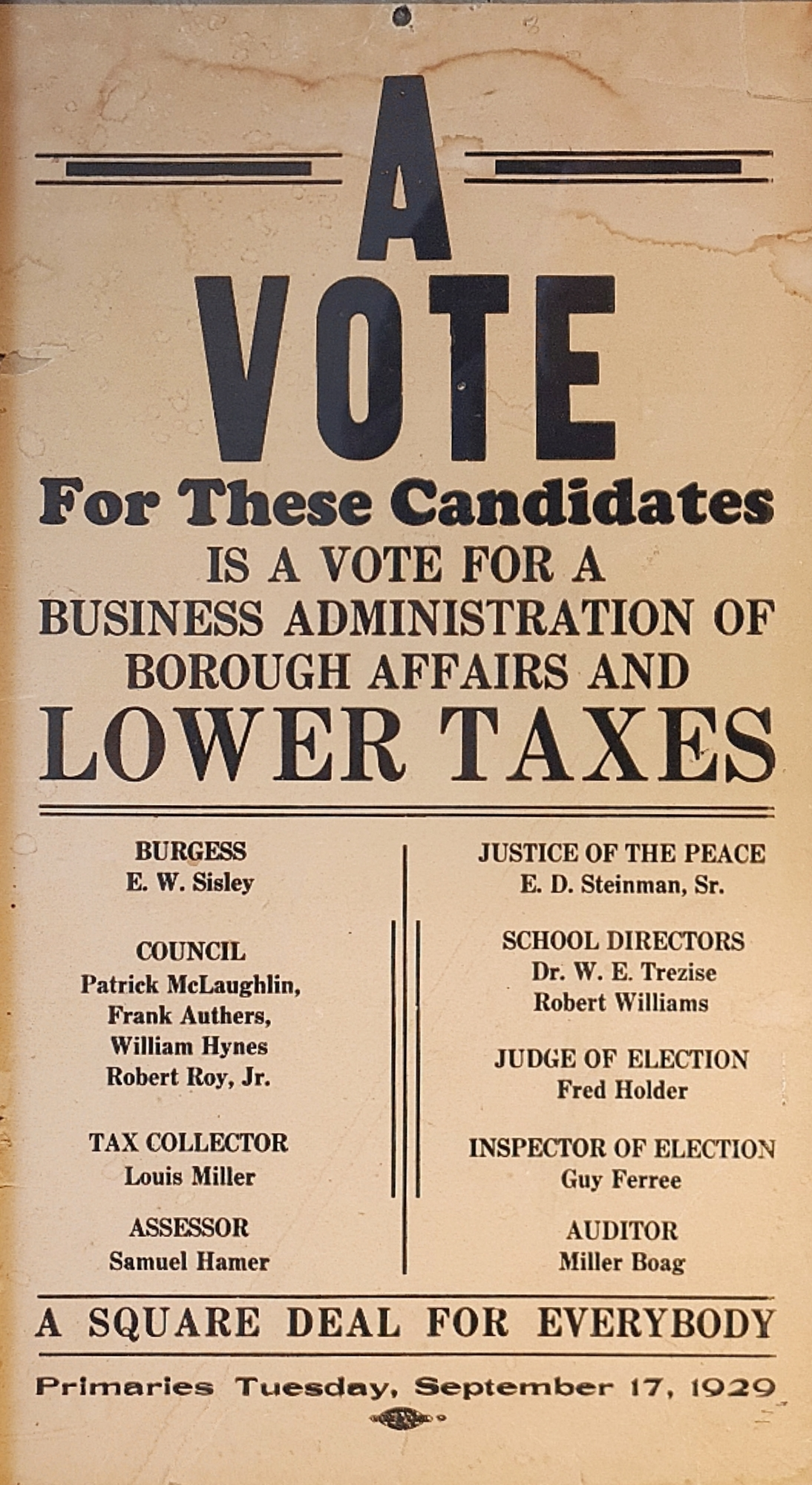
Election campaign poster from Fayette City, Pennsylvania promoting a slate of candidates for a primary held on Tuesday, September 17, 1929.

The median income for a household in the borough was $29,375, and the median income for a family was $38,542. Males had a median income of $35,357 versus $23,250 for females. The per capita income for the borough was $13,058. About 20.2% of families and 26.1% of the population were below the poverty line, including 38.8% of those under age 18 and 17.3% of those age 65 or over.

== Notable people ==
- Jim Russell, baseball player.
- Angelo Spagnolo, "World's Worst Avid Golfer."
