= Robert Morin (librarian) =

Left $4 mln to University of New Hampshire

- Born: January 3, 1938; Nashua, New Hampshire, US
- Died: March 31, 2015 (aged 77)
- Education: Simmons College
- Occupations: Librarian; philanthropist
- Employer: University of New Hampshire
- Known for: Bequeathed US$4 million to University of New Hampshire

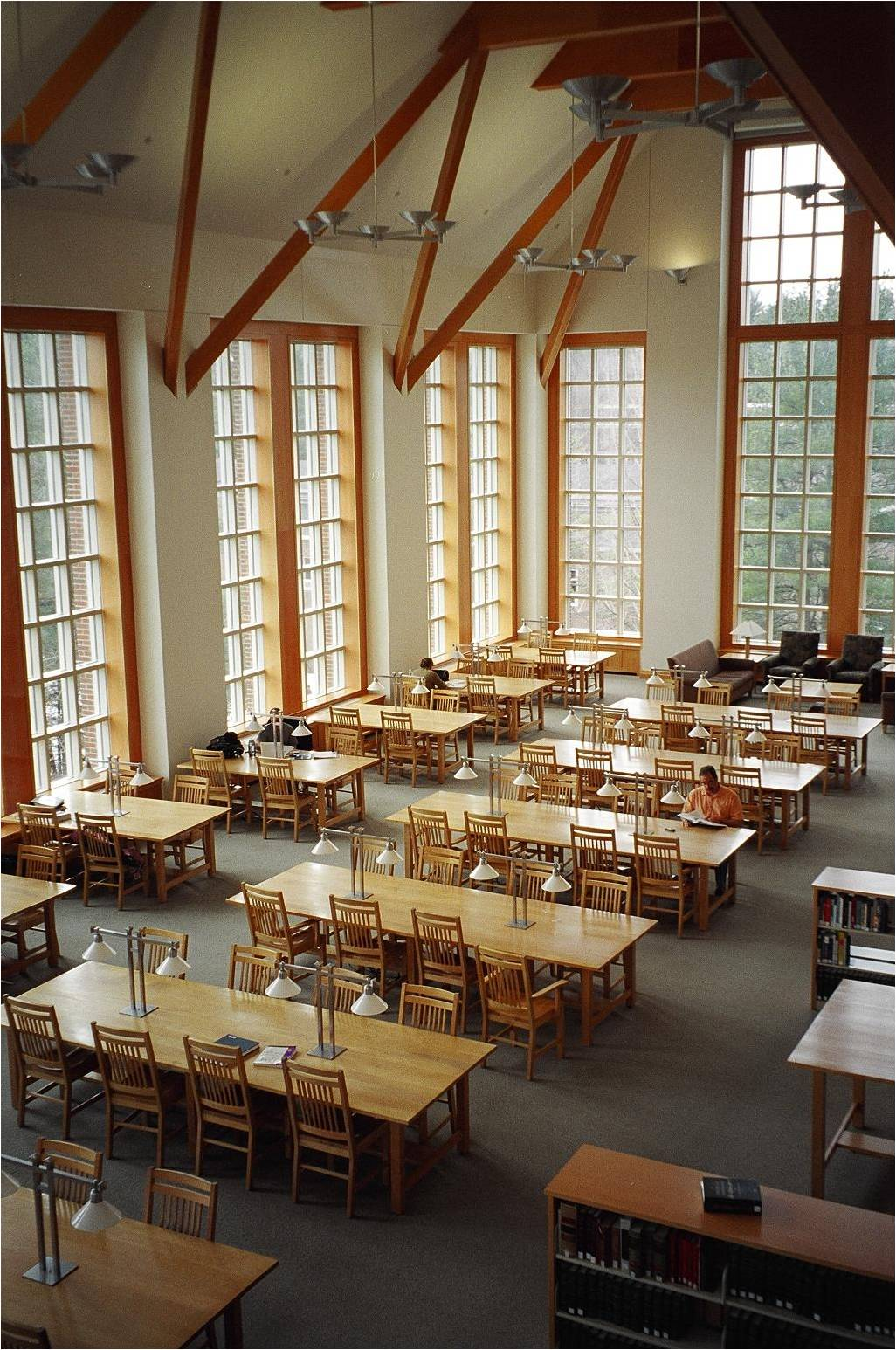
Reading room in Dimond Library

Robert Morin (January 3, 1938 – March 31, 2015) was an American librarian who worked at the University of New Hampshire's Dimond Library from 1965 to 2014 where he cataloged DVDs, CDs, and music scores. He donated $4 million to the university in his will, and a scandal later emerged after the university spent a quarter of it on a new football scoreboard.

== Life ==
Morin was born in Nashua, New Hampshire to Louis and Gabrielle Morin. He graduated from the University of New Hampshire (UNH) in Durham in 1961, and earned a master's degree in library science from Simmons College. He then began his career as a librarian at the Dimond Library.

He lived a frugal life, driving an old car, a 1992 Plymouth, and did not go out for entertainment. He regularly ate Fritos with a Coke for breakfast and TV dinners in the evening. He enjoyed reading; Morin read, in chronological order, every book published in the United States between 1930 and 1938, excepting only textbooks, children’s books and cookbooks. He also viewed over 22,000 videos from 1979 to 1997, averaging three videos/movies per day.

A UNH spokesperson said that he smoked a pipe and loved sitting in front of the library talking with students. "He was very committed to the student workers who worked in our main library."

== Bequest ==
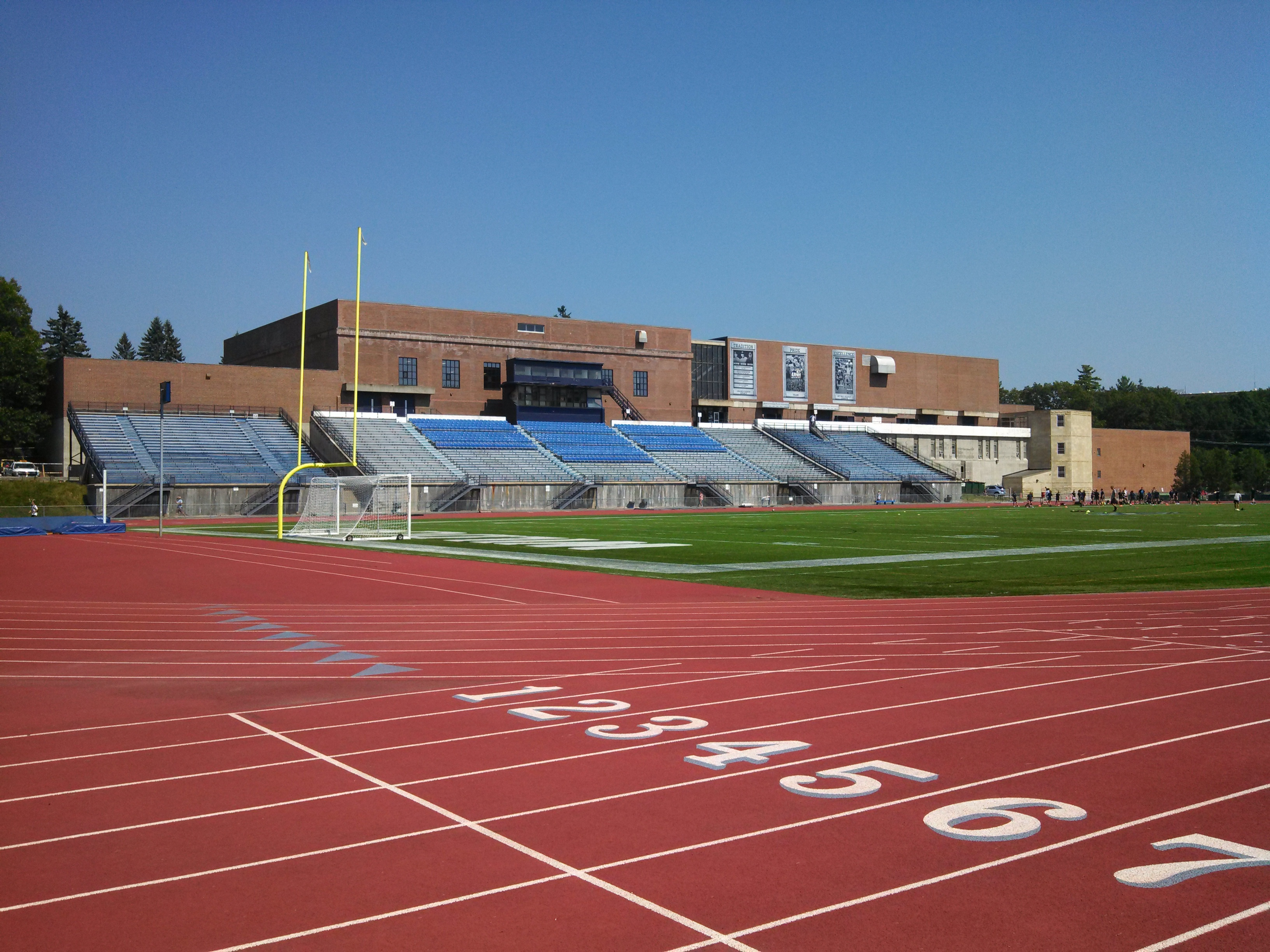
Cowell Stadium

After Morin retired in 2014 he lived in an assisted-living home for 15 months.

His entire estate of $4 million was left to UNH. Most of it was in unrestricted funds, that is, not mandating the University use it to any specific end; Morin dedicated $100,000 for the library and library science scholarships. UNH earmarked $2.5 million to expand its career center, while $1 million was budgeted for a video scoreboard at the campus stadium. Use of the bequest for a video scoreboard drew broad criticism, with one alumna stating "the school’s administrative decision to spend a quarter of Morin’s generous donation on a inconsequential trinket for the athletic department is a complete disgrace to the spirit and memory of Robert Morin." Others drew attention to the absurdity of spending $1 million on a scoreboard when "adjuncts in the English department there... receive $3,000 per class." Administrators defended the decision by saying that the gift was used "for [UNH's] highest priorities and emerging opportunities," and it was pointed out that this was saying to such adjuncts that they "weren’t a high priority."

Advertising revenue from the scoreboard, the administration argued, proved a good return on the investment.

== See also ==
- Albert Lexie
- Ronald Read (philanthropist)
- Dale Schroeder
- Richard Leroy Walters
- Chuck Feeney
- Geoffrey Holt
