= Len Frketich =

American football player (1917–1999)

- Frketich, circa 1940

No. 80, 46, 8
- Position: Tackle

Personal information
- Born: November 18, 1917; Monessen, Pennsylvania, U.S.
- Died: December 9, 1999 (aged 82); Palm Springs, California, U.S.
- Listed height: 6 ft 1 in (1.85 m)
- Listed weight: 290 lb (132 kg)

Career information
- High school: Monessen
- College: Penn State (1938–1940)

Career history
- Pittsburgh Steelers (1945); Akron Bears (1946); Chicago Bears (1947)*; Bloomfield Cardinals (1947)
- * Offseason or practice squad member only
- Stats at Pro Football Reference

Leonard Lawrence Frketich (November 18, 1917 – December 9, 1999) was an American professional football tackle who played for the Pittsburgh Steelers of the National Football League (NFL). He played college football for the Penn State Nittany Lions.

== Early life ==
Leonard Lawrence Frketich was born on November 18, 1917, in Monessen, Pennsylvania. He attended Monessen High School.

== College career ==
Frketich enrolled at Pennsylvania State University to play college football for the Nittany Lions. He was on the freshman team in 1938 and was a two-year varsity letterman from 1939 to 1940. During the summer of 1941, he married and dropped out of school.

== Professional career ==
In 1945, Frketich was the welding rod department foreman at the Monessen Page plant. He signed with the Pittsburgh Steelers for the 1945 NFL season. At 290 pounds, he was the heaviest player on the team. Frketich played in the first two games of the season for the Steelers as a reserve tackle before being released on October 18, 1945.

On September 6, 1946, Frketich signed with the Akron Bears of the American Football League (AFL). The Akron Bears were the farm team of the Chicago Bears. He played in eight games, starting one, for the Bears in 1946.

On August 31, 1947, Frketich was signed by the Chicago Bears. He was waived on September 22, 1947, before the start of the regular season.

Frketich appeared in six games for the AFL's Bloomfield Cardinals in 1947 as a backup guard.

== Personal life ==
Frketich was vice mayor of Chino, California, from 1972 to 1974. He worked as an educator for the California Youth Authority.

Frketich died on December 9, 1999, at an assisted living community in Palm Springs, California. Frketich's son, also named Len Frketich, played college football for the Oregon State Beavers and was selected by the San Francisco 49ers in the 17th round of the 1965 NFL draft.
