= Richard Leroy Walters =

American philanthropist (1931–2007)

- Richard Leroy Walters in 1959
- Born: May 3, 1931
- Died: August 19, 2007 (aged 76); Phoenix, Arizona
- Resting place: Military Cemetery, Phoenix, Arizona
- Education: B.S. Purdue University, 1959; M.A. Ball State University
- Engineering career
- Discipline: Mechanical engineer
- Employer: Allied Signal Aerospace
- Military career
- Allegiance: United States
- Branch: United States Marines
- Conflicts: Korean War

Richard Leroy Walters (May 3, 1931 – August 19, 2007) was a jet propulsion engineer who died homeless in Phoenix, Arizona and left a bequest of $4 million to charities, including National Public Radio and the Mission of Mercy, in Phoenix.

During the Korean War he served in the Marines. According to the 1959 Purdue University yearbook, his hometown was Huntington, Indiana and he was a member of the honorary engineering societies Pi Tau Sigma, Tau Beta Pi, and the American Society of Mechanical Engineers. He earned a bachelor's degree with honors in mechanical engineering from Purdue University in 1959 and a master's degree in teaching from Ball State University. He never married, had no children, and was estranged from his two brothers.

External audio
- Homeless Man Leaves Behind Surprise: $4 Million, 3:34, July 27, 2009, NPR

After 23 years of working at Allied Signal Aerospace he was forced into early retirement, and began living on the streets. While living on the streets, he was always neat and clean and wore a baseball cap and small backpack, but was very reserved and lacked social skills. He did not own a car. Rita Belle, a volunteer nurse with the mission, befriended Walters for nine years and helped him find temporary housing after she learned that he slept behind a local senior center. Nevertheless, he chose to leave the housing after a short time. He used the telephone in the center's billiards room to make his investments, and he completed his own income tax forms.

According to Belle, "He just gave up all of the material things that we think we have to have. You know, I don't know how we gauge happiness. What's happy for you might not be happy for me. I never heard him complain."

During his last years he suffered from severe diabetes and high blood pressure. He had two operations on his legs to improve his circulation, two operations on his eyes, and a quadruple bypass heart operation. After suffering a stroke he contacted Belle, but at first resisted hospitalization because he felt he hadn't benefited from previous medical treatments. In the hospital he suffered another stroke and died.

He was an avowed atheist but converted to Catholicism on his deathbed, with the aid of Belle. He was buried with full military honors at the Military Cemetery in Phoenix. Belle was the executor of the estate, as well as a beneficiary. Several charities received about $400,000 each from the estate, including National Public Radio and the Mission of Mercy. NPR announces on air: "Support for NPR comes from the estate of Richard Leroy Walters, whose life was enriched by NPR, and whose bequest seeks to encourage others to discover public radio."

== See also ==
- Albert Lexie
- Robert Morin (librarian)
- Ronald Read (philanthropist)
- Dale Schroeder
- Chuck Feeney
