= Geoff Holt =

Geoff Holt may refer to:

- Geoff Holt (artist) (1942–1998), British artist
- Geoff Holt (sailor) (born 1966), English sailor
- Geoffrey Holt (philanthropist) (1941–2023), American businessman
