= Ronald Read (philanthropist) =

American philanthropist

- Undated photo of Ronald Read
- Born: October 23, 1921; Dummerston, Vermont, U.S.
- Died: June 2, 2014 (aged 92); Brattleboro, Vermont, U.S.
- Occupations: Gas station attendant; janitor; investor; philanthropist
- Known for: Bequeathing US$6 million to Brattleboro, VT hospital and library

Ronald James Read (October 23, 1921 – June 2, 2014) was an American philanthropist, investor, janitor, and gas station attendant. Read grew up in Dummerston, Vermont, in an impoverished farming household. He walked or hitchhiked 4 mi (6.4 km) daily to his high school and was the first high school graduate in his family. He enlisted in the United States Army during World War II, serving in Italy as a military policeman. Upon an honorable discharge from the military in 1945, Read returned to Brattleboro, Vermont, where he worked as a gas station attendant and mechanic for about 25 years. Read retired for one year and then took a part-time janitor job at J. C. Penney where he worked for 17 years until 1997.

Read died in 2014. He received media coverage in numerous newspapers and magazines after bequeathing US$1.2 million to Brooks Memorial Library and $4.8 million to Brattleboro Memorial Hospital. Read amassed a fortune of almost $8 million by investing in dividend-producing stocks, avoiding the stocks of companies he did not understand such as technology companies, living frugally, and being a buy and hold investor in a diversified portfolio of stocks with a heavy concentration in blue chip companies.

== Early life and career ==
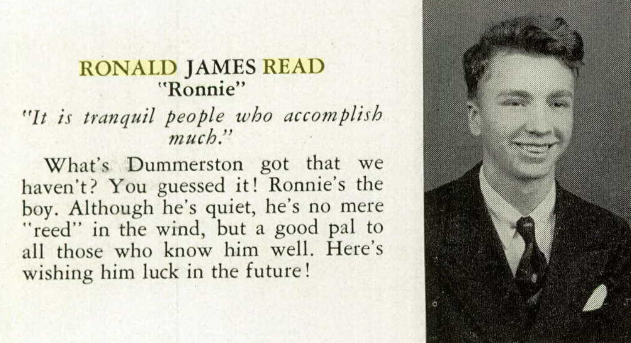
Read in the 1940 Brattleboro High School yearbook

Read was born on October 23, 1921, to George and Florence Ray Read into an indigent family that managed a farm. He was raised in Dummerston, Vermont, in an extremely tiny house. To travel to high school, he daily walked and hitchhiked 4 mi (6.4 km) to Brattleboro. Read graduated from Brattleboro Union High School in 1940 and was the first high school graduate in his family. He had an older brother, Frank. During World War II, he enlisted in the United States Army and was deployed to North Africa, Italy, and the Pacific Ocean theater. In Italy, he worked as a military policeman. He reached the Army rank of technician fifth grade. Right before Christmas 1945, he finished his deployment, was honorably discharged, and traveled back to Brattleboro.

Read worked for almost a quarter of a century as an attendant and mechanic at Haviland's Service Station, a gas station that he and his older brother, Fred, later purchased and then sold upon retiring. He retired in 1979, which lasted a year. He then worked part-time at J. C. Penney where he did custodial and maintenance work before retiring in 1997 after working there for 17 years.

== Personal life ==
Read met his future wife, Barbara March, at Haviland's Service Station when she was a customer and he worked as a gas station attendant. March had two teenaged children, including Phillip Brown, who was in college when Read and March married in 1960. Read purchased for US$12,000 a house where he lived with his wife and stepchildren. He financed his stepchildren's college education. His wife died in 1970 of cancer, and he did not remarry.

Read's hobbies included wood chopping, stamp collecting, and coin collecting. He frequently drove his car to his family's homestead and stored firewood he chopped there, and looked for tree branches on the ground to use for the wood-burning stove at his house. Read frequently patronized Brattleboro Memorial Hospital's coffee shop to drink one cup of coffee and eat a breakfast of an English muffin with peanut butter. After the coffee place shuttered, he began to eat breakfast at Friendly's. Read met the hospital development director, who suggested he check out the library and helped him secure his first library card in 2007. He regularly visited the library to return a pile of books and check out another pile.

== Investing and frugality ==
Reader's Digest's Juliana LaBianca said Read was "a blue-collar guy with blue-chip smarts". The Wall Street Journal noted that his roughly $2,380 purchase of 39 Pacific Gas and Electric Company shares on January 13, 1959, grew to $10,735 by the time he died. Read bought many shares of The J.M. Smucker Company, CVS Health, and Johnson & Johnson and held for long-term several blue chip companies, including Procter & Gamble, JPMorgan Chase, General Electric, and Dow Chemical Company. He focused on companies that paid generous dividends, which he would reinvest into purchasing additional stock. He did not invest in technology companies and the stock du jour because he concentrated largely on companies he knew about. When he died, he had no fewer than 95 stocks that were diversified in many industries such as healthcare, telecommunications, public utilities, rail transport, banks, and consumer goods. Although he owned shares of Lehman Brothers when it went bankrupt in 2008, the bankruptcy minimally affected his returns because his investments were diversified. In a safe deposit box at his bank, Read stored his stock certificates, which when piled together reached five inches high. To remain updated on his investments, he relied on The Wall Street Journal, Barron's, and the public library near him. Read read The Wall Street Journal daily.

His neighbors, family, and friends did not know the scale of the money he had amassed. Read used a safety pin on his fraying khaki denim jacket so he could continue wearing it and put on shabby flannel shirts. Read was a regular at a Friendly's where one time a patron paid for his meal because the patron thought Read could not afford the meal. He owned a used 2007 Toyota Yaris, which Read's lawyer, Laurie Rowell, said despite his being a millionaire, whenever he visited, he parked in the further parking spaces that did not have parking meters.

Writing in The Boston Globe, Nik DeCosta-Klipa called Read "the epitome of Yankee frugality, according to those who knew him". Despite the limited salary from his employment, he was able to amass a substantial fortune through purchasing equities. Barry Ritholtz of The Washington Post praised Read, writing, "How a man of modest means accumulated so much wealth contains exemplary lessons for saving that apply to all of us." He noted that lessons could be learned from Read's experience: "But there is also a cautionary tale about recognizing the value of your finite time here on Earth. Perhaps learning to enjoy life while you can is part of that equation." The Wall Street Journal said, "Besides being a good stock picker, he displayed remarkable frugality and patience—which gave him many years of compounded growth." Referring to Thomas J. Stanley's 1996 book The Millionaire Next Door, Los Angeles Times columnist Michael Hiltzik found Read to be "a Vermont retiree who appeared to be one of Stanley's emblematic secret blue-collar millionaires".

== Death and legacy ==
As Read's health deteriorated, Brattleboro Memorial Hospital attended to him. He died there on June 2, 2014, at 92. Read was a widower, survived by two stepchildren, Philip Brown and Bonnie Brown. His funeral was conducted with military honors, and he was buried at Meeting House Hill Cemetery.

His estate was nearly $8 million, much of which was in shares of stock. He bequeathed $2 million to his stepchildren, caregivers, and friends. He donated $4.8 million to Brattleboro Memorial Hospital and $1.2 million to Brooks Memorial Library, which at the time had a $600,000 budget and a $600,000 endowment, and was affected by the local budget squeeze like other libraries in the state. Both bequests were the largest donations the institutions had received. Read also gave a historic phonograph and a collection of drums to the Dummerston Historical Society. The news of his donations was reported in numerous newspapers and magazines.

A$22.7 million expansion of Brattleboro Memorial Hospital, named the Ronald Read Pavilion and partially funded by Read's donation, was opened in 2022.

== See also ==
- Albert Lexie
- Dale Schroeder
- Richard Leroy Walters
- Robert Morin (librarian)
- Chuck Feeney
- Curt Degerman
- Geoffrey Holt
