= Albert Lexie =

American shoeshiner and philanthropist

Albert Lexie (August 1, 1942 – October 16, 2018) was a shoeshiner from Monessen, Pennsylvania, United States, who was known for his donations to charity.

Lexie worked at the Children's Hospital of Pittsburgh since the early 1980s. As of February 2013, he had donated $200,000 over the course of his career to the Free Care Fund, more than a third of his lifetime salary.

Lexie built himself a shoeshine box while in eighth grade shop class at Monessen High School, the last year he attended school. In June 1999, he was awarded an honorary diploma from Monessen High School.

Lexie was recognized by People magazine's "All-Stars Among Us" program and was honored by People and the Major League Baseball organization at the Major League Baseball All-Star Game in Anaheim, California, on July 13, 2010.

In 2006, he was inducted into the Hall of Fame for Caring Americans by the Caring Institute.

On March 12, 2012, the biography Albert's Kids: The Heroic Work of Shining Shoes for Sick Children (ISBN 143497278X) was published by RoseDog Books and the Children's Hospital of Pittsburgh Foundation.

Lexie died on October 16, 2018, at the age of 76.

== See also ==
- Ronald Read (philanthropist)
- Dale Schroeder
- Richard Leroy Walters
- Chuck Feeney
