= Robert Morin (disambiguation) =

Robert Morin (born 1949) is a Canadian film director, screenwriter, and cinematographer.

Robert Morin may also refer to:

- Robert Morin (librarian) (1938–2015), a librarian at the University of New Hampshire's Dimond Library
- Robert E. Morin (born 1953), the chief judge of the Superior Court of the District of Columbia 1996–2016
