= Brooks Memorial Library =

Public library in Brattleboro Vermont

Coordinates: 42.8553°N 72.55991°W

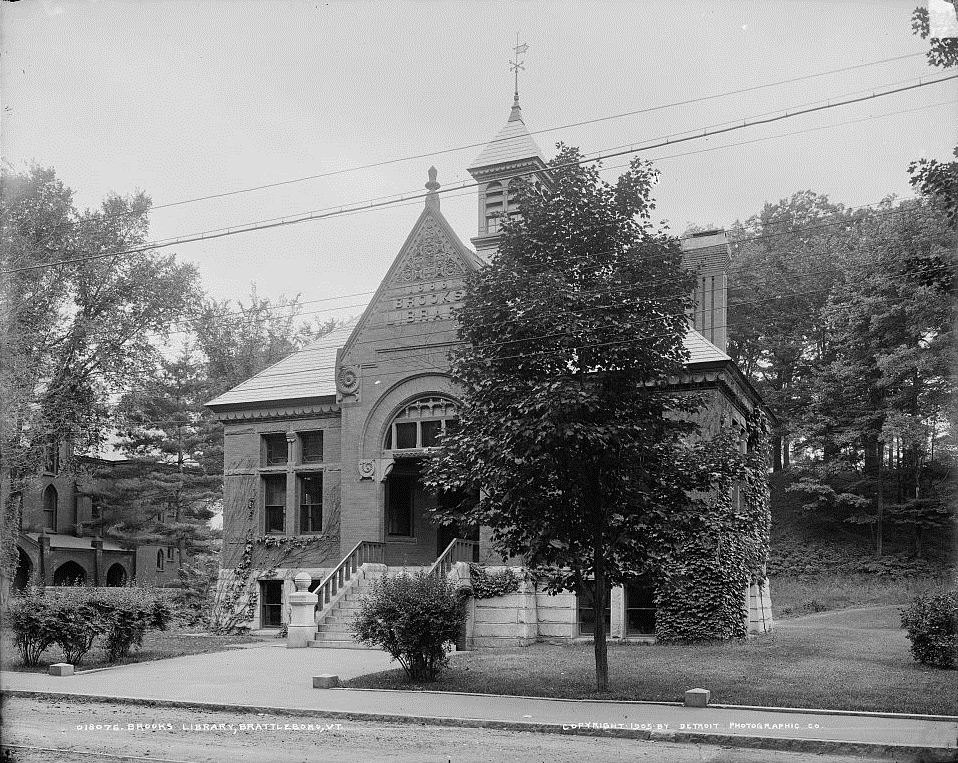
Brooks Library, Brattleboro, Vermont. Detroit Publishing Company, 1905

Brooks Memorial Library is a public library in the municipality of Brattleboro, Vermont. The library was founded in 1887. It is part of the Catamount Library Network, which provides a unified library system for over a dozen Vermont libraries. The current head librarian is Starr LaTronica, who joined the library in December 2015.

== History ==
The library was founded in 1887, when the Brattleboro Library Association's "Free Library" was moved to George J. Brooks Free Library. Brooks was a successful paper wholesale entrepreneur, and upon his return to his hometown founded the library. The library was designed by New England architect Alexander Curtis Currier.

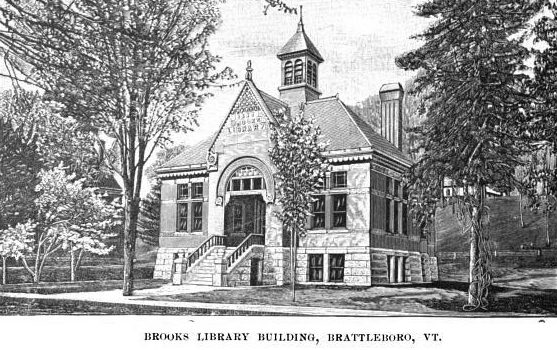
An illustration of the original Brooks Free Library building

The original property was torn down in 1971, when the Brattleboro post office expanded, and the new library was completed in 1967 at its current location. Since then, the library has been funded by a mix of the annual town budget and gifts to the Friends of the Brooks Memorial Library.

The library received national press attention in 2014 when a reclusive and frugal millionaire, Ronald Read, died and left $1.2 million to the library alongside an additional 4.8 million to Brattleboro Memorial Hospital.
