= Nicholas P. Kafkalas =

US Army major general (1920–2013)

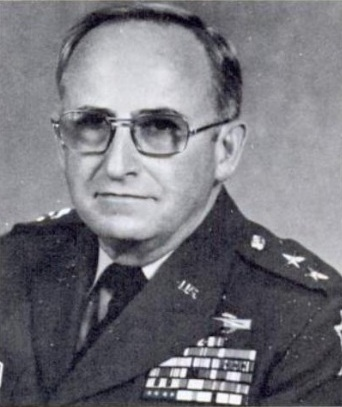
- Kafkalas in 1977
- Born: September 1, 1920; Monessen, Pennsylvania, US
- Died: December 31, 2013 (aged 93); Camp Hill, Pennsylvania, US
- Burial place: Indiantown Gap National Cemetery, Annville Township, Pennsylvania, US
- Alma mater: University of Pittsburgh; United States Army Command and General Staff College; Joint Forces Staff College; United States Army War College
- Spouse: Angeline Croussouloudis (m. 1949–2011)
- Children: 2
- Military career
- Service: United States Army; Pennsylvania National Guard
- Service years: 1939–1980
- Rank: Major General; Lieutenant General (Pennsylvania, retired)
- Service number: 01287540
- Unit: US Army Infantry Branch
- Commands: Company C, 54th Armored Infantry Battalion; Company C, 318th Infantry Regiment; Company D, 110th Infantry Regiment; 3rd Battalion, 110th Infantry Regiment; 28th Infantry Division; Adjutant General of Pennsylvania; Pennsylvania National Guard State Area Command (STARC)
- Conflicts: World War II: Ardennes campaign; Rhineland campaign; Central Europe campaign; Occupation of Germany; Korean War
- Awards: Army Distinguished Service Medal; Silver Star (2); Legion of Merit; Purple Heart; Bronze Star Medal; Complete List

Nicholas P. Kafkalas (1 September 1920 – 31 December 2013) was a career officer in the United States Army. A longtime member of the Pennsylvania National Guard, he was a veteran of World War II and the Korean War. Kafkalas attained the rank of major general and his commands included the 28th Infantry Division (1967 to 1977) and Adjutant General of Pennsylvania from 1977 to 1979. Kafkalas's awards and decorations included the Army Distinguished Service Medal, two awards of the Silver Star, the Legion of Merit, Purple Heart, and Bronze Star Medal.

A native of Monessen, Pennsylvania, Kafkalas graduated from Monessen High School in 1936 and was the proprietor of a confectioner's shop prior to World War II. He enlisted in the National Guard in 1939 and attained the rank of sergeant before his unit was federalized for wartime service. Kafkalas entered active duty with Company C, 110th Infantry Regiment, and remained with the unit until he was selected for attendance at Officer Candidate School. After receiving his commission in July 1942, he commanded Company C, 54th Armored Infantry Battalion during combat in Europe in 1944 and 1945. He took part in the post-war occupation of Germany as commander of Company C, 318th Infantry Regiment.

Upon returning to Pennsylvania, Kafkalas rejoined the National Guard and attended the University of Pittsburgh, from which he graduated in 1949. He worked as a newspaper reporter and editor until entering active duty for service during the Korean War. During the 110th Infantry's service in West Germany, he commanded the regiment's 3rd Battalion. After returning to the United States, in 1954 Kafkalas began a fulltime career with the National Guard and served as the 28th Infantry Division's assistant chief of staff for operations (G-3) and chief of staff. In 1966, Kafkalas received promotion to brigadier general and assignment as the 28th Division's assistant division commander. In 1967, he was appointed to command the division, and he was promoted to major general in 1968. Kafkalas commanded the division until 1977, and concurrently served as Pennsylvania's deputy adjutant general from 1968 to 1972.

In 1977, Kafkalas was appointed Adjutant General of Pennsylvania. He served until 1979, when he was assigned as director of the Pennsylvania National Guard State Area Command (STARC). Kafkalas retired upon reaching the mandatory retirement age of 60 in 1980. He was director of the state Veteran's Outreach and Assistance Center until retiring in 1993, after which he resided in Camp Hill. He died in Camp Hill on 31 December 2013 and was buried at Indiantown Gap National Cemetery.

== Early life ==
Nicholas Peter Kafkalas was born in Monessen, Pennsylvania, on 1 September 1920, the son of Peter Kafkalas and Pearl (Burk) Kafkalas. He was raised and educated in Monessen, and was a 1936 graduate of Monessen High School. After high school, Kafkalas was the proprietor of a Monessen confectioner's shop.

On 6 March 1939, Kafkalas began a military career when he enlisted as a private in Company D, 110th Infantry Regiment, a unit of the Pennsylvania National Guard. He advanced through the ranks to sergeant, and went on active duty for World War II when his unit was mobilized on 17 February 1941.

== Start of career ==
Kafkalas was undergoing pre-deployment training with the 110th Infantry at Camp Livingston, Louisiana when he was selected for attendance at Officer Candidate School at Fort Benning, Georgia. He graduated from OCS in July 1942 and received his commission as a second lieutenant of Infantry. He was then assigned to the 54th Armored Infantry Battalion, a unit of the 10th Armored Division. Kafkalas served successively as a platoon leader and assistant operations officer (S-3) before assignment as commander of the battalion's Company C. He was promoted to first lieutenant in November 1943 and captain in June 1944.

Kafkalas was in command of Company C when the 10th Armored Division landed in France in September 1944. He led his unit during combat in Europe throughout late 1944 and early 1945, including the Ardennes campaign, Rhineland campaign, and Central Europe campaign. He remained in Germany during the Occupation of Germany and commanded Company C, 318th Infantry Regiment, a unit of the 80th Infantry Division. During his wartime service, Kafkalas received two awards of the Silver Star for heroism, the Bronze Star Medal, the Purple Heart, and the Combat Infantryman Badge.

== Continued career ==
After his Second World War service, Kafkalas rejoined the Pennsylvania National Guard as commander of Company D, 110th Infantry. He also began attendance at the University of Pittsburgh, from which he received a Bachelor of Science degree in political science in 1949. Kafkalas also pursued a career in journalism as a reporter and city editor for the Monessen Daily Independent newspaper. In 1949, he married Angeline "Angie" Croussouloudis of Monessen. They were married until her death in 2011 and were the parents of a daughter, Ellen, and a son, Peter.

In 1950, the 28th Infantry Division was activated for federal service during the Korean War, and Kafkalas received promotion to major and assignment as operations officer (S-3) of the 110th Infantry Regiment. The 28th Division was posted to West Germany during its wartime service, and while in Europe Kafkalas was appointed to command the 110th Infantry's 3rd Battalion. After his command assignment, Kafkalas was appointed assistant operations officer (G-3) on the 28th Infantry Division staff. the 28th Infantry Division was released from wartime service in December 1953, and Kafkalas returned to Pennsylvania.

Upon returning to the United States, Kafkalas moved to Harrisburg to become a fulltime employee of the Pennsylvania National Guard and was assigned as operations officer (G-3) on the staff of the 28th Infantry Division. He was promoted to lieutenant colonel in January 1954, and he served as the 28th Division's G-3 until 1960. In July 1960, Kafkalas was assigned as the 28th Division's chief of staff, and he was promoted to colonel in September. He continued to serve as the division chief of staff until 1966.

== Later career ==
In July 1966, Kafkalas was assigned as assistant division commander (ADC), and he was promoted to brigadier general in November. He continued to serve as ADC until April 1967, when he was assigned as the division commander. Kafkalas was promoted to major general in December 1968. From July 1968 to May 1972, Kafkalas served as Pennsylvania's deputy adjutant general, an assignment he carried out while continuing to command the 28th Division. During extensive flooding in Pennsylvania during 1972, the National Guard was activated to provide disaster relief. Kafkalas commanded "Task Force Wyoming Valley", which was headquartered in Wilkes-Barre.

In March 1977, Kafkalas was appointed Adjutant General of Pennsylvania and he relinquished command of the 28th Division in May. He served as adjutant general until May 1979, when he was appointed as director of the Pennsylvania National Guard State Area Command (STARC). Kafkalas held this position until retiring from the National Guard in September 1980. At his retirement, Kafkalas received the Army Distinguished Service Medal, and he was promoted to lieutenant general on Pennsylvania's retired list.

=== Military education ===
In addition to Officer Candidate School, Kafkalas was a 1951 graduate of the Infantry Officer Advanced Course. He graduated from the United States Army Command and General Staff College in 1955, and he completed annual refresher courses every year from 1954 to 1972. In 1956, he completed a course on special weapons and guided missiles, and in 1961 he graduated from the Chemical, Biological, and Radiological Weapons Course. He graduated from the Armed Forces Staff College in 1962. In 1967, Kafkalas graduated from the United States Army War College. In 1969, he completed the Army Preventive Maintenance Course, and in 1972 he completed the Senior Reserve Component Officer Course at the Army War College.

== Retirement and death ==
After leaving the military, Kafkalas was director of the state the Veteran's Outreach and Assistance Center until retiring in 1993. In retirement, Kafkalas was a resident of Camp Hill, Pennsylvania. His activities included president of the council for his Greek Orthodox church and member of the Order of the American Hellenic Educational Progressive Association. He also volunteered at the Army Heritage Center in Carlisle and participated in a monthly American Civil War round table meeting.

Kafkalas was a member of the National Guard Association of the United States, Veterans of Foreign Wars, American Legion, Association of the United States Army, National Guard Association of Pennsylvania, and Society of the 28th Infantry Division. Kafkalas died in Camp Hill on 31 December 2013. He was buried at Indiantown Gap National Cemetery in Annville.

== Awards ==
=== Federal ===
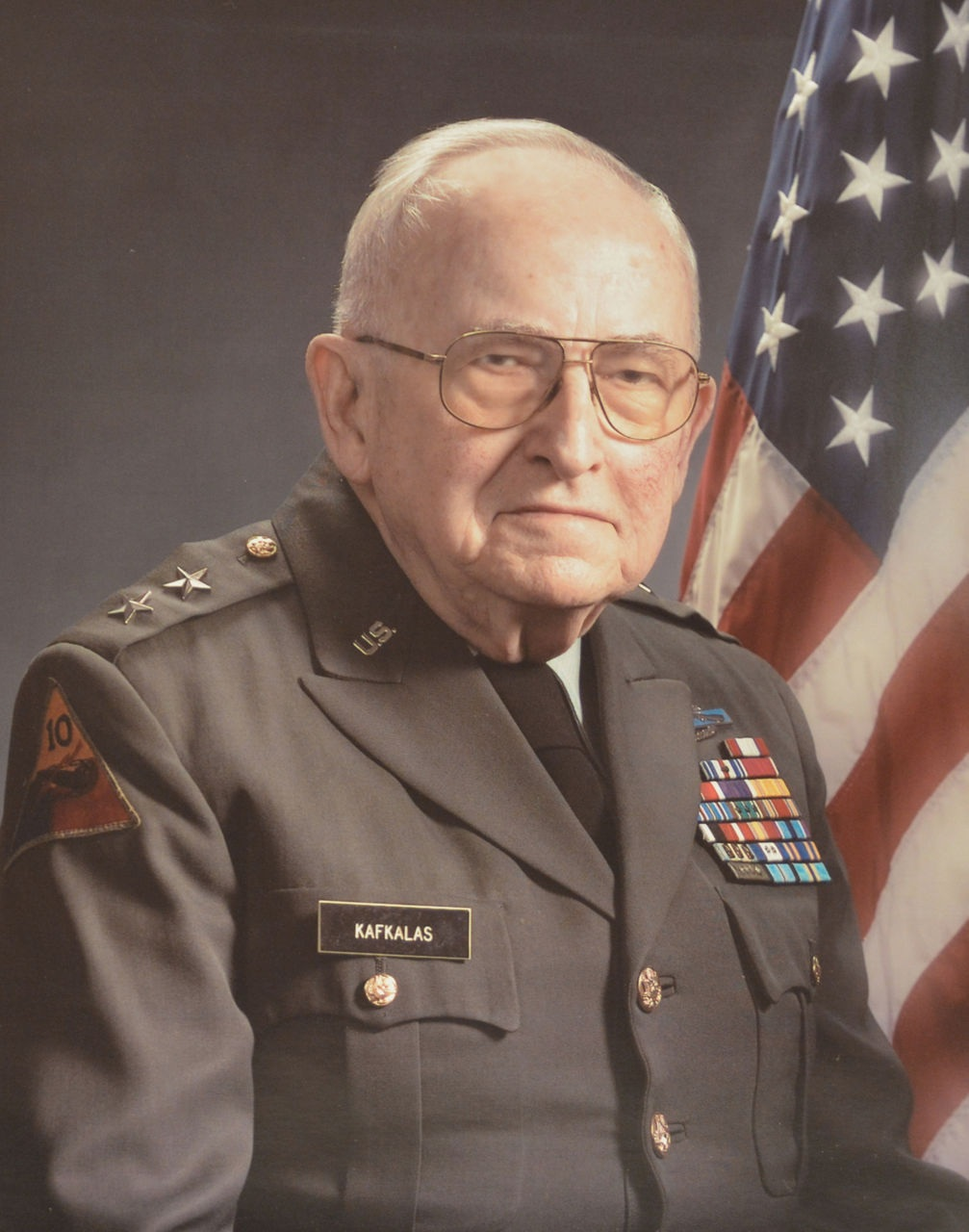
Kafkalas in 1998. As depicted on the Pennsylvania DMVA Hall of Fame website.

Among Kafkalas's federal awards were:

- Army Distinguished Service Medal
- Silver Star with oak leaf cluster
- Legion of Merit
- Purple Heart
- Bronze Star Medal
- American Defense Service Medal
- American Campaign Medal
- European–African–Middle Eastern Campaign Medal with three bronze service stars
- Army of Occupation Medal
- National Defense Service Medal
- Humanitarian Service Medal
- Armed Forces Reserve Medal with three bronze hourglasses
- Army Overseas Service Ribbon
- Combat Infantryman Badge

=== State ===
Kafkalas's state awards included:

- Pennsylvania Distinguished Service Medal with two bronze service stars
- Pennsylvania Service Ribbon
- Pennsylvania 20 Year Medal with two service stars
- Pennsylvania MG Thomas. R. White Medal
- Maryland Distinguished Service Cross

=== Other honors ===
In 1972, Kafkalas was inducted into the U.S. Army Officer Candidate School Alumni Foundation's Hall of Fame. In 1976, he received the Distinguished Service Medal of the National Guard Association of the United States. In 1998, he was inducted into the Pennsylvania Department of Military and Veterans Affairs Hall of Fame.

== Dates of rank ==
Kafkalas's dates of rank were:

- Private to sergeant, 6 March 1939 to 13 July 1942
- Second Lieutenant, 14 July 1942
- First Lieutenant, 15 November 1943
- Captain, 6 June 1944
- Major, 26 October 1950
- Lieutenant Colonel, 21 January 1954
- Colonel, 26 September 1960
- Brigadier General, 7 November 1966
- Major General, 10 December 1968
- Major General (Retired), 1 September 1980
- Lieutenant General (Pennsylvania retired list), 1 September 1980
