= Monessen City School District =

School district in Pennsylvania

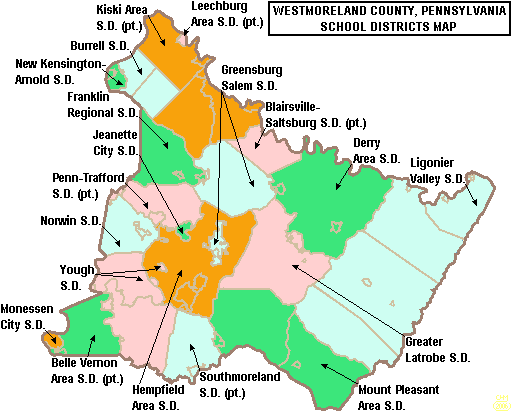

Address
- 1275 Rostraver Street Monessen, Westmoreland County, Pennsylvania, 15062-2049; United States

District information
- Type: Public
- Grades: K-12

Students and staff
- Athletic conference: Western Pennsylvania Interscholastic Athletic League
- District mascot: Greyhounds
- Colors: Black and white

Other information
- Website: www.monessenschooldistrict.com

Monessen City School District is a tiny, urban, public school district operating in southwestern Westmoreland County, Pennsylvania. It serves the city of Monessen, Pennsylvania. The School District of the City of Monessen encompasses approximately 2 square miles (5.2 km^{2}). According to 2000 federal census data, it serves a resident population of 8,670. In 2010, the population of the district had decline to 7,717 people. In 2009, the District residents’ per capita income was $16,627, while the median family income was $37,269. In the Commonwealth, the median family income was $49,501 and the United States median family income was $49,445, in 2010. By 2013, the median household income in the United States rose to $52,100.

School District of the City of Monessen operates three schools: Monessen Elementary Center (K–5), Monessen High School (6–12). The middle school and high school share a single building. The District uses the Westmoreland Intermediate Unit No. 7 for services to special education students and faculty training.

== Extracurriculars ==
The district offers a wide variety of clubs, activities and an extensive sports program.

=== Sports ===
The District funds:

Varsity

Boys

- Baseball – A
- Basketball – A Varsity and JV teams
- Football – A Varsity & JV
- Soccer – A Varsity & JV
- Track and Field – AA

Girls

- Basketball – A Varsity & JV
- Cheerleading Varsity & JV
- Soccer (Fall) – A Varsity & JV
- Softball – A
- Track and Field – AA

Middle School Sports

Boys

- Basketball
- Football
- Soccer

Girls

- Basketball
- Soccer (Fall)
- Softball

According to PIAA directory July 2013
