= Monessen High School =

Coordinates: 40.13954°N 79.86989°W

Location
- 1245 State Road; Monessen, Pennsylvania 15062; United States

Information
- Type: Public high school
- School district: Monessen City School District
- Principal: Eric Manko
- Teaching staff: 15.14 (FTE)
- Grades: 9-12
- Enrollment: 179 (2023–2024)
- Student to teacher ratio: 11.82
- Colors: Black; White
- Team name: Greyhounds
- Yearbook: The Greyhound
- Website: mshs.monessenschooldistrict.com

Monessen High School is a high school located in Monessen, Pennsylvania. It is part of the Monessen City School District and is the only high school within the city of Monessen.

The school colors are black and white. The official high school mascot is the Greyhound, and their yearbook is similarly named The Greyhound.

In 2013 the Pennsylvania Department of Education published a list of schools that achieved the lowest 15 percentile of standardized test scores for the 2011–2012 school year, including Monessen High School.

== Notable alumni ==
- Charel Allen, former WNBA player
- Christian B. Anfinsen, chemist who won the Nobel Prize in 1972
- Julius Dawkins, NFL football player
- Nicholas P. Kafkalas, US Army major general
- Albert Lexie, shoeshiner who gave away a third of his lifetime income to charity
- Frances McDormand, actress, known for her performance as Marge Gunderson in Fargo
- Michael Moorer, boxer
