= Brattleboro Union High School =

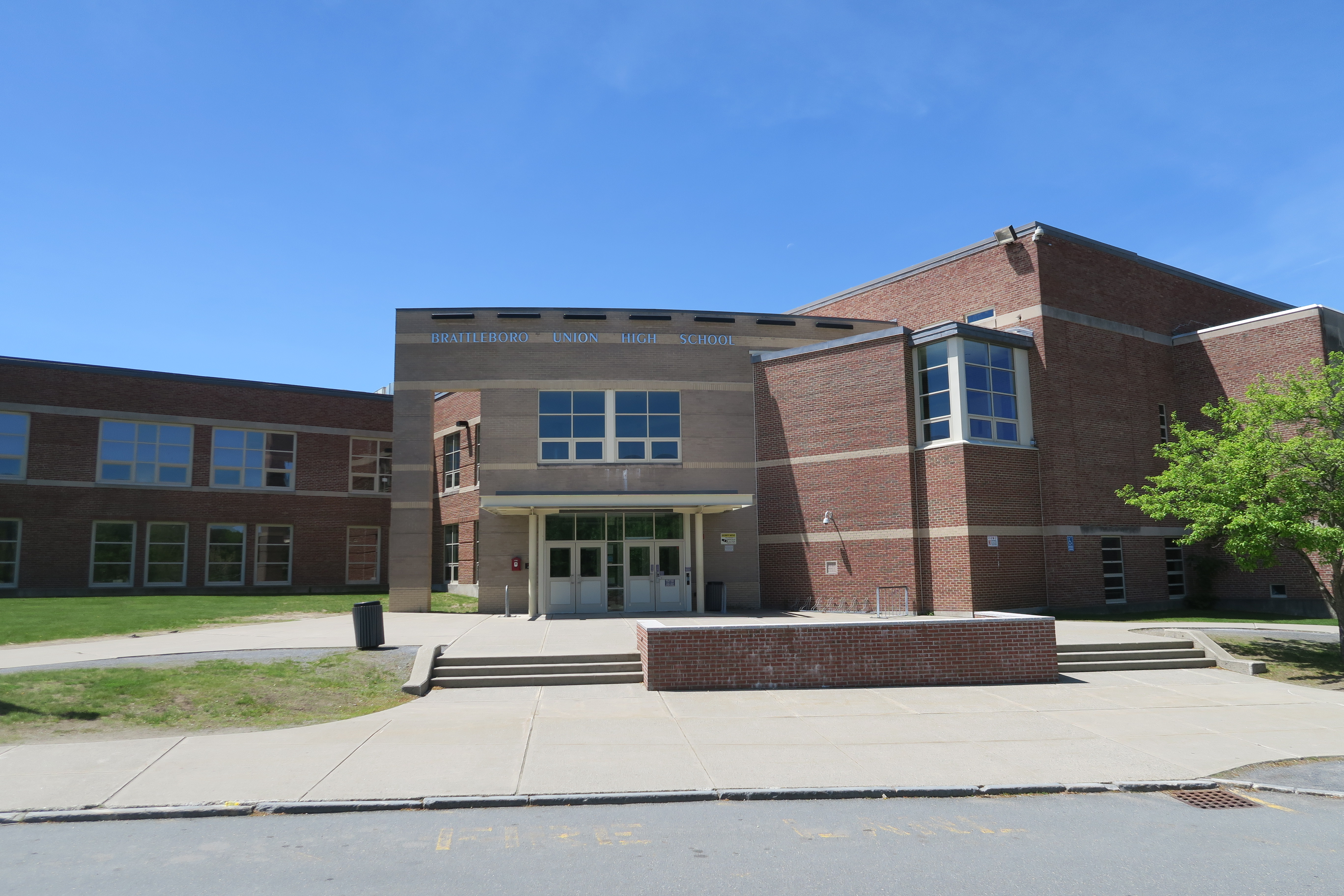
- Brattleboro Union High School

Location
- 131 Fairground Road, Brattleboro, VT 05301
- Coordinates: 42.836762°N 72.561522°W

Information
- Type: Public high school
- School district: Windham Southeast School District
- Superintendent: Mark Speno
- CEEB code: 460055
- NCES School ID: 500043100051
- Principal: Hannah Parker
- Teaching staff: 78.57 (FTE)
- Grades: 9-12
- Enrollment: 705 (2024-2025)
- Student to teacher ratio: 8.97
- Colors: Purple and White
- Team name: Bears
- Accreditation: New England Association of Schools and Colleges
- Supervisory Union: Windham Southeast Supervisory Union
- Website: http://buhs.wsesdvt.org/

Brattleboro Union High School (BUHS) is a public school in Vermont that serves the towns of Brattleboro, Vernon, Guilford, Dummerston, and Putney. The Brattleboro Union High School is connected with the middle school, Brattleboro Area Middle School (BAMS).

== History ==
The school began in 1831 and was incorporated by the Vermont Legislature in November, 1832. It was originally a private enterprise led by prominent community members John Holbrook and John Dickerman. The original building was made out of wood and was in a separate area of Brattleboro from where it is currently. The wooden high school was used for grades beyond the primary grades.

The new Brattleboro’ High School in the East Village competed with the private Brattleboro Academy of the West Village. The Academy was established in 1801 and served the area’s secondary education needs for two decades. These two private high schools mirrored the growth and competition that existed between the East and West Villages during the 1800s. Initially, the West Village had the upper hand but as the Connecticut River continued to support trade in the first half of the 1800s, and the railroad along the river grew during the second half of the century, the East Village emerged as the dominant population center.

In 1842 Brattleboro’ High School was sold to the East Village school district. Meanwhile, West Brattleboro’s Academy received a facelift with the goal of attracting secondary students from a twenty-mile radius. The intent was to offer an education that would support the training of future teachers, those wanting to pursue “surveying or mercantile life”, and students preparing for “a collegiate course”

The East Village converted the Brattleboro High School building into a public school that served primary, intermediate and high school students. By the 1860s, the idea of a public high school took hold. Prior to this many people felt high school was reserved for the wealthy and/or the gifted. The switch to public school meant that kids with less money could go to school there and have the opportunity to learn. The population of the East Village had also grown and additions were built on the north and south sides of the old high school to accommodate more students.

A public school year in the East Village consisted of three sessions of twelve weeks each. Students needed to successfully complete an exam to pass on to the high school. Meanwhile, the West Village Academy continued to operate as a private school but struggled to raise funds during the 1850’s and 60’s.

In 1864 the Vermont Legislature made landowners pay school taxes regardless of whether or not they had children in public school. Towns had multiple school districts that often followed neighborhood lines. In the 1860’s Vermont had more than 2,500 school districts...an average of ten per town. The vast majority of these districts were one room school houses that offered a primary and intermediate education.

George Aiken graduated from the school in 1909. Facing increasing enrollment in the late 1940s the town moved to establish a new high school to serve area towns that would be equipped with modern facilities and safety features as well as plenty of space for sport related activities, something desperately unavailable at the then downtown location.

In the early 1950s the decision was made to build the new high school on the "Old Fairgrounds" in the southern section of town. The students moved into the new school in the school year of 1951 and 1952.

Over the years a number of additions were built to deal with increasing enrollment. In the 1960s, a junior high school was added to the campus, and in the mid-1970s, a career center was added for technical education. The decision was made in the early 2000s to renovate the high school.

The project would come to be the largest and most expensive high school renovation in the state's history. $56 million was dedicated to a complete, down to the walls renovation, of the campus that now serves around 1200 students. Completed in 2007, the renovation has brought many modern features to the school community as well as increasing energy efficiency and accommodating a growing number of students. In addition, steps were taken to preserve key historical features in the original section of the school, such as wood paneling and certain light fixtures. The original building is currently listed on the National Register of Historic Places.

The BUHS Band led by Stephen Rice was chosen to represent Vermont in the 2009 Presidential Inauguration parade for Barack Obama.

== Sexual misconduct allegations, investigation ==
In August 2021, an alumna published an article "No More Secrecy" in The Commons, a local newspaper, telling of her experience with Robert "Zeke" Hecker, an English teacher at the school from 1971-2004 and volunteer chaperone from 2004-2009, and detailing multiple investigations into his conduct with minors over the decades. The article quoted from police interviews with colleagues and supervisors who admitted to suspicions of misconduct by Hecker but never intervened or reported them. The police report included references to two alleged survivors: one who said she was abused by Hecker between 1977-1978, beginning when she was 16, and another 16 year-old who reported "an affair" with Hecker in 1985 but recanted when questioned by police with administrators present. It also quoted from a letter logged by the police, in which Hecker referred to himself as a "child molester" and admitted his attraction to "school girls."

The following week The Commons published Hecker's apology.

In September 2021, following presentation of a letter signed by more than 180 alumni and members of the community and the surfacing of more allegations of misconduct by Hecker and others, the Windham Southeast School District (WSESD) board of directors promised "We're not gonna sweep anything under the rug." In December 2021, the WSESD announced its intent to open an "independent investigation." In January 2022, the WSESD hired Attorney Aimee Goddard to conduct the investigation. In February 2022, the district opened the investigation. Over the ensuing two years, the WSESD encouraged survivors or witnesses of sexual abuse or other abuses of power in their schools to come forward and report to Attorney Goddard. For two years, they alluded to the release of a "report" when the investigation concluded.

In September 2022, the WSESD was notified of at least two possible lawsuits, alleging misconduct by Hecker, his wife, and former elementary teacher Thomas Haskins.

In October 2022, the principal of BUHS was fired as a result of reports received by Goddard. The principal later filed a lawsuit against the district, alleging wrongful termination. His lawyer claimed he had been made "a scapegoat" and a "sacrificial lamb."

At a WSESD board of directors' meeting in January 2024, Kelly Young, board chair, declared that Attorney Goddard had concluded an investigation that was "privileged and confidential." She said the district would likely make no further comment on the findings. At that time, Massachusetts law firm Justice Law Collaborative was representing five clients with allegations against the district.

== Notable alumni ==
- George Aiken, 64th governor of Vermont and member of the United States Senate
- Ronald Read, American philanthropist, investor, janitor, and gas station attendant
- Tristan Toleno, chef, businessman, and member of the Vermont House of Representatives
- Joseph Weisenthal, journalist, television presenter and podcaster
- Jody Williams, 1997 Nobel Peace Prize recipient, founder of the International Campaign to Ban Landmines
