= Charleroi–Monessen Bridge =

Bridge in Pennsylvania, United States

John K. Tener Memorial Bridge
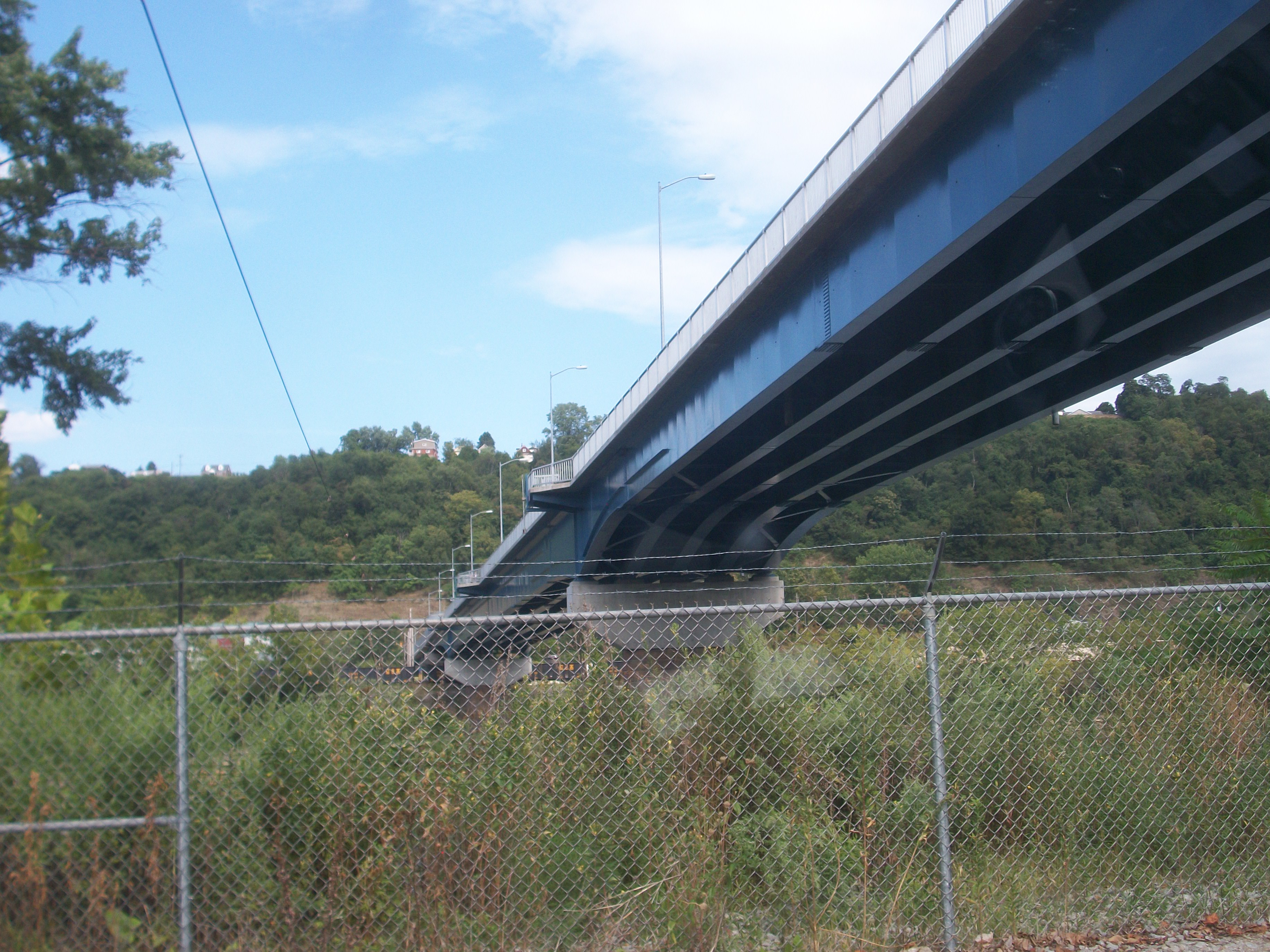
- Coordinates: 40°09′07″N 79°54′14″W

History
- Replaces: Charleroi–Monessen Bridge

Location
- Interactive map of John K. Tener Memorial Bridge

The Charleroi–Monessen Bridge, officially the John K. Tener Memorial Bridge, is a two lane structure spanning the Monongahela River. The bridge connects North Charleroi in Washington County, Pennsylvania, and Monessen in Westmoreland County, Pennsylvania. The structure connects Route 88 on the west bank of the river and Route 906 on the east side. The bridge, which opened in 2013, replaced a 1906 structure. The original bridge closed in 2009 due to structural deficiency.

== Previous bridge ==
- Charleroi-Monessen Bridge
- U.S. National Register of Historic Places
- Washington County History & Landmarks Foundation Landmark
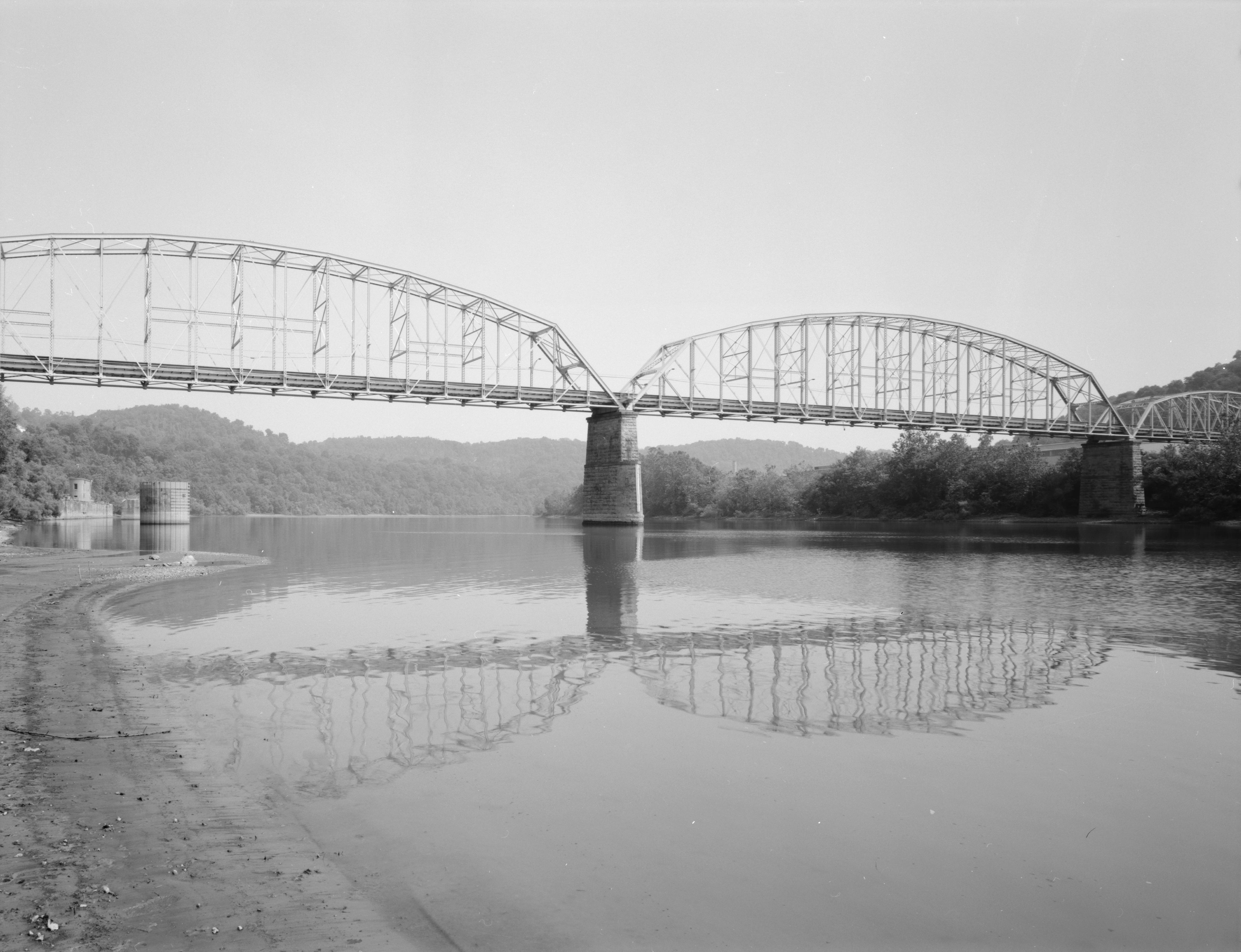
- The original Charleroi-Monessen Bridge in Summer 1997

- Location within Pennsylvania Location within the United States
- Location: LR 247 over Monongahela River, Monessen, Pennsylvania
- Coordinates: 40°9′6″N 79°54′15″W
- Area: less than one acre
- Built: 1906
- Architect: Emil Swensson; Mercantile Bridge Co.
- Architectural style: Multiple span PA truss
- MPS: Highway Bridges Owned by the Commonwealth of Pennsylvania, Department of Transportation TR
- NRHP reference No.: 88000812
- Added to NRHP: June 22, 1988

The 1906 bridge, a three-span steel truss structure, was imploded shortly before 9:00 a.m. on Monday, July 11, 2011. The new bridge was constructed in its place slightly to the northeast.

The 1906 bridge was designated as a historic bridge by the Washington County History & Landmarks Foundation.

== Current bridge ==
Construction delays caused the original December 2012 projected opening date to be pushed back to June 29, 2013. The Pennsylvania Legislature voted to name the new bridge after Mon Valley native John Tener, a former U.S. Representative and state governor. Tener, an ex-professional baseball player who organized the first congressional baseball game, owned the Mercantile Bridge Company, which designed the original bridge that connected the two cities. .

== See also ==
- List of bridges documented by the Historic American Engineering Record in Pennsylvania
- List of crossings of the Monongahela River
