= Sylvia Bloom =

American legal secretary and philanthropist

- Born: 1919 or 1920; Brooklyn, New York, U.S.
- Died: 2016 (aged 96); New York City, U.S.
- Education: Hunter College
- Occupations: Legal secretary; philanthropist
- Employer: Cleary Gottlieb
- Known for: Bequeathed US$8.2 million for college scholarships
- Spouse: Raymond Margolies (died 2002)

Sylvia Bloom (c. 1919 – 2016) was an American legal secretary. By copying her bosses' investment decisions she secretly accumulated a significant fortune and donated the bulk of it—US$8.2 million—for scholarships for underprivileged students upon her death. She lived modestly in a rent-controlled apartment, and even her closest friends and family did not know about her wealth.

Bloom's story garnered widespread acclaim, shedding light on other unassuming individuals amassing substantial wealth and donating to local causes upon their death. Her financial success showcased the potential of long-term investing. However, debate arose over the legal and ethical issues in her investment method, citing potential misuse of confidential client data. Other critics argued for prioritizing intentional generosity and impact during one's lifetime rather than solely through inheritance.

== Biography ==
Sylvia Bloom was born in Brooklyn, New York, around 1919, to Eastern European immigrants. She grew up during the Great Depression, attended public schools, and worked days while studying at Hunter College at night to earn her degree. Paul Hyams, a human resources executive at her future firm, said that Bloom regretted never going to law school.

On February 24, 1947, Bloom joined the new Wall Street law firm of Cleary, Gottlieb, Friendly, & Cox as a secretary to Fowler Hamilton, (Note: Cleary Gottlieb claimed Bloom was hired at the company in 1947, while Bloom's niece Jane Lockshin said it was in 1948.) becoming the firm's employee number three. She stayed there till her retirement in 2016. As a secretary, Bloom not only ran her bosses' business but also managed their personal investments. She started quietly investing in the same stocks as the firm's lawyers: when her boss bought stocks, she did the same with her smaller salary. With time, her investments grew into a multi-million-dollar fortune.

Bloom kept her investments solely in her name despite being married to Raymond Margolies until his death in 2002. They had no children. For decades they lived in a rent-controlled apartment, and even her closest friends and family were unaware of her substantial wealth accumulated over the years. Her niece, however, described her aunt as leading a modest yet not deprived life: she toured Europe, frequented Las Vegas due to her husband's love for gambling, and wore smart, custom-made clothing to work. (Note: See the transcript of the CBC episode.) Bloom retired at the age of 96 and moved to a senior residence mainly because she "wanted to find a good bridge game", said Flora Mogul Bornstein, Bloom's cousin.

Bloom died in 2016 at the age of 96. In her will, her niece Jane Lockshin was named as the executor of her more than US$9 million estate. The will allocated some money for relatives and friends but directed the bulk of the fortune for scholarships for underprivileged students, to be chosen by Lockshin. In 2018, Lockshin announced the $6.24 million gift to the Henry Street Settlement on the Lower East Side; this gift was used to create the Bloom-Margolies Scholarship Fund under their Expanded Horizons College Success Program. Another $2 million was split between Hunter College, Bloom's alma mater, and another scholarship fund not yet announced as of May 2018.

== Legacy ==
The story about Bloom was named one of The New York Times's five "best and most popular stories" of 2018, and The Week's "one of the most heartwarming stories from the 2010s". Her story inspired a newfound interest in the lives of other low-profile, unassuming individuals, usually living on a salary, who quietly amassed multi-million-dollar fortunes that nobody could have imagined they possessed and then donated it to local causes upon their deaths.

The Motley Fool's Selena Maranjian said that investing in broad-market index funds over time, even with an average income, can lead to significant wealth accumulation. She said that the growth of Bloom's wealth showcased the power of time in growing savings. On the other hand, Entrepreneur's Peter Page said that Bloom's financial success relied on factors that used to be common but are now rare. Mimicking her hard work and frugality is possible, but finding guaranteed low-cost housing, debt-free education, secure full-time jobs with benefits and pensions is much harder nowadays.

C&M Inversores outlined a way to execute Bloom's coattail (copycat) investing without any need for insider information, using the fact that major US investors must publicly disclose their trades every three months. This data becomes available for free to individual investors, enabling them to mimic the moves of a chosen "buy and hold" celebrity investor. However, Bloom's coattail investing approach raises concerns about its legality, as at least one lawyer at her firm pleaded guilty to insider trading by misusing confidential client information. Bloom's strategy of mimicking her bosses' trades presents legal and ethical uncertainties.

Some authors recommend to learn from successful investors like Bloom who lived the lives of "almost comic frugality", but not to become them. They say that those who make a fortune should spend, invest, and share it generously during their lifetime, rather than leaving a sizable inheritance. Bill Perkins said in his book Die With Zero that being generous after death is not true generosity. Being intentional about when and how much to give can have a more meaningful impact on the loved ones and causes important to the benefactor.

== See also ==
- Geoffrey Holt
