= North Charleroi, Pennsylvania =

Borough in Pennsylvania, US

North Charleroi
- Borough
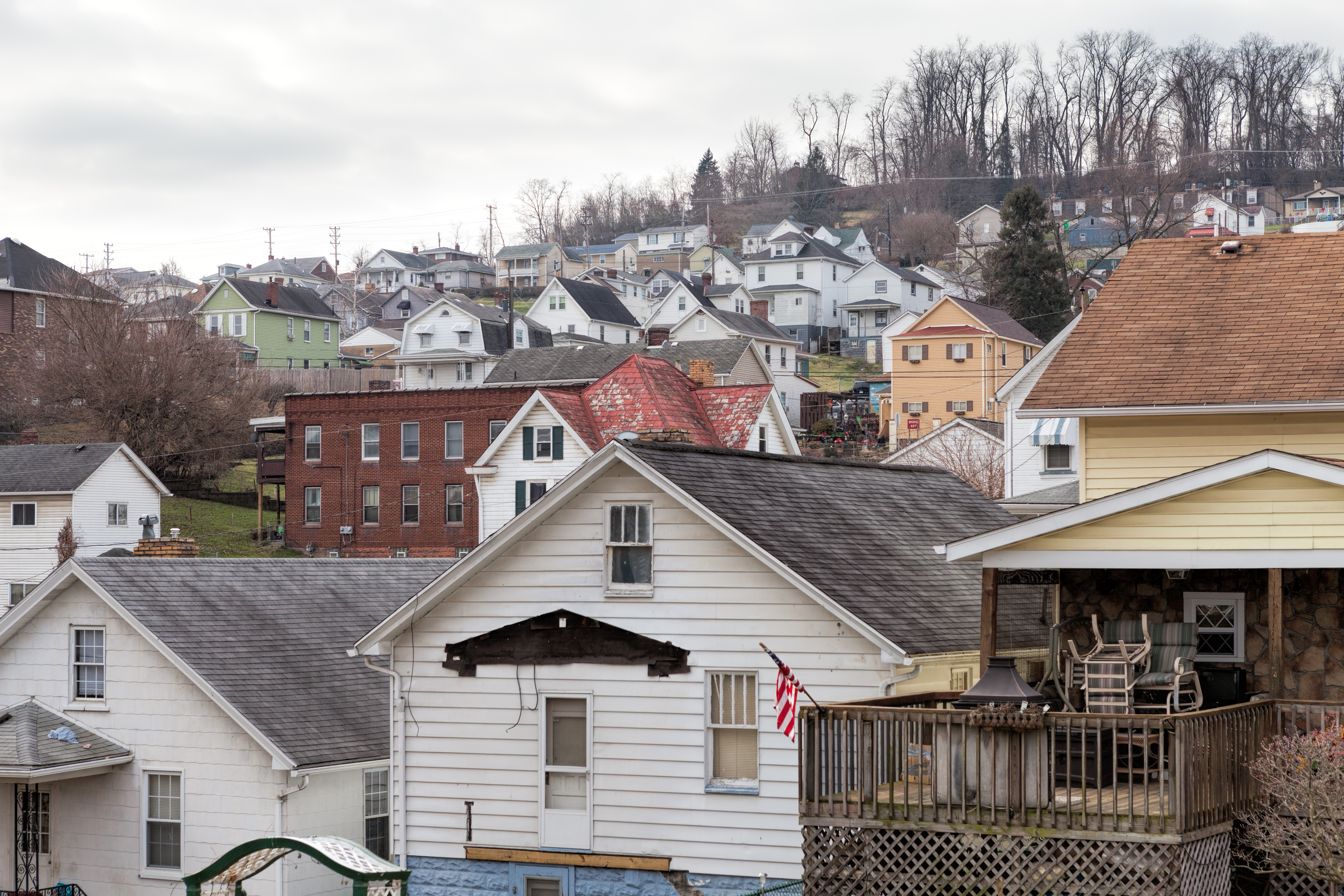
- Looking southwest up the hill across much of the town from the south end of Olive Ave
- Etymology: Charleroi, Belgium
- Nickname: Lock 4
- Location of North Charleroi in Washington County, Pennsylvania.

- Location of North Charleroi in Pennsylvania
- Coordinates: 40°9′3″N 79°54′34″W
- Country: United States
- State: Pennsylvania
- County: Washington
- Established: 1885

Government
  - Mayor: Steve Hega

Area
  - Total: 0.29 sq mi (0.76 km^{2})
  - Land: 0.26 sq mi (0.67 km^{2})
  - Water: 0.039 sq mi (0.10 km^{2})

Population (2020)
  - Total: 1,303
  - Density: 5,069.8/sq mi (1,957.45/km^{2})
- Time zone: UTC-4 (EST)
  - Summer (DST): UTC-5 (EDT)
- ZIP code: 15022
- Area code: 724
- FIPS code: 42-54888
- Website: http://northcharleroiboro.org/

North Charleroi is a borough in Washington County, Pennsylvania, United States. The population was 1,302 at the 2020 census.

The settlement is also known as "Lock 4". Previously Lock and Dam #4 was located on this side of the Monongahela River, and the place had this name. Lock and Dam #4 was later relocated further upstream on the other side of the "Charleroi Monessen Bridge". The name was changed but most residents still refer to the town as "Lock 4".

== History ==
The Charleroi-Monessen Bridge was listed on the National Register of Historic Places in 1988.

== Geography ==
North Charleroi is located at 40°9′3″N 79°54′34″W (40.150927, −79.909365).

According to the United States Census Bureau, the borough has a total area of 0.3 square miles (0.78 km^{2}), of which 0.3 square miles (0.78 km^{2}) is land and 0.04 square miles (0.10 km^{2}) (10.00%) is water.

== Demographics ==
Historical population
Census	Pop.	Note	%±
1900	425		—
1910	1,008		137.2%
1920	1,931		91.6%
1930	2,879		49.1%
1940	2,674		−7.1%
1950	2,554		−4.5%
1960	2,259		−11.6%
1970	1,964		−13.1%
1980	1,760		−10.4%
1990	1,562		−11.2%
2000	1,409		−9.8%
2010	1,313		−6.8%
2020	1,303		−0.8%
2025 (est.)	1,283	▼	−1.5%

As of the census of 2000, there were 1,409 people, 650 households, and 388 families residing in the borough. The population density was 5,362.1 inhabitants per square mile (2,070.3/km^{2}). There were 706 housing units at an average density of 2,686.8 per square mile (1,037.4/km^{2}). The racial makeup of the borough was 97.16% White, 1.77% African American, 0.07% Native American, 0.14% from other races, and 0.85% from two or more races. Hispanic or Latino of any race were 1.28% of the population.

There were 650 households, out of which 23.5% had children under the age of 18 living with them, 45.1% were married couples living together, 11.5% had a female householder with no husband present, and 40.3% were non-families. 36.8% of all households were made up of individuals, and 22.6% had someone living alone who was 65 years of age or older. The average household size was 2.17 and the average family size was 2.86.

In the borough the population was spread out, with 19.9% under the age of 18, 6.5% from 18 to 24, 27.9% from 25 to 44, 22.2% from 45 to 64, and 23.6% who were 65 years of age or older. The median age was 42 years. For every 100 females, there were 81.6 males. For every 100 females age 18 and over, there were 75.9 males.

The median income for a household in the borough was $29,135, and the median income for a family was $36,131. Males had a median income of $32,250 versus $22,379 for females. The per capita income for the borough was $17,834. About 5.4% of families and 8.7% of the population were below the poverty line, including 10.3% of those under age 18 and 11.5% of those age 65 or over.

== Notable people ==
- Reggie Walton, United States federal judge
- Jan Todd - when the area was called "Lock 4"

== See also ==
- Charleroi, Pennsylvania — borough on the southern border.
- Monongahela River — Monongahela River on the eastern border.
- Fallowfield Township, Pennsylvania — borough on the western border.
- Carroll Township, Washington County, Pennsylvania — borough on the northern border.
