= Brattleboro Memorial Hospital =

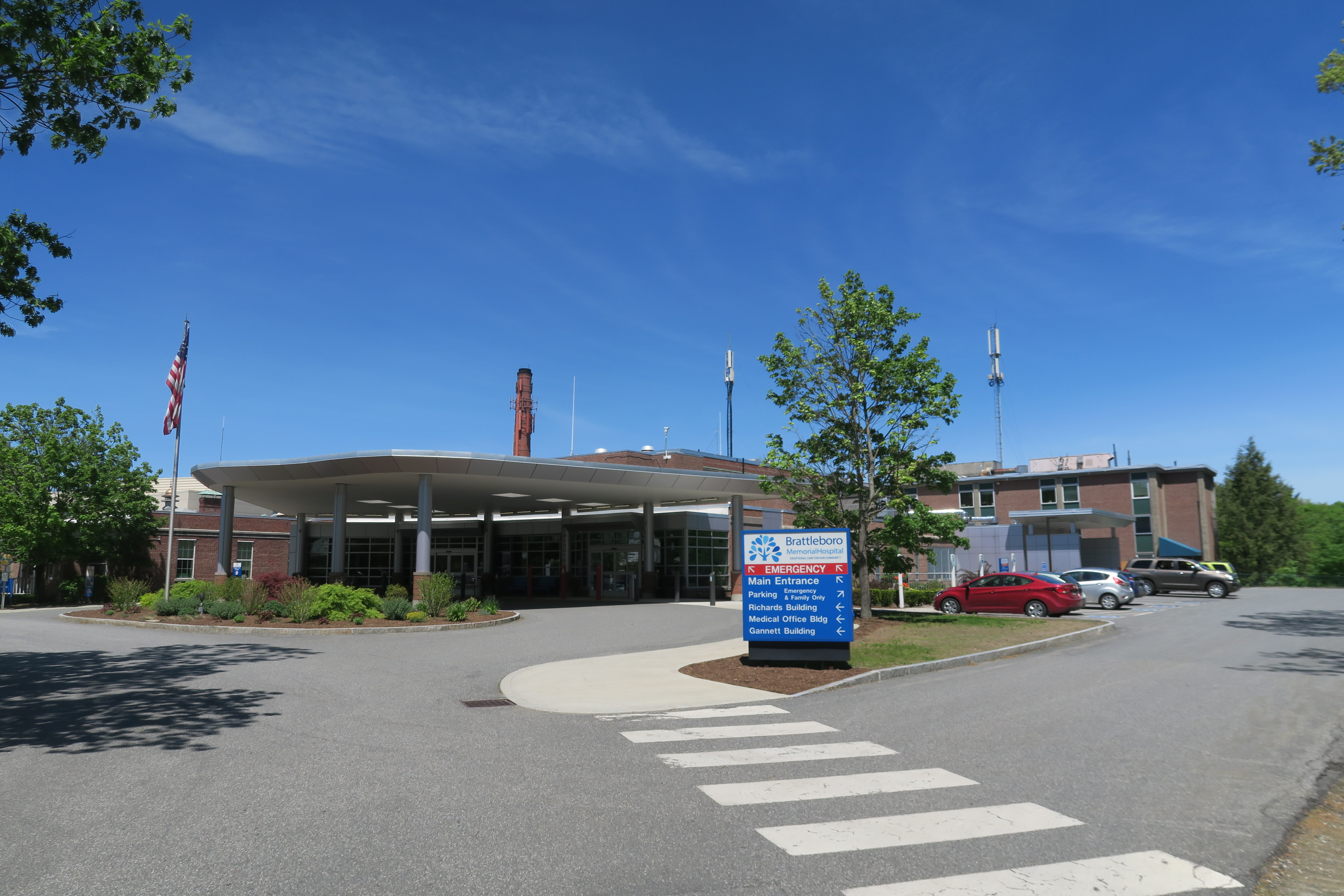
- The main entrance of the hospital

Geography
- Location: Brattleboro, Vermont, United States
- Coordinates: 42°50′36″N 72°33′56″W

Services
- Beds: 61

History
- Founded: 1904

Links
- Website: http://www.bmhvt.org/
- Lists: Hospitals in Vermont

Brattleboro Memorial Hospital is a hospital in Brattleboro, Vermont, United States.

== History ==
Brattleboro Memorial Hospital is a community hospital which has been serving greater Brattleboro and the tri-state area since 1904. The BMH Medical Staff claims to employ more than 130 board-certified physicians, active in both primary care and many specialties.

A $22.7 million dollar expansion of Brattleboro Memorial Hospital in 2022 was named the Ronald Read Pavilion because it was partially funded by a donation by local janitor, Ronald Read.

In October 2026, Brattleboro Memorial Hospital named David Sanville as interim CEO.
