= Geoff Holt (artist) =

English painter

Geoff Holt (1942–1998) was a British artist. Born in Wokingham and raised in South London, Holt was active artistically from 1965–1998, first at Notting Hill and later living and working in Devon until his death.

Holt started his professional career in Bayswater selling to tourists from the railings at Hyde Park. Thus his work spread worldwide; an example is the hand colored print "The Hunter", discovered and restored in New Zealand.

== Biography ==
Holt was born in Wokingham and grew up impoverished in South London.

His talent was spotted at 13 with an entry into Camberwell School of Art. He left at 18. Holt started selling his paintings around the early 1960s on Bayswater Road. Many minor drawings and large oil paintings were produced, resulting in small exhibitions. He then spent some years at the Portobello market with hand crafted chess set reproductions. At the same time the Afro-Caribbean music scene developed and Holt designed some Bob Marley covers produced from his paintings. Denis Holt, Geoff Holt's younger brother, assisted with his work until 1980.

During an independent writing project, which involved identifying a number of important video artists from the mid-1980s, film enthusiast Kevin Hall uncovered no less than nine examples of Geoff's work. It is confirmed that these works were commissioned in late 1986 by video software distributor, "Motion Pictures On Video" for use on this parent label and its offshoots, Quick Video and Screen In Doors. During this period of 'research', Kevin described Geoff's painted works as: "playing a hugely important role in creating a mood that helped define this unique period in the UK's video history," continuing so suggest that "Geoff helped bridge the gap between the classic and the modern with many of his uniquely colourful sleeve designs."

There is little doubt that Geoff had a keen eye for 'stylish' figurative painting; likewise the artist's decidedly brief diversification into designing a number of illustrations which were used as video artworks is seen today as something of a milestone in modern pop culture. Some examples of Geoff's video artworks, in association with the London-based Motion Pictures on Video (MPV), are David Sheldon's surreal and creepy "TANTRUMS" [AKA "Devil Times Five"], Joseph Brooks musical drama "HEADIN' FOR BROADWAY", and Curtis Harrinton's psycho-thriller "THE PSYCHOPATH" [ AKA "The Killing Kind"]."
