= Monessen, Pennsylvania =

City in Pennsylvania, US

- City
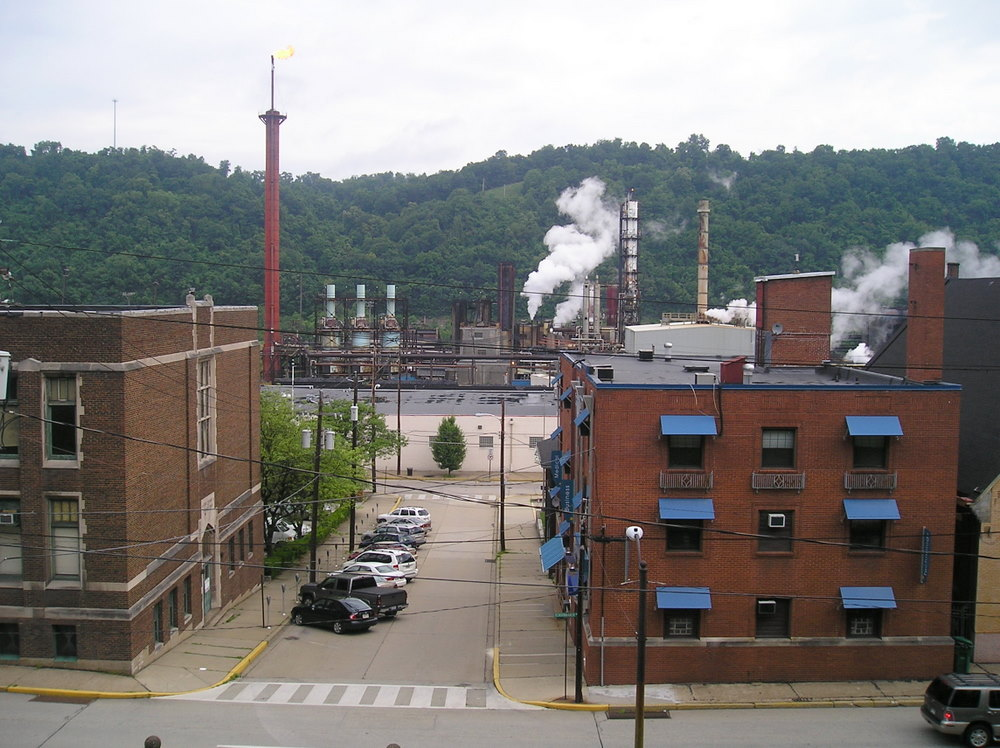
- Downtown Monessen

- Flag Seal

- Location of Monessen in Westmoreland County, Pennsylvania

- Location within Pennsylvania Location within the United States
- Coordinates: 40°9′15″N 79°52′58″W
- Country: United States
- State: Pennsylvania
- County: Westmoreland
- Settled: 1897
- Incorporated: September 3, 1898 (borough); September 16, 1921 (city)
- Named for: Monongahela River and Essen, Germany

Government
  - Mayor: Ron Mozer

Area
  - Total: 3.02 sq mi (7.83 km^{2})
  - Land: 2.89 sq mi (7.48 km^{2})
  - Water: 0.14 sq mi (0.35 km^{2})
- Elevation: 1,128 ft (344 m)

Population (2020)
  - Total: 6,876
  - Density: 2,381.7/sq mi (919.58/km^{2})
- Time zone: UTC-5 (EST)
  - Summer (DST): UTC-4 (EDT)
- ZIP Code: 15062
- Area code: 724
- FIPS code: 42-50344
- School District: Monessen City School District
- Website: www.cityofmonessen.com

Monessen is a city in Westmoreland County, Pennsylvania, United States, along the Monongahela River. The population was 6,876 at the 2020 census. It is part of the Pittsburgh metropolitan area.

Steelmaking was a prominent industry in Monessen, and it became a third-class city in 1921. With restructuring of the steel industry in the late 20th century and loss of jobs, it is considered a Rust Belt borough in the "Mon Valley" of southwestern Pennsylvania. Monessen is included in the Rivers of Steel National Heritage Area, as well as the Laurel Highlands. It sits across the Monongahela from the city of North Charleroi.

== History ==
=== 19th century ===
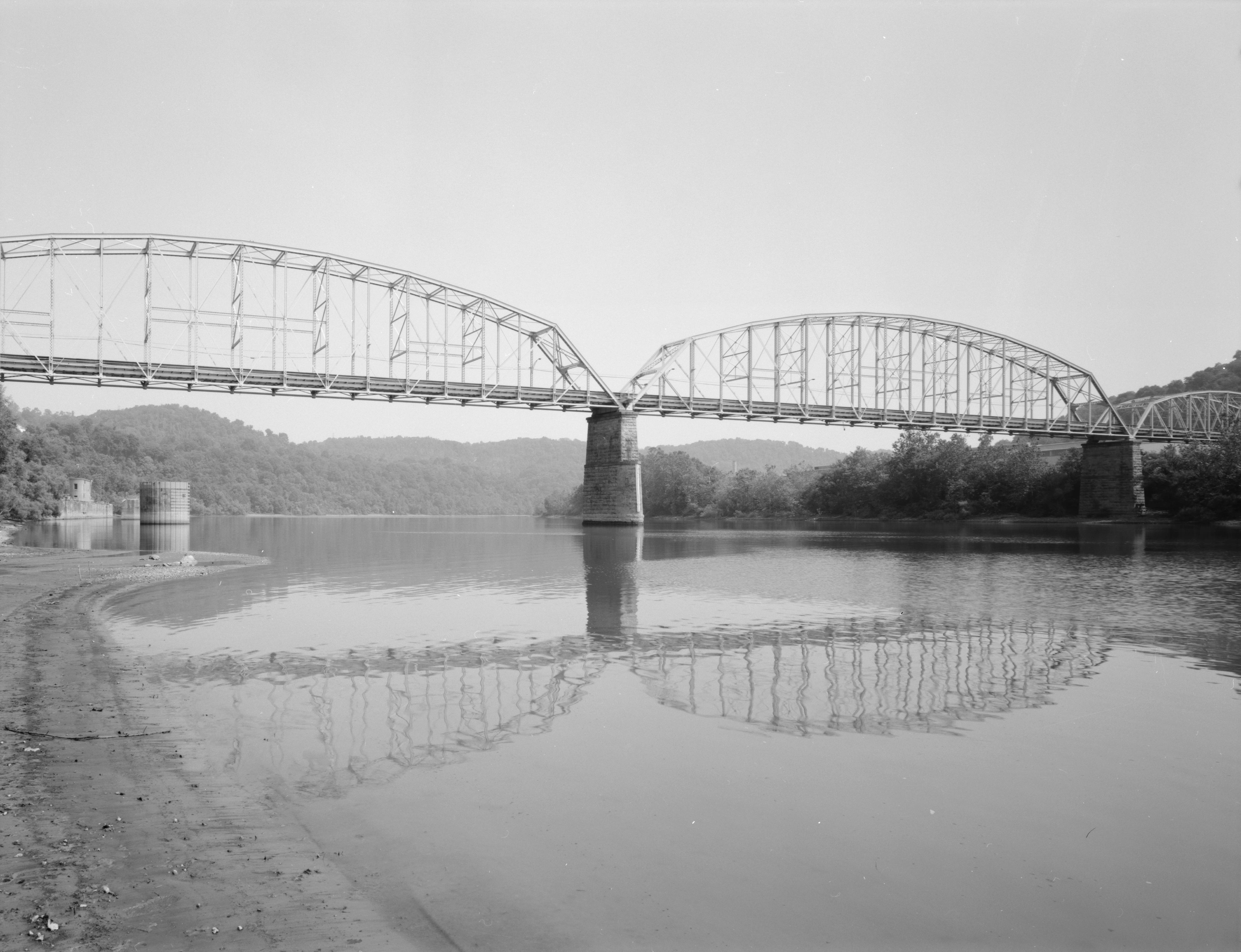
The former Charleroi-Monessen Bridge

Named for the Monongahela River and the industrial German city of Essen, Monessen was created by land speculators fairly late in the history of the Mon Valley, after neighboring towns had already been settled. The East Side Land Company bought land from various farmers, laid out the streets, and then sold the lots to prospective residents and employers. James M. Schoonmaker, who made his fortune in coke, owned a controlling interest in the land company. Other investors in the land company who were also memorialized in street names include Philander C. Knox, James H. Reed, H. Sellers McKee, George O. Morgan, and George B. Motheral. In May 1897, National Tin Plate Company, founded by William Donner, began building its mill, thus becoming Monessen's first employer. Sales of lots began on July 27, 1897, for the general public and other employers. Monessen became a borough on September 3, 1898.

=== 20th century ===
Monessen experienced rapid growth in the first two decades of the 20th century; the population increasing from 2,197 in 1900 to 11,775 in 1910 and then to 18,179 in 1920.

While there were many companies operating in Monessen, the largest employer was Pittsburgh Steel Company, later renamed Wheeling-Pittsburgh Steel. Pay often was determined by ethnic background. For example, a Welsh immigrant would be paid more than an Italian immigrant. A normal workweek was 84 hours with seven-day work weeks of 12 hours a day. Employers did not adopt the eight-hour workday until the 1920s.

Monessen's status changed from borough to city on September 16, 1921.

Beginning in the middle to late 1960s, the region's manufacturers, especially the steel industry, found it harder to compete, which led to employee layoffs. In 1972, the closure of Page Steel and Wire Company was a major setback to the city. A far greater blow to Monessen occurred when its largest employer, Wheeling-Pittsburgh Steel, closed nearly all its Monessen operations in 1986. The company's rail mill did not close until March 1987. The mill's closure marked the end of an era in Monessen's history.

The city has made efforts for several years to clean up abandoned properties in hopes of revitalizing the city. In January 2010 the first female mayor, Mary Jo Smith, was sworn in at the Monessen Municipal Building. Older residents know the steel mills will not be returning to the area. Younger residents barely remember the mills or are even unaware of the city's industrial past. "I remember when they tore the blast furnaces down" in the mid-1990s, said one resident. "It was a big deal. My dad took me. I was 5."

=== 21st century ===
The Charleroi-Monessen Bridge was built in 1906 and demolished in 2011. It was listed on the National Register of Historic Places in 1988 and has yet to be removed from the register. Monessen has many military veterans who fought in WWI, WWII, Korea, Vietnam and the Gulf wars. There are many military war memorials and veterans plaques in the city. Some of the well known ones are the WWI Lady Victory Memorial in the Eastgate section of town, the Honor Roll at the City Park that includes all the names of those from Monessen who served in the military, the WWII Sherman Tank Memorial in the City Park as well as the Capt John Onderko Memorial Walking Track, The Lt Col Edward D'Alfonso Memorial Amphitheater, SP4 Robert Lhota Memorial Picnic Shelter, George Milika Memorial Picnic Shelter and the Anthony Madison Memorial Picnic Shelter. Monessen boasts a War Veterans Memorial Trust to maintain all these memorials in perpetuity. Monessen was home to the following veterans organizations; the Monessen Veterans Council, Disabled American Veterans post 131, Veterans of Foreign Wars Post 1190 and American Legion Post 28.

== Geography ==
Monessen is located at 40°9′15″N 79°52′58″W (40.154271, -79.882779). According to the U.S. Census Bureau, the city has a total area of 3.1 square miles (8.0 km^{2}), of which 2.9 square miles (7.5 km^{2}) is land and 0.2 square miles (0.52 km^{2}) (4.90%) is water.

Monessen is part of the Greater Pittsburgh metropolitan statistical area.

=== Climate ===
The climate in this area is characterized by hot, humid summers and generally mild to cool winters. According to the Köppen Climate Classification system, Monessen has a humid continental climate, abbreviated "Cfa" on climate maps.

Climate data for Monessen, Pennsylvania
Month	Jan	Feb	Mar	Apr	May	Jun	Jul	Aug	Sep	Oct	Nov	Dec	Year
Mean daily maximum °F (°C)	39 (4)	43 (6)	55 (13)	66 (19)	75 (24)	82 (28)	86 (30)	84 (29)	79 (26)	68 (20)	55 (13)	44 (7)	65 (18)
Daily mean °F (°C)	29 (−2)	32 (0)	43 (6)	52 (11)	62 (17)	70 (21)	74 (23)	73 (23)	67 (19)	55 (13)	45 (7)	34 (1)	53 (12)
Mean daily minimum °F (°C)	20 (−7)	22 (−6)	31 (−1)	39 (4)	49 (9)	57 (14)	62 (17)	61 (16)	55 (13)	43 (6)	35 (2)	25 (−4)	41 (5)
Average precipitation inches (mm)	2.9 (74)	2.4 (61)	3.5 (89)	3.4 (86)	3.8 (97)	3.8 (97)	3.7 (94)	3.6 (91)	3 (76)	2.5 (64)	2.9 (74)	2.7 (69)	38 (970)
Average snowfall inches (cm)	7.3 (19)	4.7 (12)	3.7 (9.4)	0.4 (1.0)	0.0 (0.0)	0.0 (0.0)	0.0 (0.0)	0.0 (0.0)	0.0 (0.0)	0.0 (0.0)	1.3 (3.3)	4.1 (10)	21.5 (55)
Source: Weatherbase

=== Surrounding and adjacent neighborhoods ===
Monessen's only land border is with Rostraver Township. Across the Monongahela River in Washington County, Monessen runs adjacent to Carroll and Fallowfield Townships and North Charleroi (with a direct connector via Charleroi-Monessen Bridge).

=== Mine subsidence ===
In 2025, the town was the site of an underground mine subsidence which caused a large sinkhole to form on State Road. Responding to this event, an official of the Pennsylvania Department of Environmental Protection was quoted as saying “there’s not a house in town” that doesn’t have a mine under it.

== Demographics ==
Historical population
Census	Pop.	Note	%±
1900	2,197		—
1910	11,775		436.0%
1920	18,179		54.4%
1930	20,268		11.5%
1940	20,257		−0.1%
1950	17,896		−11.7%
1960	18,424		3.0%
1970	15,216		−17.4%
1980	11,928		−21.6%
1990	9,901		−17.0%
2000	8,669		−12.4%
2010	7,720		−10.9%
2020	6,876		−10.9%

=== 2020 census ===
As of the 2020 census, Monessen had a population of 6,876. The median age was 48.1 years. 17.8% of residents were under the age of 18 and 24.1% of residents were 65 years of age or older. For every 100 females there were 87.5 males, and for every 100 females age 18 and over there were 86.1 males age 18 and over.

100.0% of residents lived in urban areas, while 0.0% lived in rural areas.

There were 3,175 households in Monessen, of which 20.5% had children under the age of 18 living in them. Of all households, 33.3% were married-couple households, 21.9% were households with a male householder and no spouse or partner present, and 37.4% were households with a female householder and no spouse or partner present. About 38.4% of all households were made up of individuals and 17.6% had someone living alone who was 65 years of age or older.

There were 3,919 housing units, of which 19.0% were vacant. The homeowner vacancy rate was 2.1% and the rental vacancy rate was 17.7%.

Racial composition as of the 2020 census
Race	Number	Percent
White	5,113	74.4%
Black or African American	1,136	16.5%
American Indian and Alaska Native	15	0.2%
Asian	20	0.3%
Native Hawaiian and Other Pacific Islander	2	0.0%
Some other race	66	1.0%
Two or more races	524	7.6%
Hispanic or Latino (of any race)	167	2.4%

=== 2010 census ===
As of the 2010 census, there were 8,669 people, 3,916 households, and 2,451 families residing in the city. The population density was 2,986.8 inhabitants per square mile (1,153.2/km^{2}). There were 4,468 housing units at an average density of 1,539.4 per square mile (594.4/km^{2}). The racial makeup of the city was 83.71% White, 13.99% African American, 0.09% Native American, 0.23% Asian, 0.01% Pacific Islander, 0.33% from other races, and 1.63% from two or more races. Hispanic or Latino people of any race were 0.82% of the population.

There were 3,916 households, out of which 21.2% had children under the age of 18 living with them, 42.9% were married couples living together, 15.2% had a female householder with no husband present, and 37.4% were non-families. 34.3% of all households were made up of individuals, and 22.2% had someone living alone who was 65 years of age or older. The average household size was 2.19 and the average family size was 2.80.

In the city, the population was spread out, with 19.6% under the age of 18, 5.3% from 18 to 24, 23.3% from 25 to 44, 22.7% from 45 to 64, and 29.1% who were 65 years of age or older. The median age was 46 years. For every 100 females, there were 84.8 males. For every 100 females age 18 and over, there were 79.0 males.

The median income for a household in the city was $26,686, and the median income for a family was $37,269. Males had a median income of $34,773 versus $21,508 for females. The per capita income for the city was $16,627. About 11.5% of families and 15.7% of the population were below the poverty line, including 27.7% of those under age 18 and 8.2% of those age 65 or over.

=== 2000 census ===
27.9% were of Italian, 8.4% Slovak, 7.5% German and 7.0% Polish ancestry according to Census 2000.

== Education ==
- Douglas Education Center is a private, for profit higher education career school, located in Monessen.
- Monessen City School District is a public school district in Westmoreland County, Pennsylvania.

== Notable people ==
- Christian B. Anfinsen (1916-1995), biochemist; recipient of Nobel Prize in Chemistry in 1972 for his pioneering study into the structure of ribonuclease; author of Anfinsen's Dogma
- Steve Belichick (1919-2005), NFL player and college coach, including 33-year tenure as assistant and scout at Navy
- Tony Benjamin (1955-), football player
- Eric Crabtree (1944-), NFL Football Player for the Denver Broncos, Cincinnati Bengals, and New England Patriots
- Doug Crusan (1946-), NFL Football Player for the Miami Dolphins
- Artis Leon Ivey Jr. (1963-2022), Grammy Award winning rapper, actor, producer known as Coolio.
- Nicholas P. Kafkalas (1920–2013), US Army major general
- Philander C. Knox (1852-1921), United States Senator, Brownsville, Pennsylvania native, one of several founders of the City of Monessen
- Albert Lexie, shoeshiner known for donating one third of his lifetime salary to charity
- Bill Malinchak (1944-), former football wide receiver and special teams ace in the National Football League in the 1960s and 1970s
- Frances McDormand, Oscar-winning American actress
- Herman Mihalich (1930-1997), former Democratic member of the Pennsylvania House of Representatives
- Michael Moorer, former heavyweight boxer; boxing champion
- Armand Niccolai (1911-1988), former NFL player for the Pittsburgh Pirates/Steelers
- Lawrence T. Persico, Bishop of the Roman Catholic Diocese of Erie
- James H. Reed (1853-1927), Allegheny, Pennsylvania native, United States federal judge, lawyer, founder of Reed Smith law firm, one of several founders of the City of Monessen
- Tom Savini, makeup artist
- James M. Schoonmaker (1842-1927) Pittsburgh native, American Civil War Colonel, vice-president of the Pittsburgh and Lake Erie Railroad, one of several founders of the City of Monessen
- Blanche Thebom, mezzo-soprano singer
- Shelly Zegart (1941–2025), quilt collector, historian, and advocate
- Floyd "Chip" Ganassi Jr. (born May 24, 1958) is an American businessman, former racing driver, current team owner and member of the Motorsports Hall of Fame of America.
