= Geoffrey Holt (philanthropist) =

American eccentric (1941–2023)

- Geoffrey Holt aboard his riding mower in 2020
- Born: March 27, 1941; Indianapolis, Indiana, US
- Died: June 6, 2023 (aged 82); Keene, New Hampshire, US
- Education: Marlboro College (BA); American International College (MA)
- Occupations: Production manager; groundskeeper; philanthropist
- Known for: Bequeathing US$3.8 million to Hinsdale, New Hampshire

Geoffrey Holt (March 27, 1941 – June 6, 2023) was an American groundskeeper, miller, factory worker, and town eccentric. On his death, he left US$3.8 million to his town of Hinsdale, New Hampshire.

Holt's wealth was unknown to his neighbors. His fortune came from investing a payout from a grain mill, where he was a production manager. Later in life he worked as a groundskeeper in a mobile home park where he resided, choosing to navigate town aboard a lawn mower rather than using a car.

== Early life ==
Born on March 27, 1941, in Indianapolis to Lee and Margaret Holt (nee Goddard), Geoffrey Holt grew up in Springfield, Massachusetts. According to his sister, Holt faced challenges due to dyslexia during his strict upbringing. Their father was "weird about money", said Holt's sister, and did not approve of small expenses, like the bouquet she once got for her mom.

After graduating from the George School, a Quaker rural boarding school in Pennsylvania, in 1959 and earning a bachelor's degree from Marlboro College in Vermont in 1963, Holt served in the United States Navy. In 1968 he received a Master of Arts degree from American International College in Springfield, Massachusetts, where his father worked as an English literature professor.

== Career and investments ==
Holt taught social studies and drivers' education at Thayer High School in Winchester, New Hampshire, before joining the Agway grain mill, where he eventually became a production manager.

While living in Hinsdale and working at the Agway mill in nearby Brattleboro, Vermont, he led a frugal lifestyle, commuting to work on a bicycle after selling his car. He undertook extensive trips "with a 12-pack of beer strapped to the bike", covering roundtrip distances up to 140 miles (230 km) along the Connecticut River to White River Junction, Vermont. He also biked to Amherst, Massachusetts, where his parents lived. In the 1980s, the Agway mill closed and Holt received a cash settlement which he invested in stocks and mutual funds.

Post-mill closure, Holt engaged in various odd jobs around town and later worked as a groundskeeper at a mobile home park where he lived. He shared his residence in the park with his longtime partner, Thelma Parker, who died in 2017. He was a dedicated hobbyist who collected well over 1,000 die-cast model cars, dozens of model railroad layouts, and many records and history books, with a particular focus on Henry Ford and World War II. Otherwise, his house was largely empty and did not have a television or internet. Locals knew him as quiet and unassuming, wearing old clothes and riding a lawn mower for errands instead of a car.

Holt's financial success remained largely unknown to others because he continued to live frugally, relying on social security checks for sustenance in his final 15 years.

== Later life and death ==
Around 2000, Holt confided to his best friend, former employer and a former Republican N.H. state lawmaker Edwin "Smokey" Smith that his investments were doing better than he had ever expected and he was not sure what to do with the money. Smith, unaware of the amount of wealth Holt had amassed, joked with Holt about leaving his fortune to the town. In 2001, Holt approached the New Hampshire Charitable Foundation and reached an agreement for the nonprofit to distribute the funds after his death.

In September 2021, Holt suffered a stroke, necessitating a move to an assisted living facility and eventually full-time nursing care. He died on June 6, 2023, naming Smith executor of his estate and bequeathing US$3.8 million to his town of Hinsdale to be used for health, education, culture or recreation. The town and community organizations can access approximately $150,000 annually from the endowment's interest by applying for grants through the foundation.

== Legacy ==
A NewsNation reporter called the story of Holt's gift, broken nationally around Thanksgiving, "one of the best holiday stories."

Holt's gift inspired discussions about other low-profile individuals who left fortunes to their communities and how these communities are using the unexpected windfall. For example, Francis "Rudy" Gelnett left the bulk of his estate—US$5.8 million—to his borough of Selinsgrove, Pennsylvania, (population c. 5,000) when he died in 2010. As of 2023, the Rudy Gelnett trust (valued at c. US$5.5 million) supported the Gelnett Memorial Library, Dauntless Hook & Ladder Fire Co., and the public swimming pool. Another secret millionaire, Ronald Read, a janitor and gas station attendant, left US$6 million of his $8 million fortune to his town's hospital and library in Brattleboro, Vermont, (7 miles (11 km) away from Hinsdale) when he died at 92 in 2014. Like Holt, he quietly built his wealth through savvy investing and living modestly, a fact unbeknownst to even his closest friends.

As of the end of November 2023, Hinsdale residents had been sharing ideas online about how to spend Holt's money, with the most popular suggestion being to reduce the tax base.

== See also ==
- Sylvia Bloom
