= Dale Schroeder =

American carpenter and philanthropist

- Born: Dale Dustin Schroeder; April 8, 1919; Clarion, Iowa, U.S.
- Died: April 12, 2005 (aged 86); Des Moines, Iowa, U.S.
- Occupations: Carpenter, philanthropist

Dale Dustin Schroeder (April 8, 1919 – April 12, 2005) was an American carpenter and philanthropist.

Schroeder was born in Clarion, Iowa. He spent 67 years working for the same company and lived an extremely frugal life, owning only two pairs of blue jeans: one for work and one for attending church on Sundays. He had amassed $3 million in life savings by the time of his death at the age of 86. He arranged for that money to be used for the college education of 33 students from Iowa because he had grown up poor and wanted to help people like himself to attend college. His generosity allowed 33 beneficiaries to attend universities such as Iowa State University, the University of Iowa and the University of Northern Iowa, many of whom became physicians and teachers, and to graduate from college without debt. The final beneficiary received the remaining $80,000 and graduated as a therapist in 2019. The 33 beneficiaries have since formed a group they refer to as "Dale's Kids".

Schroeder died on April 12, 2005 at the Iowa Lutheran Hospital in Des Moines, Iowa, at the age of 86.
