= Chuck Feeney =

American businessman (1931–2023)

- Born: Charles Francis Feeney; April 23, 1931; Elizabeth, New Jersey, U.S.
- Died: October 9, 2023 (aged 92); San Francisco, California, U.S.
- Citizenship: United States
- Education: Cornell University
- Occupations: Founder of Duty Free Shoppers Group; Founder of Atlantic Philanthropies
- Spouses: Danielle J. Feeney (m. 1959; div. 1991) Helga Feeney (m. 1995)
- Children: 5

Charles Francis Feeney (April 23, 1931 – October 9, 2023) was an American businessman and philanthropist who made his fortune as a co-founder of Duty Free Shoppers Group, the travel retailer of luxury products based in Hong Kong. He was the founder of the Atlantic Philanthropies, one of the largest private charitable foundations in the world. Feeney gave away his fortune in secret for many years, choosing to be anonymous, and donating more than $8 billion in his lifetime.

== Early life and education ==
Feeney was born in Elizabeth, New Jersey, on April 23, 1931, during the Great Depression, to Irish-American parents. His mother was a hospital nurse, and his father was an insurance underwriter. His ancestry can be traced to County Fermanagh in Northern Ireland and County Longford in the Republic of Ireland. His paternal great-grandparents, Patrick Feeney Jr. and Mary Harvey, were from Cullentragh in the civil parish and barony of Rathcline, County Longford.

As a youth, Feeney worked selling Christmas cards door-to-door, as a golf caddy, and shoveling snow from driveways. He graduated from Elizabeth's St. Mary of the Assumption High School in 1949 and later credited his charitable spirit to his education there. His 2016 donation of $250,000 was the largest in the school's history from a single contributor. He served as a U.S. Air Force radio operator during the Korean War and began his career selling duty-free liquor to U.S. naval personnel at Mediterranean ports in the 1950s.

Feeney graduated from the Cornell University School of Hotel Administration in 1956. He was a member of Alpha Sigma Phi and an honorary member of the Sphinx Head Society.

== Career ==
The concept of "duty-free shopping"—offering high-end concessions to travelers free of import taxes—was in its infancy when Feeney and his college classmate Robert Warren Miller started selling duty-free liquor to American servicemen in Asia in the 1950s. They later expanded to selling cars and tobacco and founded the Duty Free Shoppers Group (DFS Group) in 1960. DFS began operations in Hong Kong, later expanding to Europe and other continents. A breakthrough came in the early 1960s when DFS secured a concession for duty-free sales in Hawaii, allowing the company to market its products to Japanese travelers.

DFS eventually expanded to off-airport duty-free stores and large downtown Galleria stores, becoming the world's largest travel retailer. By the mid-1990s, DFS was distributing profits of up to $300 million a year to Feeney, Miller, and two smaller partners. Laura Bird wrote in The Wall Street Journal: "The rich returns came about in large part because DFS, like most other retailers in Asia, took a far higher markup on Western luxury items than was the case in Europe and the U.S. In New York, a retailer might price a designer handbag at 2.2 or 2.3 times the wholesale price. But in Asia, the retail price was a standard three times wholesale."

In 1996, Feeney and a partner sold their stakes in DFS to the French luxury conglomerate Louis Vuitton Moët Hennessy. Miller opposed the sale, and, before a presumptive lawsuit could reveal that Feeney's stake was owned not in fact by him but by the Atlantic Philanthropies, Feeney outed himself in a New York Times article. Atlantic made $1.63 billion from the sale.

== Philanthropy ==
I had one idea that never changed in my mind—that you should use your wealth to help people.

— Chuck Feeney

In 1982, Feeney created Atlantic Philanthropies and, in 1984, secretly transferred his entire 38.75% stake in DFS, then worth about $500 million, to the foundation. Not even his business partners knew that he no longer owned any part of DFS. Feeney expanded Atlantic's assets with investments in Facebook, Priceline, E-Trade, Alibaba, and Legent. For years, Atlantic gave away money in secret, requiring recipients to not reveal the source of their donations. Quoting the president of Atlantic, The New York Times wrote: "Beyond Mr. Feeney's reticence about blowing his own horn, 'it was also a way to leverage more donations—some other individual might contribute to get the naming rights.'"

The largest single beneficiary of Feeney's giving was his alma mater Cornell University, which received nearly $1 billion in direct and Atlantic gifts, including a donation of $350 million enabling the creation of Cornell's New York City Tech Campus on Roosevelt Island. Through Atlantic, he also donated around one billion dollars to education in Ireland, mostly to third-level institutions such as the University of Limerick and Dublin City University.

In Northern Ireland he supported "mixed" (i.e., Catholic and Protestant) child education. In 1991, he gave £8m to the Integrated Education Fund, a grant-making charitable body which aims "to make integration, not separation, the norm in our education system". Queens University Belfast also received grants of more than £100m, for capital projects, child education and medical research.

Feeney gave substantial personal donations to Sinn Féin, a left-wing Irish nationalist party that has been historically associated with the IRA. Following the IRA ceasefire in 1994, he funded the party's office in Washington D.C.

Feeney supported the modernization of public-health structures in Vietnam, AIDS clinics in South Africa, Operation Smile's free surgeries for children with cleft lips and palates, earthquake relief in Haiti, and the UCSF Medical Center at the University of California at San Francisco.

Jim Dwyer wrote in The New York Times that none of the one thousand buildings on five continents that were built with Feeney's gifts of $2.7 billion bear his name.

In February 2011, Feeney became a signatory to The Giving Pledge. In his letter to Bill Gates and Warren Buffett, the founders of The Giving Pledge, Feeney wrote, "I cannot think of a more personally rewarding and appropriate use of wealth than to give while one is living—to personally devote oneself to meaningful efforts to improve the human condition. More importantly, today's needs are so great and varied that intelligent philanthropic support and positive interventions can have greater value and impact today than if they are delayed when the needs are greater." He gave away a final $7 million in late 2016, to the same recipient of his first charitable donations, Cornell University. Over the course of his life, he gave away more than $8 billion. At its height, Atlantic had over 300 employees and 10 offices across the globe.

Over the years, Atlantic warned about phishing emails claiming to come from the foundation or from Chuck Feeney himself, saying that they want to distribute money to "randomly selected individuals" worldwide and asking the recipient for personal details.

On September 14, 2020, Feeney closed down the Atlantic Philanthropies after the non-profit accomplished its mission of giving away all of its money by 2020.

== Accolades ==
Forbes magazine called Feeney the "James Bond of Philanthropy" due to the stealthy and successful manner in which he anonymously donated approximately $8 billion to various charities. In 1997, Time said that "Feeney's beneficence already ranks among the grandest of any living American." He shunned publicity, although he cooperated in his 2007 biography, The Billionaire Who Wasn't: How Chuck Feeney Made and Gave Away a Fortune Without Anyone Knowing. Feeney was also the subject of a documentary by RTÉ Factual, titled Secret Billionaire: The Chuck Feeney Story.

In 2010, he received the Cornell Icon of Industry Award. In 2012, all the universities of Ireland, North and South, jointly conferred an Honorary Doctorate of Laws on Feeney. During the same year, he also received Ireland's Presidential Distinguished Service Award for Irish Abroad.

On June 6, 2019, which was the 160th anniversary of the establishment of the Australian state of Queensland, Feeney was made an Honorary Queensland Great for his contribution to the state.

In 2012, he was awarded the UCSF Medal for outstanding personal contributions to the health science mission of the University of California, San Francisco. In 2015, he received the UC Presidential Medal from President Napolitano. To honor Feeney's contributions to the school, the UCSF Mission Bay campus announced in December 2023 the renaming of Campus Way, its major thoroughfare on campus, to The Feeney Way. This will include street signs, pavement markers, pole banners and a monument.

In 2014, Warren Buffett said of Feeney, "[He is] my hero and Bill Gates' hero. He should be everybody's hero."

In December 2020, Cornell University announced that it would rename East Avenue (a road that runs through the center of campus and sits alongside his alma mater, the Cornell University School of Hotel Administration) "Feeney Way" to honor his contributions to the university. In April 2023, the university announced that Cornell Tech campus central thoroughfare "Tech Walk", on Roosevelt Island in New York City, would become its second "Feeney Way".

Fordham University presented Feeney with an honorary doctorate of humane letters in March 2022. He was appointed an Honorary Companion of the Order of Australia in August for his service to Australian health, education and research through the Atlantic Philanthropies. RMIT University presented him with an honorary doctorate of law in December 2022.

== Personal life ==
Feeney was known for his frugality; according to a New York Times article in 2017, "Until he was 75, he traveled only in coach, and carried reading materials in a plastic bag." He did not own a car or a house and wore a $10 Casio F-91W watch.

As of 2016, he lived in a rented apartment in San Francisco, with remaining assets of $2 million.

=== Marriages ===
Feeney's first wife, Danielle, was French Algerian. When they first met, she was a student at the Sorbonne. They were married in Paris in October 1959, first in a civil ceremony at the town hall, and the next day in church. They had four daughters: Caroleen A. Feeney, Diane V. Feeney, Juliette M. Feeney-Timsit, Leslie D. Feeney-Baily; and one son, Patrick A. Feeney. He and Danielle divorced between 1990 and 1991.

Feeney's second wife, Helga, whom he married in 1995, was his former secretary.

=== Death ===
Feeney died in San Francisco on October 9, 2023, aged 92.
